= Schützenpanzer Lang HS.30 =

Schutzenpanzer Lang HS.30
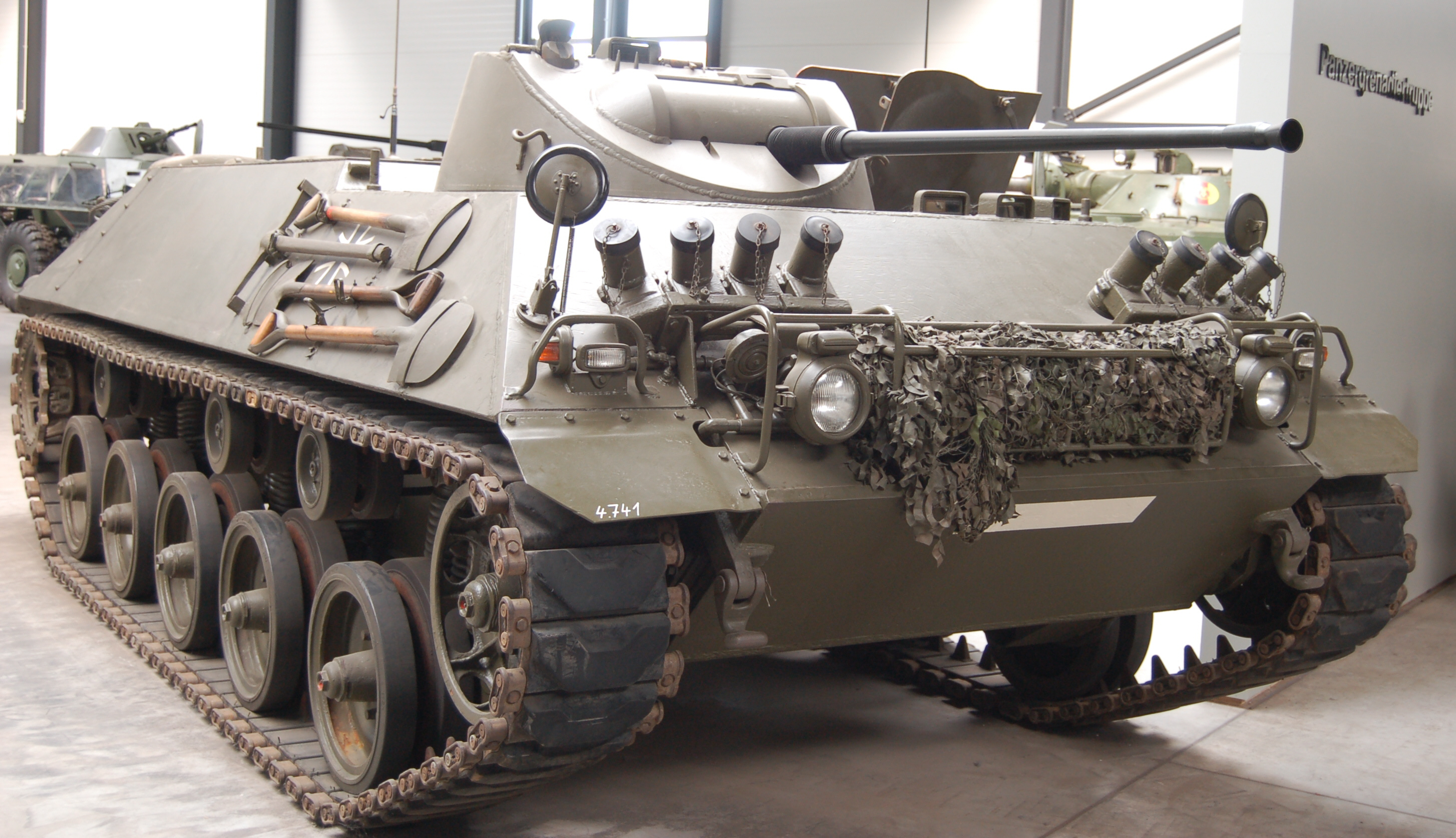
- HS.30 as presented in the German Tank Museum in 2008
- Type: Infantry fighting vehicle

Service history
- In service: 1960–1980s

Production history
- Designer: Hispano-Suiza
- Designed: 1956–1958
- Manufacturer: Hispano-Suiza; Hanomag; Henschel; Leyland
- Unit cost: DM 238,000
- Produced: 1958–1962
- No. built: 2,176

Specifications
- Mass: 14.6 tonnes
- Length: 5.56 m (18 ft 3 in)
- Width: 2.54 m (8 ft 4 in)
- Height: 1.85 m (6 ft 1 in)
- Crew: 3
- Passengers: 5
- Armor: 30 mm at 45°
- Main armament: 20 mm HS 820 autocannon 2,000 rounds
- Secondary armament: 7.62 mm MG3 machine gun 2x4 Smoke grenade launchers
- Engine: Rolls-Royce B81 Mk 80F 8-cylinder petrol 220 hp (164 kW)
- Power/weight: 15.3 hp/tonne
- Suspension: Torsion bar, three bogie, five road wheels
- Operational range: 270 km (170 mi)
- Maximum speed: 58 km/h (36 mph)

The Schützenpanzer Lang HS.30, officially designated as Schützenpanzer, lang, Typ 12-3 or abbreviated as SPz lg 12-3, (German for "Infantry tank, long, Type 12-3"), (Note: The HS.30 was named Schützenpanzer lang ("Infantry tank long") to distinguish it from the Schützenpanzer SPz 11-2 Kurz by Hotchkiss, which entered service with the German armed forces around the same time. The Hotchkiss design was much shorter than the HS.30 and was given the designation Schützenpanzer kurz ("infantry tank short").) was a West German infantry fighting vehicle developed between 1956 and 1958. It was designed by the Swiss company Hispano-Suiza and powered by a Rolls-Royce engine. Due to initial mechanical issues, only 2,176 units were produced out of the 10,680 originally planned. The vehicle was equipped with a 20 mm autocannon.

The HS.30's design was plagued by numerous flaws and drawbacks, which eventually led to a significant political scandal in West Germany during the 1960s. Of the 2,176 SPz HS.30 and its variants built by 1962, the German government paid 517 million DM, translating to approximately 238,000 DM per vehicle. The HS.30 first entered service with the Panzergrenadier battalions in 1960, but was gradually replaced by the more advanced Marder infantry fighting vehicle starting in 1971.

== Design and doctrine ==
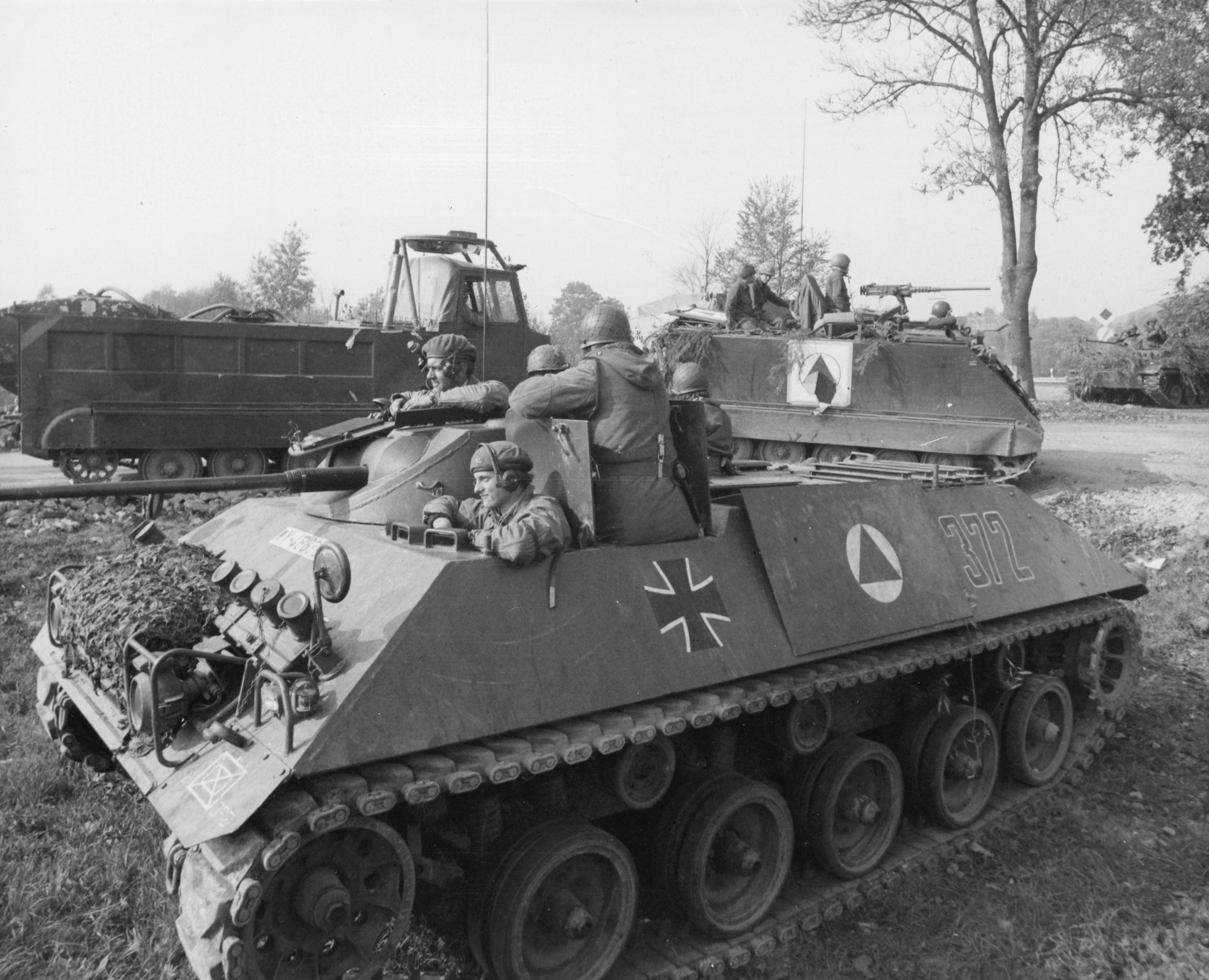
West German Panzergrenadiers aboard the HS.30 during NATO exercise REFORGER III, 1971.

Rejecting the American doctrine that an armored personnel carrier (APC) should serve as a "battlefield taxi" and not as an assault vehicle, the Germans developed the HS.30 to fight alongside tanks and enable their mechanized infantry to engage the enemy from within the vehicle. This approach was influenced by Germany's World War II experience with Panzergrenadiere (armored infantry). German doctrine considered the SPz 12-3 as an integral part of the squad's equipment, with the squad trained to fight with the vehicle in both offensive and defensive operations. Unlike the American M113, the HS.30 could not float, but since German doctrine envisioned the HS.30 operating in conjunction with main battle tanks that also lacked amphibious capabilities, this was not seen as a significant disadvantage.

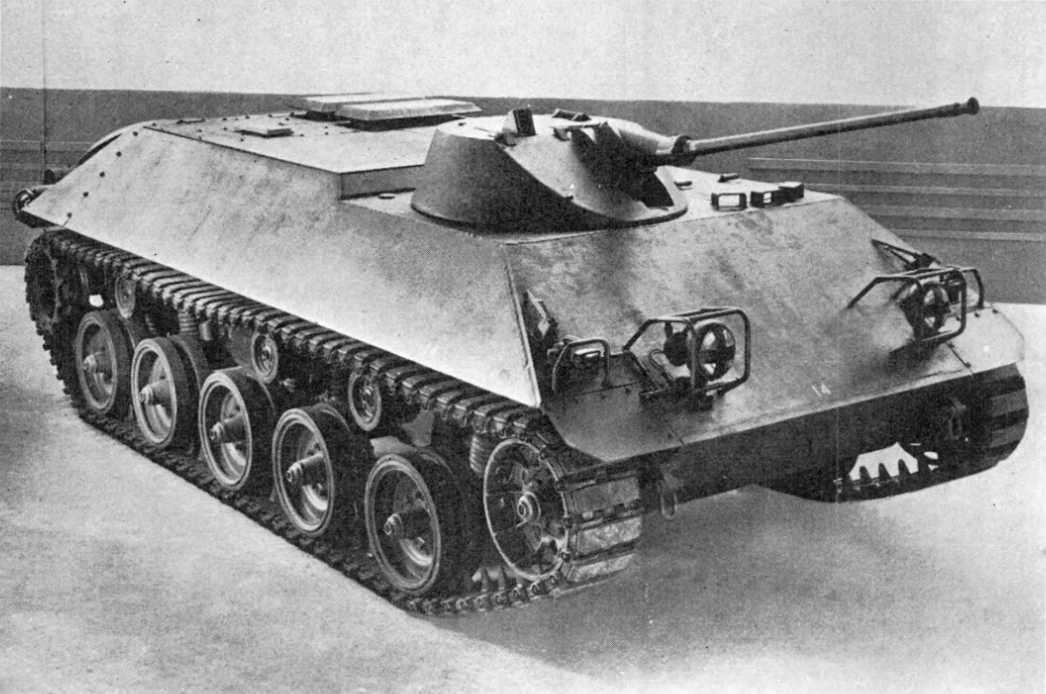
HS.30 in a 1963 illustration

The HS.30 was equipped with a small turret housing a Hispano-Suiza HS.820 20-mm autocannon and a 15×15 periscopic sight, similar to the turret on the Schützenpanzer Kurz. According to German doctrine, the role of the 20-mm autocannon was to engage helicopters, anti-tank weapons, and light armored vehicles, thereby allowing tanks to focus their firepower on other tanks. Despite having a turret, the HS.30 was still two feet (0.6 m) lower in height than the M113, making it a smaller target. The vehicle carried an onboard supply of 2,000 rounds of 20 mm ammunition. The frontal armor provided protection against 20-mm projectiles, which was superior to that of comparable vehicles from other nations. However, this additional armor made the HS.30 four tons heavier than the M113, even though it could only carry half as many troops. To allow squad members to fire their personal weapons while mounted, roof hatches had to be opened, exposing the soldiers. The Germans considered this a significant disadvantage, especially given the expectation that the Soviet Army would use chemical agents in any conflict between NATO and the Warsaw Pact.

Despite the German army's emphasis on developing a true infantry fighting vehicle rather than just an APC, the Panzergrenadier brigades included an infantry battalion initially transported by trucks and later by M113 APCs. This composition likely reflected cost considerations as well as doctrine, which called for one-third of the Panzergrenadiere to be a motorized force.

== The HS.30 and its contemporaries ==
Comparison of the SPz HS.30 and similar vehicles
Vehicle	Main weapon	Frontal armor	Height	Infantry carried	Introduction year
SPz 12-3 Lang (Germany)	20 mm HS-820	30 mm at 45°	1.85 m	5	1960
SPz 11-2 Kurz (Germany)	20 mm HS-820	15 mm at 62°	1.97 m	3	1959
AMX-VCI (France)	12.7 mm M2 Browning machine gun (later 20mm autocannon)	15 mm at 45°	2.1 m	10	1957
M113 (USA)	12.7 mm M2 HMG	38 mm aluminium at 45°	2.5 m	11	1960
BTR-50P (USSR)	7.62 mm SGMB machine gun (some with 14.5 mm heavy machine gun)	11 mm steel at 60°	1.97 m	20	1954
FV432 (UK)	7.62 mm FN MAG	12.7 mm steel	2.28 m	10	1962
Pansarbandvagn 301 (Sweden)	20 mm akan m/45B (Bofors 20 mm automatic gun L/70)	8 – 50 mm steel	2.64 m to top of gunmount	8	1961
Saurer 4K 4FA-G2 (Austria)	12.7 mm M2 HMG (or); 20 mm Oerlikon Model 204	12 – 20 mm steel	2.1 m	6	1961

== Politics, service and reliability issues ==
=== Political decision making ===
The acquisition of equipment for the newly formed Bundeswehr in its early years was driven by military, economic, and political factors. Military requirements pointed towards a vehicle similar to the French AMX-13 VTP, but its unit cost was too high. The US M59 armored personnel carrier was considered too heavy and too tall for the envisioned doctrine. Additionally, the lack of interest from West German industries in building weapons posed a challenge—Germany was still forbidden to export arms due to post-World War II restrictions. This meant that investment in developing an armored fighting vehicle (AFV) would not generate future revenue from exports. Politically, it seemed reasonable to turn to West Germany's allies to order AFVs and support their struggling economies. Consequently, the Schützenpanzer SPz 11-2 Kurz (developed from the Hotchkiss SP1A) was ordered from France. After a deal to acquire the Centurion from the United Kingdom became obsolete when the US provided M41 Walker Bulldog and M47 Patton tanks as military aid, forming a consortium to build the new AFV partially in Britain, as offered by Hispano-Suiza in 1955, seemed appealing.

The Hispano-Suiza offer met all the requirements laid out by the German Federal Ministry of Defence. With an estimated cost of only 170,000 DM per unit, it was 30% cheaper than the AMX VTP. The urgency created by the commitment to NATO to form and equip 12 West German divisions by 1960 led the Ministry of Defence to opt for the Hispano-Suiza model, placing orders for 10,680 AFVs. Dieter H. Kollmar, in his analysis of the acquisition process, suggests that Hispano-Suiza may have learned about the requirements in advance and tailored their offer accordingly. Hispano-Suiza itself did not have the facilities to build an AFV. Instead, it acquired patents for a 20-mm autocannon and used its network of business contacts across Europe to finalize the AFV plans. Lobbyists, often former Wehrmacht officers, aggressively promoted Hispano-Suiza's offer to decision-makers in the Ministry of Defence, many of whom shared the same background.

When the Ministry of Defence, under its new secretary Franz Josef Strauss, learned from the 1958 evaluation on the proving grounds about multiple shortcomings of the HS.30, it grew increasingly impatient with Hispano-Suiza and cut the initial order of 10,680 units down to 2,800, with 1,089 to be built by Leyland Motors in the United Kingdom, and the remainder by Henschel and Hanomag in Germany. A settlement with Hispano-Suiza was reached in 1960, with the German government paying 40 million DM to compensate for investments and lost revenue.

Later, a series of disclosures by the press, several hearings, and an investigation unfolded around the acquisition of the HS.30. Witnesses, such as the former German ambassador to Switzerland, Friedrich Holzapfel, were heard, and stories emerged about potential payments made to individuals and political parties, based on claims by then-lobbyist and former Weimar Republic cabinet minister Gottfried Treviranus and businessman Werner Plappert. According to Dieter H. Kollmar, the progress of the official investigation was hindered by witnesses seeking recognition and by charlatans. Accusations made in this context against Franz Josef Strauss were later proven false. Kollmar attributed the problems with the HS.30 to the fraudulent practices of Hispano-Suiza and insufficient oversight in the Federal Ministry of Defence’s procurement processes.

=== Reliability problems ===
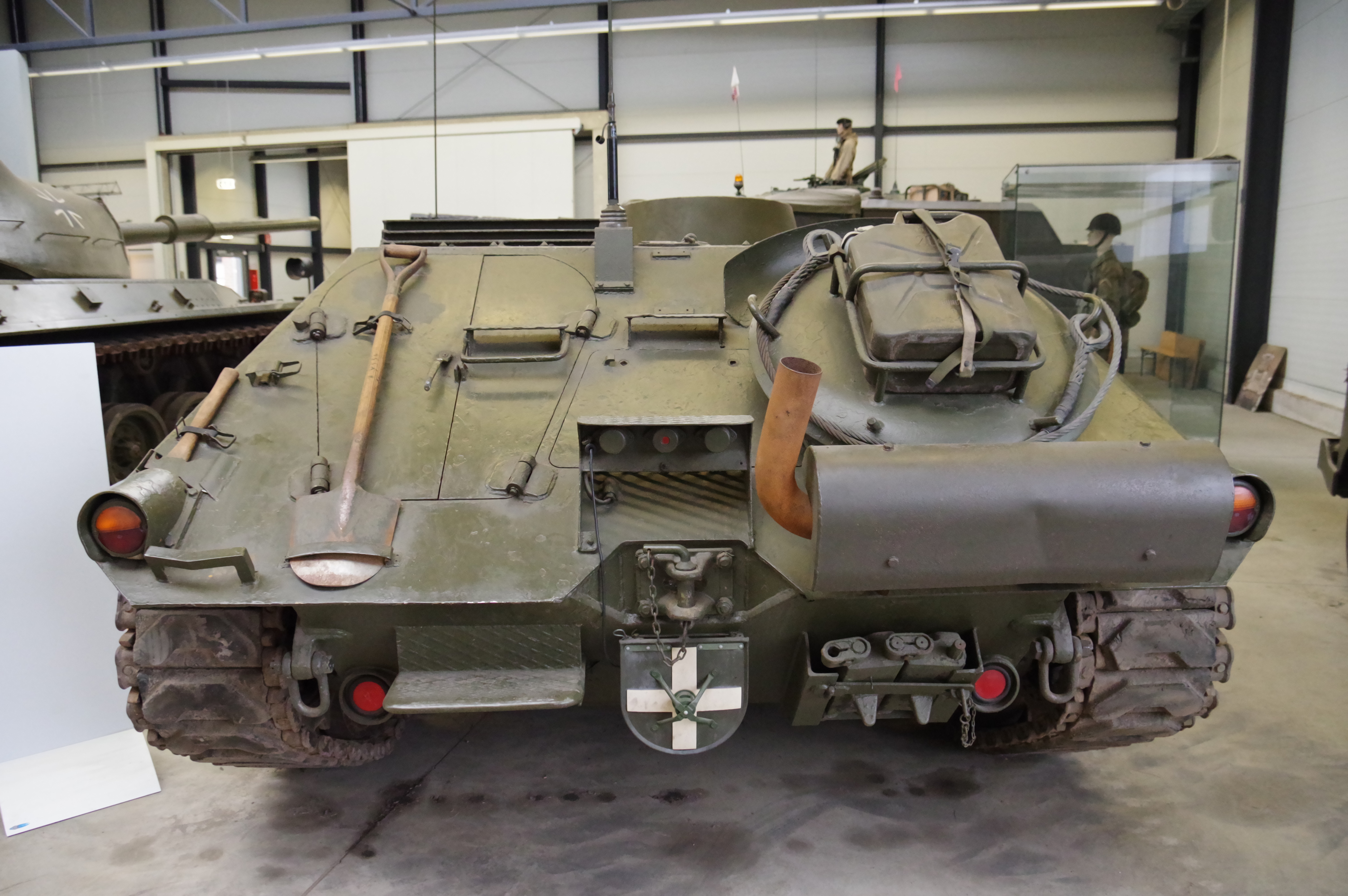
HS.30 rear with the double door on the left and the dome-shaped cover for the engine room ventilation on the right

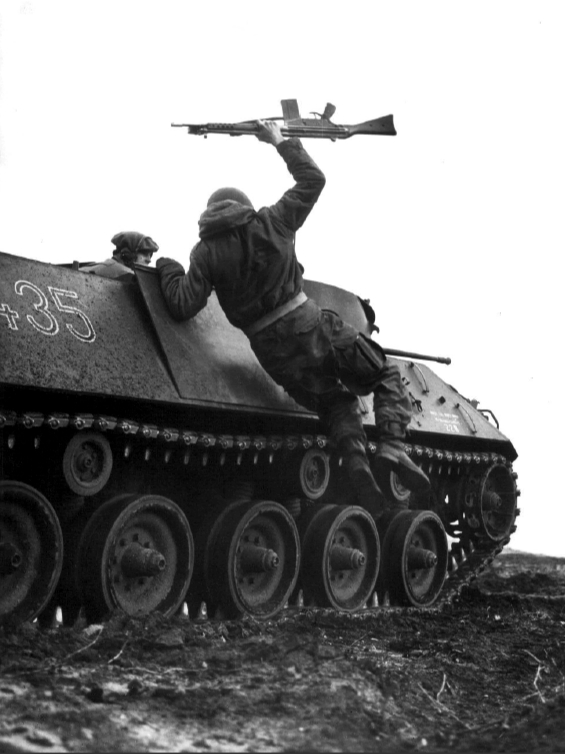
A German soldier disembarks from a HS.30 by jumping over its side.

After a series of substantial upgrades, the HS.30 was reported by the official investigation committee in the 1960s to meet the army's requirements "conditionally" ("bedingt"). By 1965, approximately 65 percent of the vehicles were operational, and by 1968, this number had increased to 85 percent. However, the issues with the early models were so severe that the Ministry of Defence had to provide its own technical personnel to bring the AFVs to operational status. The evaluation report included expert testimony and listed several technical problems with the HS.30:

- Transmission - The early production models were equipped with a SIDEBI transmission and later a Wilson transmission, both of which caused problems. Eventually, all vehicles were retrofitted with an Allison transmission in 1965/1966.
- Tracks - The Hispano-Suiza tracks were reported to be of an outdated design. A witness informed the investigators that the tracks were prone to excessive wear, requiring frequent removal of elements to compensate for track sag. Several witnesses preferred the tracks produced by Backhaus KG (later part of Diehl Metall), which were later installed on all HS.30s as an upgrade.

Other problems stemmed from the design itself:

- Speed - The Rolls-Royce B81 engine was reported to be underpowered, particularly when compared to the later Leopard 1 tank. However, when the HS.30 was introduced, it had a power-to-weight ratio theoretically comparable to the M41 tank with which it was supposed to operate. According to a technical officer who testified before the committee, the suspension on the front road wheels was too weak to handle the increased weight of the later AFVs when traversing rough terrain or crossing ditches, causing the helical springs in the coilovers to break. As a result, drivers had to proceed cautiously, effectively limiting the vehicle to a speed of 15–20 km/h (10-12.5 mph) off-road. Hispano-Suiza stated in the original requirements that the Bundeswehr had called for 20 hp per ton, which would have been satisfied by a 200 hp (150 kW) engine on the initial 10-ton design. However, the Ministry of Defence requested thicker armor (30 mm on the front and 20 mm on the sides), a heavier armament package (800 kg instead of the original 200 kg), and the capacity to carry a full squad of Panzergrenadiers, which made the vehicle longer and heavier.
- Engine maintenance - To gain full access to the engine, the entire rear section of the HS.30 had to be removed from the vehicle, which included the removal of both tracks, 64 bolts, and all connections. This made engine maintenance a time-consuming process compared to more modern vehicles.
- Disembarking - Infantry could exit the HS.30 through two large hatches on top, an escape hatch in the floor, and, initially, a door at the rear. However, this door became effectively unusable for troops because the designers blocked the passage between the door and the troop compartment with engine-related components. The standard method of exiting became climbing out on top and jumping over the sides. This not only exposed soldiers to potential enemy fire but was also dangerous due to the tracks protruding from the hull.

== Service ==
The HS.30 AFV was introduced into the Bundeswehr in late 1959 but experienced significant teething problems. Initially, the AFV was used to equip only individual battalions, which co-existed in the 1960s with two other types of Grenadier formations that were equipped with trucks or APCs.

Starting in 1974, the Marder IFV replaced the HS.30 in German armored infantry units. Peru received around 20 SPz HS.30s during the 1970s. Eventually, some HS.30s were repurposed as armored targets on gunnery ranges.

The Bundeswehr Museum of German Defense Technology in Koblenz has one of these "HS 30 Mörser" vehicles in its collection.

== Variants ==
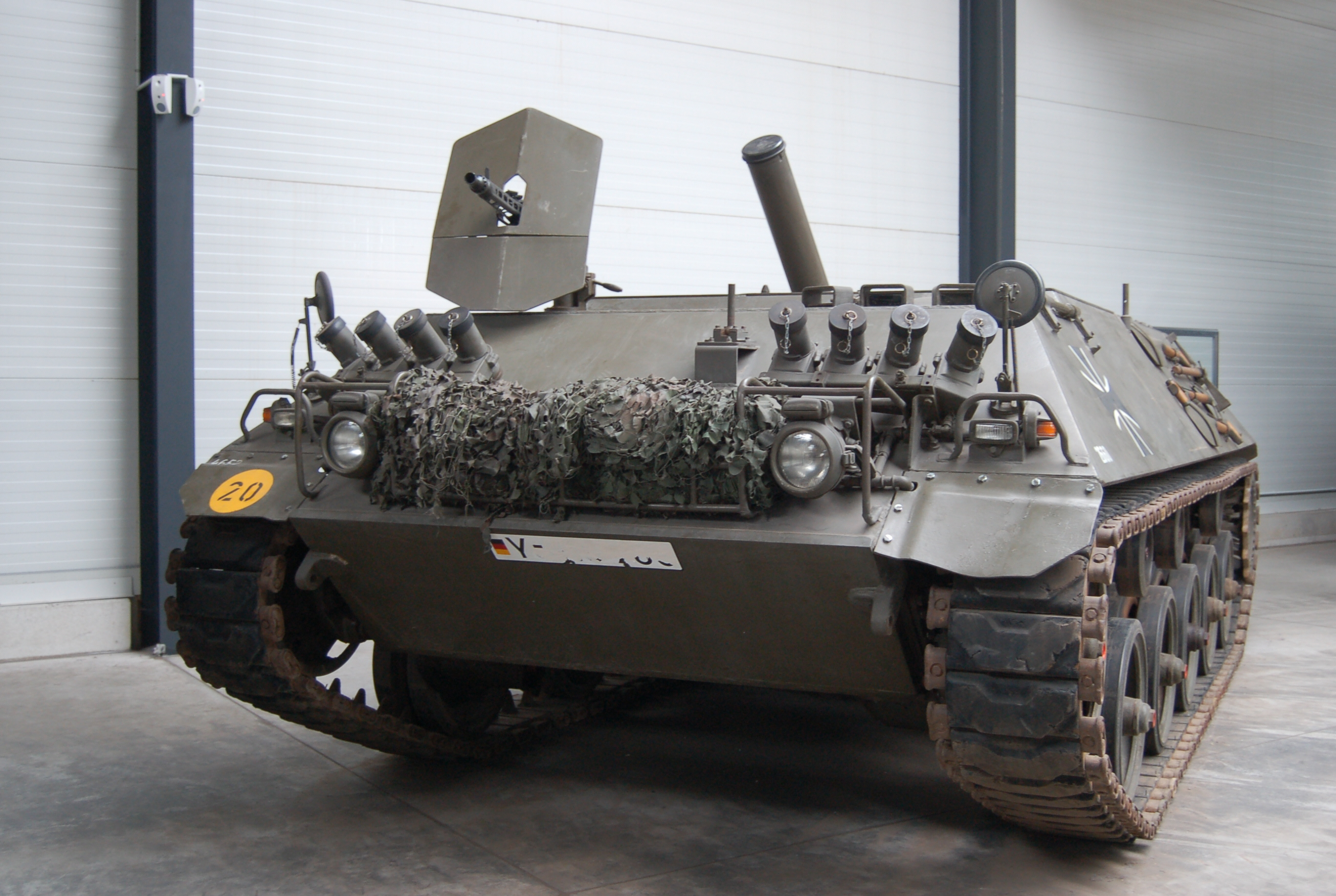
Schützenpanzer, lang, Typ 52-3 self-propelled mortar variant carrying a 120 mm Brandt mortar.

- Schützenpanzer, lang, Typ 12-3 (SPz lg 12-3, Gruppe) – Standard IFV variant
- Schützenpanzer, lang, Typ 12-3 mit 106 mm Leichtgeschütz M40A1 (SPz lg 12-3 LGS, Panzerabwehr) – Tank destroyer version with a 106 mm M40A1 recoilless rifle mounted on the roof in addition to the 20 mm cannon. Retrofit from 1965.
- Schützenpanzer, lang, Typ 21-3 (SPz lg 21-3, FüFu) (Note: FüFu is an abbreviation of Führung/Funk, German for "command/radio".) – Radio and command version
- Schützenpanzer, lang, Typ 51-3 (SPz lg 51-3, Panzermörser) – Self-propelled mortar version with an 81 mm mortar. Retrofit to Type 52-3 in 1966.
- Schützenpanzer, lang, Typ 52-3 (SPz lg 52-3, Panzermörser) – Self-propelled mortar version with a 120 mm mortar. Retrofit of Type 51-3 from 1966.
- Schützenpanzer, lang, Typ 81-3 (SPz lg 81-3, FLtPzArt) (Note: FLtPzArt is an abbreviation of Feuerleitpanzer Artillerie, German for "fire-control-tank artillery".) – Artillery forward observer version.
- Jagdpanzer, Typ 1-3 (JPz 1-3, Kanonenjagdpanzer) – Tank destroyer prototype based on the HS.30 chassis. Armed with a 90 mm DEFA cannon.
- Jagdpanzer, Rakete, Typ 3-3 (JPz 3-3, Raketenjagdpanzer) – Missile-armed tank destroyer vehicle based on the HS.30 chassis. Equipped with wire-guided Nord SS.11 missiles.
