= M114 armored fighting vehicle =

Armored personnel carrier

M114
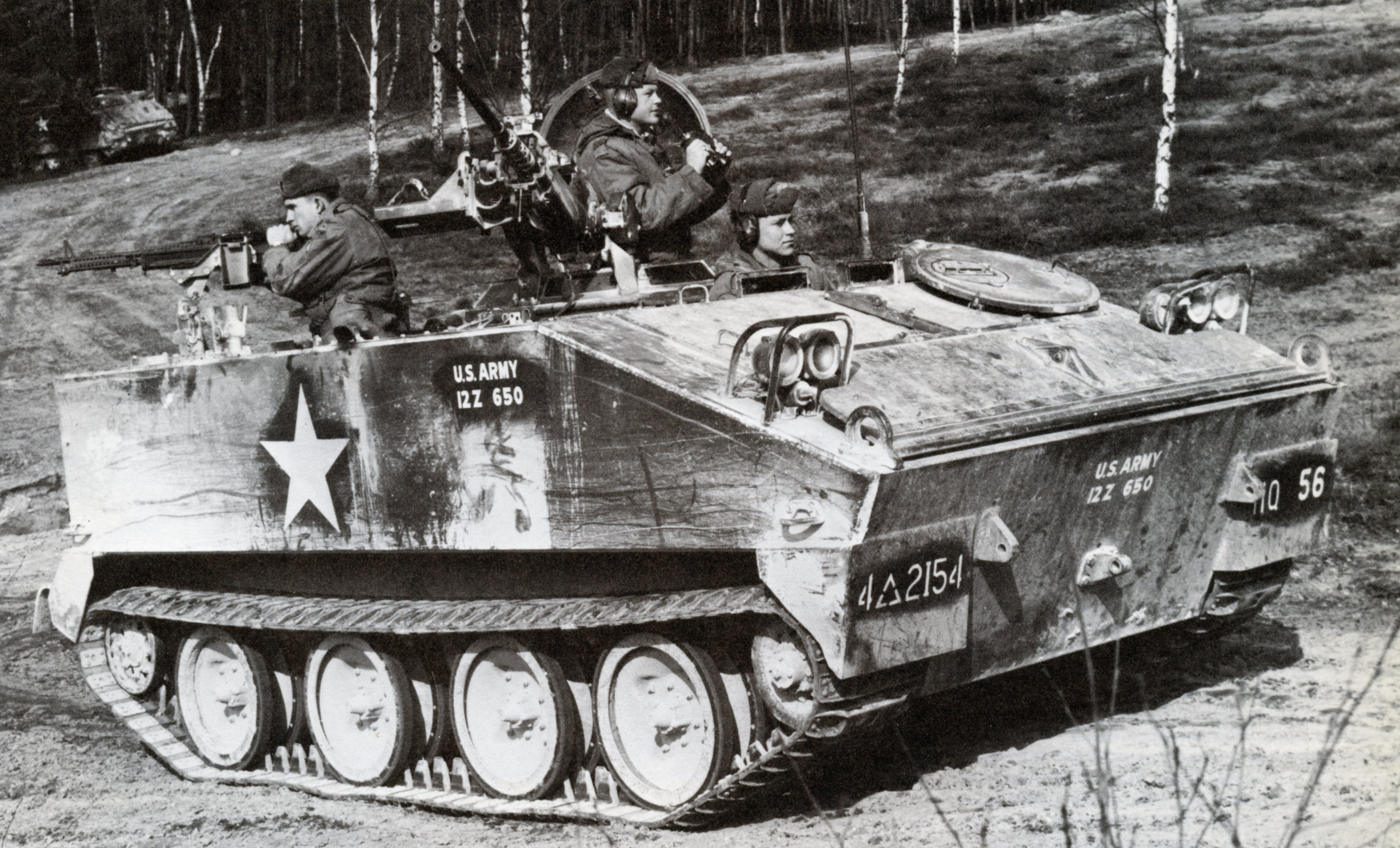
- M114A1 of the Armored Cavalry Platoon 2/54th Infantry, 4th Armored Division takes part in exercises in Grafenwöhr, Germany.
- Place of origin: United States

Service history
- In service: 1962–79
- Used by: United States
- Wars: Vietnam War; Salvadoran Civil War

Production history
- Manufacturer: General Motors, Cadillac Div.
- No. built: 3,710

Specifications
- Mass: 15,000 pounds (6,800 kg)
- Length: 4.46 m
- Width: 2.33 m
- Height: 2.39 m
- Crew: 3
- Armor: 44.5 mm
- Main armament: .50-caliber M2 machine gun
- Secondary armament: 7.62 mm M60 machine gun
- Engine: v8 gasoline 160 hp (120 kW)
- Power/weight: 23 hp/t
- Suspension: torsion-bar
- Operational range: 443 km
- Maximum speed: 58 km/h (36 m/h)

The M114 Command and Reconnaissance Carrier is a Cold War-era tracked armored fighting vehicle, used by the United States Army. It was manufactured by the Cadillac Division of General Motors in the early 1960s. The M114 was designed to be fast and stealthy for use in the recon role.

Like the larger M113, it was amphibious and could be deployed by parachute. However, unlike the M113 which became one of the most successful armoured vehicles, it quickly proved unsuited to use in the Vietnam War, and was replaced in the reconnaissance role by the M551 Sheridan light tank.

By 1979, it had been branded a failure and retired from the US Army, but some were released as surplus and continue to be used by police departments.

== Description ==
The M114 was a lightweight, low-silhouette vehicle, designed to complement the M113 in command and reconnaissance roles. The M114 was 4 inches lower than the M113, and its upper forward glacis plate had a shallower angle than on the M113, resulting in a somewhat sleeker profile. It was constructed of aluminum and weighed 13,100 lb (5.94 metric tons) empty, with a combat weight of 15,093 lb (6.846 metric tons). It was powered by a Chevrolet V-8 engine with a 283 cubic inch (4.6 liters) displacement. The engine was rated at 160 horsepower. It had a three-man crew, and a top speed of 36 mph (58 km/h). It could swim, propelled by its tracks, and was light enough to be transported by cargo aircraft and dropped by parachute.

In October 1961 the Army awarded General Motors Corporation two contracts totaling $14.9 million for the production of 1,215 T114s.

The original M114 required the commander's cupola hatch be opened to fire the .50 caliber machine gun, which rotated along with the hatch to allow aim in any direction. The updated M114A1 allowed the firing of the machine gun from the inside, utilizing manual traverse and elevating mechanisms. The M114A2 (aka M114A1E1) had a hydraulically powered cupola and mounted the M139 20mm cannon with greatly improved firepower. The observer in the rear had an M60 7.62mm machine gun mounted on a pedestal. There was stowage on the rear door for three M72A1 "LAW" anti-tank rockets.

== Vietnam War ==
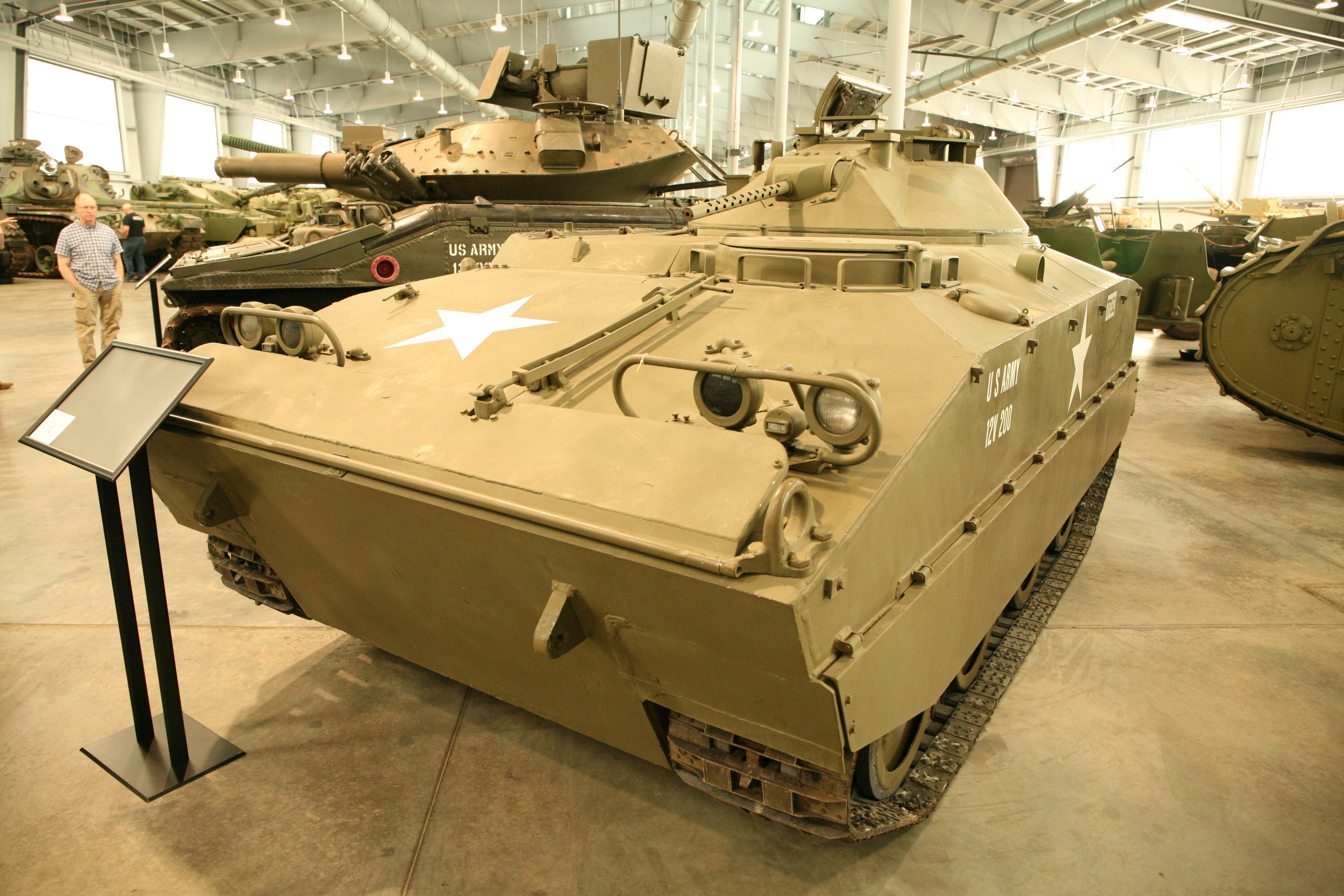
T114 prototype 3 at the U.S. Army Armor and Cavalry Collection, Fort Benning, in 2023

The M113 armored personnel carrier introduced in Vietnam in 1962 proved to be highly successful; consequently a similar smaller vehicle, the M114, was introduced in Vietnam the same year. The M113 equipped ARVN (South Vietnamese) mechanized rifle squadrons, while the M114 equipped reconnaissance squadrons; an ARVN reconnaissance squadron consisted of a headquarters troop and three letter (line) troops, each organized with six M114s. Eighty M114s were used to equip four reconnaissance squadrons.

During combat operations in Vietnam, the M114 armored reconnaissance vehicle proved to be mechanically unreliable, underpowered, had extreme difficulty conducting cross country operations owing to its poorly shaped hull protruding over the tracks causing the vehicle to frequently become stuck in terrain, and its lack of resistance to land mines. By November 1964, the M114s had been removed from Vietnam. The M114 continued to serve reconnaissance units throughout the U.S. Army. In 1973, Gen. Creighton Abrams branded the M114 a failure and ordered it retired from the US Army. However, ongoing budget constraints restricted and delayed procurement of sufficient replacement M113s, so the M114 remained in service until approximately 1979. The 3rd Armored Cavalry Regiment at Fort Bliss, TX was reportedly the last U.S. Army unit to replace their M114s with M113s in late 1979 or early 1980.

== Variants ==
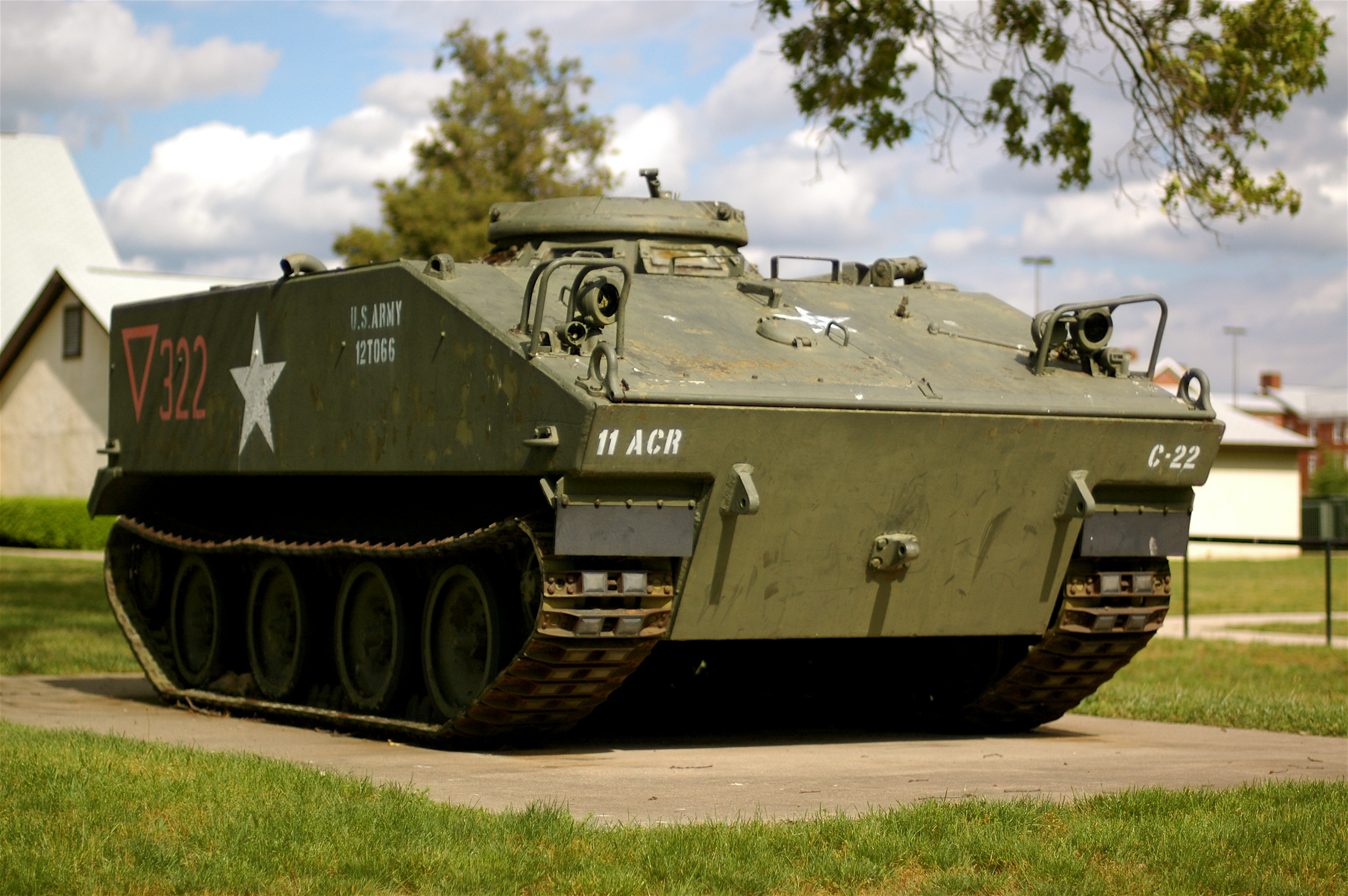
M114 in markings of the U.S. 11th Armored Cavalry Regiment on display at the Fort George G. Meade Museum

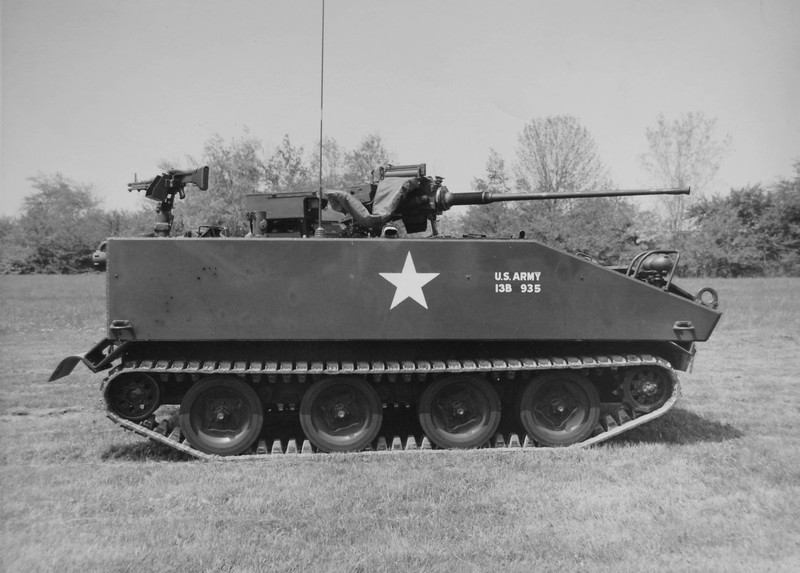
M114A2 with 20mm M139 Gun

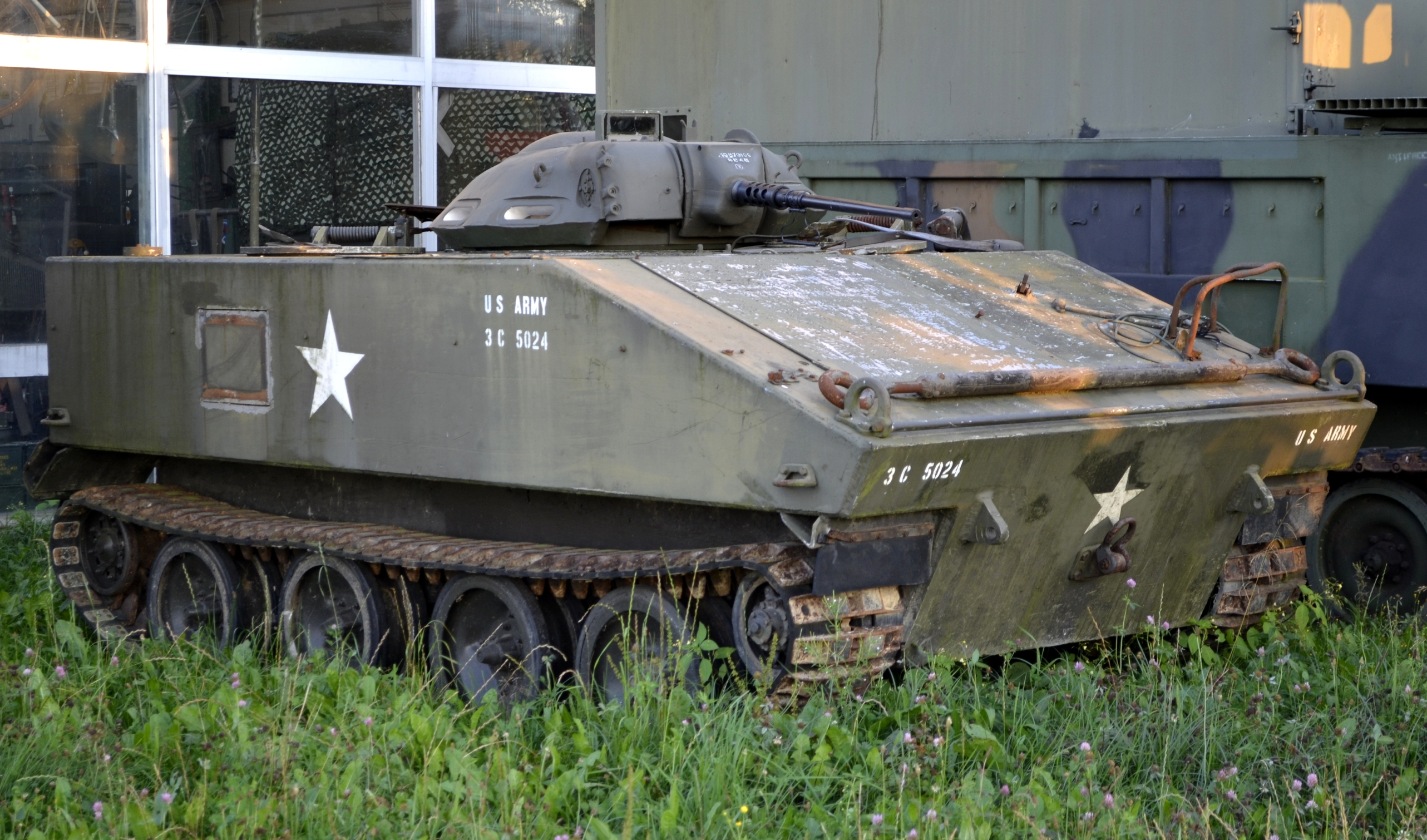
M114 with M19 tank commander cupola from M60 tank (experimental)

- T114 Test versions developed in the period 1957–60 with a M40 recoilless rifle, culminating in the prototype of what became the T114 (BAT)
- M114 Production version
- M114A1 – new commander's weapon station allowing firing of the .50-cal machine gun from inside (manually powered cupola), reinforced trim vane
- M114A2 – (1969, initially called M114A1E1) replaced main armament with a Hispano-Suiza HS.820 20 mm gun (designated M139 in U.S. service). Used a hydraulically powered cupola.
- T114 (BAT) - Tank Destroyer variant equipped with an autoloading version of the M40 106mm BAT (Battalion Anti-Tank) recoilless rifle. Only procured in small numbers. Apparently did not enter full series production.

== Operators ==
- United States – U.S. Army
- South Vietnam – Army of the Republic of Vietnam (ARVN)
- El Salvador – Salvadoran Army

== See also ==
- G-numbers (G300)
- List of U.S. military vehicles by model number
