= Schützenpanzer SPz 11-2 Kurz =

West German amored reconnaissance vehicle

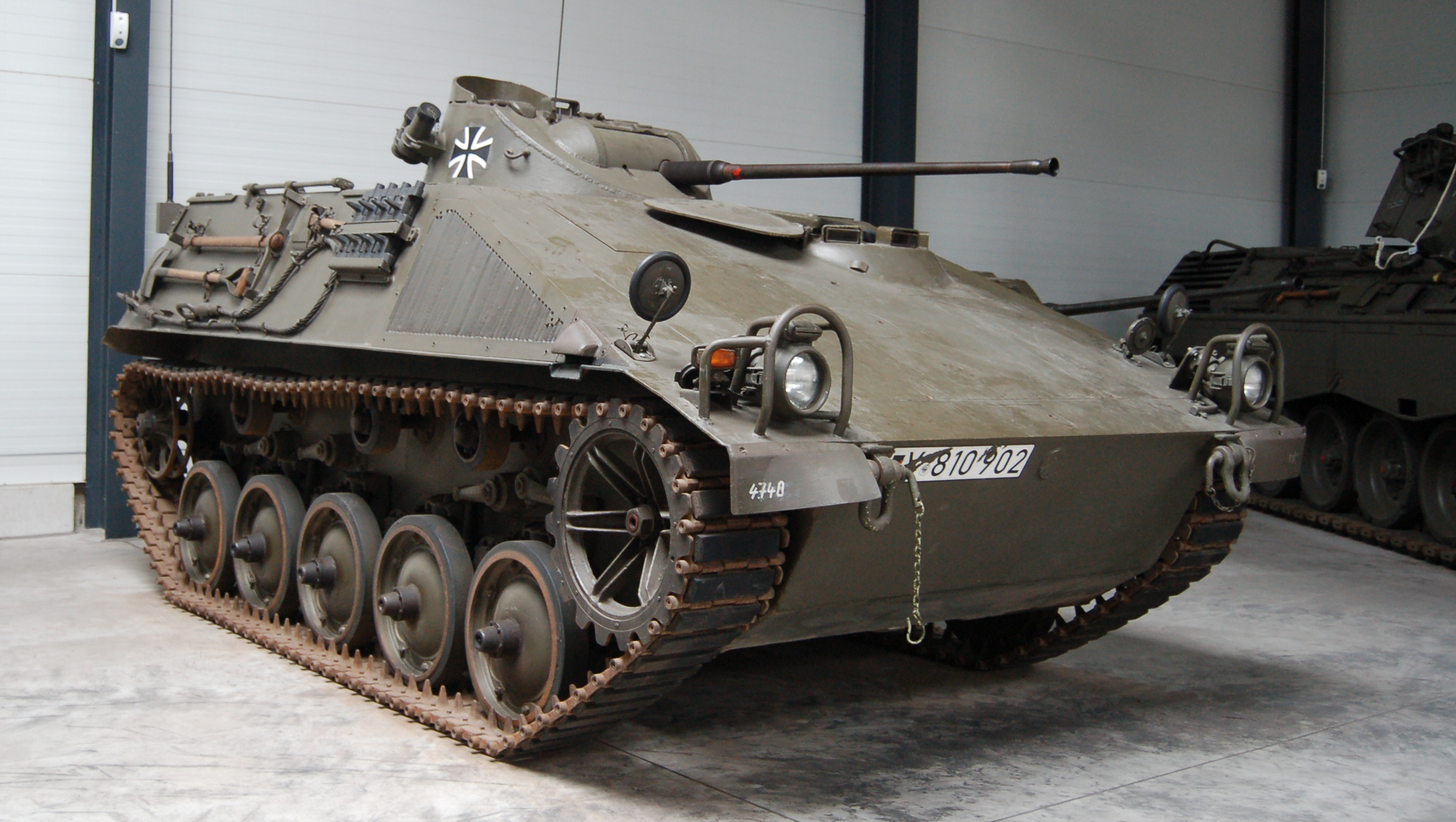
- Schützenpanzer Kurz at the German Tank Museum in Munster.
- Type: Armoured reconnaissance vehicle / infantry fighting vehicle
- Place of origin: France and West Germany

Service history
- In service: 1959–1987

Production history
- Designer: Hotchkiss et Cie
- Designed: 1950–1956
- Produced: 1959–1967

Specifications
- Mass: 8,200 kg (18,100 lb)
- Length: 4.51 m
- Width: 2.28 m
- Height: 1.97 m
- Crew: 5
- Armor: 15 mm at 62° of chrome-nickel-molybdenum
- Main armament: 1 x 20 mm Hispano-Suiza 820/L85 Cannon
- Secondary armament: 2 x 3 Smoke grenade launchers
- Engine: 1 x Hotchkiss et Cie 6-cylinder petrol engine 164 hp (122 kW)
- Suspension: torsion bar with shock absorbers and bumper stops
- Operational range: 390 km (244 miles)
- Maximum speed: 58 km/h

The Schützenpanzer SPz 11-2 Kurz armoured infantry fighting and reconnaissance vehicle was developed for the West German army and was a minor modification of a French-designed vehicle (Hotchkiss SP1A). During the period between 1959 and 1967, the West German army received some 2,374 of these light armoured vehicles with the SPz 11-2 Kurz being developed as the reconnaissance version. The SPz 11-2 was replaced in the IFV role by the Marder and in the reconnaissance role by the Spähpanzer Luchs. The SPz 11-2 saw service with the West German army only.

Its designator "Schützenpanzer Halbgruppe" already hinted on its combat role as the Infantry Fighting Vehicle ("Schützenpanzer") of a Squad ("Halbgruppe", literally "half a section", or Trupp). It was introduced besides the Schützenpanzer lang HS-30.

== Armament ==
The SPz 11-2 shared its armament with the contemporary Schützenpanzer Lang HS.30. Both vehicles were equipped with almost identical turrets, carrying the 20 mm Hispano-Suiza 820 L/85 cannon. The cannon had a 15x15 periscopic sight. 180 rounds of 20 mm ammunition were carried in a belt, 18 shots of Armour-piercing ammunition were carried in three six shot box magazines.

Up to six smoke grenade launchers were installed after 1962 to provide tactical and emergency concealment on the Spz 11-2.

== Problems ==
The Spz 11-2 suffered from a multitude of design limitations: The vehicles were very slow in reverse speed, reaching only up to 6 km/h, which is around Preferred walking speed, making it difficult to disengage when attacked. The engine was loud, complicating the designated reconnaissance role. The road wheel support arms, the forward rolling wheels were mounted on, were prone to breaking, if the Spz 11-2 drove into a ditch at higher speeds. The electrical system was insufficient, forcing the crew to power up the entire on-board grid, including the ignition coil, whenever they wanted to use the radio. In combination with poorly protected circuits this could result in a short circuit.

The 20 mm cannon in the cramped turret made a change of type of ammunition fired a time consuming process, in which tools were needed.

== Variants ==
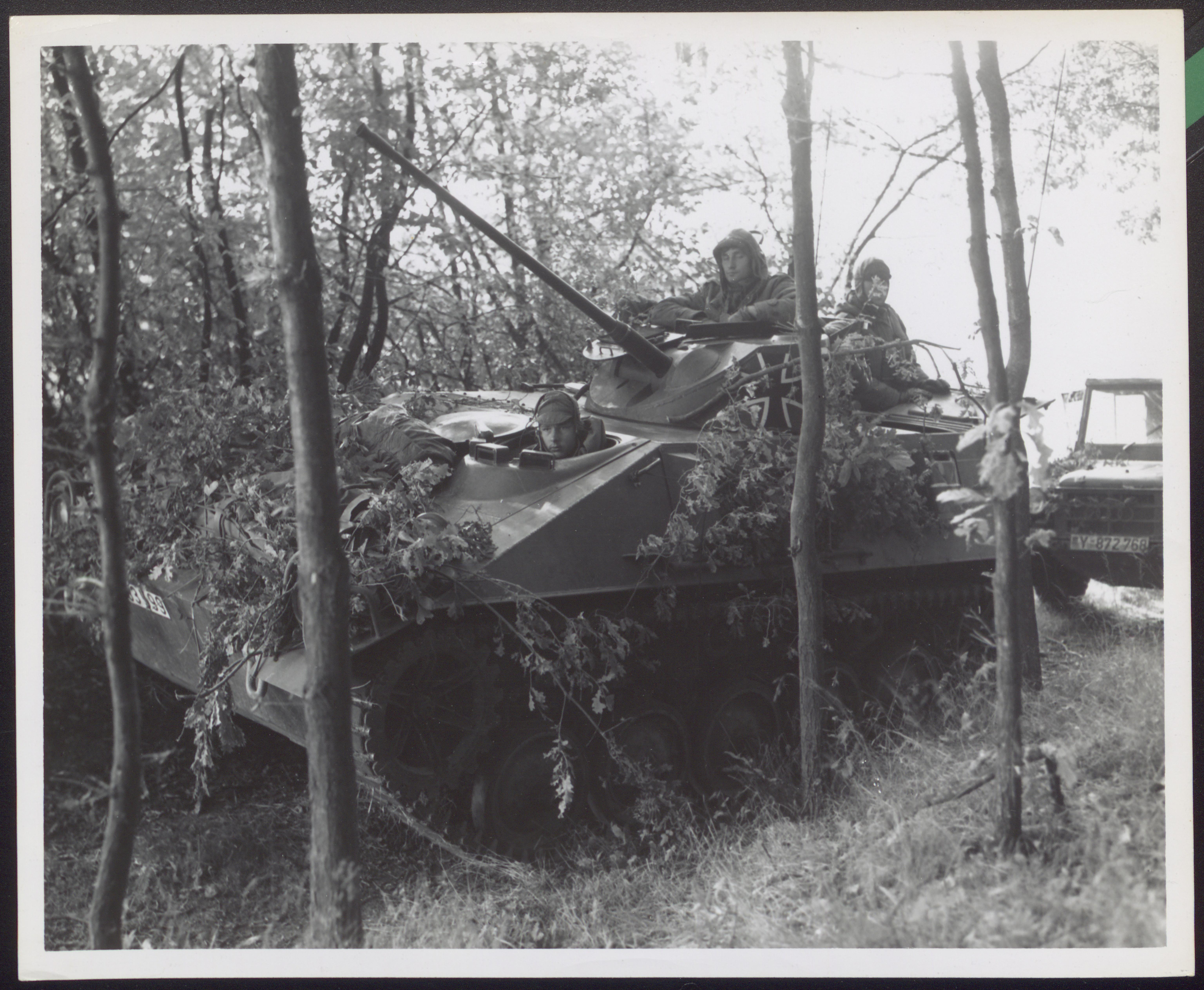
Schützenpanzer SPz 11-2 Kurz

- Sanitätspanzer kurz 2-2 - Medevac vehicle.
- Beobachtungspanzer 22-2 - Forward observer vehicle.
- Mörserträger 51-2 - 81 mm mortar carrier.
- Radarpanzer 91-2 - Vehicle equipped with AN/TPS-33 radar.
- Nachschubpanzer 42-1 - Supply vehicle with four road wheels, originally the Hotchkiss CC-2-55 design. Used from 1958 until 1962.
- Spähpanzer SP I.C. - Light tank armed with a 90 mm gun (prototype only)

== Service ==
The SPz 11-2 was used from 1960 to 1974 by the cannon platoons of the Panzergrenadiers (armored infantry battalions). It was used afterwards as a reconnaissance vehicle until 1982. The vehicle was never exported to other countries.

== Operators ==
=== Former operators ===
- West Germany: Used by Bundeswehr until 1987.
