= Panzergrenadier =

German mechanized infantry

Panzergrenadier
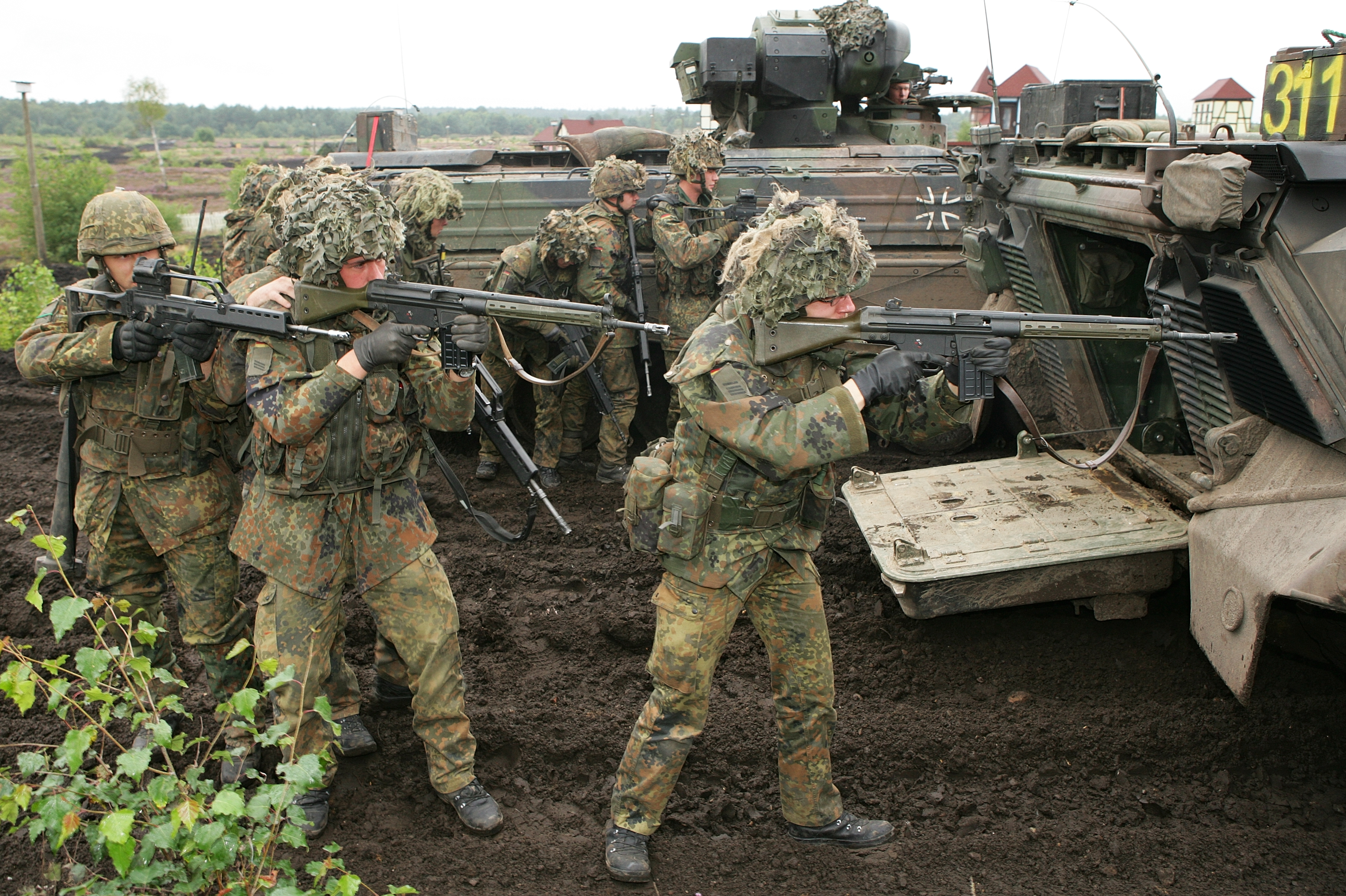
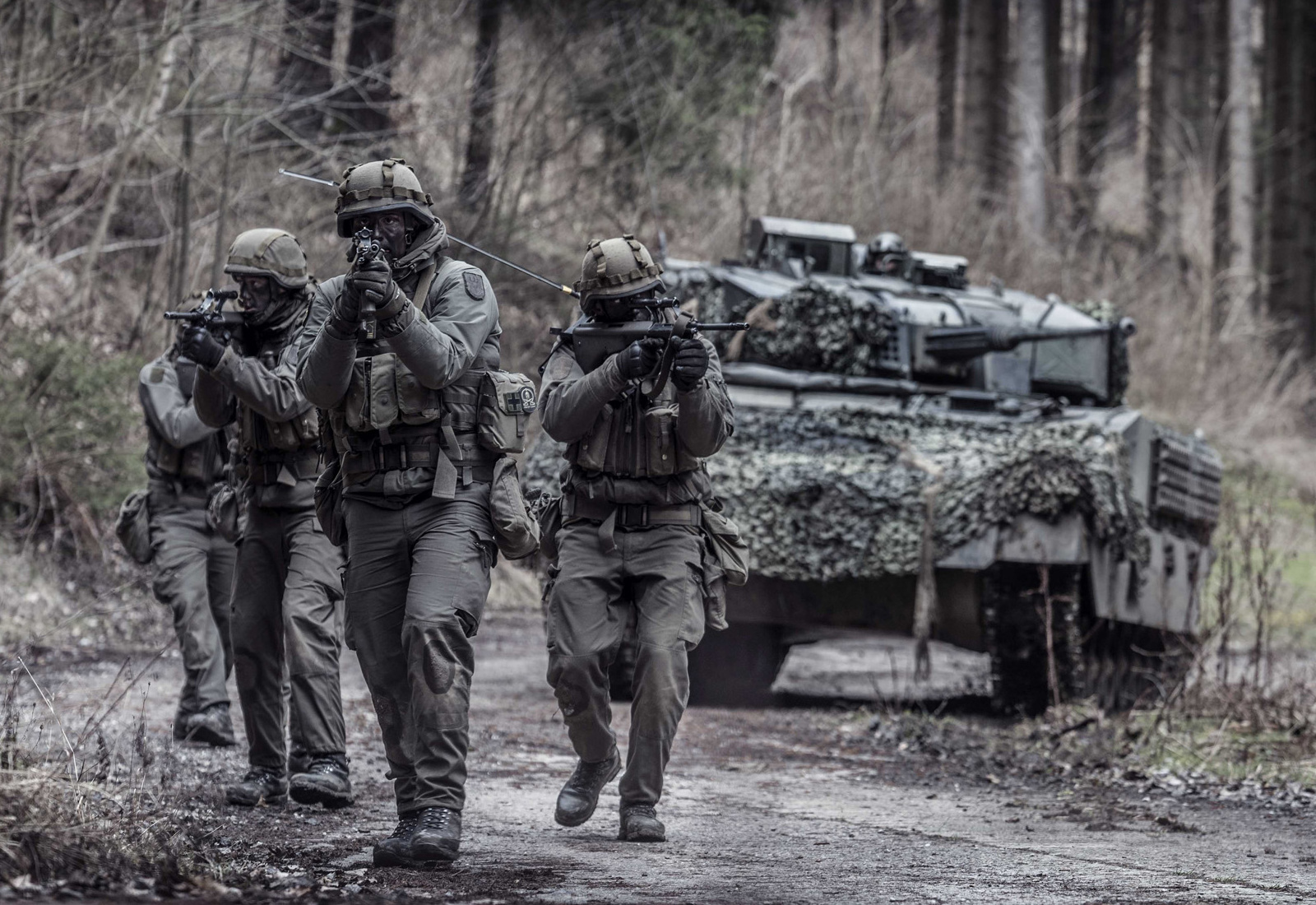
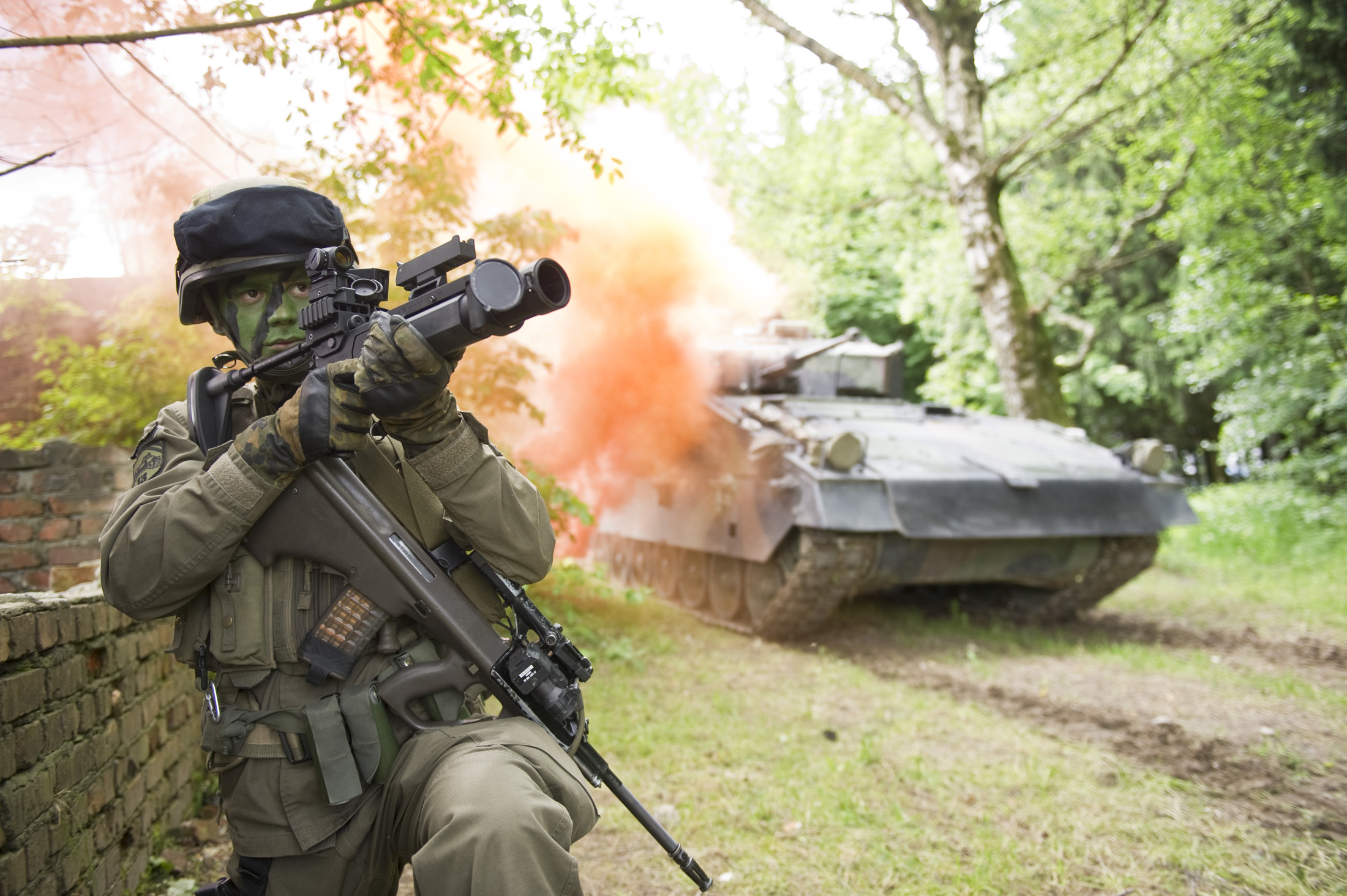
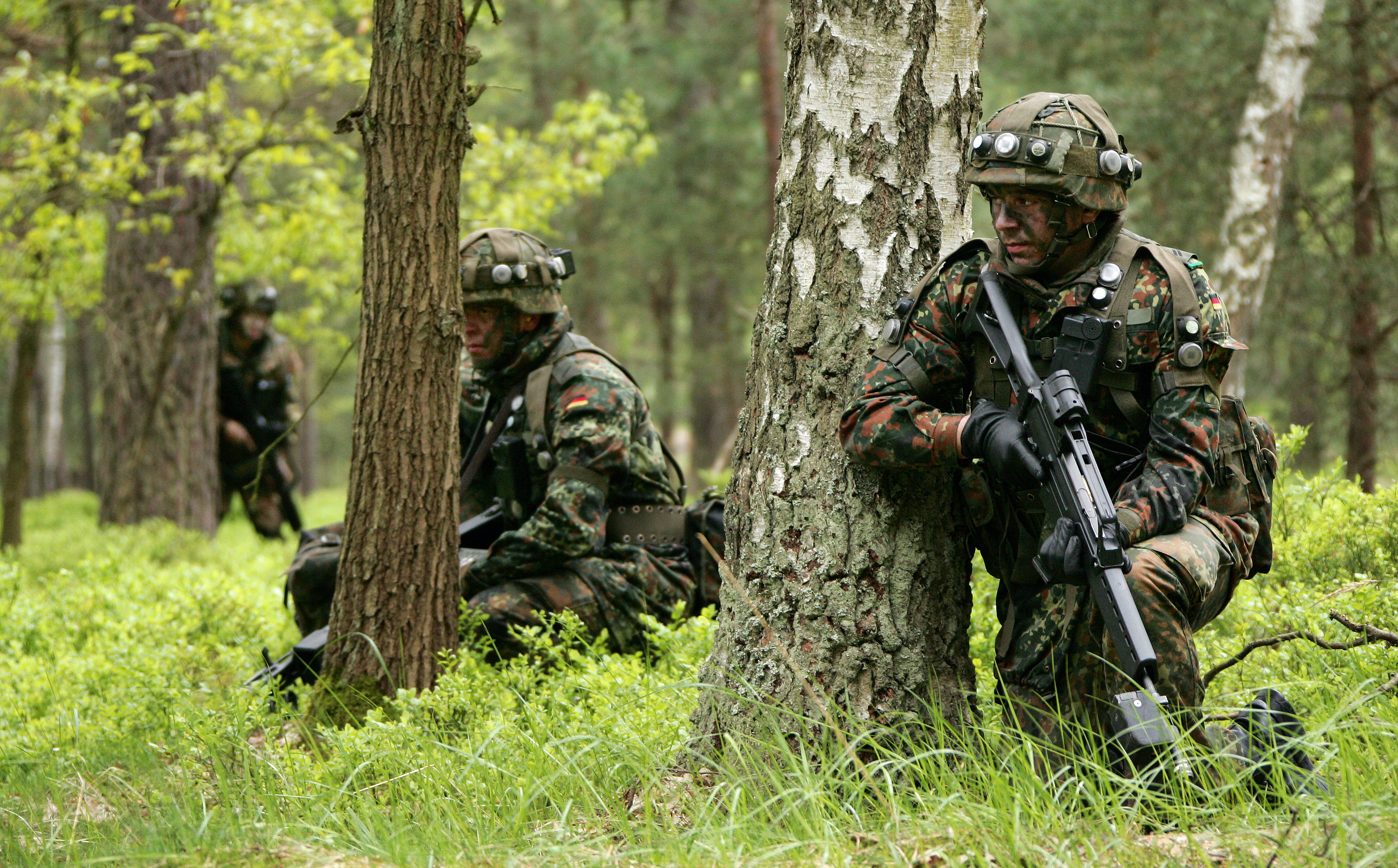
- Top left: German Bundeswehr Panzergrenadiers behind a Schützenpanzer Marder.
- Top right: Austrian Bundesheer Panzergrenadier in front of a Schützenpanzer Ulan in 2016.
- Lower left: Austrian Bundesheer Panzergrenadier in front of a Schützenpanzer Ulan.
- Lower right: German Bundeswehr Panzergrenadiers during a training exercise at the Jägerbrück Training Area in Mecklenburg-Vorpommern, 2010.

Panzergrenadier, abbreviated as PzG (WWII) or PzGren (modern), meaning "Armour"-ed fighting vehicle "Grenadier", is the German term for the military doctrine of mechanized infantry units in armoured forces who specialize in fighting from and in conjunction with infantry fighting vehicles (IFVs) – that is, armoured troop carriers designed to carry a mechanized squad of six to eight soldiers into, during and out of combat while providing direct fire support for those troops.

The doctrine originated primarily in Germany before World War II and is today used by name in the countries of Germany, Austria, Switzerland and Sweden.

== Doctrine ==
Swedish Panzergrenadiers displaying mounted and dismounted combat with strf 90C IFVs.

Panzergrenadier combat is conducted in close cooperation with IFVs. Each Panzergrenadier squad has its own designated IFV during battle. Combat can be conducted either from within the vehicle via portholes in the walls or hatches on the roof etc., so-called mounted combat, or from outside the vehicle in its vicinity using dismount-hatches at the back of the vehicle, so-called dismounted combat.

Combat missions consist of ambushing, fire support, reconnaissance, spearhead attacks, etc. Depending on the armament, the IFV can have a varying degree of active participation in the battle. Early examples simply featured a pair of rifle-calibre machine guns. Modern day examples traditionally use medium-caliber (20–60 mm (0.79–2.36 in)) autocannons and integrated missile-systems in a revolving turret. Unlike traditional mechanized infantry, Panzergrenadiers do not use armoured personnel carriers (APC) in their doctrine, as APCs are intended as "armoured taxis" and by design lack the ability for mounted combat.

=== Use ===
The Panzergrenadier doctrine and name is primarily used in the armies of Germany, Austria, Switzerland and Sweden, in the latter under the native forms "pansarskytte" (Swedish: skytte = German: schützen) and "pansarinfanteri" ("armour infantry"). In the modern German Army, Panzergrenadier (Pzg) is the lowest rank of enlisted men (Mannschaften) in the Panzergrenadiertruppe, comparable to NATO Other Rank-1 level.

=== History ===
The Panzergrenadier doctrine was introduced by the German Army during the second half of the 1930s, initially being simple infantry (German: Schützen) belonging to the armoured force (so-called "armour infantry"), serving either as mechanized or motorized infantry depending on their mode of transportation (armoured half-tracks vs unarmoured trucks). Half-tracks (German: Schützenpanzerwagen) such as the Sd.Kfz. 251 were the preferred vehicle of transportation for the armour infantry, but due to shortages, most units had to be transported in trucks as motorised infantry. The role of the armour infantry was to escort and protect the armoured force from enemy infantry, allowing allied armour to deal with heavier threats. Mounted combat in IFVs could also be used in advancing assaults on to the enemy flanks. The success of this tactic during the first years of World War II led to the introduction of a new troop type specialising in IFV combat, called "Panzergrenadier". All mechanized and motorised infantry in the armoured force were reclassified as such in 1942, changing their classification from infantry to armoured unit.

Sweden also adopted the Panzergrenadier doctrine in 1942, to some extent independently, although lacking dedicated infantry fighting vehicles until 1943.

== German Wehrmacht ==
=== Forerunners (Schützen) ===
The term Panzergrenadier was not adopted until 1942. Infantry in panzer divisions from 1937 onwards were known as Schützen (literally in German: Gunners) Regiments; they wore the same rose pink piping on their uniforms as the tank crews (with an "S" cypher that distinguished the Schützen from the tank and anti-tank units that also wore that colour). Soldiers in special Motorized Infantry units wore the standard white piping of the Infantry. In 1942, when Infantry Regiments were renamed as Grenadier Regiments by Hitler as a historical homage to Frederick the Great's Army, the Schützen regiments (and the soldiers in them) began to be redesignated as Panzergrenadier regiments, as did Motorized Infantry units and soldiers. Their Waffenfarbe was also changed from either white (in the case of Motorized Infantry) or rose pink to a meadow-green shade previously worn by motorcycle troops. Some units did not change over their designations and/or Waffenfarbe accoutrements until 1943, and many veteran Schützen ignored regulations and kept their rose-pink until the end of the war.

=== Wehrmacht Panzergrenadiers during World War II ===
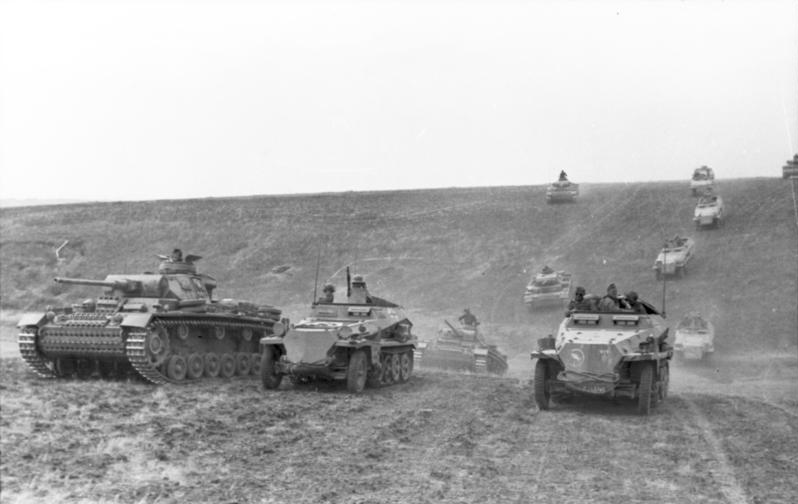
German Panzergrenadiers in halftracks along with tanks on the eastern front.

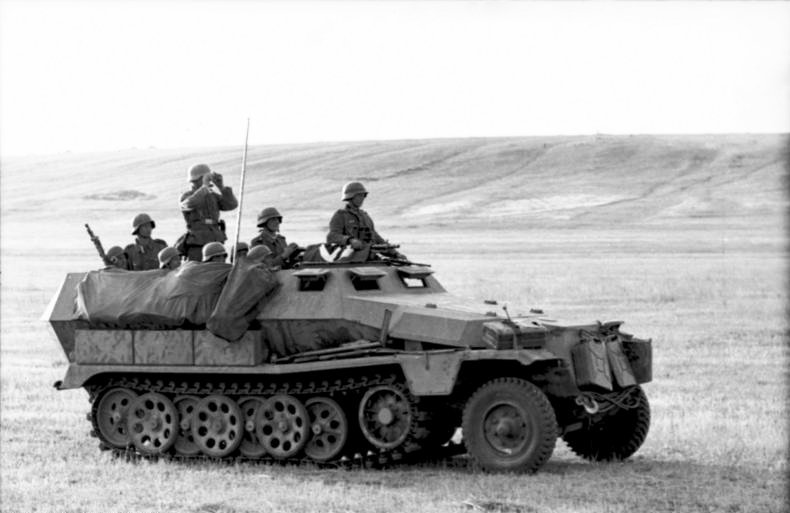
German Panzergrenadiers mounted on a Sd.Kfz. 251 armoured half-track.

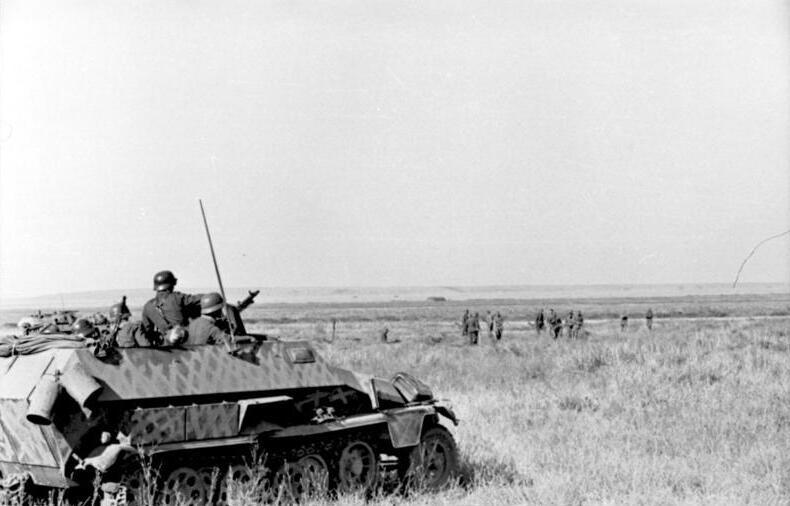
German Panzergrenadiers and their Sd.Kfz. 251 armoured half-track in the Soviet Union, August 1942.

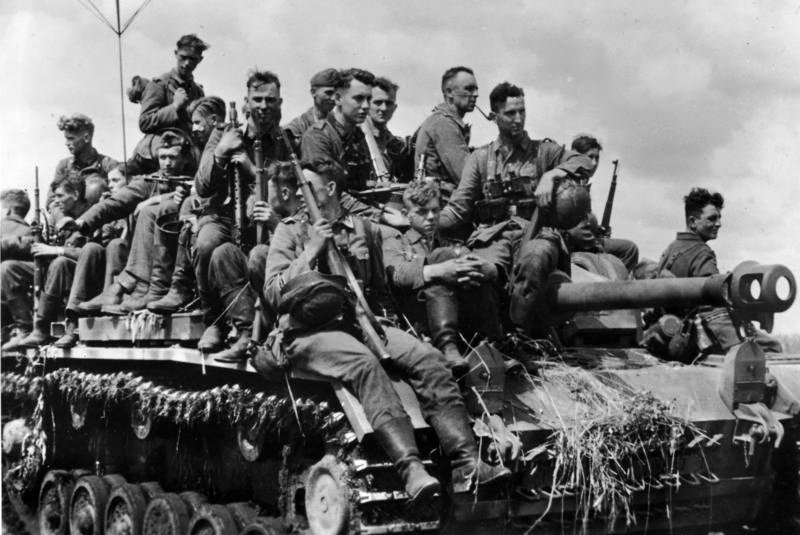
German panzergrenadiers riding on a StuG IIIG assault gun.

The term Panzergrenadier had been introduced in 1942, and was applied equally to the infantry component of Panzer divisions as well as the new divisions known as Panzergrenadier Divisions. Most of the Heer's PzGren. divisions evolved via upgrades from ordinary infantry divisions, first to Motorized Infantry divisions and then to PzGren. divisions, retaining their numerical designation within the series for infantry divisions throughout the process. This included the 3rd, 10th, 14th, 15th, 16th, 18th, 20th, 25th, and 29th divisions. Others, such as the Großdeutschland Division, were built up over the course of the war by repeatedly augmenting the size of an elite regiment or battalion. The Waffen-SS also created several PzGren. divisions by the same methods, or by creating new divisions from scratch later in the war. A number of PzGren. divisions in both the Heer and Waffen-SS were upgraded to Panzerwaffe divisions as the war progressed.

The Panzergrenadier divisions were organized as combined arms formations, usually with six battalions of truck-mounted infantry organized into either two or three regiments, a battalion of tanks, and an ordinary division's complement of artillery, reconnaissance units, combat engineers, anti-tank and anti-aircraft artillery, and so forth. All these support elements would also be mechanized in a PzGren. division, though most of the artillery, anti-tank, and anti-aircraft elements were equipped with weapons towed by trucks rather than the relatively rare armored and self-propelled models. In practice the PzGren. divisions were often equipped with heavy assault guns rather than tanks, one armoured regiment with three battalions of 14 assault guns each, due to a chronic shortage of tanks throughout the German armed forces. A few elite units, on the other hand, might have the tanks plus a battalion of heavy assault guns for their anti-tank element, and armored carriers for some of their infantry battalions as well.

On paper a Panzergrenadier division had one tank battalion less than a Panzer division, but two more infantry battalions, and thus was almost as strong as a Panzer division, especially on the defensive. Of 226 panzergrenadier battalions in the whole of the German Army, Luftwaffe and Waffen SS in September 1943, only 26 were equipped with armoured half tracks, or just over 11 percent. The rest were equipped with trucks.

=== List of Wehrmacht and SS Panzergrenadier divisions ===
- 3rd Panzergrenadier Division
- 10th Panzergrenadier Division
- 15th Panzergrenadier Division
- 16th Panzergrenadier Division
- 18th Panzergrenadier Division
- 20th Panzergrenadier Division
- 25th Panzergrenadier Division
- 29th Panzergrenadier Division
- 90th Panzergrenadier Division
- 233rd Panzergrenadier Division
- Panzergrenadier Division Brandenburg
- Panzergrenadier Division Feldherrnhalle
- Panzergrenadier Division Großdeutschland
- Fallschirm-Panzergrenadier Division 2 Hermann Göring (Luftwaffe)
- SS Panzergrenadier Division Leibstandarte SS Adolf Hitler
- 3rd SS Panzergrenadier Division Totenkopf
- 4th SS Polizei Panzergrenadier Division
- 9th SS Panzergrenadier Division Hohenstaufen
- 11th SS Volunteer Panzergrenadier Division Nordland
- 16th SS Panzergrenadier Division Reichsführer-SS
- 17th SS Panzergrenadier Division Götz von Berlichingen
- 18th SS Volunteer Panzergrenadier Division Horst Wessel
- 23rd SS Volunteer Panzergrenadier Division Nederland
- 28th SS Volunteer Panzergrenadier Division Wallonien
- 38th SS Panzergrenadier Division Nibelungen

=== Wehrmacht Panzergrenadier equipment ===
The use of armoured half-tracks was rare in the German Army, and even the elite Großdeutschland Division, with two panzergrenadier regiments, only mustered a few companies' worth of the vehicles, generally Sd.Kfz. 251 troop carriers. The vast majority of Schützen/Panzergrenadier soldiers were mounted in trucks. Additionally, vehicles in the early war period suffered from poor off-road performance.

In 1944 a couple of Panzer Divisions based in France had more than the standard one battalion mounted in Sd.Kfz. 251 troop carriers. The Panzer Lehr Division's infantry and engineers were entirely mounted in Sd.Kfz. 251 troop carriers, while the 1st Battalion in both Panzergrenadier regiments in 2. Panzer Division and 21. Panzer Division were half-equipped with armoured halftracks (Sd.Kfz. 251 troop carriers for 2. Panzer, U304(f) light armoured personnel carriers for 21. Panzer).

== German Bundeswehr ==
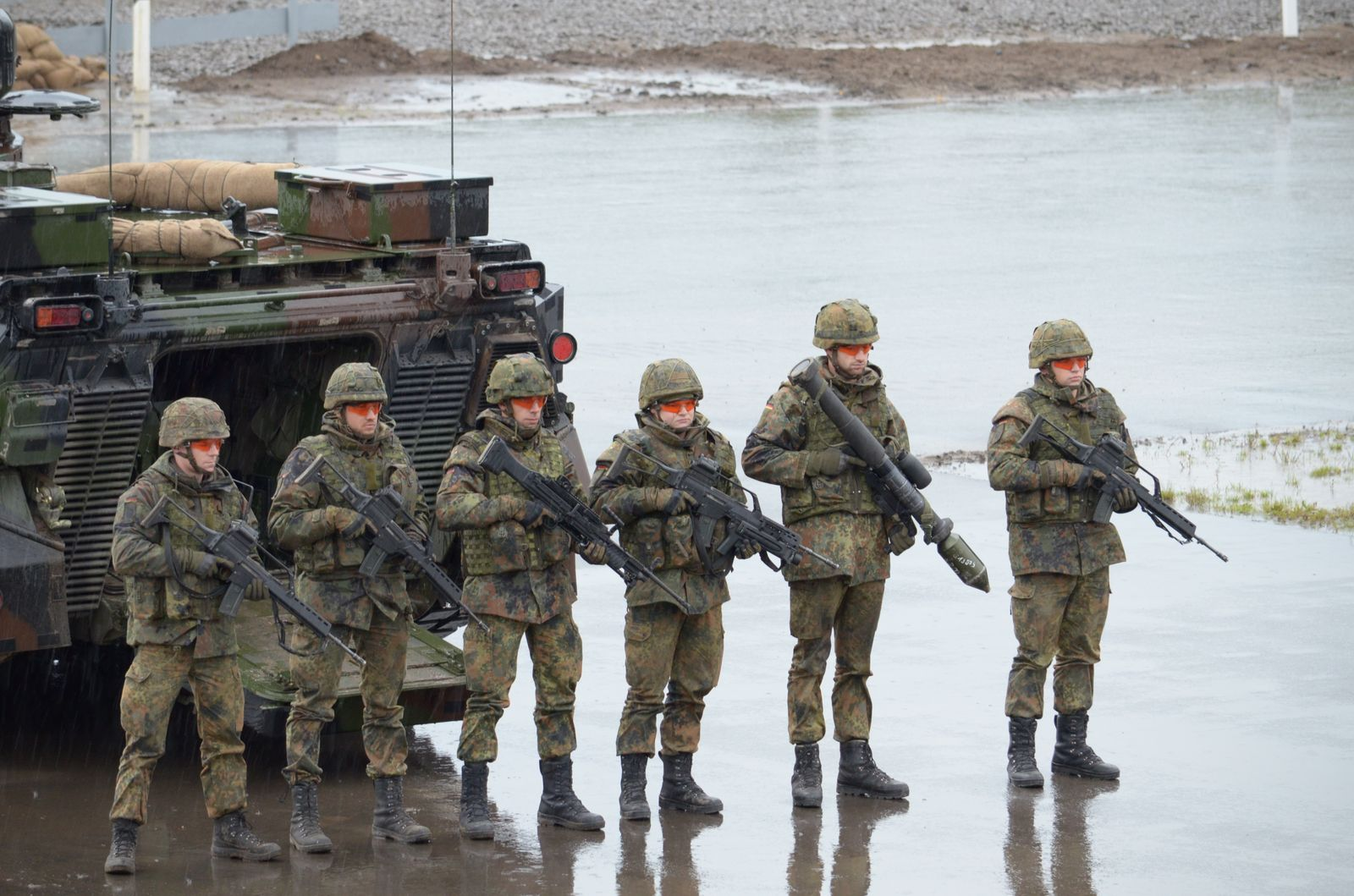
Bundeswehr Panzergrenadier squad in 2012.

When the armed forces of West Germany was formed as the Bundeswehr in late 1955, it was decided to readopt the Panzergrenadier doctrine instead of adopting the American doctrine of mechanized infantry using armoured personnel carriers as simple "battlefield taxis" and not as assault vehicles. This led to the development of the Schützenpanzer, lang, Typ 12-3 infantry fighting vehicle, introduced in 1960, followed by the Schützenpanzer Marder 1 in 1971, the cancelled Marder 2 in 1991, and the Schützenpanzer Puma in 2010.

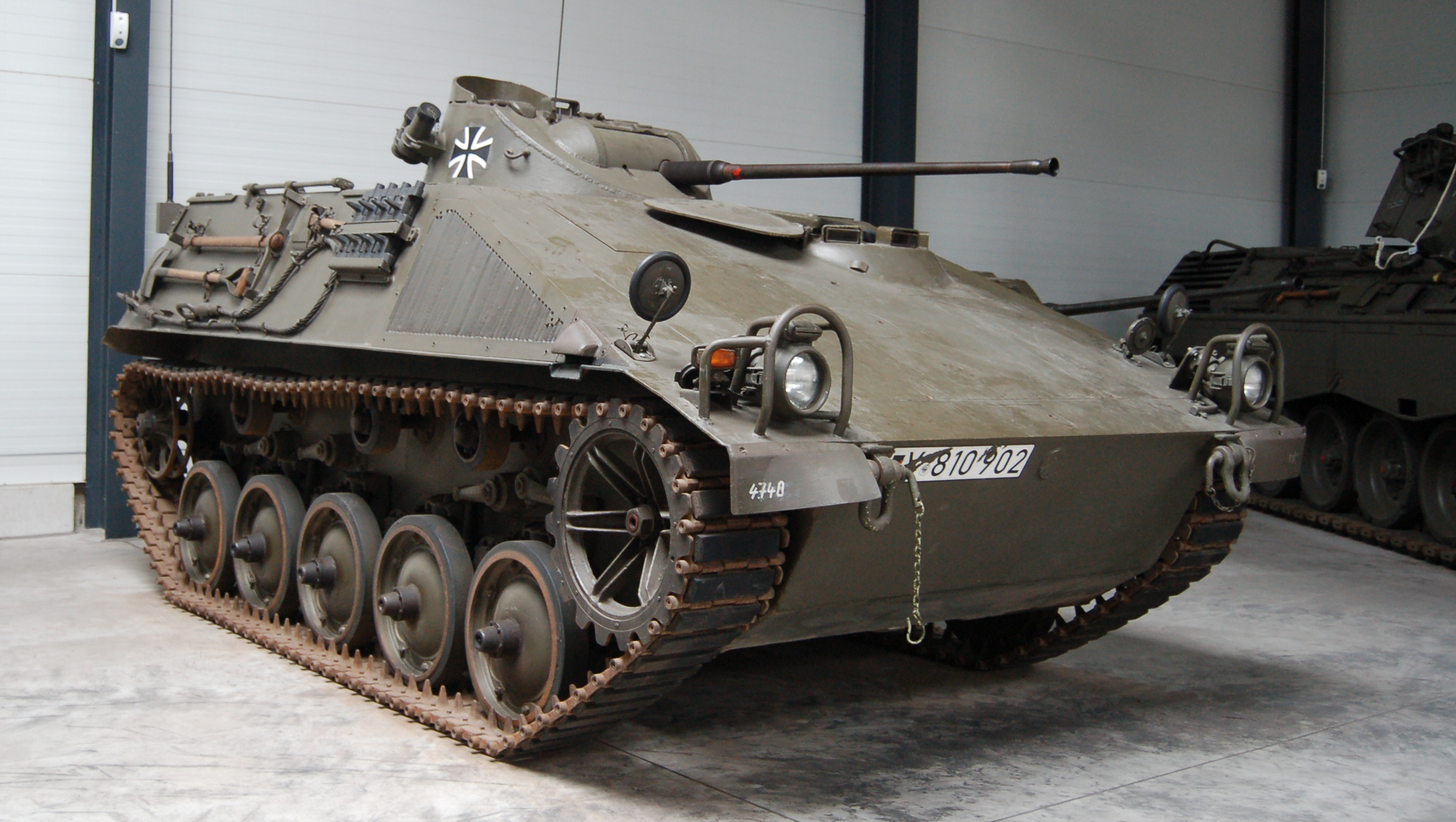
SPz 11-2 Kurz

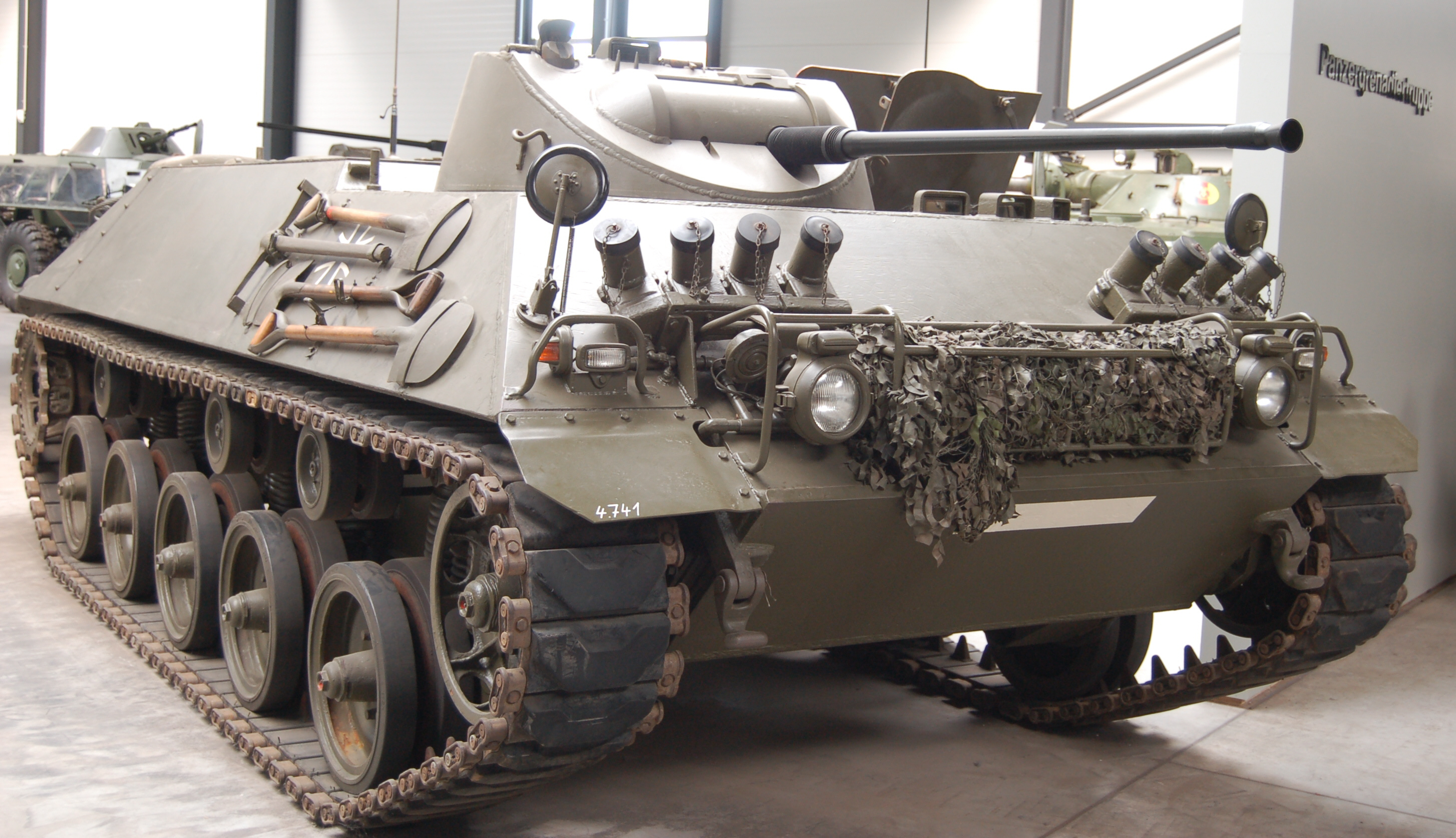
SPz 13-3 Lang

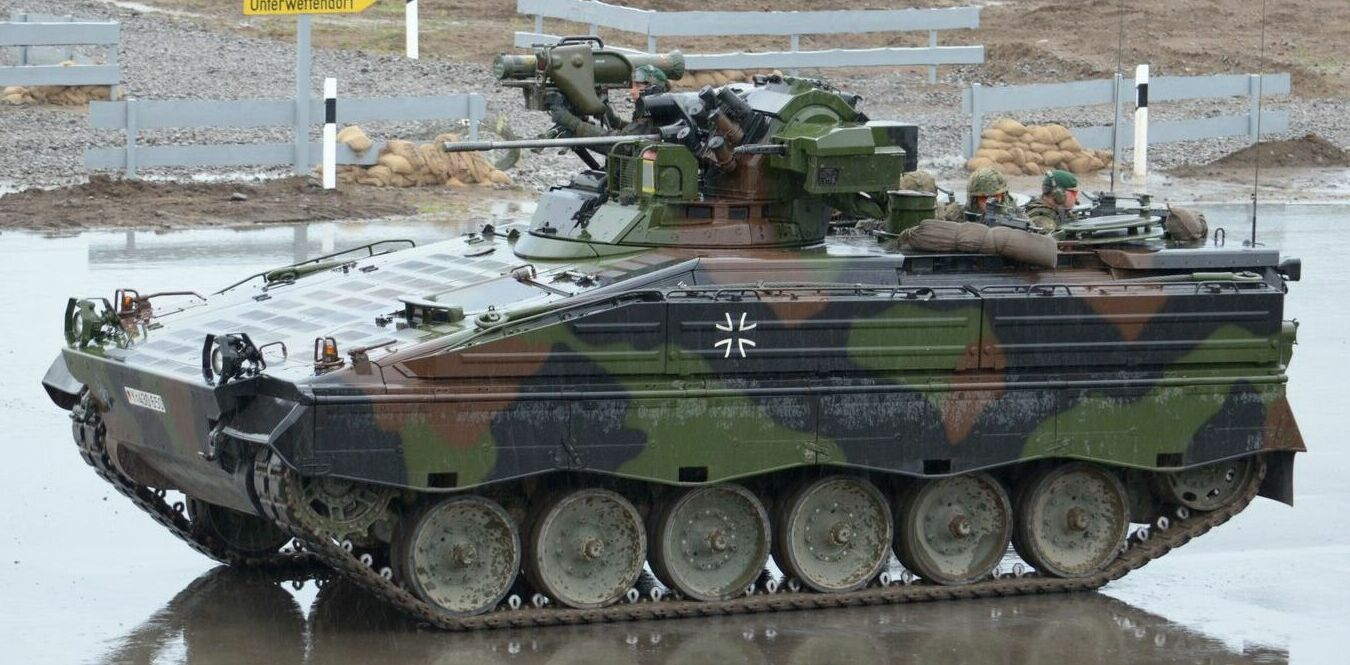
SPz Marder 1

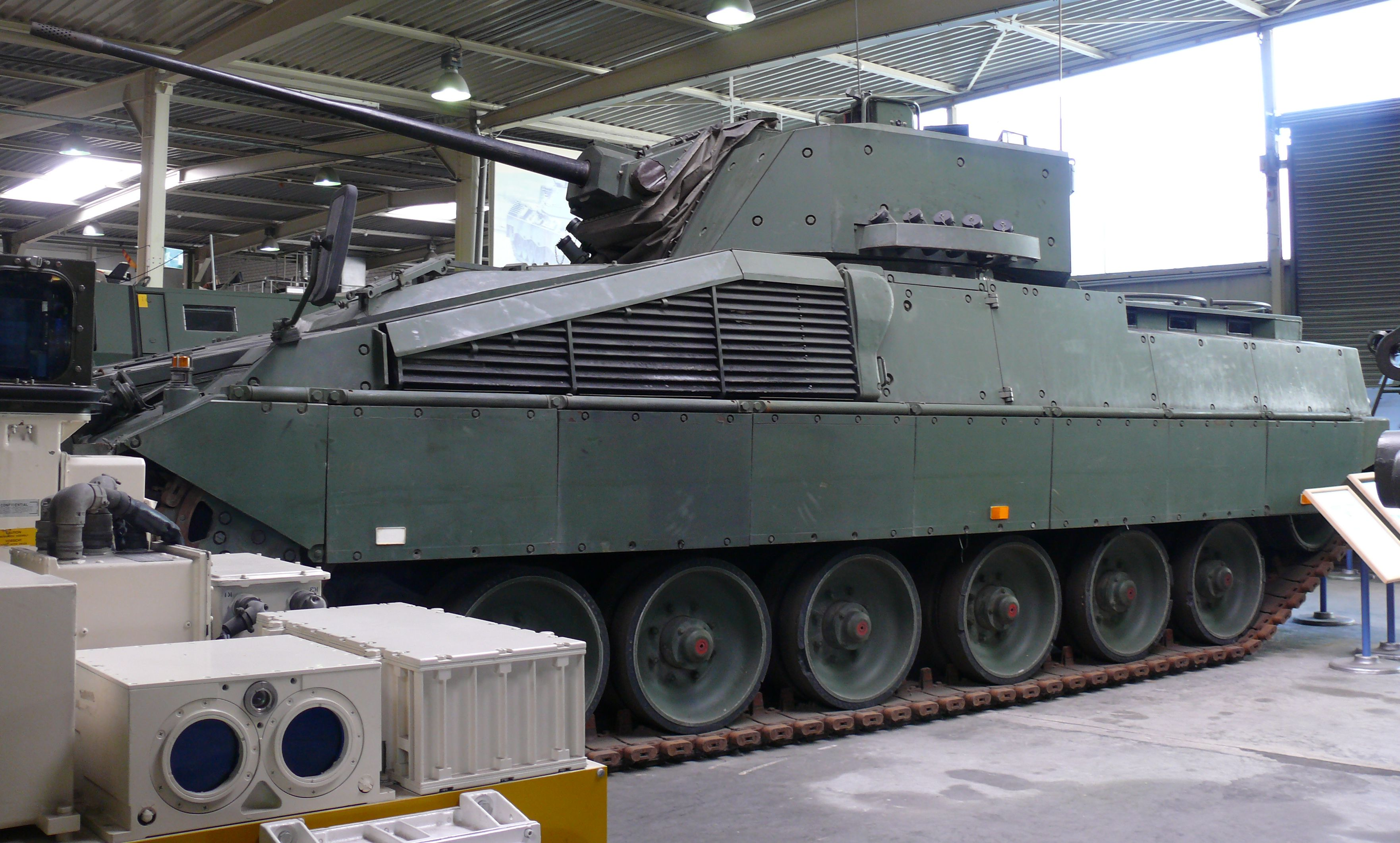
SPz Marder 2

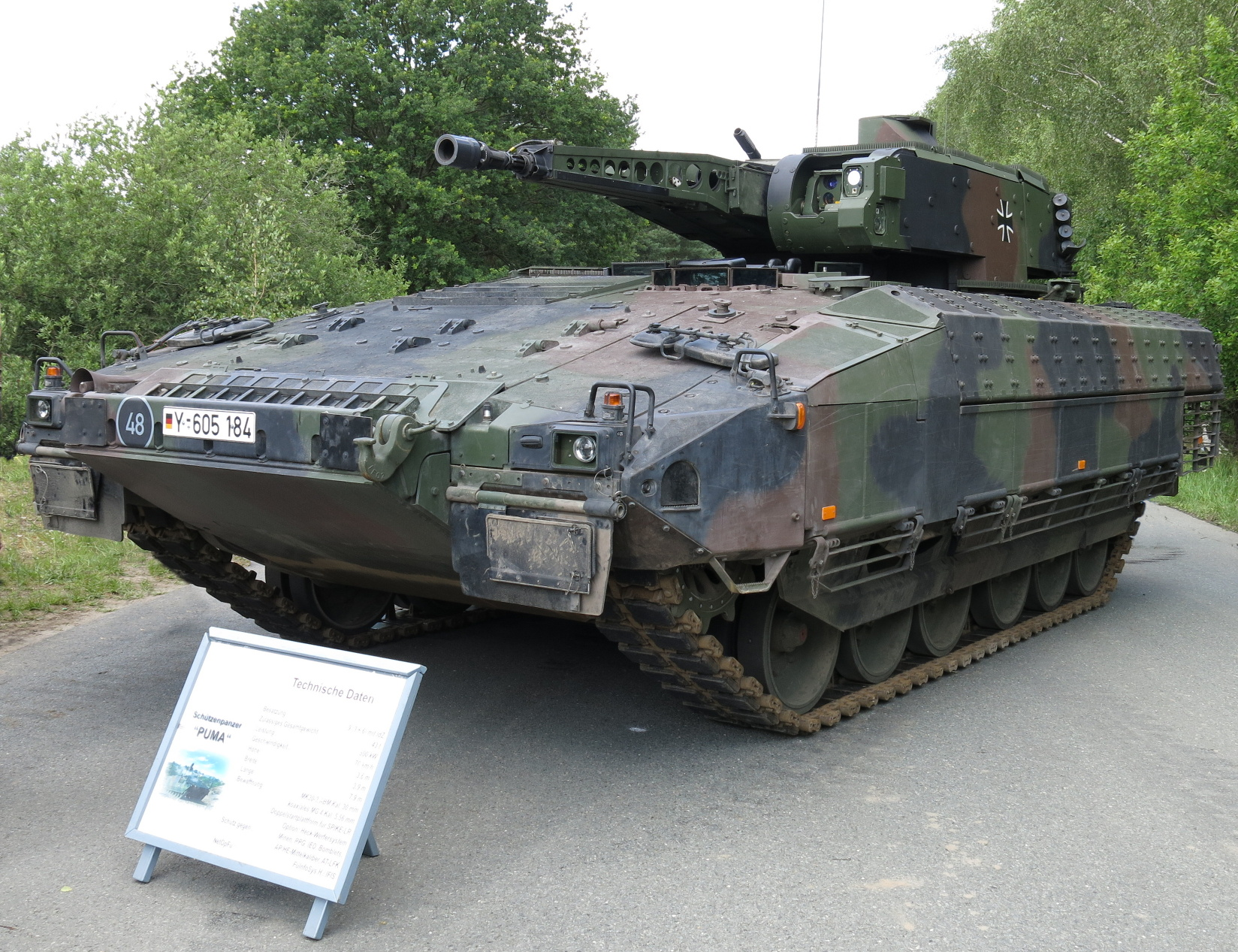
SPz Puma

=== Bundeswehr doctrine ===
In the German army, Panzergrenadiere act as mechanized infantry and escort for tanks and other armoured fighting vehicles.

According to the German central army regulation HDv 100/100 (2000 edition), the Panzergrenadiertruppe and their co-operation with other armoured troops is characterized as following:

The Armoured military forces consist of the Panzertruppe and the Panzergrenadiertruppe. [...] Due to the mobility and protection offered by their armoured fighting vehicles, the Panzergrenadiertruppe is especially suited for swift changes between mounted and dismounted combat to maintain the momentum of armoured troops. [...] The direct and close cooperation of the Panzertruppe and the Panzergrenadiertruppe is, next to the cooperation with Combat support, mandatory to succeed. Their versatility and reactivity enables them to gain and maintain the initiative and bring about the decision.

According to the HDv 231/100, the fighting of a Panzergrenadier Battalion is characterized by the following aspects:

"The fighting of the battalion is characterized by:

- the combination of fire and movement,
- attacking in conjunction with main battle tanks,
- swift changes between mounted and dismounted combat,
- close cooperation between mounted and dismounted forces,
- the particularly mobile combat, [...]"

=== Bundeswehr Panzergrenadier units ===
After the newest phase of the transformation process the German Army will be fielding the following active Panzergrenadier battalions:

- Panzergrenadierbataillon 33, Neustadt am Rübenberge
- Panzergrenadierlehrbataillon 92 (Demonstration battalion), Munster
- Panzergrenadierbataillon 112, Regen
- Panzergrenadierbataillon 122, Oberviechtach
- Panzergrenadierbataillon 212, Augustdorf
- Panzergrenadierbataillon 371, Marienberg
- Panzergrenadierbataillon 391, Bad Salzungen
- Panzergrenadierbataillon 401, Hagenow
- Panzergrenadierbataillon 411, Viereck

Additionally, in 2008 two inactive Panzergrenadier Battalions were formed:

- Panzergrenadierbataillon 908, Viereck (with Panzergrenadierbataillon 411 as supplying and maintaining unit)
- Panzergrenadierbataillon 909, Marienberg (with Panzergrenadierbataillon 371 as supplying and maintaining unit)

Training and development of the Panzergrenadiertruppe is usually performed by the Armoured Corps Training Centre (Ausbildungszentrum Panzertruppen) in Munster, its commander holding the title of General der Panzertruppen. Some essential training courses, especially for urban warfare and fighting in forested terrain, are held at the Ausbildungszentrum Infanterie ("Infantry Training Centre") at Hammelburg.

=== Bundeswehr Panzergrenadier equipment ===
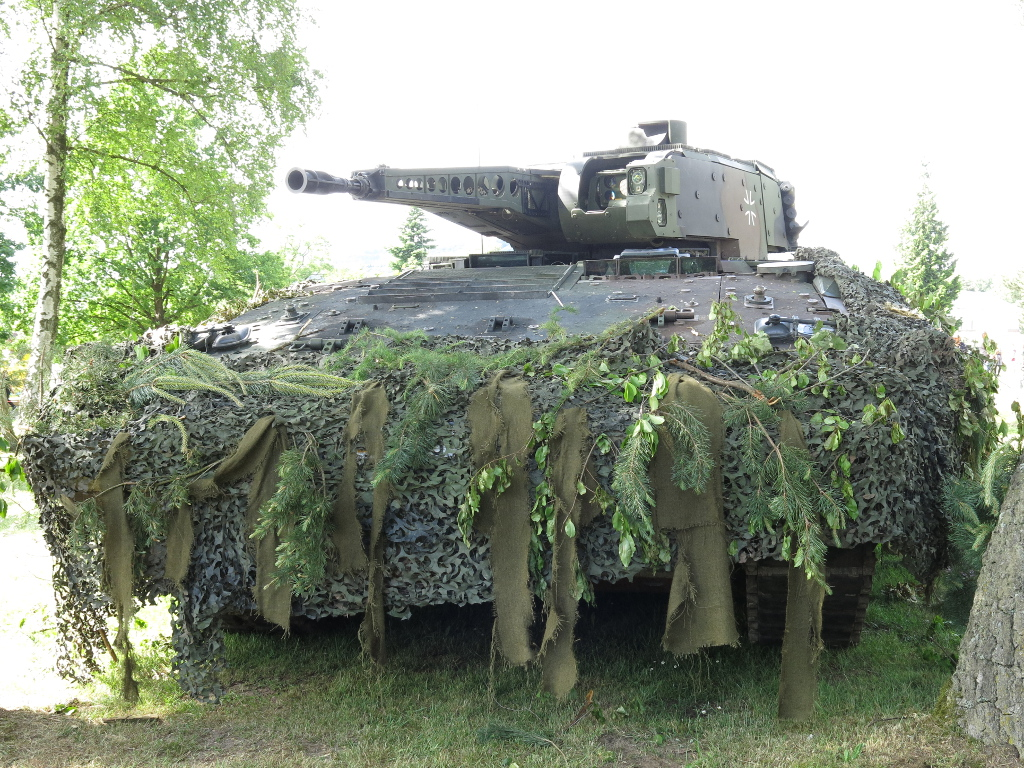
Camouflaged Puma IFV in 2017.

The main weapon system of the German Panzergrenadiers is the Schützenpanzer Puma infantry fighting vehicles. It was introduced beginning in 2010, intended to replace the Schützenpanzer Marder 1 IFV, with equipping to be completed by 2025. Due to the design of the Puma, Panzergrenadiers cannot exceed a height of 1.84 meters.

The G36 assault rifle is the standard weapon of German infantrymen and also used by Panzergrenadier units. Each dismounted fireteam usually also deploys a MG3 machine gun. To fight armored vehicles or other hard targets the Panzerfaust 3 rocket-propelled grenade and the MILAN Anti-tank guided missile are in use. The MILAN-ATGM is used by dismounted Panzergrenadier fireteams (which consist of six soldiers due to the number of soldiers carried by the Marder and Puma IFVs), as well as attached to the Marder turret to provide the IFV with enhanced anti-armour capabilities. In tandem with the replacement of the Marder by the Puma, the MILAN is similarly being replaced by the Spike-ATGM for mounted and dismounted use.

As part of the Future Soldier-program, the German Infanterist der Zukunft program is also intended to be introduced into Panzergrenadier units and is already deployed with German soldiers in Afghanistan.

== Swedish Army ==
The Swedish Army has used infantry in its armored force since 1942, so-called "armour infantry" (Swedish: pansarinfanteri). In 1943 the first Swedish dedicated infantry fighting vehicle was introduced, namely the tgb m/42 KP. Infantry serving with it were called "armour schütze soldiers" (Swedish: pansarskyttesoldater). The tgb m/42 KP was generally a good design for its time but it lacked an armored roof for the troop compartment. Its wheeled design also limited its use alongside tanks when in terrain. By the late 1950s a replacement design was needed. This led to the development of the pbv 301 and 302 IFVs, featuring tracked chassis and enclosed troop compartments. By the 1980s the next generation of Swedish IFV was in development, ultimately resulting in the strf 90 IFV, internationally known as the CV90. For a brief period, Sweden also operated ex East German BMP-1 IFVs from the Soviet Union, under the Swedish designation pbv 501, while waiting for more strf 90s to be produced.

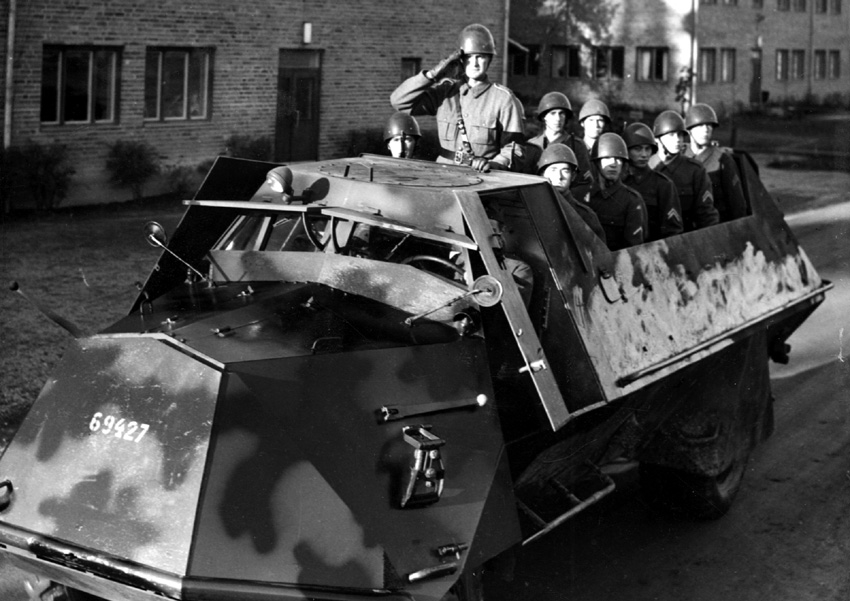
Tgb m/42 KP with mounted infantry

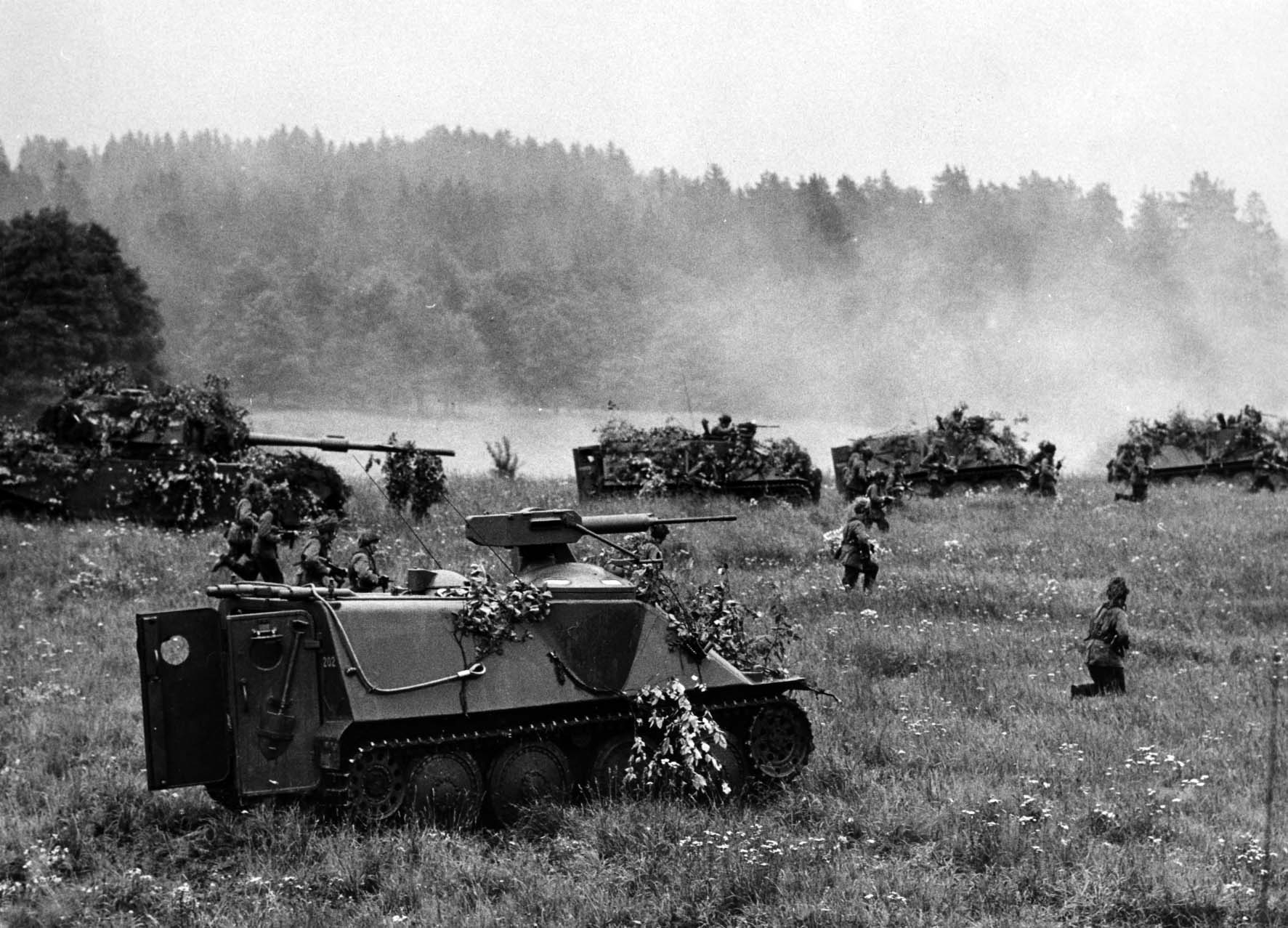
Pbv 301 with dismounted infantry

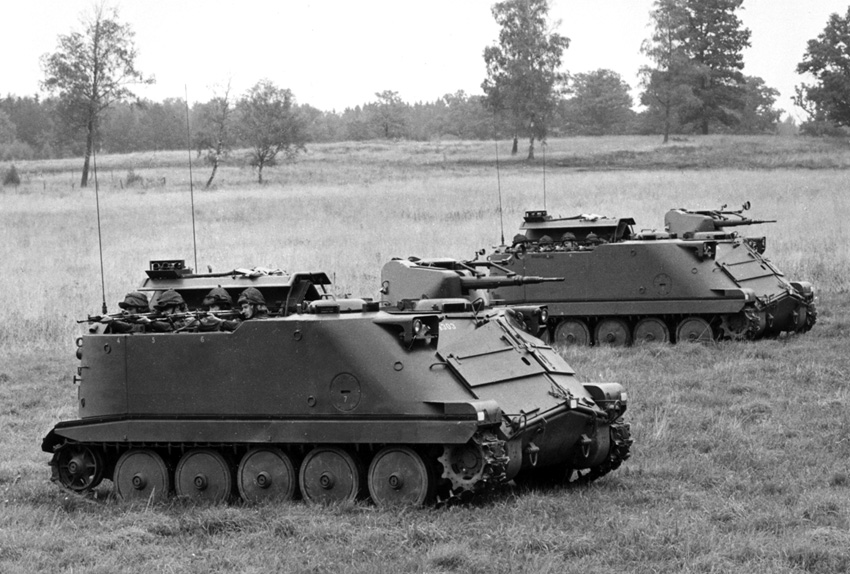
Pbv 302 with mounted infantry

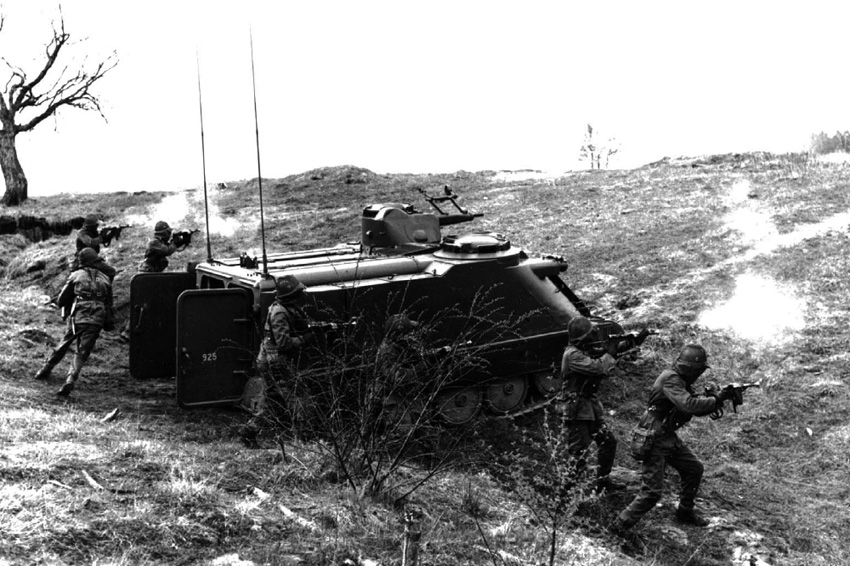
Pbv 302 with dismounted infantry

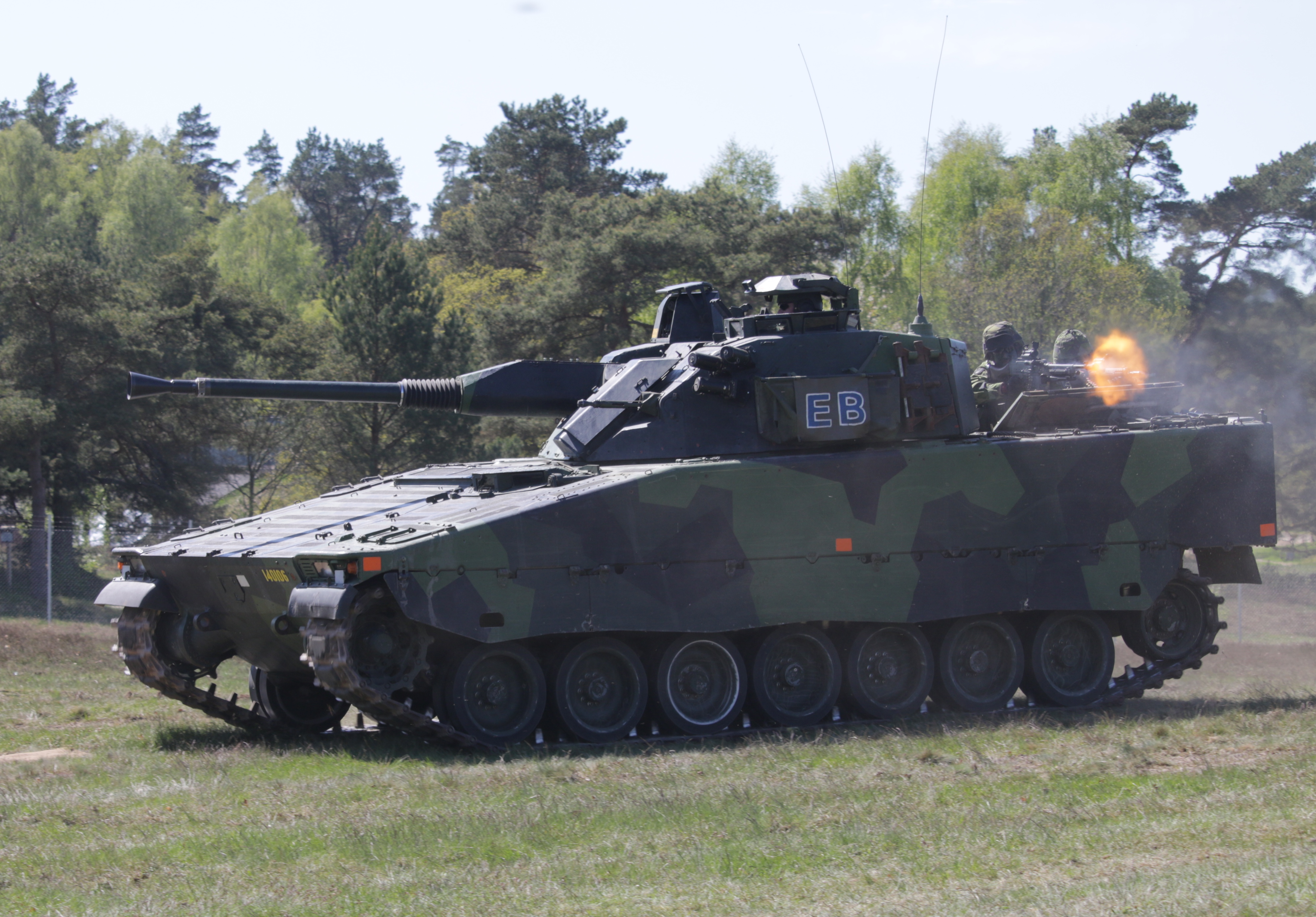
Strf 9040 with mounted infantry

== Swiss Army ==
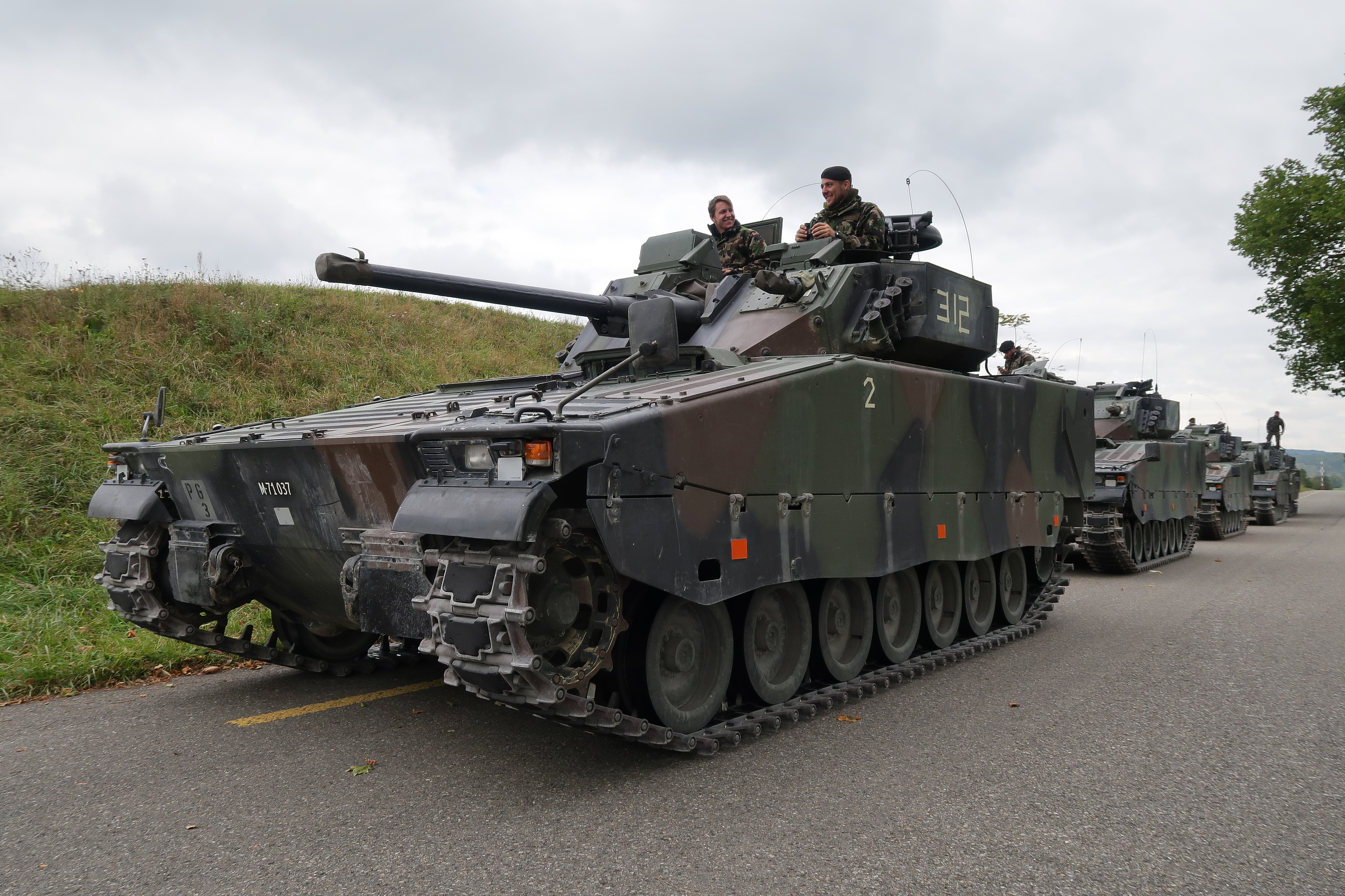
Five Swiss SPz2000 (Combat Vehicle 90) at Frauenfeld Training Area, 2016

Switzerland adopted the M113 armored personnel carrier as an IFV in 1963, designated Schützenpanzer 63. Similar to most World War II IFVs it only carried machine gun armament and relied on the panzergrenadier squad and their armament for effect. The Schützenpanzer 63 was subsequently updated with a 20 mm gun turret from Swedish firm Hägglund & Söner in the 1970s, mounting a modified Hispano-Suiza HS.804 autocannon. The same turret had previously been developed for the similar Swedish IFV pbv 302.

The Schützenpanzer 63 was eventually replaced with the Hägglunds CV9030CH from Sweden in the early 2000s, designated the Schützenpanzer 2000. The Swiss Army purchasing 186 vehicles from Hägglunds. They are in use with Panzergrenadier troops.

== Austrian Bundesheer ==
The two existing Panzergrenadier battalions of the Austrian Bundesheer use the Austrian version of the ASCOD (Austrian Spanish Cooperation Development) armoured fighting vehicle, known as the Schützenpanzer "Ulan". The Waffenfarbe of the Austrian Panzergrenadiers is black.
