= Hispano-Suiza HS.820 =

HS.820
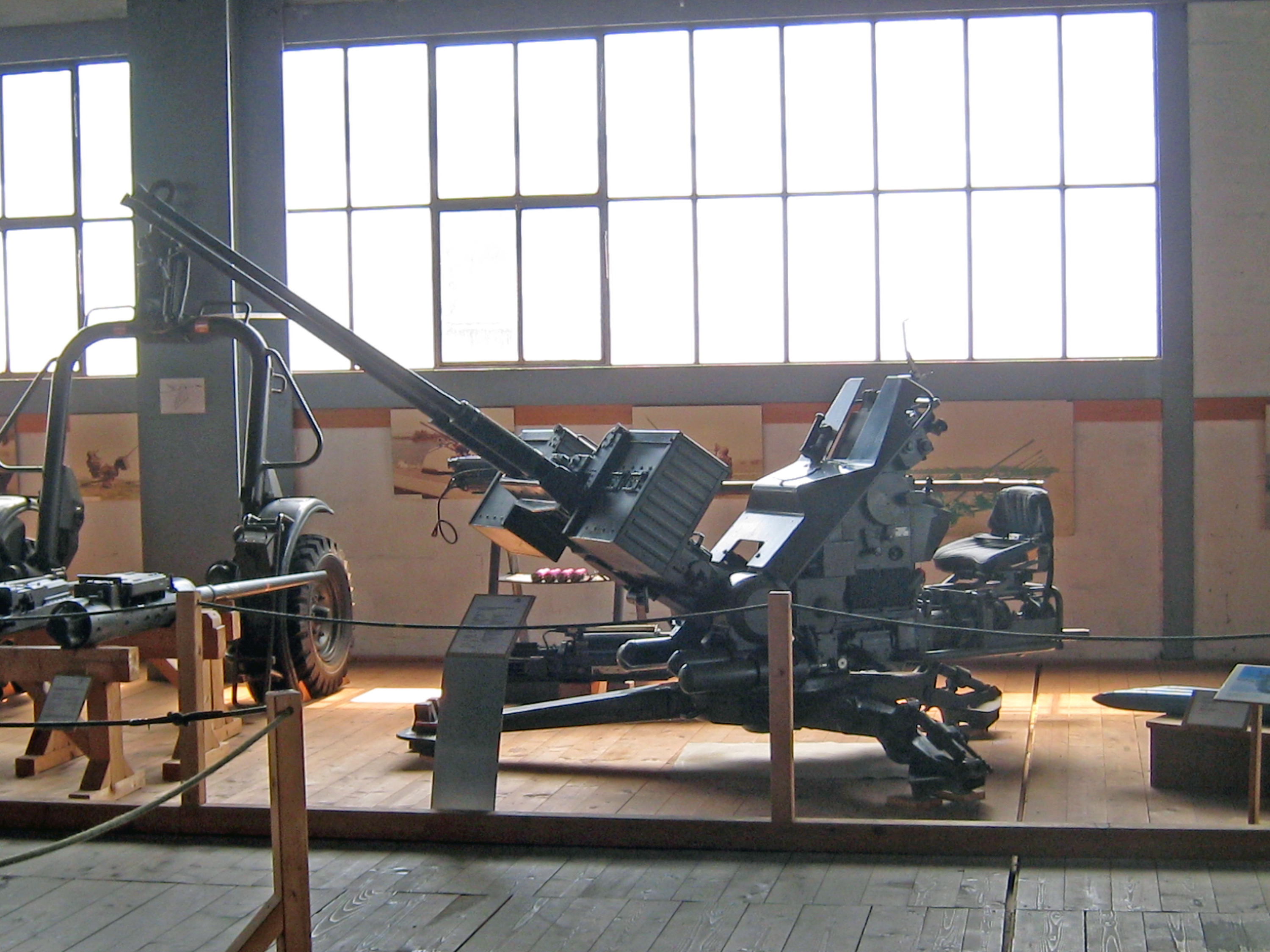
- Swiss HS.820 in the HS.666A configuration.
- Type: Autocannon
- Place of origin: Switzerland

Specifications
- Mass: 66 kg (146 lb) (without ammunition)
- Length: 2,489 mm (98.0 in)
- Barrel length: 1,727 mm (68.0 in)
- Caliber: 20×139 mm
- Action: Gas unlocked, delayed blowback
- Rate of fire: 1000 round/min
- Muzzle velocity: 1,050 m/s (3,400 ft/s)
- Effective firing range: 1,500 m (4,900 ft) against aerial targets

The HS.820 is a 20 mm caliber autocannon developed by Hispano-Suiza primarily for aircraft use, but more widely used in a series of ground-based anti-aircraft guns. After Oerlikon purchased Hispano's armaments division in 1970, the HS.820 became the Oerlikon KAD, supplanting Oerlikon's own KAA and KAB weapons in the process. A US-built model, the M139, was used on the M114A1E1 and M114A2 Armored Command & Reconnaissance Carrier.

== Development ==
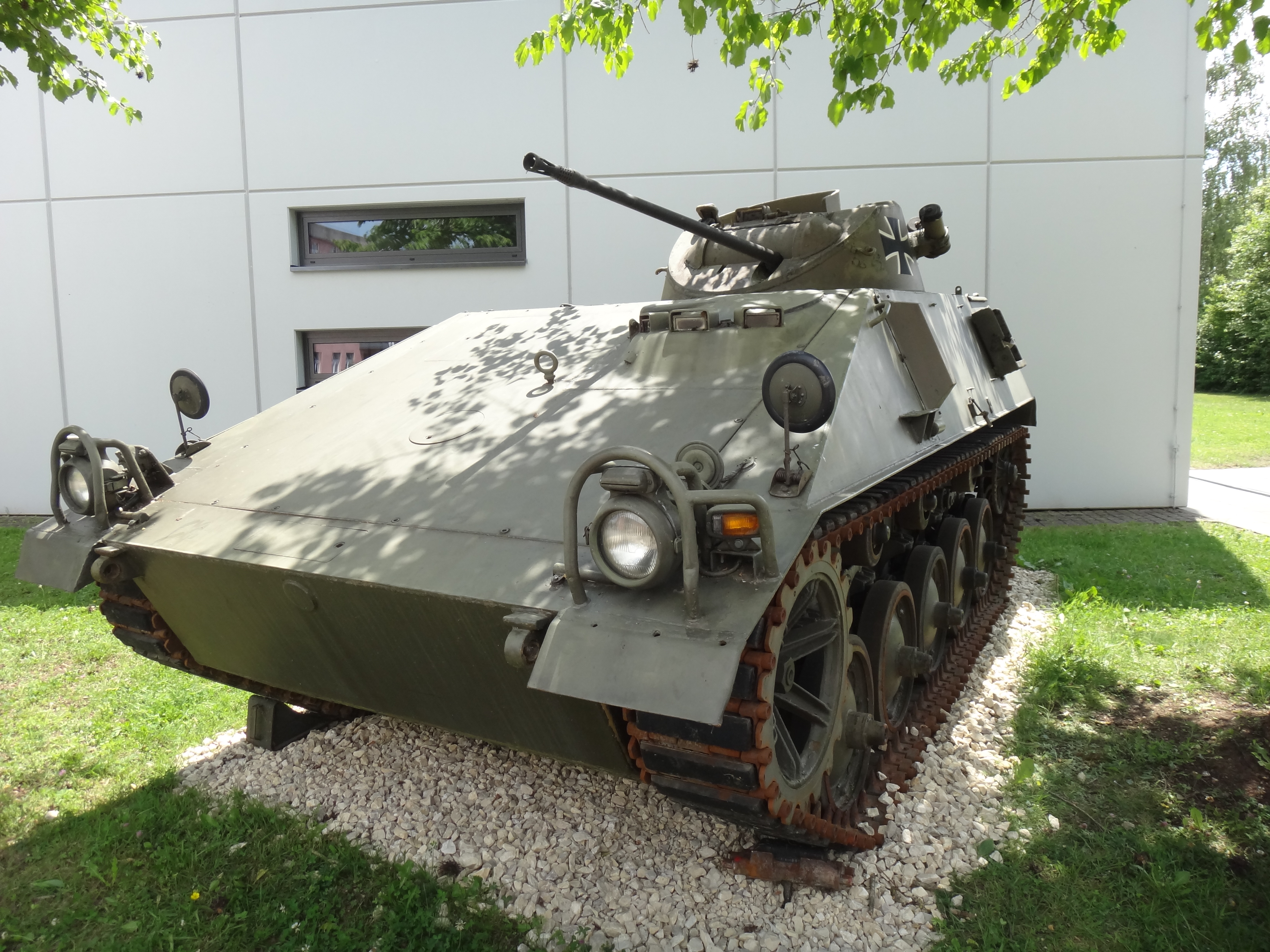
An armored vehicle Schützenpanzer SPz 11-2 Kurz equipped with a gun HS.820

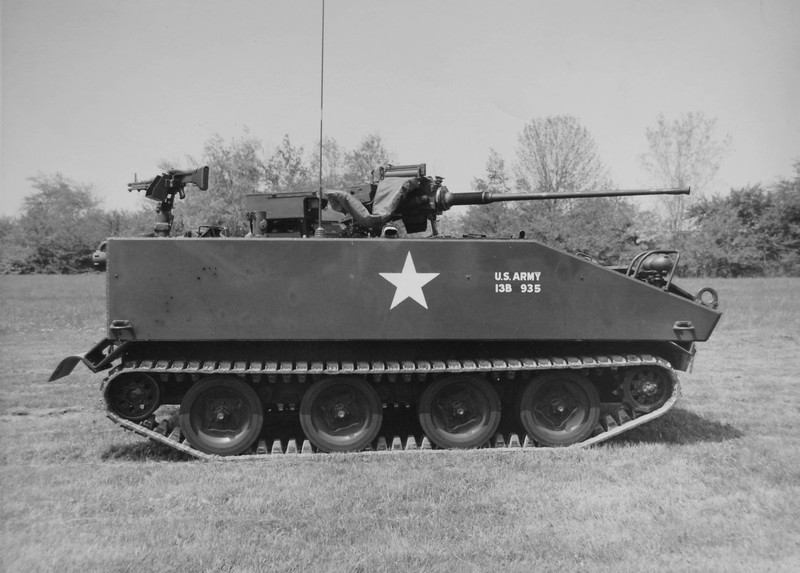
M114A2 with M139 Gun

Developed in the post-World War II era, the HS.820 fires a 20×139 mm round developed from the Swiss 20×139 FMK (and FK 38) as a replacement for their earlier 20×110 mm design of the widely used HS.404. The new round was one of two post-WWII European 20 mm designs, the other being the 20×128 developed by Oerlikon for a similar role. The HS.820's high 1,100 m/s muzzle velocity and equally high 1,000 round per minute firing rate made it a formidable weapon. Nevertheless, the rapid introduction of even higher performance revolver cannons meant the HS.820 was never as popular in an aircraft role as the HS.404 had been.

The weapon was more widely used in a variety of mounts for the anti-aircraft role, especially in naval use. Hispano introduced a number of mountings with a variety of sighting systems, feeds and power traverse. The HS.639-B3 (later known as the GAI-CO1) is a single-gun mounting fed from a 75-round drum, a fairly serious limitation for a gun with such a high rate of fire. Variants included the HS.639-B4 (GAI-CO3) with a 50-round drum mounted on top of the weapon, and the HS.639-B5 (GAI-CO6) that uses dual 75-round magazines for longer firing times. The HS 665 is a triple-mount variety using the same drum feeds. The HS.666A (GAI-DO1), developed in the mid-1970s, features two HS.820 with new 120-round box magazines mounted on a shared hydraulically powered platform which could be tied into an associated radar-guided fire-control system.

After Oerlikon purchased Hispano-Suiza, they undertook a renaming exercise for all of their weapons. The HS.820 was then known as the KAD, meaning Kanone, A for 20 mm (Note: A for 20, B for 23 or 25, C for 30 and D for 35 mm.) and D as the fourth model. Oerlikon's own 20×128 mm became the KAA in the electrically-fired version, and the KAB in the gas-operated version.

The United States produced a slightly modified version of the HS.820 as the M139. It saw use on a number of vehicles, including the US Army's M114 and the Marine Corps amphibious assault vehicle and the ill-fated MICV-65 series of armored vehicles, including on a palletised mount in the cabin of a Bell UH-1 helicopter.

The 20×139 mm round was also widely used in a variety of other weapons, including the Rheinmetall MK 20 Rh 202 and 20 mm modèle F2 gun.

== Original Hispano-Suiza ammunition ==
- UIA (HEI): Projectile weight 120 g, explosive filler 10 g
- RIA (APHEI): Projectile weight 120 g, explosive filler 4.5 g
- RINT (APHC): Projectile weight 111 g, tungsten carbide core weight 70 g

== See also ==
- List of delayed-blowback firearms
- Hispano-Suiza HS.404
- Oerlikon 20 mm cannon
- Oerlikon KCB
- Rheinmetall Mk 20 Rh-202
- Zastava M55
- ZPU
- ZU-23-2
