= List of weapons of West Germany =

This is a list of weapons utilized by the armed forces of West Germany. West Germany was formed as a result of the division of Germany following World War II. Following a 10 year period of demilitarization, the Federal Republic of Germany rearmed and joined NATO in 1955. As a frontline state bordering the Iron Curtain, West Germany's Cold War arsenal drew on both domestically developed weaponry as well as extensive imports from NATO allies, particularly the United States.

== Small arms ==
=== Rifles ===
- FN FAL- Adopted in 1956 following the beginning of West Germany's rearmament in 1955 and designated G1. Replaced by the G3 beginning in 1959.
- Heckler & Koch G3- West Germany's primary service rifle from its entry into service in 1959 until its replacement in the 1990s.

=== Sniper rifles ===
- G3SG/1 - Developed in 1972 and based on the G3 battle rifle, this served as Germany's primary sniper rifle. Replaced by the MSG90 beginning in 1990.

=== Sidearms ===
- Walther P38- Reintroduced from WWII in 1957 and saw service until 1963. Replaced by the P1, an improved variant that served as the West Germany's standard-issue sidearm for the remainder of the Cold War.

=== Submachine guns ===
- Walther MP - Developed in 1963. Largely outclassed and replaced by the MP5.
- Heckler & Koch MP5 - Developed in 1966, this would go on to serve as West Germany's primary submachine gun.

=== Machine guns ===
- Rheinmetall MG 3- Modernized variant of the WWII-era MG 42. Served as West Germany's primary general-purpose machine gun from the late 1950s onward.
- Heckler & Koch HK21 - A general-purpose machine gun developed in 1961 based on the G3 battle rifle.

=== Grenade launchers ===
- Heckler & Koch HK69A1 - A 40 mm standalone grenade launcher created in 1979 and adopted into service with the German Army in the 1980s.

=== Anti-tank weapons ===
- PzF 44
- MILAN

== Artillery ==
=== Towed ===
- M114 155 mm howitzer
- FH70

=== Self-propelled ===
- M7 Priest - M7B2 variant.
- M44 self-propelled howitzer
- M52 self-propelled howitzer
- M55 self-propelled howitzer
- M107 self-propelled gun
- M109 self-propelled howitzer
- M110 self-propelled howitzer

=== Self-propelled rocket artillery ===
- Light Artillery Rocket System

== Anti-aircraft ==
=== Self-propelled anti-aircraft guns ===
- M16 multiple gun motor carriage - M16A1 variant.
- M42 Duster
- Flakpanzer Gepard

=== Surface-to-air missile (SAM) systems ===
- MIM-23 HAWK
- Roland

== Armored fighting vehicles (AFVs) ==
=== Main battle tanks ===
- M47 Patton
- M48 Patton
- Leopard 1
- Leopard 2

=== Light tanks ===
- M41 Walker Bulldog

=== Tank destroyers ===
- Kanonenjagdpanzer
- Raketenjagdpanzer 1
- Raketenjagdpanzer 2
- Jaguar 1
- Jaguar 2

=== Infantry fighting vehicles (IFVs) ===
- Schützenpanzer SPz 11-2 Kurz
- Schützenpanzer Lang HS.30
- Marder (IFV)

=== Armored personnel carriers (APCs) ===
- M113
- Transportpanzer Fuchs

=== Armored weapons carriers (AWCs) ===
- Wiesel AWC

=== Reconnaissance vehicles ===
- Spähpanzer Luchs
