= Jagdpanzer =

German armoured self-propelled anti-tank gun designation

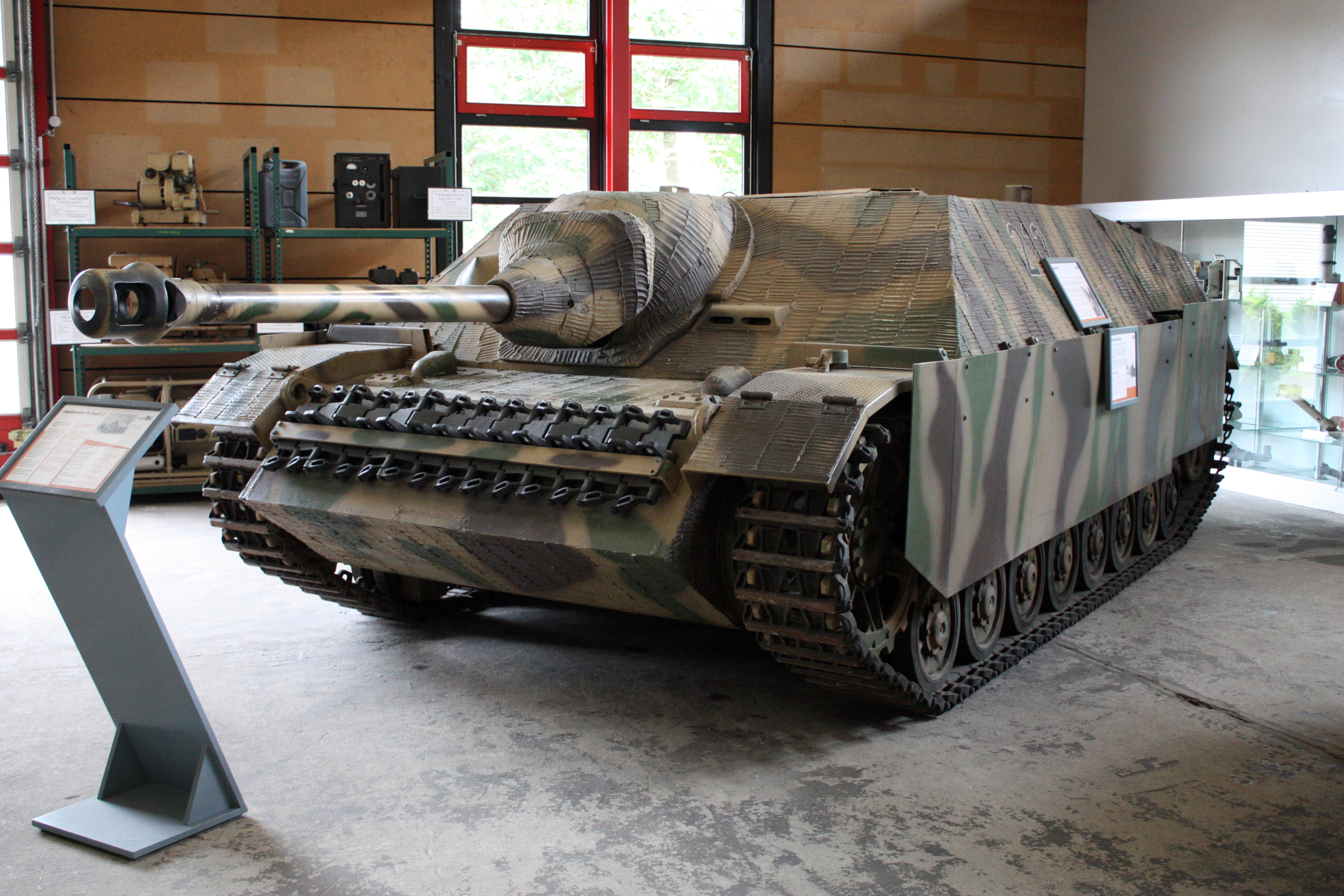
Jagdpanzer IV at the Deutsches Panzermuseum

Jagdpanzer ("tank destroyer") (JgPz) is the name given in German to an armored, tracked tank destroyer, although it may also be used for other kinds of self-propelled guns.

It typically refers to anti-tank variants of existing tank chassis with an armored casemate superstructure that mount an anti-tank gun with limited traverse in the front. These vehicles were classified by the western Allies of World War II as a tank destroyer.

== History ==
The Jagdpanzer designs followed on from the more lightly armored Panzerjäger ("tank hunter") designs, which took an anti-tank gun and mounted it on top of a tank chassis with supplementary armor fitted around the gun crew. However, the armor typically had an open rear and top, almost never providing the crew with full protection from the elements. In addition, much experience was gained from the Sturmgeschütz series of assault guns for infantry support, which already used heavily armored casemates, completely enclosing the vehicle's crew. Although they were associated with artillery and infantry support, they were often used in the anti-tank role.

== Tactical use ==
On the battlefield when the Germans had to retreat, their line of retreat would preferably pass the location of their anti-tank units, who would use their superior firepower to stop the enemy, perhaps even open the possibility of a counter-attack. Due to the lack of a turret and the armor being concentrated at the front, the ideal combat situation for Jagdpanzer units was in the planned ambush, and the skill of the commander of such units lay in correctly choosing and preparing such places long before needed.

== Types ==
The list below comprises some of the Jagdpanzer-type tank destroyers made by Germany.

Name	Production start	Country of origin	Quantity
Elefant/Ferdinand, officially 'Panzerjäger Tiger (P)'	March 1943	Nazi Germany	91
Mareșal	July 1943	Kingdom of Romania	6–17
Jagdpanther	January 1944	Nazi Germany	415
Jagdpanzer IV	December 1943	Nazi Germany	2,000
Jagdtiger	February 1944	Nazi Germany	70–88
Jagdpanzer 38(t) (Note: Post-war popularly named "Hetzer")	March 1944	Nazi Germany Protectorate of Bohemia and Moravia	2,827

== Post-war usage ==
After the war, the name Jagdpanzer was kept in use in the Bundeswehr for a number of armored vehicles used for anti-tank duties. This included the Kanonenjagdpanzer, a casemate vehicle intended for infantry support. and the Raketenjagdpanzer series. The first Raketenjagdpanzer was the Raketenjagdpanzer 1 built on the chassis of the SPz Lang HS.30 and armed with SS.11 missiles. The Raketenjagdpanzer 2 was built on the same chassis as the Kanonenjagdpanzer, but was equipped with two SS.11 launch-rails instead of carrying a gun.

Later, the Raketenjagdpanzer 2 and the Kanonenjagdpanzer were upgraded to Jaguar 1 and Jaguar 2 tank destroyers, armed with HOT or TOW missiles.

== See also ==
- Tank destroyer
- Assault gun
- Type 3 Ho-Ni III – (Empire of Japan)
- Type 5 Ho-Ru – (Empire of Japan)
- 44M Zrinyi I – (Hungary)
- Semovente da 75/46 – (Italy)
