= Panzerjäger =

Branch of service of the German Wehrmacht during the Second World War

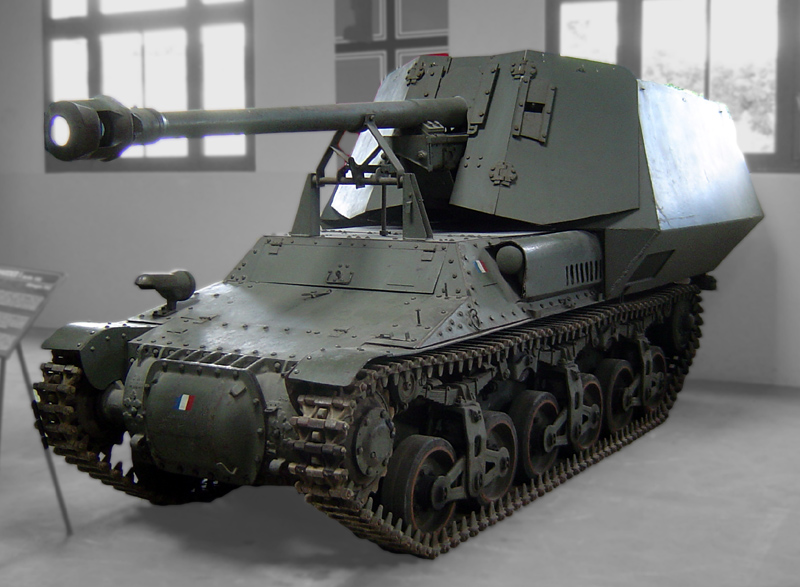
Panzerjäger Marder I

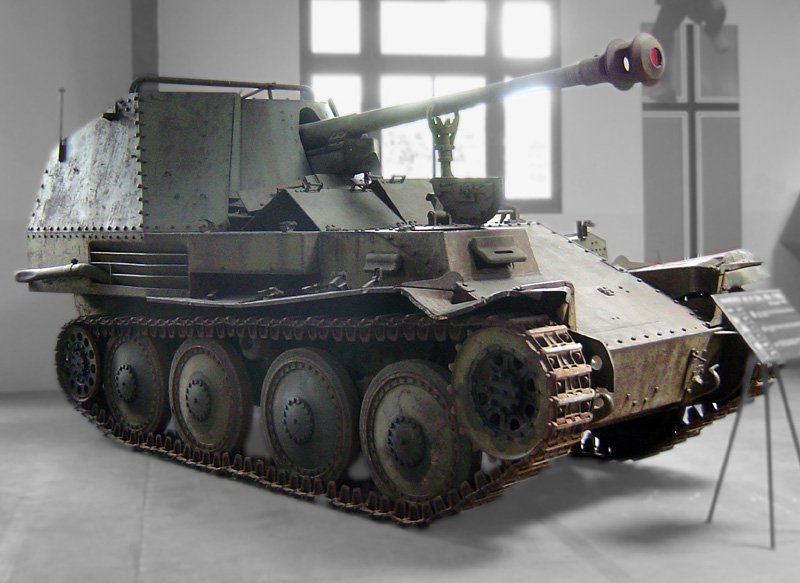
Panzerjäger Marder III

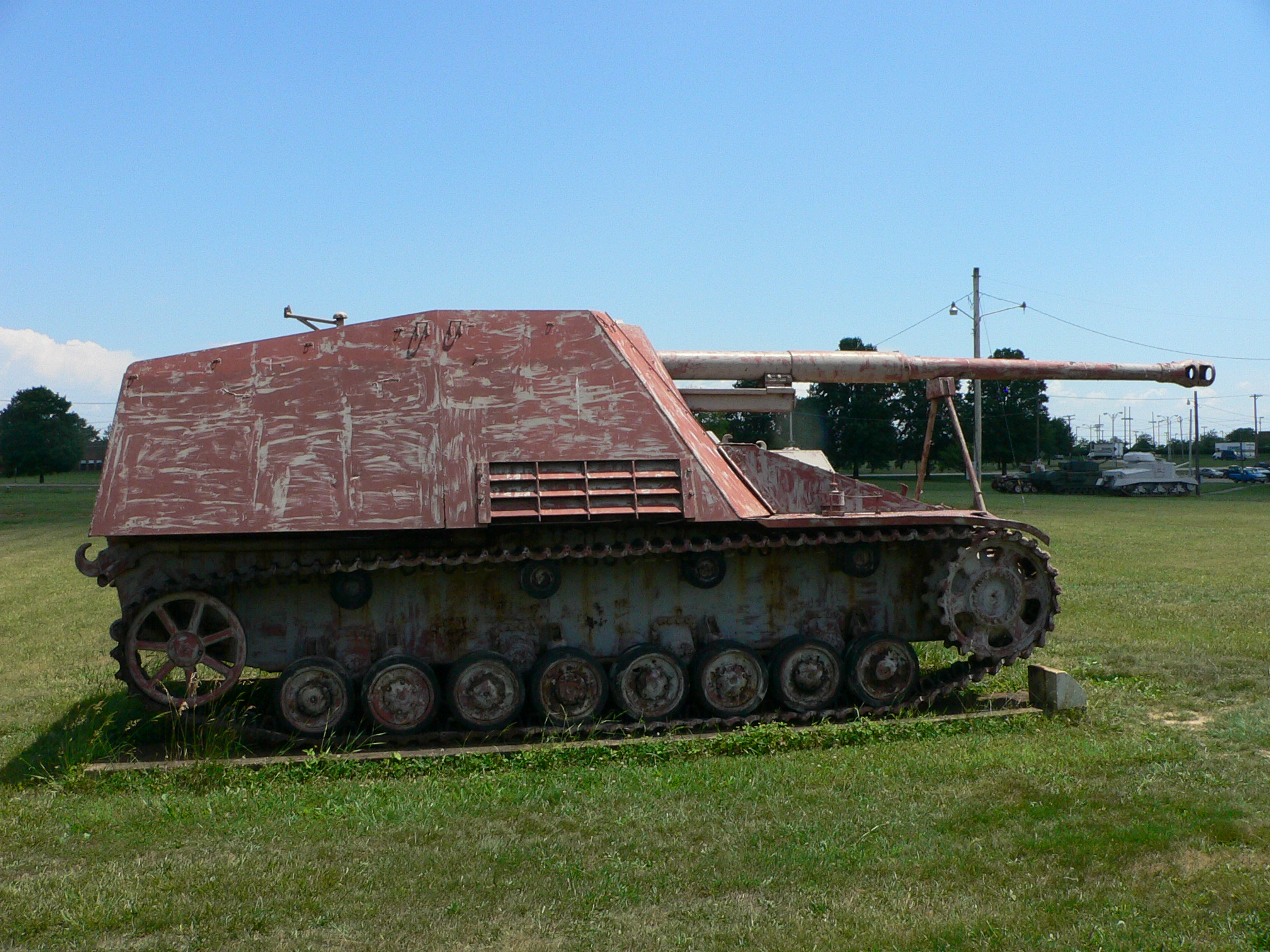
Nashorn mounted an 88 mm anti-tank gun on a chassis derived from the German medium tanks

Panzerjäger (German: literally "armor hunter", more broadly "anti-tank") is a term used for an anti-tank vehicle (self-propelled anti-tank gun), as well as anti-tank units. The term was first used in the Wehrmacht (German armed forces, 1935–45), and also post-war by the German Federal Republic Bundeswehr. The term Panzerjäger was used in the Bundeswehr as a designation of rank.

== Wehrmacht ==
=== Development ===
From 1940, the Panzerjäger troops were equipped with vehicles produced by mounting an existing anti-tank gun complete with the gun shield on a tracked chassis to allow higher mobility.

The development of Panzerjägers into the fully protected Jagdpanzer armored vehicle designs began before the war with the Sturmgeschütz-designated armored artillery vehicles, the initial German turretless assault guns to use completely closed-in armored casemates, and continued until 1944, resulting in the fully enclosed Jagdpanzer "hunting tanks", purpose-built heavy-gun tank destroyers. These usually used upward extensions of both the glacis plate and hull sides to comprise three sides of their closed-in casemates. Panzerjäger continued to serve as a separate branch of the Heer until the end of the war, often replacing tanks due to production shortages.

Initially, the chassis of captured light tanks were used after turrets were removed, providing a cost-effective solution to the German shortage of mobile anti-tank weapons in infantry divisions. Despite the shortcomings of light armour and high silhouette, they were successfully used in their intended role of a self-propelled anti-tank gun. Neither anti-tank guns nor Panzerjägers had any real armor to speak of, and while the Panzerjäger had a higher silhouette and was more visible than an anti-tank gun, it was also much more mobile, and was able to relocate or retreat far more rapidly than conventional anti-tank gun crews. The lack of armor meant little until the self-propelled guns began to take on more and more of the offensive duties of tanks as the war progressed and production lagged.

=== Organisation ===
From 1943, the Type 44 infantry divisions included a divisional Panzerjäger-Abteilung ('tank hunter battalion') which was formed of:

- Staff company (Stabskompanie)
- 1. Panzerjäger-Kompanie equipped with 9-12 towed anti-tank guns
- 2. Sturmgeschütz-Batterie equipped with ten StuG III, StuG IV or Hetzer (Jadgpanzer 38) vehicles
- 3. Light anti-aircraft company (leichte FlaK-Kompanie) equipped with 12 towed 20 mm FlaK autocannon

=== Combat use ===
Panzerjäger units were either assigned as the 14th companies in infantry regiments, or as a whole Abteilung (battalion) within Panzer and Panzergrenadier divisions, in both the Waffen-SS and the Heer, (the regular army). Independent battalions and regiments were used by corps to protect the most likely avenues of tank attacks, while divisions would often position their Panzerjäger on the flanks, or use them to support infantry advances against an enemy using tanks. When used with tanks, despite intense inter-branch rivalry, Panzerjäger would work in teams, with the tank crews enticing enemy tanks to fire, disclosing their position, and Panzerjäger engaging the enemy from a defilade. Panzerjäger were often called upon to provide direct high explosive supporting fire to infantry by destroying machine gun and artillery positions, particularly in urban fighting.

=== Vehicle designs ===
Designs of the Panzerjäger vehicles varied based on the chassis used, which could be of three types:

- Early war open-topped superstructure on a light tank chassis
- Mid-war fully enclosed crew compartment on a medium or heavy tank chassis, as an added-on entity not usually integral to the original hull armor
- Late war unarmoured or shielded mounting on a half-track chassis

Panzerjäger designs that entered service included:

- Panzerjäger I – Czech 4,7cm KPÚV vz. 38 (47 mm PaK) on Panzer I chassis.
- 4,7 cm Pak (t) auf Panzerjäger Renault R35(f) - 47 mm Pak on Renault R35
- Marder I – 75 mm PaK 40 on captured French chassis, the Lorraine 37L.
- Marder II – 75 mm PaK 40 or 7.62 cm Pak 36(r) (a reused Soviet 76.2 mm gun) on Panzer II light tank chassis.
- Marder III – 75 mm PaK 40 or 7.62 cm Pak 36(r) on Czech-built Panzer 38(t) chassis.
- 10.5 cm K gepanzerte Selbstfahrlafette "Dicker Max" – two prototype as self-propelled bunker buster on Panzer IV chassis tested as anti-tank weapon.
- Sturer Emil – 12.8 cm Selbstfahrlafette auf VK 30.01(H), reuse of two prototype heavy tank chassis as experimental self-propelled gun.
- Hornisse, later renamed Nashorn – 88 mm PaK 43 on composite Panzer III/Panzer IV chassis.
- Ferdinand, later renamed Elefant – the last Panzerjäger vehicle so designated, incorporating a fully enclosed, casemate added to VK 45.01 (P) hulls from the rejected Tiger I chassis design.

The later Jagdpanzer designation was used from the beginning for the following more integrally armored vehicles:

- Jagdpanzer 38(t) (also known as 'Hetzer')
- Jagdpanther
- Jagdpanzer IV
- Jagdtiger

== Bundeswehr ==
In the Bundeswehr of West Germany and subsequently the reunified Federal Republic, the Panzerjägers were reintroduced as a separate arm of the German Army. The Panzerjägertruppe existed from 1956 until 2006 when it was incorporated into the Panzer branch of the army. Among its notable systems of armament were the Jaguar 1, Jaguar 2, Kanonenjagdpanzer, Raketenjagdpanzer 1, Raketenjagdpanzer 2 and the Kampfpanzer M48A2GA2 (a 105 mm gun armed variant of the M48 Patton tank. Soldiers in the lowest rank in the Panzerjägertruppe carried the term Panzerjäger as a title of their rank.

== See also ==
- Archer - a British self-propelled anti-tank gun.
- M56 Scorpion - a US self-propelled gun
