= Jagdpanzer MOWAG Cheetah =

MOWAG Cheetah / Gepard Jagdpanzer
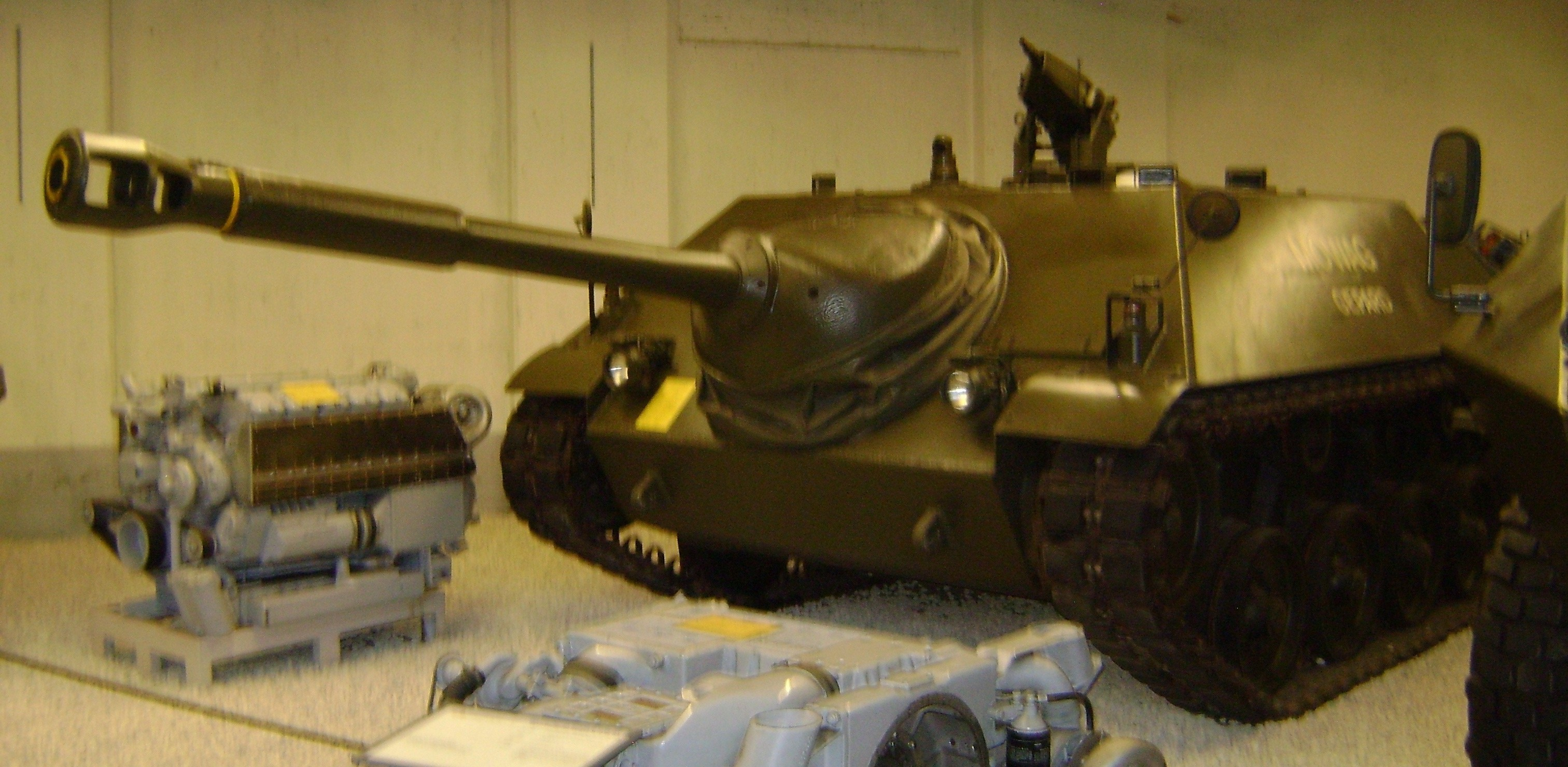
- MOWAG Cheetah at Military Museum Full
- Type: Self-propelled anti-tank gun
- Place of origin: Switzerland

Production history
- Designer: MOWAG Motor Car Factory, Kreuzlingen, Switzerland
- Manufacturer: MOWAG
- Produced: 1960
- No. built: 1
- Variants: Tank destroyer

Specifications
- Mass: 24,800 kg (54,700 lb)
- Crew: 4: driver, commander, gunner, loader
- Main armament: 90 mm anti-tank gun (105 mm optional)
- Secondary armament: 7.62 MG3 in MOWAG apex mount
- Engine: MOWAG M 10 DV 13500 TLK displacement cm ³ 405 kW
- Transmission: MOWAG Mechanical-hydraulic 6 forward 2 Backwartsgear
- Suspension: torsion bar
- Fuel capacity: 400 L (106 US gal; 88 imp gal)
- Operational range: 500 km (310 mi)
- Maximum speed: 70 km/h (43 mph)

The Jagdpanzer MOWAG Cheetah is a Jagdpanzer (tank hunter) made by Mowag in Switzerland.

== History and development ==
In 1960, the West German Bundeswehr started a development project with the purpose of creating a new casemate tank destroyer armed with the 90mm anti-tank gun from their obsolete M47 Patton tanks. Three different proposals were offered by the companies Henschel, Hanomag and Mowag. Each company completed a single prototype for a comparison test. The Bundeswehr eventually chose the Hanomag prototype and put it into production as the Kanonenjagdpanzer. Built in early 1960, the MOWAG Cheetah has air conditioning, NBC protection, and an automatic fire detection and extinguishing system in the engine compartment. The only prototype is now in the Military Museum Full.
