= Raketenjagdpanzer =

Raketenjagdpanzer (missile armed tank hunter) is the designation of a range of German dedicated tank destroyers equipped with anti-tank guided missiles. Four different Raketenjagdpanzer have been used so far:

- Raketenjagdpanzer 1
- Raketenjagdpanzer 2
- Raketenjagdpanzer 3 Jaguar 1
- Raketenjagdpanzer 4 Jaguar 2

An infantry fighting vehicle with ATGMs for a secondary anti-tank role like a Marder with a MILAN-launcher is not considered a Raketenjagdpanzer.
