= Jaguar 2 =

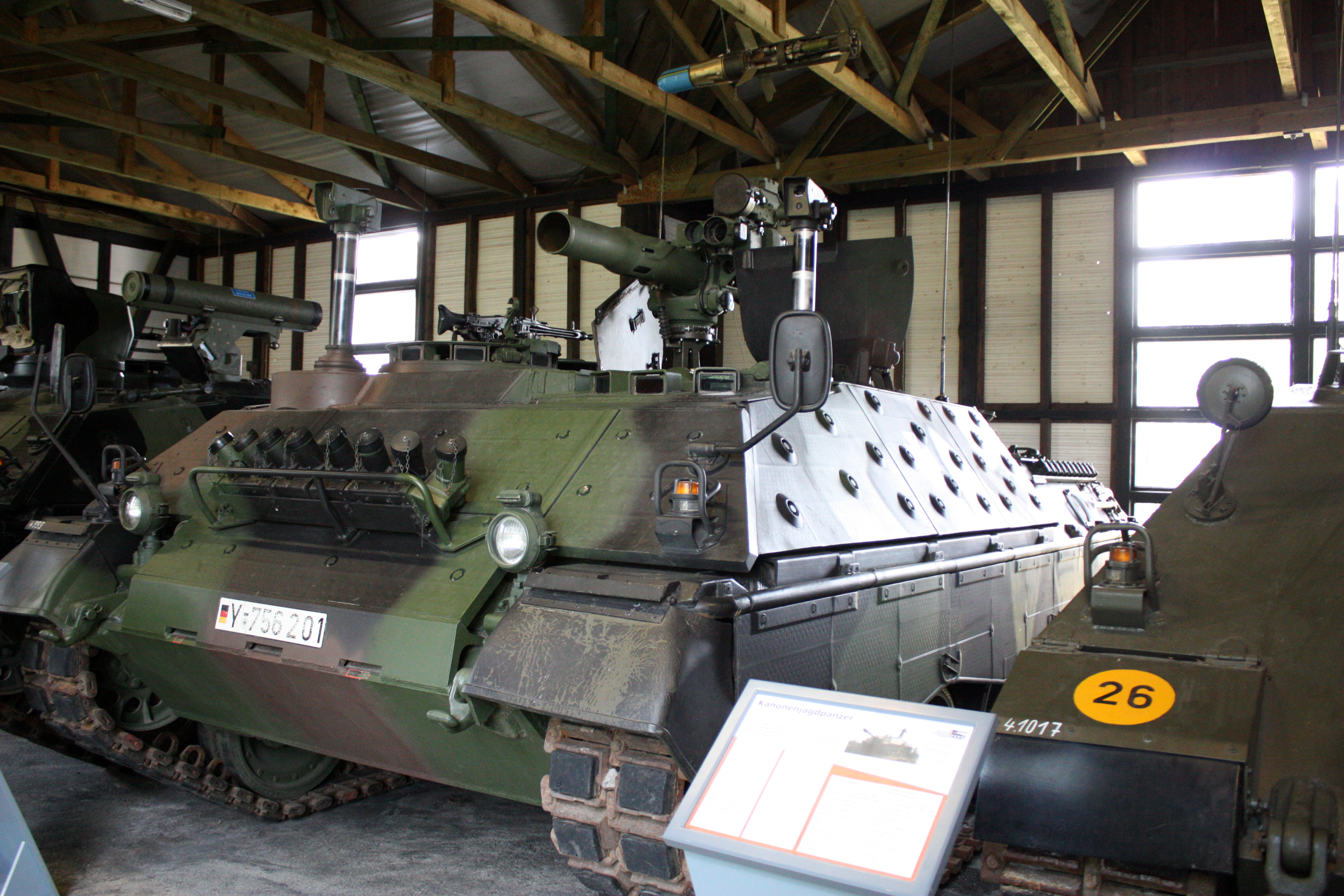
- Type: Anti-tank missile carrier
- Place of origin: West Germany

Service history
- In service: 1983–1993
- Used by: West Germany

Production history
- Manufacturer: Henschel and Hanomag
- Produced: 1983–1985
- No. built: 162

Specifications
- Mass: 24.8 tons
- Length: 6.61 m
- Width: 3.12 m
- Height: 2.55 m
- Crew: 4 (commander, gunner, loader, driver)
- Armor: 50 mm steel + applique armour
- Main armament: 1× TOW missile launcher
- Secondary armament: 1× 7.62mm MG3 machine gun 8× smoke dischargers
- Engine: 29,4 liter MTU MB 837 Aa V8 water-cooled multi-fuel diesel-engine 500 hp (368 kW)
- Suspension: torsion bar
- Operational range: 400 km
- Maximum speed: 70 km/h

The Raketenjagdpanzer 4 Jaguar 2 was a West German tank destroyer equipped with anti-tank guided missiles. It was only operated by the Bundeswehr.

== History ==
From 1983 to 1985, 162 Kanonenjagdpanzers were converted to Raketenjagdpanzer 4 Jaguar 2. This was done by removing the main gun, adding a TOW launcher on the roof and adding applique armour. In 1989, the TOW missiles were replaced by the more potent TOW 2. In 1993, the Jaguar 2 tank destroyers were phased out in favour of the Jaguar 1A3, an upgraded version of the Jaguar 1.

== Design ==
The Jaguar 2 is a tank destroyer that follows the traditional casemate design of West German tank destroyers. It is a rather light vehicle based on the "leichte Fahrzeugfamilie"-chassis, which was also used by the SPz Marder and the Jaguar 1. It is an all-welded steel construction, which has maximum thickness of 50 mm.

=== Protection ===
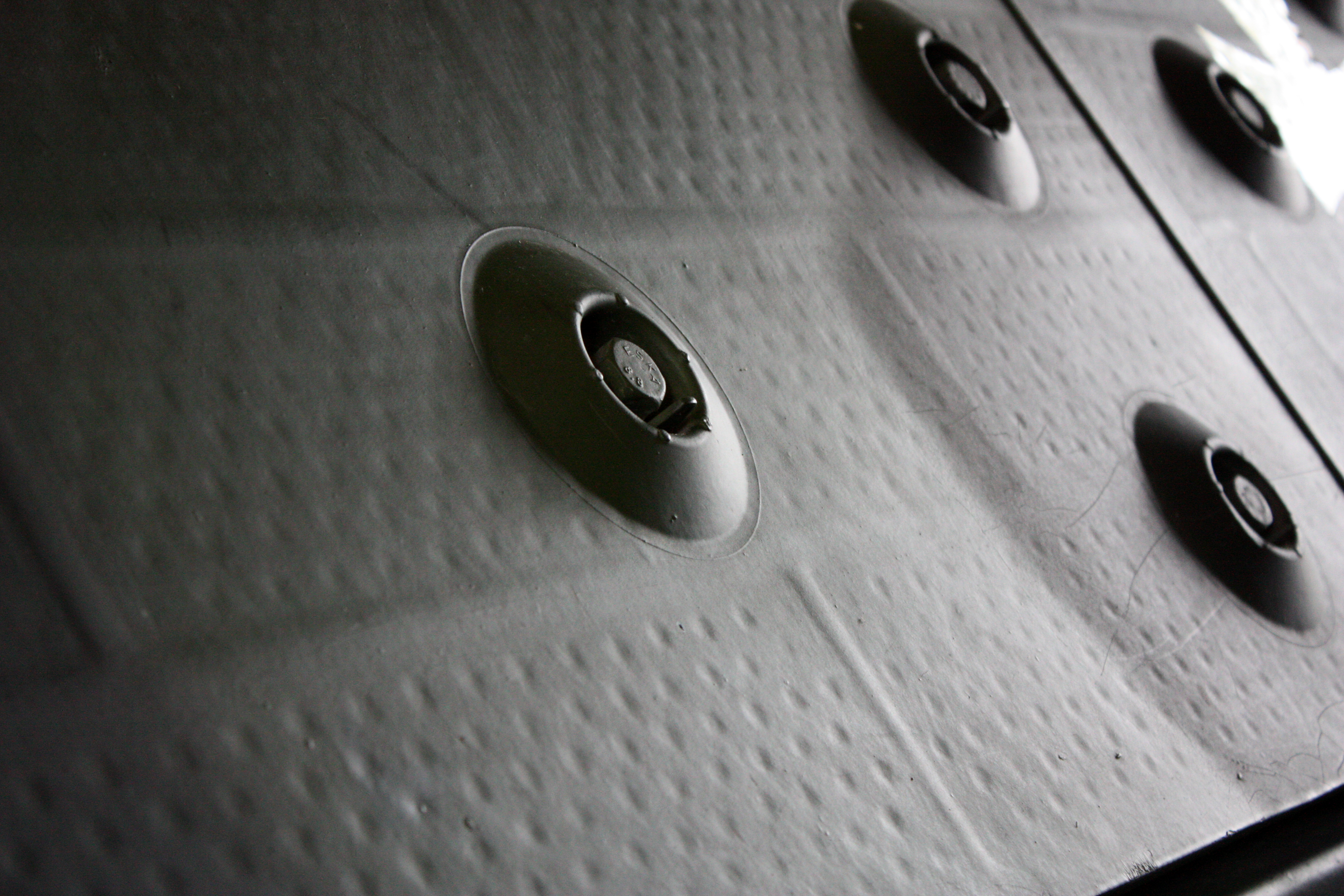
Applique armour

The base armour is formed by the Kanonenjagdpanzer chassis. It was made of welded steel and had a thickness of 10 to 50 mm steel. When the Kanonenjagdpanzers were upgraded, applique armour, consisting of perforated steel plates coated in a rubber-like substance, was fastened shock-mounted on the front of the vehicle and the side of the casemate structure. Leopard-like side-skirts were also added.

Further protection is provided by eight smoke dischargers, which are now installed on the glacis instead of behind the casemate.

The Jaguar 2's survivability is still mainly reliant on its low profile, high speed and long combat range, which exceeded the combat range of contemporary tanks.

=== Armament ===
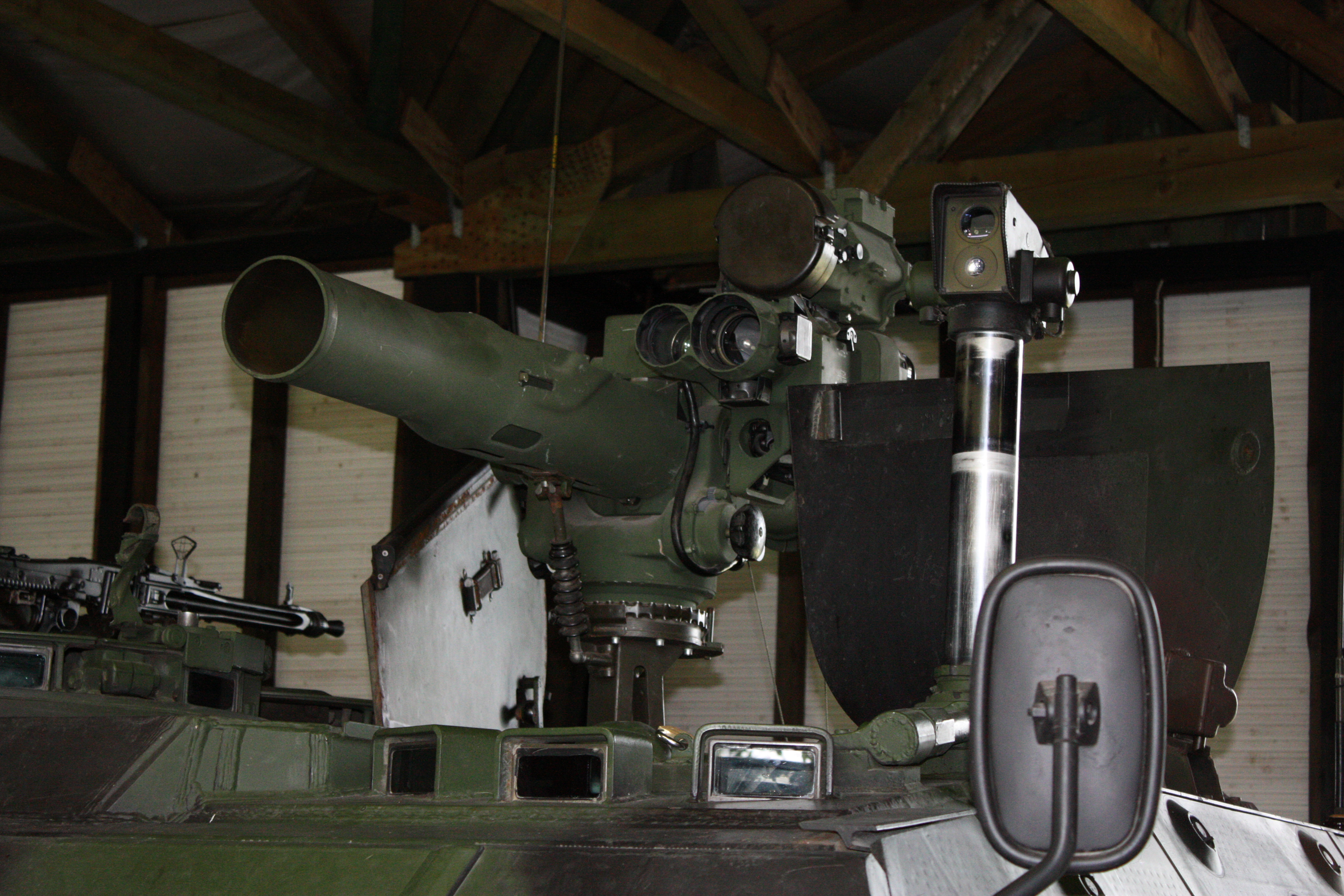
The roof-mounted TOW-launcher

The Jaguar 2 is armed with a TOW-launcher, an anti-aircraft MG3 and an MG3A1 in the hull. The TOW missile allows it to fight enemy tanks at long range; the maximum combat range was considered to be 3,750 m. In 1989, the TOW missiles were replaced by the more powerful TOW-2 missiles. Twelve missiles and 2,100 7.62mm rounds are stored inside the vehicle.
