= Marder (infantry fighting vehicle) =

German infantry fighting vehicle

Schützenpanzer Marder 1
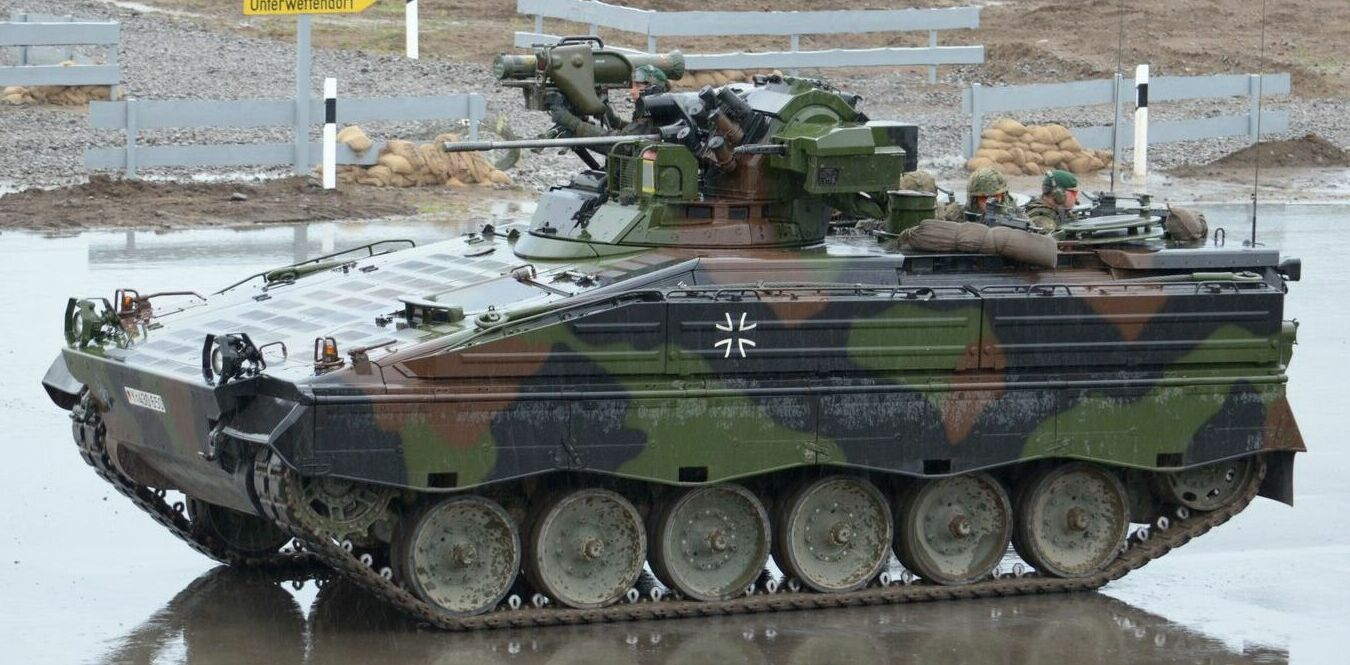
- A German Army Marder 1 in 2012
- Type: Infantry fighting vehicle
- Place of origin: West Germany

Service history
- In service: 1971–present
- Used by: Bundeswehr; Armed Forces of Ukraine
- Wars: Kosovo War; Prizren incident; War in Afghanistan; Russo-Ukrainian War; Russian invasion of Ukraine

Production history
- Designer: Rheinmetall Landsysteme
- Designed: 1959–1969
- Manufacturer: Rheinmetall Landsysteme; Maschinenbau Kiel
- Unit cost: $390,000 2.33 million
- Produced: 1969–1975
- No. built: 2,137 (incl. Marder 2 prototype)

Specifications (Marder 1)
- Mass: 28.5 t (31.4 short tons) Marder 1A1/A2 33.5 t (36.9 short tons) Marder 1A3 37.4 t (41.2 short tons) Marder 1A5
- Length: 6.79 m (22 ft 3 in)
- Width: 3.24 m (10 ft 8 in)
- Height: 2.98 m (9 ft 9 in)
- Crew: 3 crew + 6 passengers (prior to MILAN: 3+7)
- Armor: Welded steel, protection up to 20 mm APDS DM43 from 0 m and 25 mm APDS from 200 m (220 yd)
- Main armament: 20 mm Rheinmetall MK 20 Rh 202 automatic cannon 1,250 rounds MILAN ATGM launcher
- Secondary armament: 7.62 mm MG3 machine gun 5,000 rounds
- Engine: MTU MB 833 Ea-500 diesel engine 441 kW (591 hp)
- Power/weight: 15.7 kW/t (21.1 hp/t)
- Transmission: RENK HSWL 194
- Suspension: Torsion bar
- Ground clearance: 0.45 m (18 in)
- Fuel capacity: 652 L (143 imp gal; 172 US gal)
- Operational range: 520 km
- Maximum speed: 75 km/h (47 mph)Marder 1A2 65 km/h (40 mph) Marder 1A3

The Schützenpanzer Marder 1 (German pronunciation: [ˈʃʏt͜sn̩ˌpant͜sɐ ˈmaʁdɐ ˈaɪ̯ns]; "Infantry fighting vehicle Marten 1") is a tracked German infantry fighting vehicle designed for use with the West German Panzergrenadiere units, mechanized infantry specialized for IFV combat. It has been operated by the German Army as the main Panzergrenadiere IFV since the 1970s through to the present day. Developed as part of the rebuilding of West Germany's armoured fighting vehicle industry, the Marder has proven to be a successful infantry fighting vehicle design.

Although the Marder formerly included several unique features, such as a fully remote machine gun on the rear deck and gun ports on the sides for infantry to fire through, these features were deleted or streamlined in later upgrade packages to bring it more in line with modern IFV design and make manufacturing easier. The rear deck MG was removed, and the gun ports were welded shut and covered with armor. It is overall a simple and conventional machine with one large rear exit hatch and three top hatches for mounted infantry to fire from.

Around 2,100 were taken into service by the West German army in the early 1970s, but the vehicle in its original form was not sold to any foreign militaries. As the German army began to retire older vehicles, the Chilean government agreed to acquire 200 Marders; the government of Greece has considered the purchase of 450 retired vehicles in the past. Argentina uses a simplified and locally produced variant, the VCTP, and has a number of vehicles based on that platform constructed by Henschel and built by TAMSE.

The Marder 1's successor, originally the Marder 2 project in the 1990s, was cancelled, leading to the Puma gradually replacing the Marder in the 2010s.

== Development ==
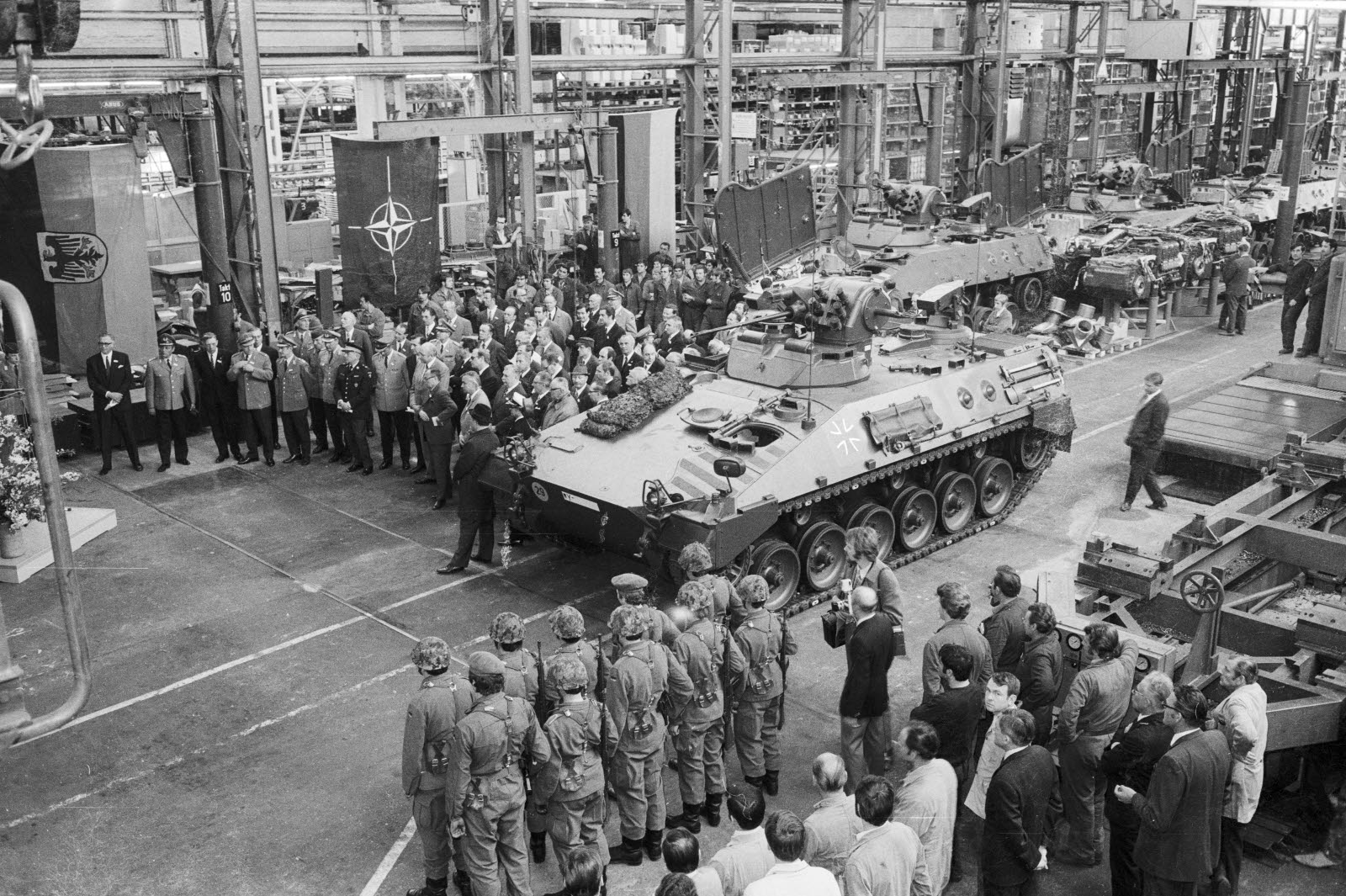
Maschinenbau Kiel AG (MaK) hands over the first Marder to the West German army in May 1971.

Development of the Marder ran from January 1960, when the first development contracts were issued, to May 1971, when the first production vehicles were given to the West German army.

The vehicle was intended to be an improvement over the Schützenpanzer Lang HS.30. The main requirements were:

- A capacity of 12 infantrymen.
- A more reliable 20 mm cannon.
- The infantry must be able to fight from within the vehicle or dismounted.
- Protection from nuclear, biological and chemical weapons.

Initially, development contracts were awarded to two groups of companies: the Rheinstahl group (Rheinstahl-Hanomag, Ruhrstahl, Witten-Annen, Büro Warnecke) and the second group comprising Henschel Werke and the Swiss MOWAG company. This resulted in the production of seven prototype vehicles. A second set of eight prototype vehicles were built between 1961 and 1963. Development priority was then switched for a while to the development of the Jagdpanzer 90 mm Kanone.

In 1967, after military requirements were finalized, a third and final set of ten prototypes were built. Final development work was completed by the Rheinstahl group. 10 pre-production vehicles were built and completed troop trials with the West German army between October 1968 and March 1969. In May 1969, the vehicle was named the "Marder" after the European pine marten, an agile, short-legged, bushy-tailed, medium-sized carnivorous mammal in the weasel family. In October Rheinstahl was chosen as the prime contractor.

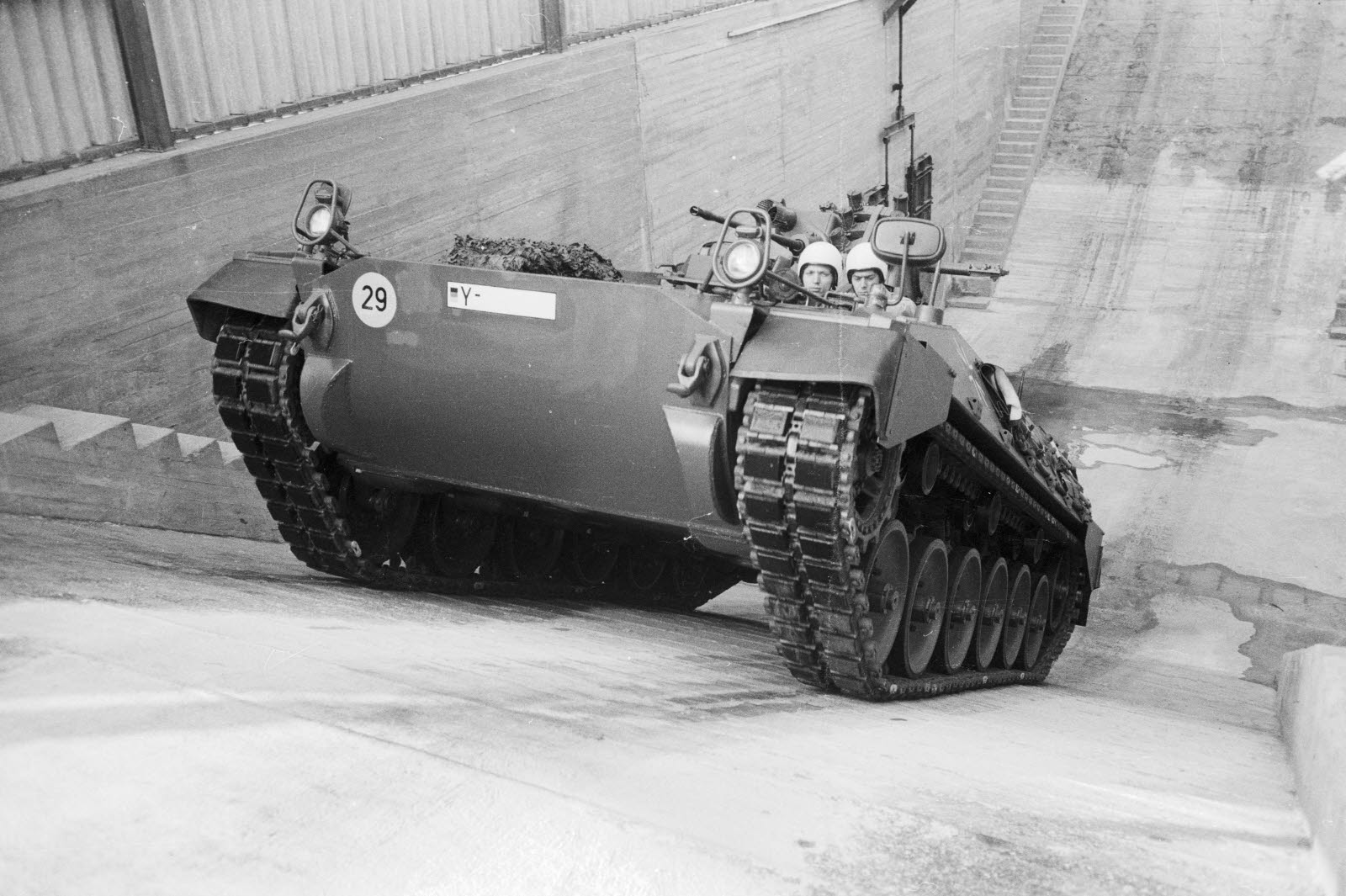
Marder climbing a steep grade at the MaK factory.

The first production Marder was handed to the West German army in May 1971. Production of the vehicle continued until 1975, with 2,136 vehicles being completed.

In 1975, the MILAN anti-tank guided missile was adapted to be fired by the commander from his open hatch. Between 1977 and 1979 MILAN missiles were fitted to the Marders.

A number of upgrade programs were carried out, that included fitting night vision equipment and a thermal imager, as well as an upgraded ammunition feed to the 20 mm cannon.

Around 1985, the designation was changed to Marder 1 (until then it was simply Marder) since a follow-up IFV was under construction. The new vehicle was supposed to be the partner of the Leopard 2, just like Marder was the companion to the Standardpanzer/Leopard 1, it was named Marder 2 and the older vehicles re-designated.

The A3 upgrade program began in 1988. Thyssen-Henschel was awarded a contract to upgrade 2,100 Marder 1 A1/A2 series vehicles to A3 standard, at a rate of 220 a year. The first upgraded vehicles reached the West German army in November 1989. The modification package included:

- Improved armour, weighing 1,600 kg, intended to protect against the 30 mm 2A42 cannon on the Russian BMP-2. The armour provided additional protection against cluster bomblets.
- The hatches over the infantry compartment were rearranged.
- The suspension was reinforced, a new braking system was installed, and the gearbox adjusted. The heating system was replaced with a water based heating system.
- The turret was reconfigured.
- The new total weight was 35,000 kg.

== Description ==
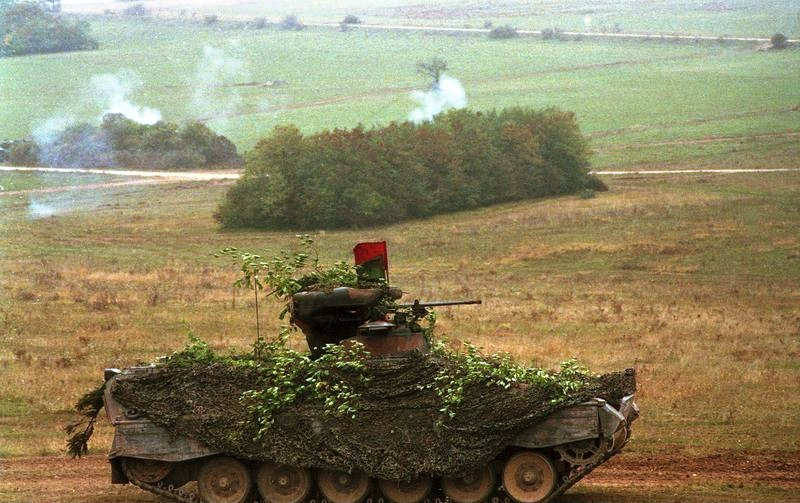
A West German Marder on maneuvers in 1986.

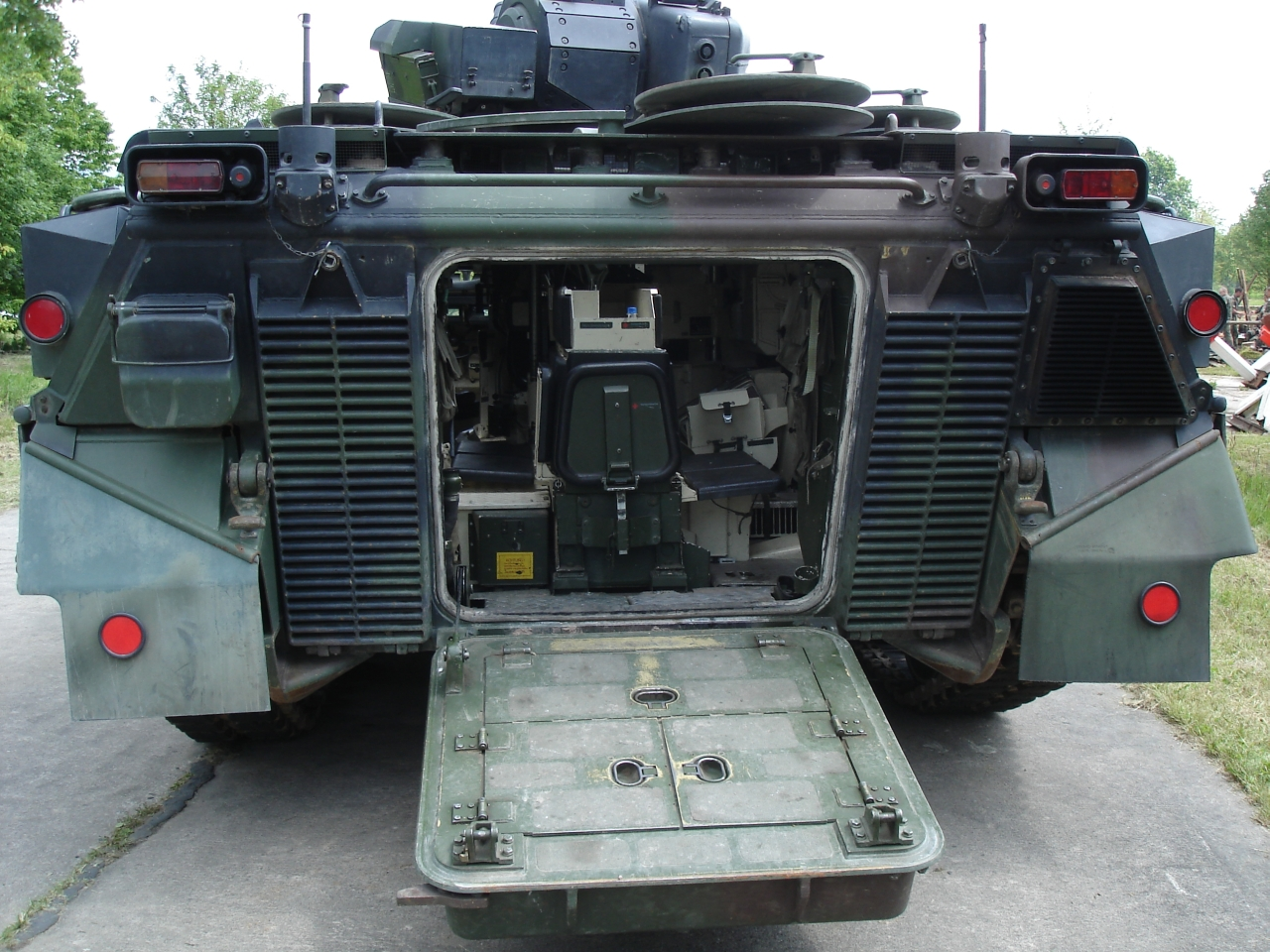
A Marder 1A3 from the rear, with the ramp lowered

The hull of the Marder 1 is all welded steel, giving protection from small-arms fire and shell fragments. The front of the hull provided protection from up to 20 mm armour-piercing discarding sabot (APDS) rounds. Later variants increased protection up to 30mm APDS, in response to the 30 mm autocannon armed BMP-2 and the development of top-attack cluster bomblets.

The Marder is a relatively conventional design, with the driver sitting at the front left side of the hull with the engine to the driver's right. The driver has three day periscopes mounted in a hatch that opens to the right. The center periscope can be replaced by a passive night vision device. Behind the driver is a seat for a single infantryman. In early versions of the Marder, this infantryman had a hatch that opened to the right and a periscope that could be rotated through 360 degrees. This hatch was removed in the 1A3 variant onwards.

In the centre of the hull is the two-man turret, which holds the commander on the right and the gunner on the left. Only the commander is provided with a hatch. The commander has eight day periscopes for all round observation and the gunner has three. The primary sighting system is the PERI-Z11 sight, which has either 2× or 6× optical magnification. From version 1A2 on, there is an additional thermal sight with 2x and 8x magnification. To the rear of the turret is the troop compartment, which can hold six infantry men, sitting back to back facing outwards along the center of the hull.

The Marder is capable of fording in up to 1.5 meters of water unprepared. It can be fitted with a kit allowing it to ford water up to 2.5 meters deep.

The vehicle is powered by an MTU MB 833 Ea-500 six-cylinder liquid-cooled sequentially turbocharged diesel engine which delivers approximately 441 kW (600 PS; 591 hp) at 2,200 rpm. The cooling radiators are mounted at the rear of the hull, either side of the exit ramp. The engine is coupled to a Renk four speed HSWL 194 planetary gear box, with four forward and four reverse gears. The transmission also provides steering and braking via a stepless hydrostatic unit, which transmits power to two drive units mounted at the front of the hull. The vehicle carries 652 liters of fuel, giving it a road range of around 500 kilometres. Early Marders could achieve a road speed of 75 km/h in 4th gear, but the extra armour of later vehicles reduced this to 65 km/h.

The Marder is propelled by a Diehl track, which can be fitted with rubber road pads or metallic grousers for improved mobility in snow. The drive mechanism consists of six rubber tyred road wheels, with a drive sprocket at the front of the hull and an idler at the rear. Three return rollers are fitted. The suspension is a torsion bar system, with hydrostatic shock absorbers fitted to the front two and last two road wheels.

=== Armament ===
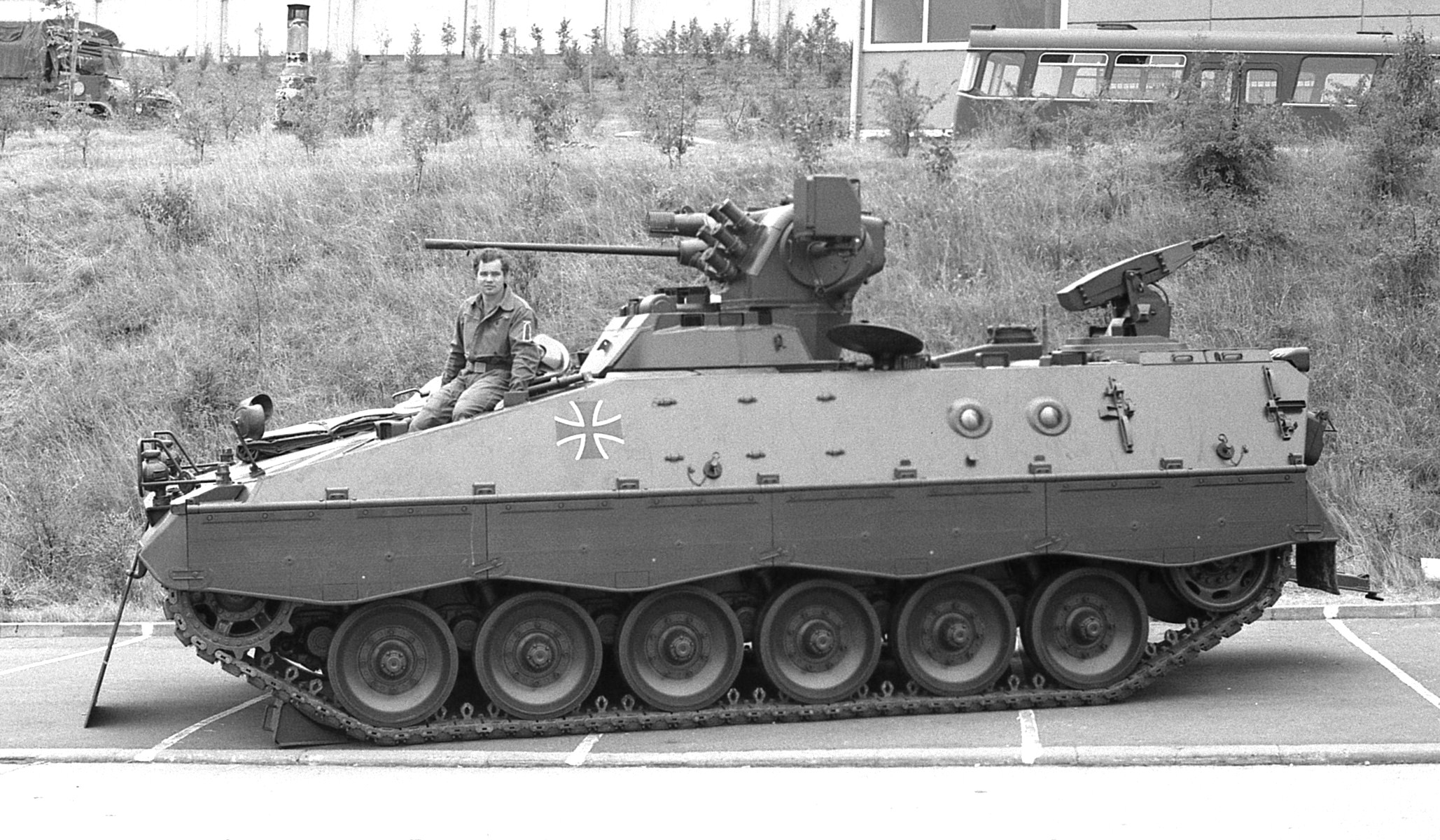
Early Marder with remote-controlled rear-facing machine gun pod

The primary armament is the 20 mm Rheinmetall MK 20 Rh202 autocannon. It is mounted in the small two-man turret and can fire either armour-piercing or HE rounds. Mounted coaxially to the left of the cannon is a 7.62 mm MG 3 machine gun. The turret has 360 degree traverse, and can elevate from −17 degrees to +65 degrees, at a rate of 40 degrees per second while traversing at a rate of 60 degrees a second.

Early production Marders, up to and including version 1A1 had a second, rear-facing MG 3 mounted on the rear deck in a remote controlled pod and operated by one of the mounted infantry using a co-axial PERI-Z12 periscope sight (with a 180° horizontal traverse arc and a vertical arc of -15° to +55°). Typically, 1,250 rounds are carried for the 20 mm cannon, along with a further 5,000 rounds for the MG3.

On models since version 1A1A, a MILAN anti-tank guided missile launcher can be attached to the turret to provide enhanced anti-armour capabilities. Typically, four missiles are carried inside the vehicle.

There are four gun ports, two per side, which can be used by mounted infantry to provide additional fire against attacking infantry targets. Only Marder 1A1 and 1A2 were equipped with this. Marder 1A3 and above do not have gun ports due to the fitting of an extra layer of armour and outside storage boxes.

Six 76-millimeter-diameter smoke grenade dischargers can create a visual and infrared blocking smoke screen.

== Combat service ==
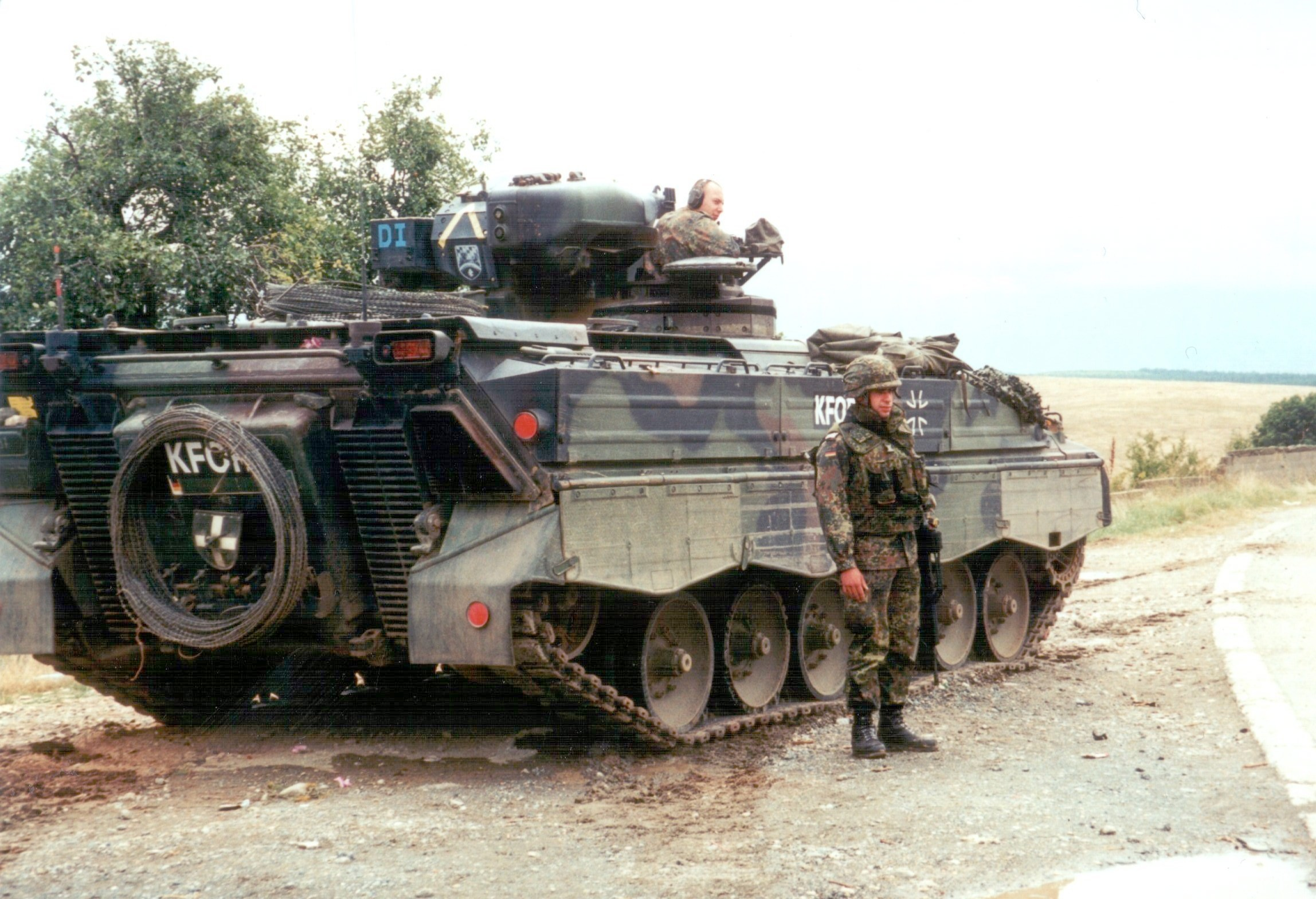
A Marder deployed with German peacekeeping troops in Kosovo, 1999.

With the first unit delivered in summer 1971, the Marder IFV remained untested in combat for 38 years until July 2009 when they defended a German combat outpost against the Taliban in Chahar Dara district of Afghanistan's Kunduz Province, killing and wounding scores of enemies. Since then, the Marders have been involved in heavy fighting several times. The vehicles have proved to be extremely useful and have been praised as a great tactical asset by German troops. However, the crews have been subject to great physical stress as none of the vehicles are equipped with air conditioning systems.

Two Marders were damaged by the use of an improvised explosive device in the course of a German-led offensive on Taliban fighters in Quatliam, on 31 October 2010. Later in the battle, code-named by the Coalition "Operation Halmazag", a single Marder beat off a Taliban attempt to outflank positions held by German paratroopers. On 2 June 2011, a German Marder was destroyed near Kunduz by a 200 kg (440.91 lbs.) IED, killing one soldier and injuring five others.

The Marder was deployed during the Kosovo War as part of the German peacekeeping forces sent as part of NATO's Kosovo Force (KFOR).

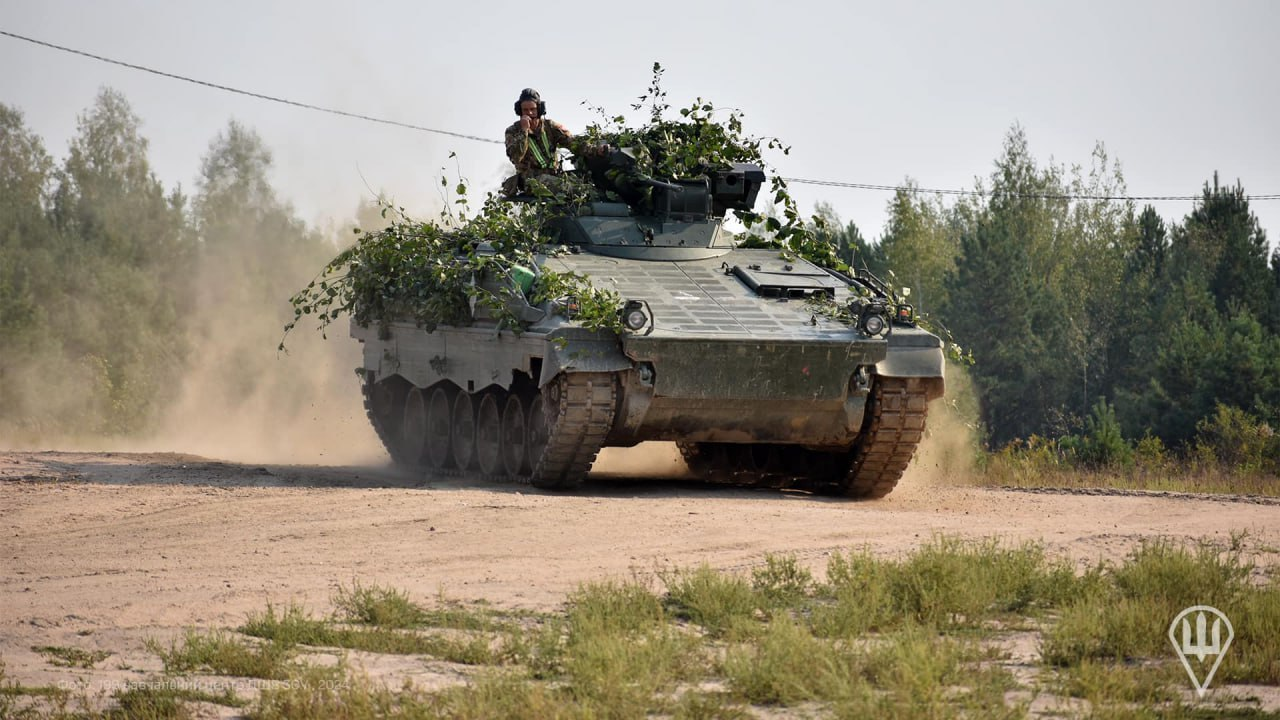
Ukrainian Marder 1A3 during training

On 29 March 2023, Ukrainian Minister of Defence Oleksii Reznikov announced that Marders donated from Germany during the 2022 Russian invasion of Ukraine had arrived in the country. They were first used by the 82nd Air Assault Brigade in August as part of the 2023 Ukrainian counteroffensive; 100 vehicles had been delivered by that time.

According to the Oryx blog as of 9 May 2025, at least 47 Ukrainian Marders 1A3 had been visually recorded lost by photos or videos; 28 destroyed, 12 damaged or abandoned and 7 captured.

== Variants ==
The Marder 1A3 is currently the most common version of this system, and is in service with the German Bundeswehr. The Marder 1A4 differs from the 1A3 only by the use of a cryptography-capable radio-set. The newest version of the Marder is the Marder 1A5 with advanced mine protection. Only a small number of this variant is in service.

=== Main-IFV models ===
- Marder 1 (1971–)
  - Marder 1 with MILAN: A MILAN launcher was fitted to all Marders between 1977 and 1979 which reduced infantry capacity to six.
  - Marder 1 A1(+) (1979–1982): Dual feed for the 20 mm cannon enabling choice of ammunition, night vision equipment including image intensifiers and a thermal pointer. Applied to 674 vehicles between 1979 and 1982.
  - Marder 1 A1(−) (1979–1982): As A1(+) but without thermal pointer. 350 vehicles upgraded to this standard.
    - Marder 1 A1A3: A Marder A1 with SEM 80/90 cryptographic radios.
  - Marder 1 A1A: As 1 A1 but without any passive night vision equipment. 1,112 vehicles upgraded to this standard.
    - Marder 1 A1A4: A Marder A1A with SEM 80/90 cryptographic radios.
  - Marder 1 A1A2: A converted Marder 1 with A1 turret and A2 chassis
    - Marder 1 A1A5: A Marder A1A2 with SEM 80/90 cryptographic radios.
  - Marder 1 A2 (1984–1991): Between 1984 and 1991, all West German Marder 1s were upgraded to A2 standard. This included substantial modification of the suspension, fuel tanks, cooling system and water-jet cleaning system. A new sighting system was installed. The infrared search light equipment was removed. All vehicles were fitted with thermal imagers except for the 674 A1(+) vehicles, which already had the thermal pointer system.
    - Marder 1 A2A1: A Marder 1 A2 with SEM 80/90 cryptographic radios.
  - Marder 1 A3 (1988–1998): A Marder with upgraded armor (involved extra frontal armor), suspension changes and other modifications.
  - Marder 1 A4: A Marder 1 A3 with SEM 93 cryptographic radio.
  - Marder 1 A5 (2003–2004): Additional anti-mine armor and a completely remodeled interior in order to avoid blast and shock injuries to the crew when hit by a mine. Applied to 74 Marder 1 A3s only.
    - Marder 1 A5A1 (2010–2011): Equipped with an air conditioning system, a jammer for IED-protection and multi-spectral camouflage. In December 2010 ten vehicles were brought to this standard, with a further 25 to be upgraded by August 2011.
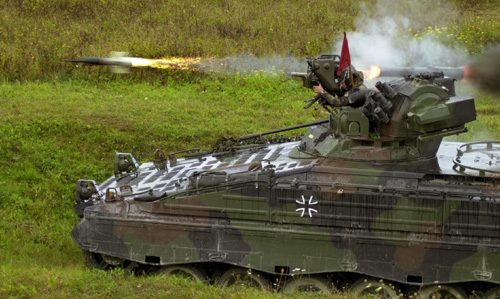
A Marder 1A3 fires a MILAN missile during an exercise.

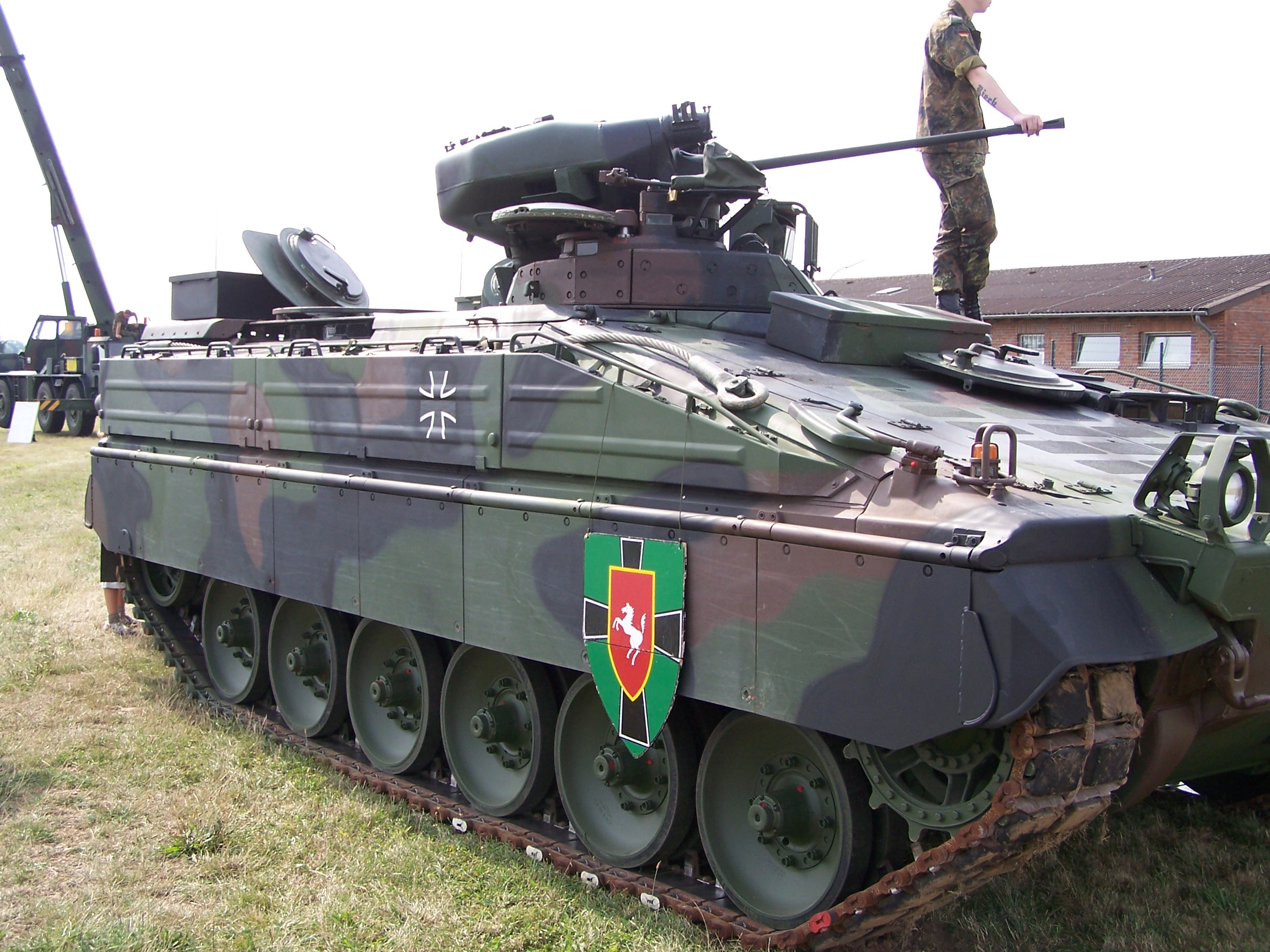
A Marder 1A5

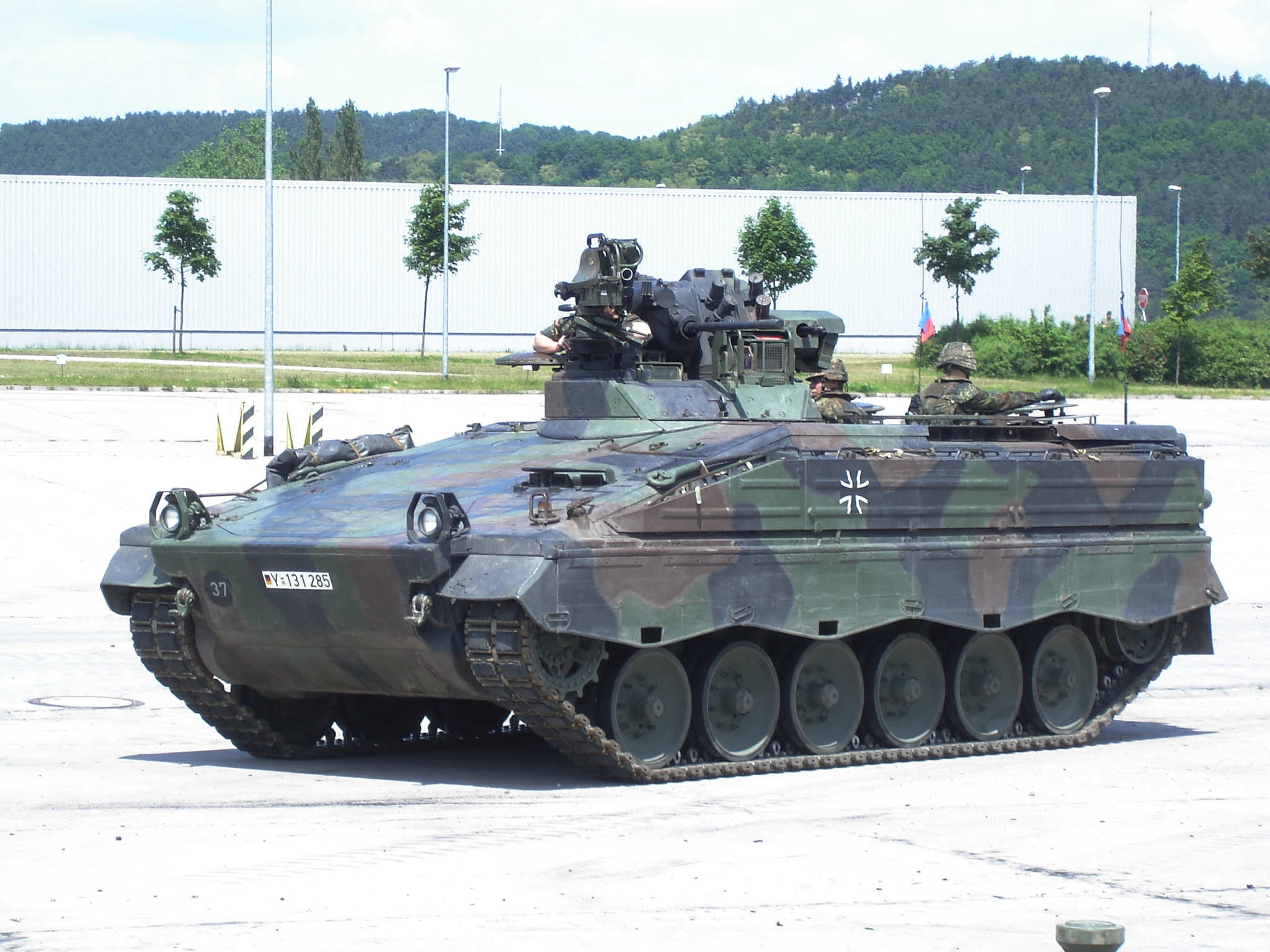
A Marder 1A3 of Panzergrenadier Battalion 391 in 2006.

=== Derivative models ===
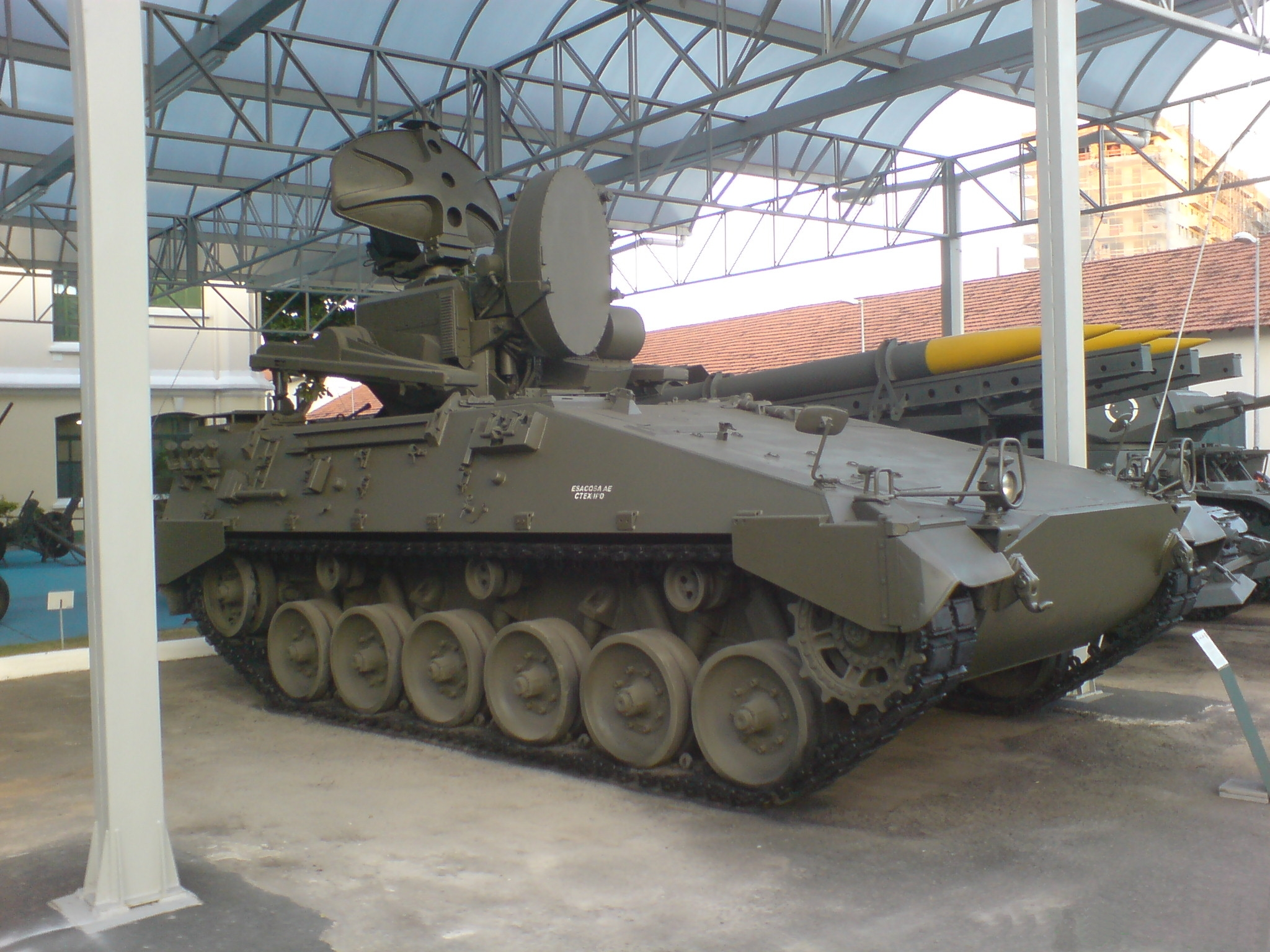
A Brazilian Marder-Roland.

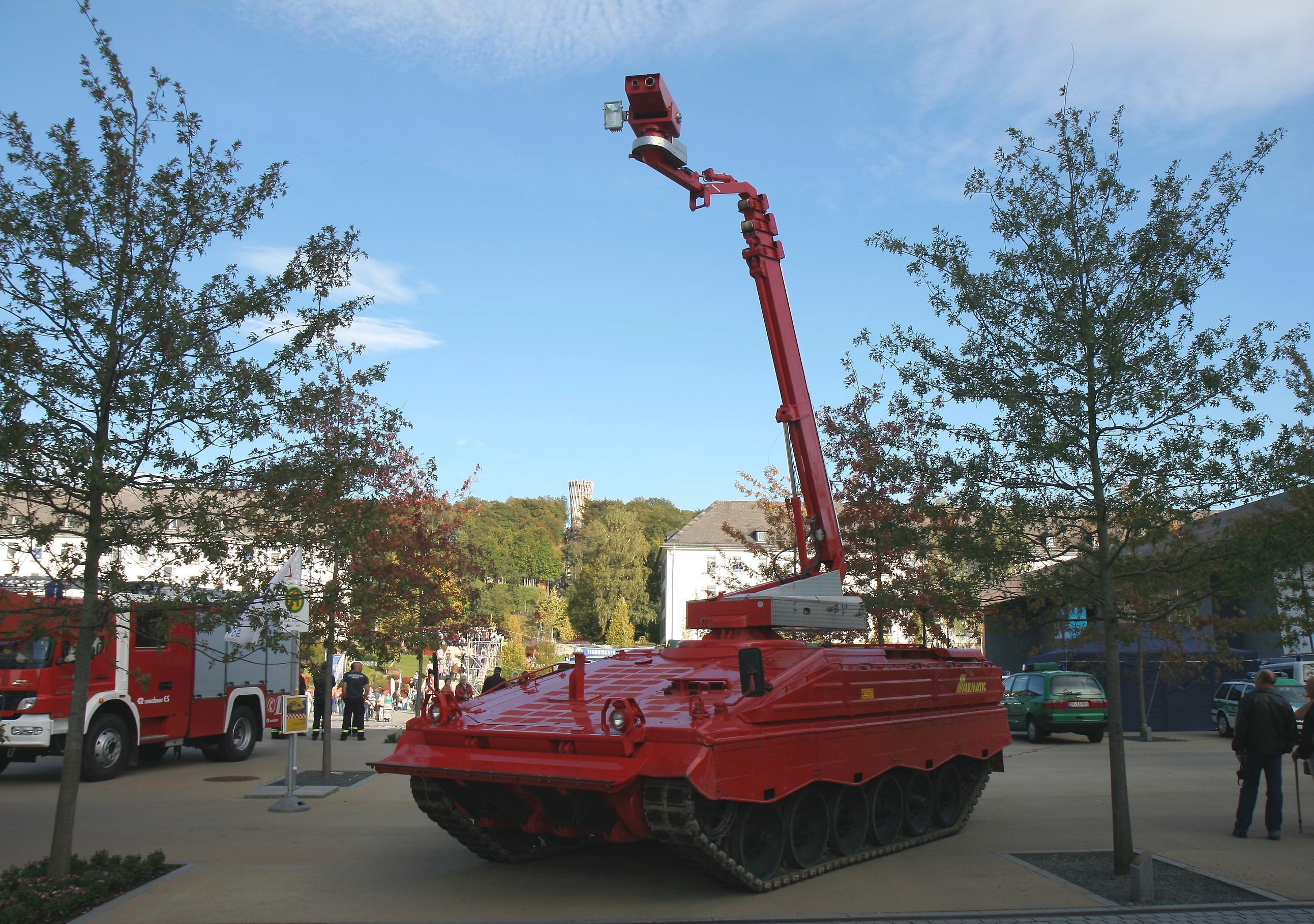
A Marder infantry fighting vehicle converted for use as a firefighting vehicle with the German Fire Services.

The Marder served as the basis for Thyssen Henschel's medium tank design which became the TAM for Argentina. A simplified version of the Marder is also employed as an infantry fighting vehicle, mortar carrier and command vehicle by the Argentine Army, realising most of the versions originally planned for the Bundeswehr and later abandoned due to costs and/or the availability of cheap alternatives like the M106 mortar carrier.

The Marder is used as a carrier for the Roland air defence system. The Kanonenjagdpanzer and Raketenjagdpanzer 2 started development as part of the Marder family but were realised based on the second batch of prototypes using different engines etc. The Kanonenjagdpanzer built for Belgium are a hybrid between the original Bundeswehr version and Marder parts. Some 4–6 test models of a 120 mm mortar on a Marder chassis were built, and at least one is in use as a firefighting vehicle at the WTS Meppen. Tests with an AAA tank were performed but the high weight of the system resulted in a switch to the heavier Standardpanzer chassis, resulting in the Gepard AAA system. At least one first or second generation prototype was equipped with the 110 mm artillery rocket system that later became the truck-mounted LARS system.

During the Eurosatory Show 2012, Rheinmetall Landsysteme GmbH offered two further upgrades as part of the Marder Evolution family. The first upgrade was the Marder APC which features a new M151 Protector remotely controlled weapon, replacing the original Rheinmetall MK 20 Rh 202 automatic cannon, ballistic protection comparable to STANAG Level 4+, and mine protection comparable to Level 3a/3b+. The top deck has been lifted to enable improved ergonomics and uses a 440 kW (600 PS) MTU MB883 diesel. The other upgrade was the Marder Medium Tank which features a rifled, stabilized 105 mm OTO-Melara gun in a new turret.

At Indo Defence 2016, Rheinmetall exhibited the Marder Medium Tank RI ("RI" stands for "Republic of Indonesia"), which was offered to the Indonesian Army, at the time already operating the Marder 1A3. The tank used the Marder 1A3 hull, with the three-crew Leonardo HITFACT turret armed with an OTO-Melara 105 mm gun and two 7.62 mm machine guns used in coaxial and roof-mounted positions. The HITFACT turret was equipped with an advanced fire control system, linked with the commander and gunner sights, a laser rangefinder, and day/thermal sights for both the commander and gunner. Improvements included upgraded suspension, a new MTU diesel engine with 690 hp (510 kW), and the availability to mount a modular armour package.

=== Marder 2 ===
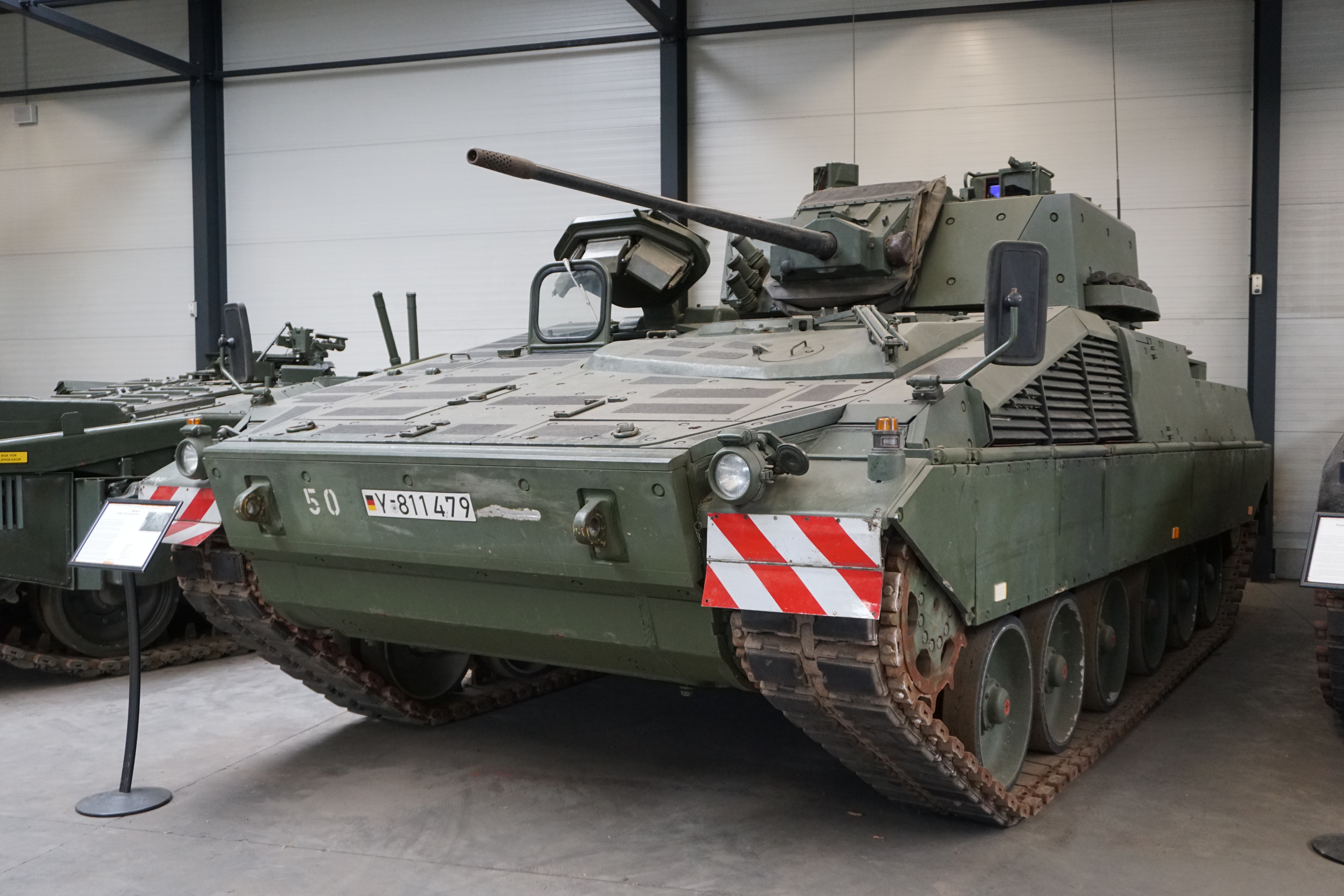
A Marder 2 prototype at the Bundeswehr Museum of German Defense Technology.

Schützenpanzer Marder 2 was a 1991 prototype German infantry fighting vehicle intended as a replacement design to the Schützenpanzer Marder 1. The project started in 1984 and was cancelled in 1992.

A prototype is preserved at the Bundeswehr Museum of German Defense Technology.

== Operators ==
=== Current operators ===
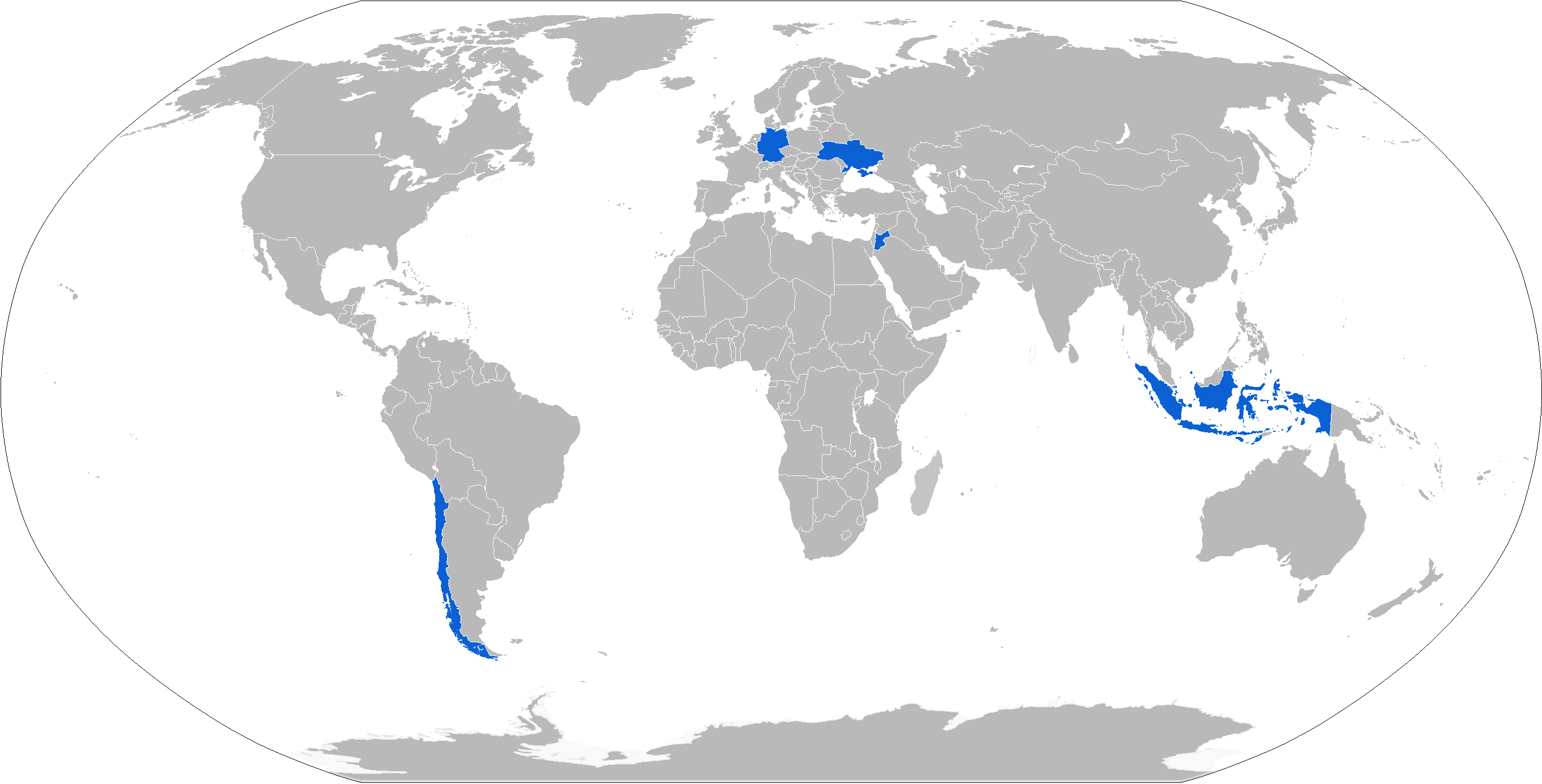
A map of Marder operators in blue

| Country | Type | Quantity (Estimated) | Origin | Notes |
|---|---|---|---|---|
| Chile | 1A3 | 280 | Germany | 180 Marder 1A3 originally ordered from Germany in 2007 since the Dutch YPR-765 AIFVs and M113 APCs could not keep pace with their main battle tanks. Additional orders brought the total number to 280. The first batch of 200 Marder 1A3s ordered included 7 driver-training vehicles and 30 broken down for spare parts. All sourced from Bundeswehr stocks. |
| Germany | 1A2/1A3/ FlaRakPz 1 Roland (in storage with private industry) | ~1067 | West Germany; Germany | 2,137 Marders built in total. 2,097 vehicles were upgraded to the Marder 1A3 standard between 1989-1998. 140 Marders were converted to Roland 2 tracked surface-to-air systems from 1978-1983, though the Roland systems were retired from service in 2005. By 2009, Germany had approximately 1,911 operational Marder IFVs of the 1A2 and 1A3 variant. Many were sold off to other countries or to private companies like Rheinmetall. Following sales and exports to various countries, an estimated 1067 remain in storage in various states of combat-capability as of 2023. Hundreds are in outdoor storage with KMW's subsidiary Battle Tank Dismantling GmbH Koch in Rockensußra, Thuringia where they are broken down and recycled. |
| Germany | 1A3 [upgraded] | 262 | Germany | By 2017 the Bundeswehr owned 382 Marder of the 1A3/1A4/1A5 variants, with only 212 in operational service as the others were undergoing refits contracted in 2016. In 2020, Rheinmetall was contracted to further upgrade 260 Marder to have modern thermal imaging systems for gunner and commander. Over 170 to be equipped with new drivers night vision sights. The Bundeswehr has approximately 262 active service Marder 1A3 following the transfer of 20 to Ukraine from its stocks in 2023. Officially replaced with the Puma, the Marder will remain in service until at least 2025. |
| Germany | 1A4 | 26 | Germany | 26 Marder 1A3s converted into command vehicles with SEM 93 long range radios. To be upgraded and continue to operate beyond 2025. |
| Germany | 1A5 | 74 | Germany | 74 Marder 1A3s were upgraded by Rheinmetall to 1A5 variant between 2003-2004. In 2020, 71 of these were contracted to have their drivetrain upgraded with new power packs to enhance the vehicle's responsiveness and boost the engine output from 600hp to >750hp. |
| Greece | 1A3 | 40 | Germany | 40 Marder 1A3 were pledged to Greece by Germany as part of the latter's "Ringtausch" exchange program in exchange for Greece deliverying 40 BMP-1 vehicles to Ukraine. It received its first 6 in November 2022. 14 were delivered as of January 2023. Further deliveries to Greece were reportedly halted by Rheinmetall due to the company's commitments to deliver more Marder IFVs to Ukraine and a lack of supply. However, all 40 were delivered by the July 2023. |
| Indonesia | 1A3 | 50 | Germany | 50 second hand Marder 1A3s received from the stockpiles of the German Army. Deliveries began in 2015. |
| Jordan | 1A3 | 75 | Germany | Jordan initially ordered 50 Marder 1A3 on 11 December 2016. Rheinmetall was contracted to upgrade these from Bundeswehr stocks and deliver them by 2017. In 2017, Rheinmetall was contracted to upgrade an additional 25 Marder 1A3 for Jordan. All 75 delivered by the summer of 2020, including two driver training vehicles and spare parts. |
| Ukraine | 1A3 | 140 (47 lost); 25 pending delivery | Germany | The first Marder 1A3 were delivered in March 2023. 20 Marder 1A3 delivered from Bundeswehr stocks, 60 delivered from Rheinmetall stocks as of 23 December 2023. As of January 2025, 140 have been delivered by Rheinmetall, with an additional 25 ordered and pending delivery. As 28 July 2025, 47 Marders were lost according to the Oryxblog. |

=== Former operators ===
- Brazil had purchased 4 Roland 2 systems on the German Marder 1A2 chassis along with 50 missiles in the late 1970s, with all 4 being retired from service in 2001. In 2024, the Brazilian Army restored one of the vehicles for historical purposes.

== See also ==
- List of modern armoured fighting vehicles
- Mechanized infantry
- BMD-4 – (Russia)
- Bradley Fighting Vehicle – (United States)
- BTR-T – (Russia)
- Combat Vehicle 90 – (Sweden)
- Makran IFV – (Iran)
- Puma – (Germany)
- Tulpar – (Turkey)
- T-15 Armata – (Russia)
- Warrior IFV – (United Kingdom)
- ZBD-04 – (China)
- ZBD-05 – (China)
