= Kanonenjagdpanzer =

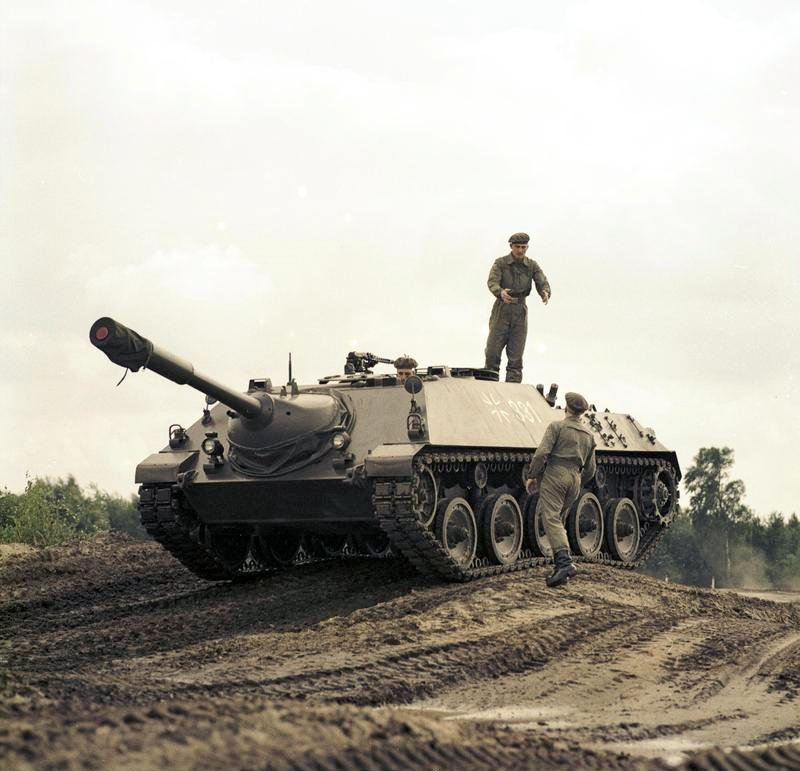
- A Kanonenjagdpanzer in 1968
- Type: Self-propelled anti-tank gun
- Place of origin: West Germany

Service history
- In service: 1965–1991
- Used by: West Germany; Belgium

Production history
- Designer: Henschel and Hanomag
- Designed: 1960
- Manufacturer: Henschel and Hanomag
- Produced: 1965–1967
- No. built: 770

Specifications
- Mass: 27.5 t (27.1 long tons; 30.3 short tons)
- Length: Total: 8.75 m (28 ft 8 in); Hull: 6.24 m (20 ft 6 in)
- Width: 2.98 m (9 ft 9 in)
- Height: 2.09 m (6 ft 10 in)
- Crew: 4 (commander, gunner, loader, driver)
- Armor: 10–50 mm (0.39–1.97 in)
- Main armament: 1 × Rheinmetall BK 90/L40 90mm anti-tank gun 51 rounds
- Secondary armament: 2 × 7.62mm MG3 machine guns 4,000 rounds 8 smoke dischargers 2 × 71mm Lyran mortars (Belgium only)
- Engine: 29.4 L MTU MB 837 Aa V8 water-cooled multi-fuel diesel engine 500 hp (368 kW)
- Suspension: Torsion bar
- Operational range: 385 km (239 mi)
- Maximum speed: 70 km/h (43.5 mph)

The Kanonenjagdpanzer (KanJPz) was a West German Cold War tank destroyer. Its design was very similar to that of the World War II Jagdpanzer IV.

== Name ==
The Kanonenjagdpanzer is also known as the Jagdpanzer, Kanone 90mm ("tank destroyer, 90mm Gun") or Kanonenjagdpanzer 4–5.

== History ==
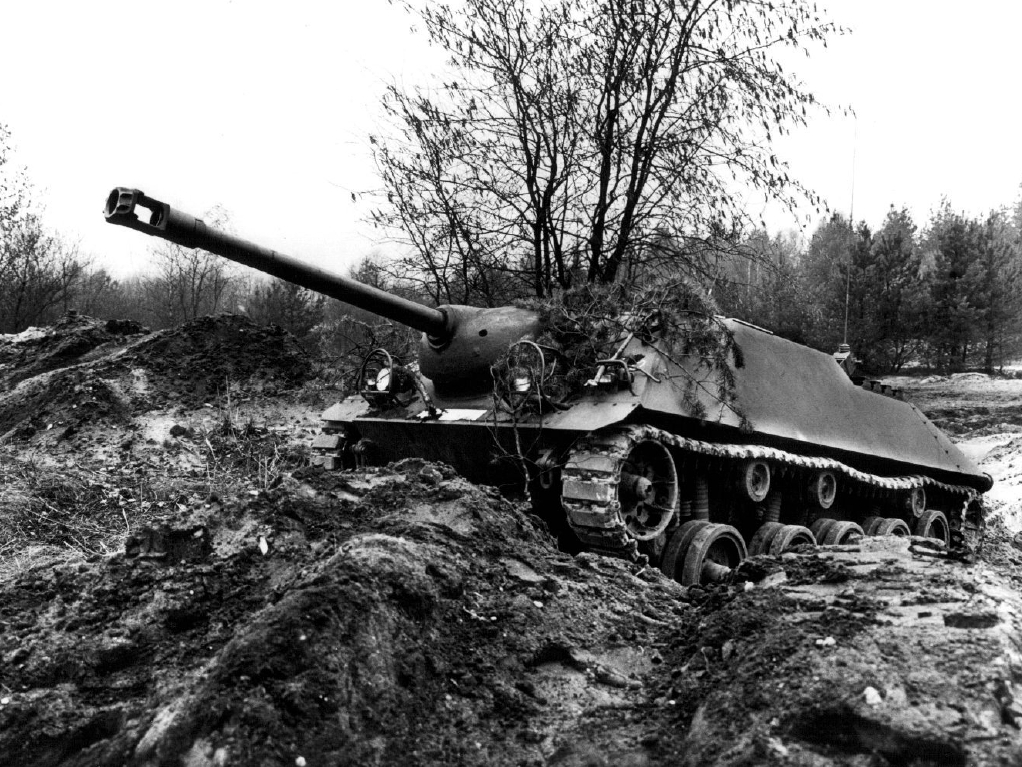
Kanonenjagdpanzer 1-3

The first prototypes of the Kanonenjagdpanzer were built in 1960 on the hulls of the HS-30 Armoured Personnel Carriers (APC) by Hanomag and Henschel for West Germany and by Mowag for Switzerland, based on the experience of the Wehrmacht in the Second World War, the Kanonenjagdpanzer being a development of the Jagdpanzer IV. A second round of six prototypes this time built just by Hanomag and Henschel were constructed between 1962 and 1963. After that another set of six prototypes were built over the next two years still by Hanomag and Henschel. The features of the various prototypes were then combined into the final design.

At least one prototype with the designation Gepard was built by the Mowag firm; it stands today in the Swiss Military Museum at Full. For the Gepard two different two-stroke diesel engines were available, a five-cylinder, 6.7 litre, Type M5 DU Mowag generating 270 horsepower (199 kW) at 2,100 rpm and an 13.5 litre engine generating 540 horsepower (397 kW).

Between 1966 and 1967, 770 units were built for the Bundeswehr, 385 by Hanomag and 385 by Henschel. Eighty of them were delivered to Belgium from April 1975 onward.

When the Soviets began deploying their T-64 and T-72 main battle tanks, the 90 mm gun was not capable of engaging them in long-range combat and the Kanonenjagdpanzer became obsolete. Although the producers claimed it could be rearmed with a 105 mm gun, between 1983 and 1985, 163 of these tank destroyers were converted into Raketenjagdpanzer Jaguar 2 anti-tank guided missile carriers by removing the gun, adding a roof-mounted TOW missile launcher and fastening further spaced and perforated armour on the hull. Some others were refitted into artillery observation vehicles by removing the main gun, so called Beobachtungspanzer lit: Observation tank, which served most particularly in the mortar units.

Some Kanonenjagdpanzer remained in service with the Heimatschutztruppe (Homeland Security Force) until 1991.

== Design ==
The Kanonenjagdpanzer was a highly mobile vehicle, its survivability based on its mobility and its low profile. Its hull consisted of welded steel with a maximum thickness of 50 mm. It carried a crew of four: commander, driver, gunner and loader. Since the Kanonenjagdpanzer followed the casemate design of most World War II tank destroyers, the gun was fixed within the casemate, located a little right from the center. The 90 mm gun could only traverse 15° to the sides and elevate from −8° to +15°. It carried 51 90 mm rounds for the main gun and 4,000 7.62 mm rounds for the two MG3s. The Kanonenjagdpanzer had NBC protection and night-fighting ability.

== Variants ==
- Spähpanzer Ru 251 – variant intended to replace the M41 Walker Bulldog.
- Raketenjagdpanzer 2
- Jaguar 2

== Operators ==
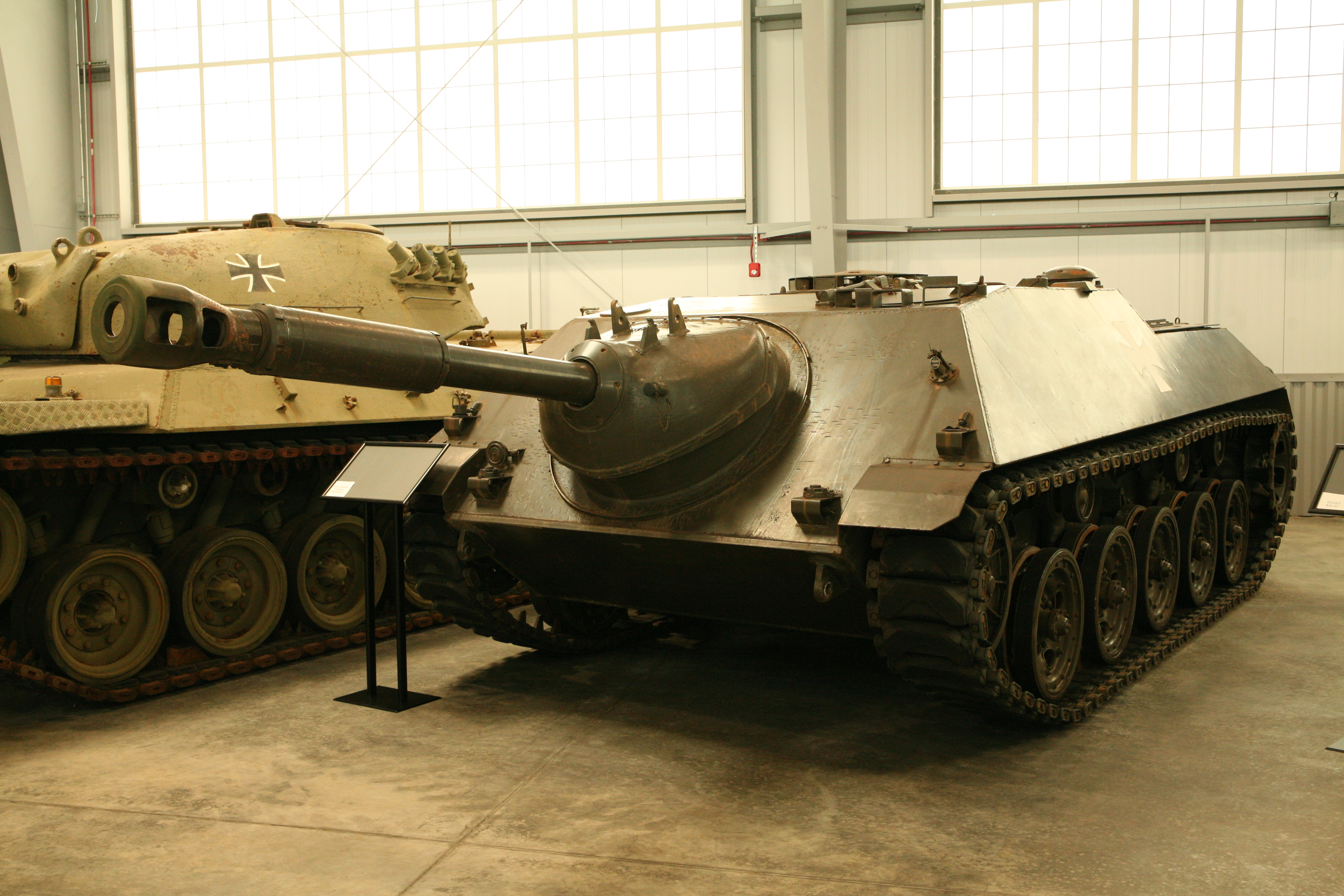
Kanonenjagdpanzer at the U.S. Army Armor and Cavalry Collection, Fort Benning, Georgia

- West Germany – The German Army operated a total of 770 units, known as Kanonenjagdpanzer (KaJaPa) until 1991, Jaguar 2 until 1996 and the Beobachtungs- und Befehlspanzer ("observation and command tank") until 2003. The last named had no gun.
- Belgium – The Belgian Army operated 80 slightly modified Kanonenjagdpanzer from 1975 until the early 1980s.

== Literature ==
- Karl Anweiler, Rainer Blank (1998), Die Rad- und Kettenfahrzeuge der Bundeswehr (1956 to today) (1st ed.), Augsburg: Weltbild Verlag GmbH, pp. 316–318, ISBN 3-8289-5331-X
- André Deinhardt: Panzergrenadiere – eine Truppengattung im Kalten Krieg: 1960 bis 1970. Oldenbourg Wissenschaftsverlag, Munich 2011, ISBN 978-3-48670464-8.
- 3rd revised edition of the catalogue of the Panzermuseum Munster, 1992, publ. Stadt Munster.
