= Raketenjagdpanzer 1 =

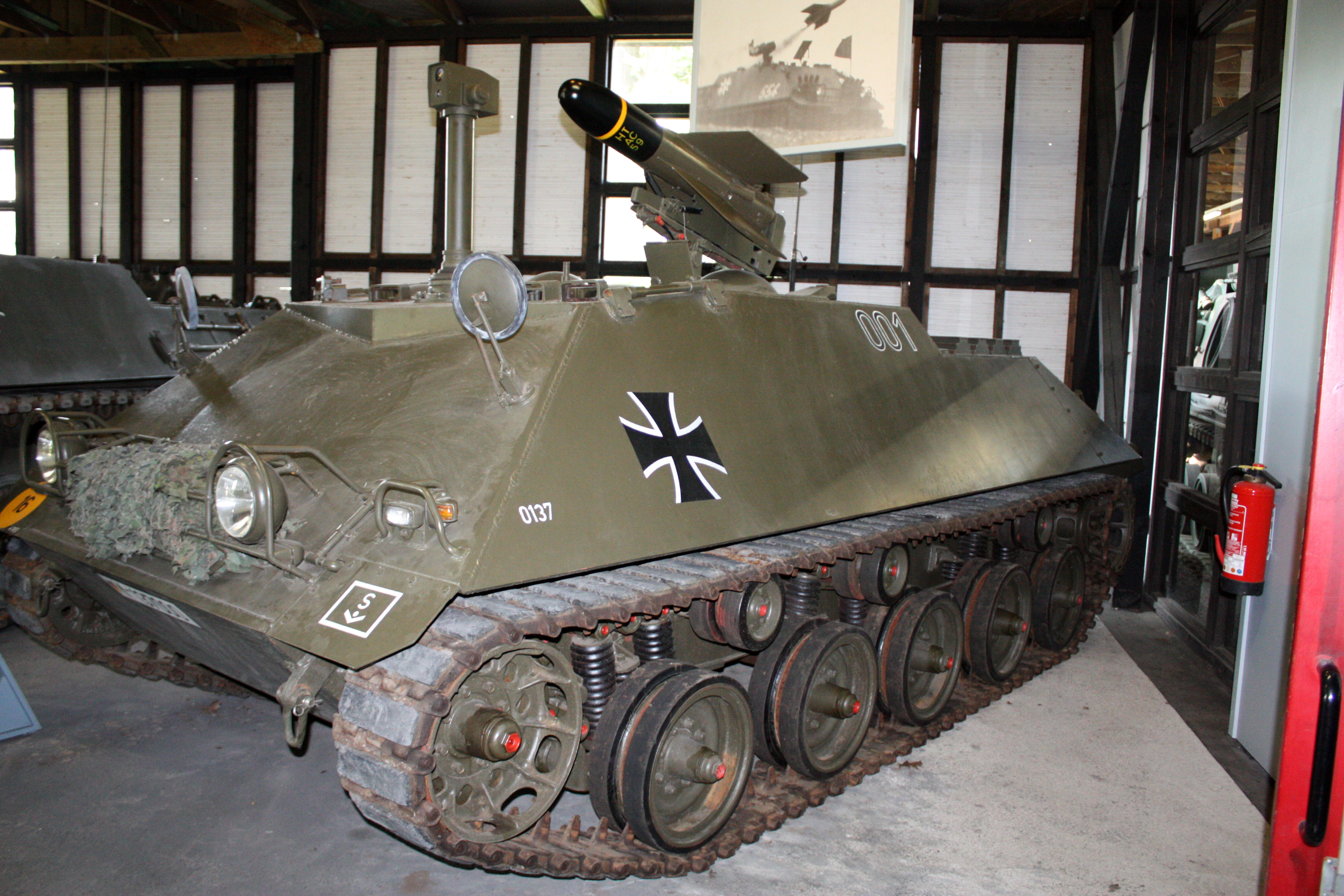
- Type: Anti-tank missile carrier
- Place of origin: West Germany

Service history
- In service: 1961–1967

Production history
- Designed: 1959–1960
- Produced: 1961–1962
- No. built: 95

Specifications
- Mass: 13,000 kg (28,660 lb)
- Length: 5.56 m (18 ft 2 7/8 in)
- Width: 2.54 m (8 ft 4 in)
- Height: 2.10 m (6 ft 10 5/8 in)
- Crew: 4 (commander, gunner, loader, driver)
- Armor: Steel, maximum 30 mm (1.18 in)
- Main armament: 2 × SS.11 missile launchers, 10 missiles
- Secondary armament: 1 × MG3, 2,000 rounds
- Engine: 1× Rolls-Royce B81 Mk 80F, 8-cylinder petrol engine 220 hp (160 kW)
- Suspension: Independent coil-sprung trailing- and leading-link suspension per wheel station
- Operational range: 270 km (170 mi)
- Maximum speed: 51 km/h (32 mph)

The Raketenjagdpanzer 1 is an anti-tank guided missile-armed tank destroyer (the first such vehicle in service with the West German Armed Forces) that entered service in 1961. It was built on the chassis of the Hispano-Suiza HS.30, which was also used on the Schützenpanzer SPz 12-3, and armed with twin French SS.11 antitank guided missile launchers. Only one of the missile launchers is visible from the outside at any time, however, as the other is retracted into the hull to be reloaded when the first is ready to fire.

== Armament ==
The twin mounted launchers for the SS.11 anti-tank guided weapons were the primary armament for the Raketenjagdpanzer 1. With ten missiles per vehicle, the crew had the theoretical ability to destroy ten enemy vehicles, although this was doubtful in practice. The weapon was wire-guided and the gunner continued to control the missile via a small periscope after launch. The SS.11 missile could penetrate 600 mm of rolled homogeneous armor.

== Powerplant ==
The Rolls-Royce B81 Mk 80F engine, which could develop 235 hp @ 3,800 rpm, was chosen to power the Raketenjagdpanzer 1. The engine was capable of pushing the vehicle to speeds of 51 km/h.

== Performance ==
The vehicle had a fording depth of 0.70 metres and was able to climb 60° gradients, clear vertical obstacles of 0.60 metres in height or cross trenches 1.60 metres wide.
