= Raketenjagdpanzer 2 =

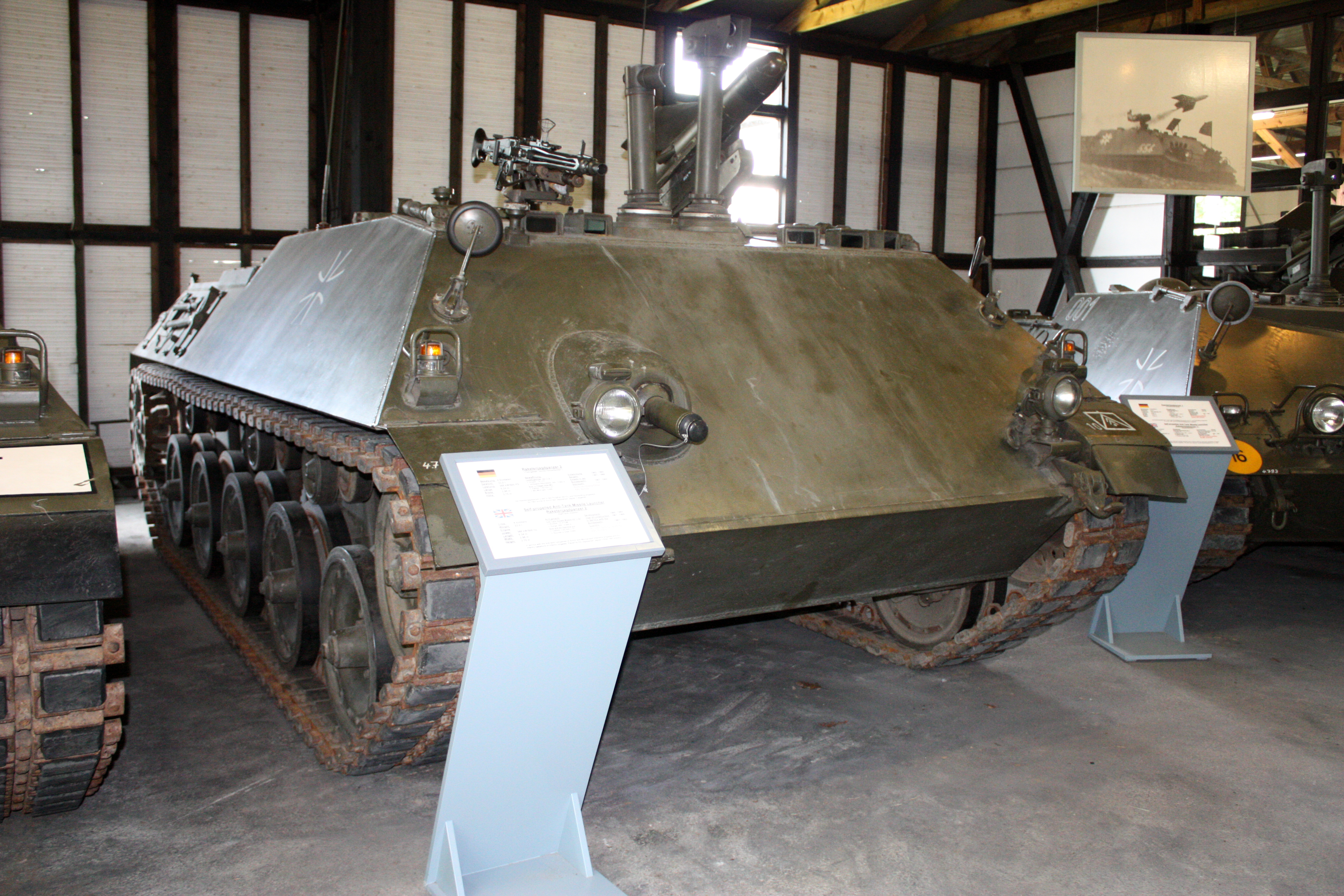
- Type: Anti-tank missile carrier
- Place of origin: West Germany

Service history
- In service: 1967–1982

Production history
- Designed: 1963–1965
- Produced: 1966–1968
- No. built: 318

Specifications
- Mass: 23 tons
- Length: 6.61 m
- Width: 2.98 m
- Height: 2.10 m
- Crew: 4 (commander, gunner, loader, driver)
- Armor: 8–50 mm
- Main armament: 2× SS.11 missile launchers, 14 missiles
- Secondary armament: 2× 7.62mm MG3 machine guns 8× smoke dischargers
- Engine: 29,4l MTU MB 837 Aa V8 water-cooled multi-fuel diesel-engine 500 hp (368 kW)
- Suspension: torsion bar
- Operational range: 385 km
- Maximum speed: 70 km/h

The Raketenjagdpanzer 2 or Raketenjagdpanzer SS-11 was a West German tank destroyer employed from 1967 to 1982 and equipped with Nord SS.11 guided anti tank missiles. It was developed at the same time as the Kanonenjagdpanzer and the Marder, and shares a similar chassis with them.

== Overview ==
The vehicle prototypes were developed between 1963 and 1965. Between 1967 and 1968, Henschel and Hanomag built 318 Raketenjagdpanzer 2 for the Bundeswehr. Starting around 1978, 316 of them were upgraded with additional armour and a new missile system, and redesignated as Raketenjagdpanzer Jaguar 1.

=== Armament ===
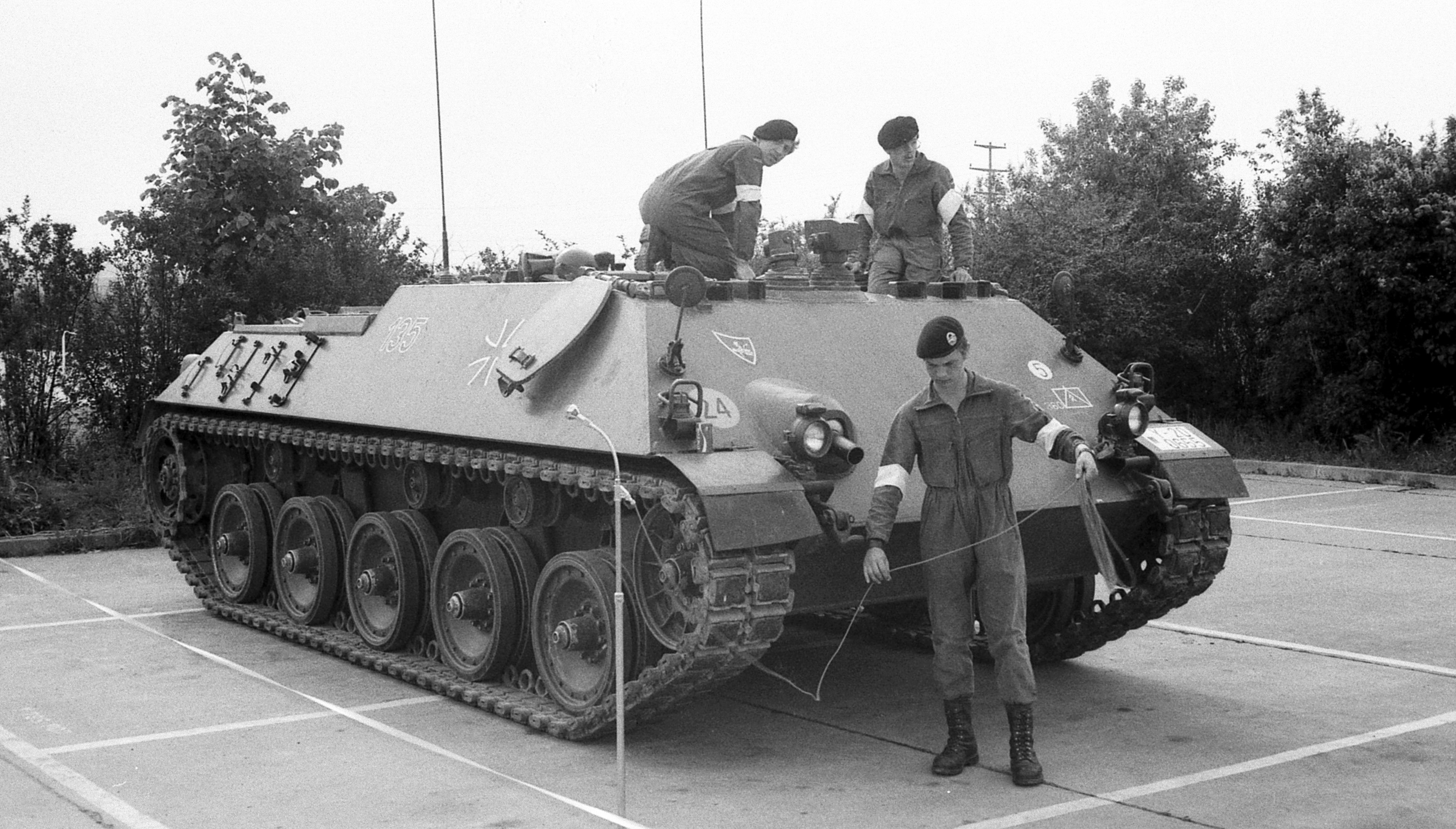
Raketenjagdpanzer 2 (RakJgPz 2, SS11), PzJgKp 360, Külsheim (Main-Tauber-Kreis), 1978.

The vehicle was armed with two launch rails for the Nord SS.11 antitank guided missile, and two MG3 machine guns. The machine guns were mounted in the bow and as an anti-aircraft weapon on top of the vehicle. The Raketenjagdpanzer 2 carried fourteen missiles, twelve of which were mounted in containers inside the vehicle while the other two were attached to the launch rails. The combined traverse of both launch rails covered 180 degrees. The vehicle's mission was to engage enemy tanks at ranges between 1.5 and 3 kilometers where the range and accuracy of tank cannon were inferior to that of the SS.11 missile. The maximum effective range of the SS.11 was around 3,000 meters. The SS.11 missile could penetrate 60 centimeters of rolled homogeneous armour.

=== Service in the Bundeswehr ===
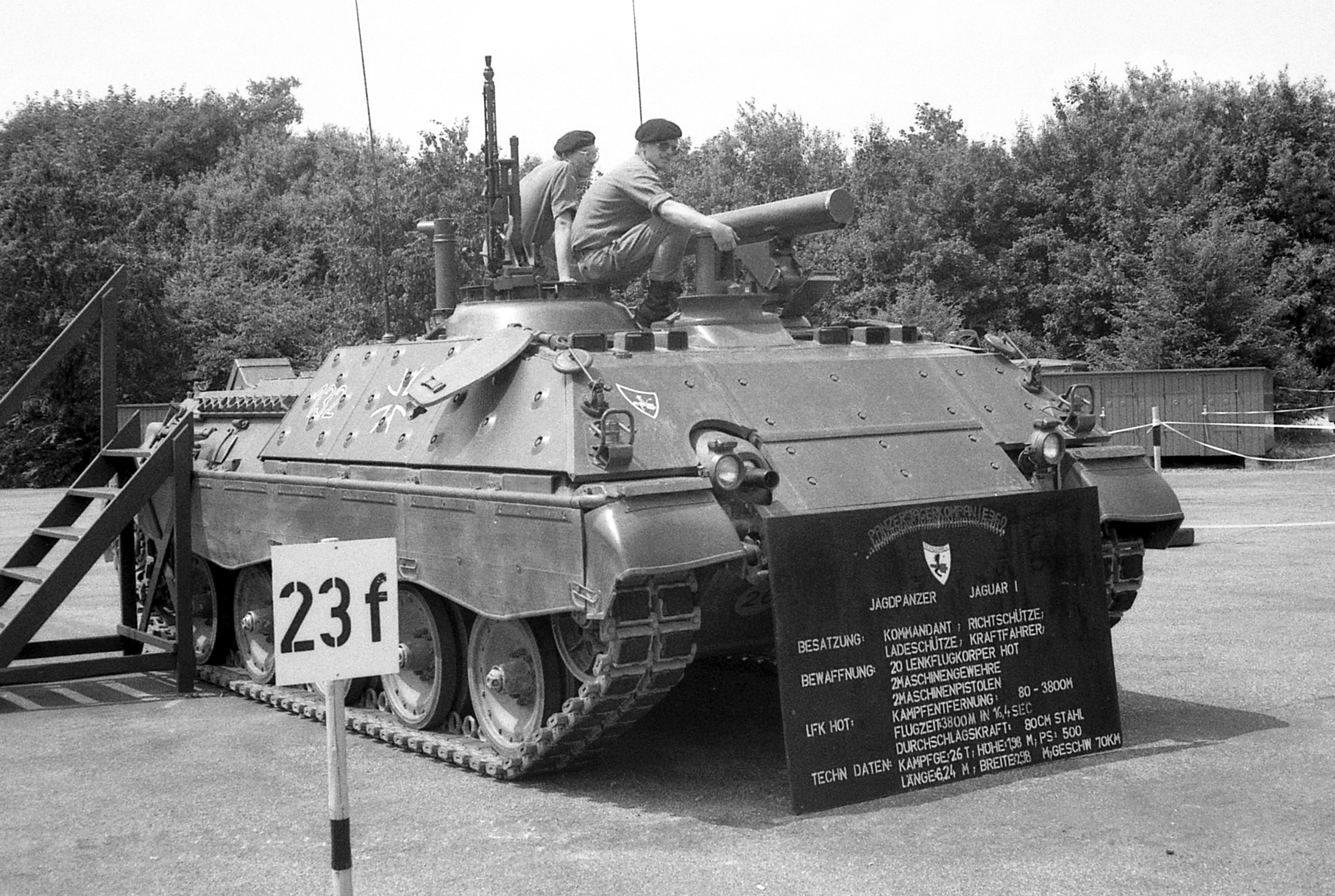
Jaguar 1

The Bundeswehr first operationally deployed the Raketenjagdpanzer 2 in 1967. From 1968 onwards, the tank destroyer companies of the Panzergrenadier (armored infantry) brigades were equipped with eight of these vehicles. At the same time, tank destroyer companies of the Panzer brigades received thirteen Raketenjagdpanzer 2. Between 1978 and 1982, the Raketenjagdpanzer 2 vehicles were upgraded to Euromissile HOT-carrying Jaguar 1 tank destroyers.
