= Jaguar 1 =

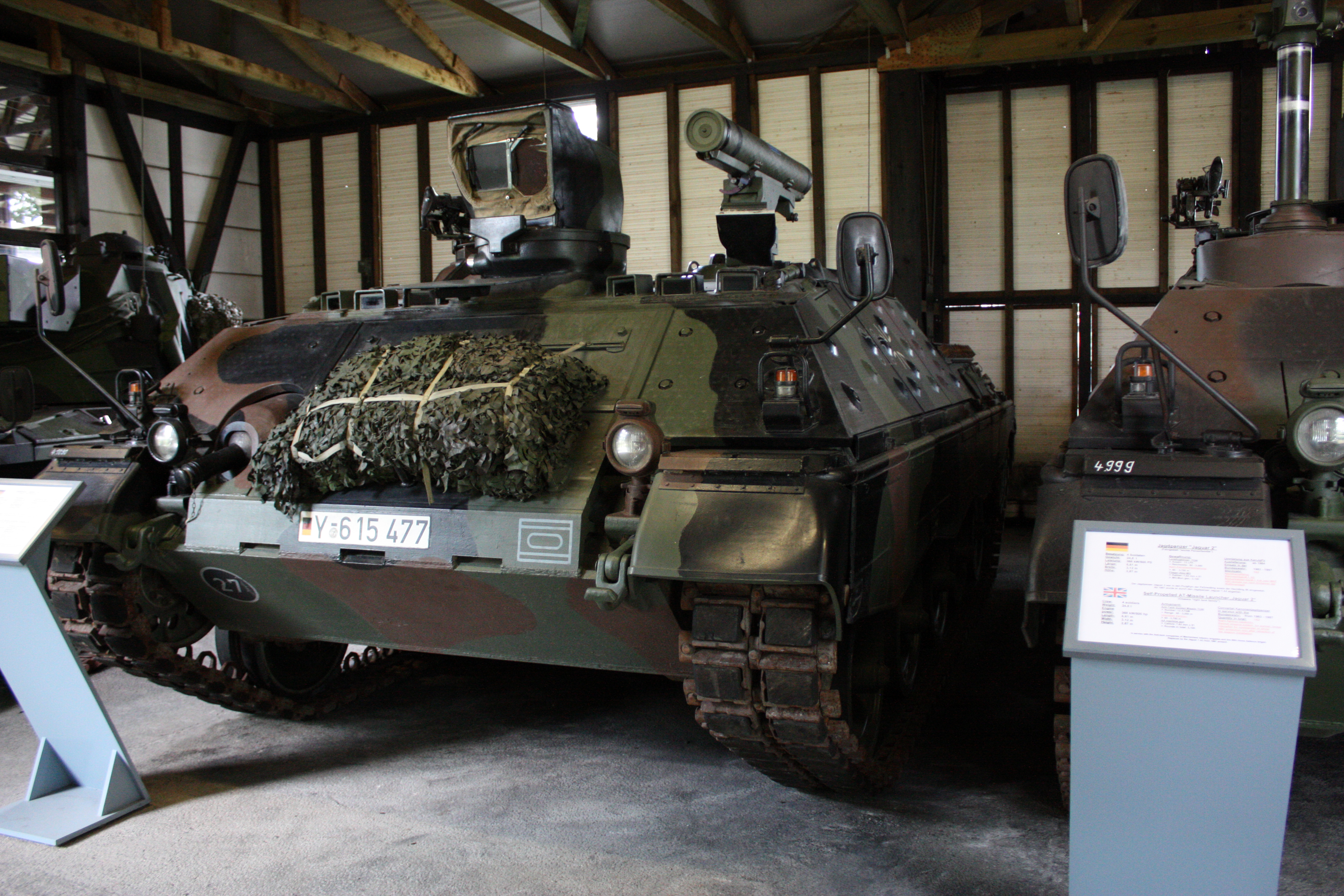
- Type: Anti-tank missile carrier
- Place of origin: West Germany

Service history
- In service: 1978–2005

Production history
- Produced: 1978–1982
- No. built: 316

Specifications
- Mass: 25.7 t
- Length: 6.61 m
- Width: 3.12 m
- Height: 2.55 m
- Crew: 4 (commander, gunner, loader, driver)
- Armor: 50 mm
- Main armament: 1× HOT ATGM drum missile launcher with autoloader, 20 missiles
- Secondary armament: 2× 7.62mm MG3 machine guns 8× smoke dischargers
- Engine: 29,4l MTU MB 837 Aa V8 water-cooled multi-fuel diesel-engine 500 hp (368 kW)
- Suspension: torsion bar
- Operational range: 380 km
- Maximum speed: 70 km/h

The Raketenjagdpanzer (RakJPz 3) Jaguar 1 was a West German tank destroyer equipped with anti-tank guided missiles. From 1978 to 1982, 316 obsolete Raketenjagdpanzer 2 units were converted into Jaguar 1s by replacing the SS.11 missile system with a HOT launcher and upgrading the armour. From 1993 to 1995, new optics and a thermal imaging system were added to create the Jaguar 1A3.

== See also ==
- M150, U.S. equivalent
