= 512th Heavy Panzerjäger Battalion =

- German: Schwere Panzerjäger-Abteilung 512
- Active: 15 February 1945 – May 1945
- Country: Germany
- Branch: Heer ( Wehrmacht)
- Type: Tank destroyer unit
- Size: Battalion
- Equipment: Ferdinand and Jagdtiger tank destroyers
- Engagements: World War II

The 512th Heavy Panzerjäger Battalion (German: Schwere Panzerjäger-Abteilung 512) was an independent tank destroyer battalion of the German Wehrmacht during World War II.

Formed and organised during the winter of 1944 to 1945, it was active in February. It was one of only two battalions equipped with Jagdtiger tank destroyers, and served exclusively on the Western Front.

== Formation ==
The battalion was formed at Döllersheim and deployment preparations were ordered on 15 February 1945. The 512th was formed from elements of the veteran 424th Heavy Panzer Battalion. The 424th, previously numbered the 501st, had been one of the first German heavy tank battalions to be formed, and had fought in Africa and on the Eastern Front.

It received its first Jagdtigers on 16 February; by 13 March, it had been brought up to a strength of 20 vehicles in two companies, with the 3rd Company made up of personnel transferred from the 511th Heavy Panzer Battalion.

The Jagdtiger was the heaviest armoured fighting vehicle produced during the war, mounting a 128 mm main gun inside a 79-tonne chassis. It was only produced in very small numbers - around 80 were built - and would only be issued to two units; the 512th and the 653rd Heavy Panzerjäger Battalion.

== Operations ==
The commander of the unit's second company was Oberleutnant (Lieutenant) Otto Carius, one of the most successful German tank commanders of the war.

On 10 March 1945, the battalion was assigned to LIII Corps and committed to the Battle of Remagen with the 653rd Heavy Panzerjäger Battalion. Illustrating the difficulties German forces faced in getting their heavy armor to the front, it took ten days to bring the first five Jagdtigers of the 512th Heavy Panzerjäger Battalion's 2nd Company to the front due to communications breakdowns and the constantly-worrying threat from Allied fighter-bombers. The 1st Company lost four Jagdtigers in rearguard combat actions, three of which were due to mechanical breakdowns rather than from enemy action.

They finally engaged the attacking American armor around Herborn to prevent American armor from fully exploiting the capture of the Remagen bridgehead. Among the German casualties was Leutnant Sepp Tarlach's machine belonging to the second platoon of the 1st Company, which was abandoned in Obernetphen and subsequently captured. On 9 April, the US 750th Tank Battalion claimed another near Offensen which was later photographed after being pushed off a road to clear the path ahead. A catastrophic internal explosion ripped the vehicle's roof off. The battalion then fought its last battle near Paderborn against the 3rd Armored Division in mid-April 1945 before finally capitulating to US forces. At least one vehicle of the battalion was lost to combat action by the US 3rd Armored Division on 1 April.

In May 1945, the short-lived fighting unit surrendered to the US 99th Infantry Division in Iserlohn. The German surrender was filmed and photographed, in which the Jagdtigers and other military vehicles as well as their crews were shown forming up in the town square for Allied inspection prior to being disarmed and passing into captivity.

== Sources ==
=== Literature ===
- Zaloga, Steven (2015). Armored Champion: The Top Tanks of World War II. Mechanicsburg, PA: Stackpole Books. ISBN 978-0-8117-1437-2.
- Wilbeck, Christopher (2004). Sledgehammers: Strengths and Flaws of Tiger Tank Battalions in World War II. The Aberjona Press, U.S.A. ISBN 978-0-9717-6502-3.
- Forty, George (2008). Tiger Tank Battalions in World War II. Zenith Press. ISBN 978-0-7603-3049-4.
