= Panzer VIII Maus =

WWII German super-heavy tank

Panzerkampfwagen VIII Maus
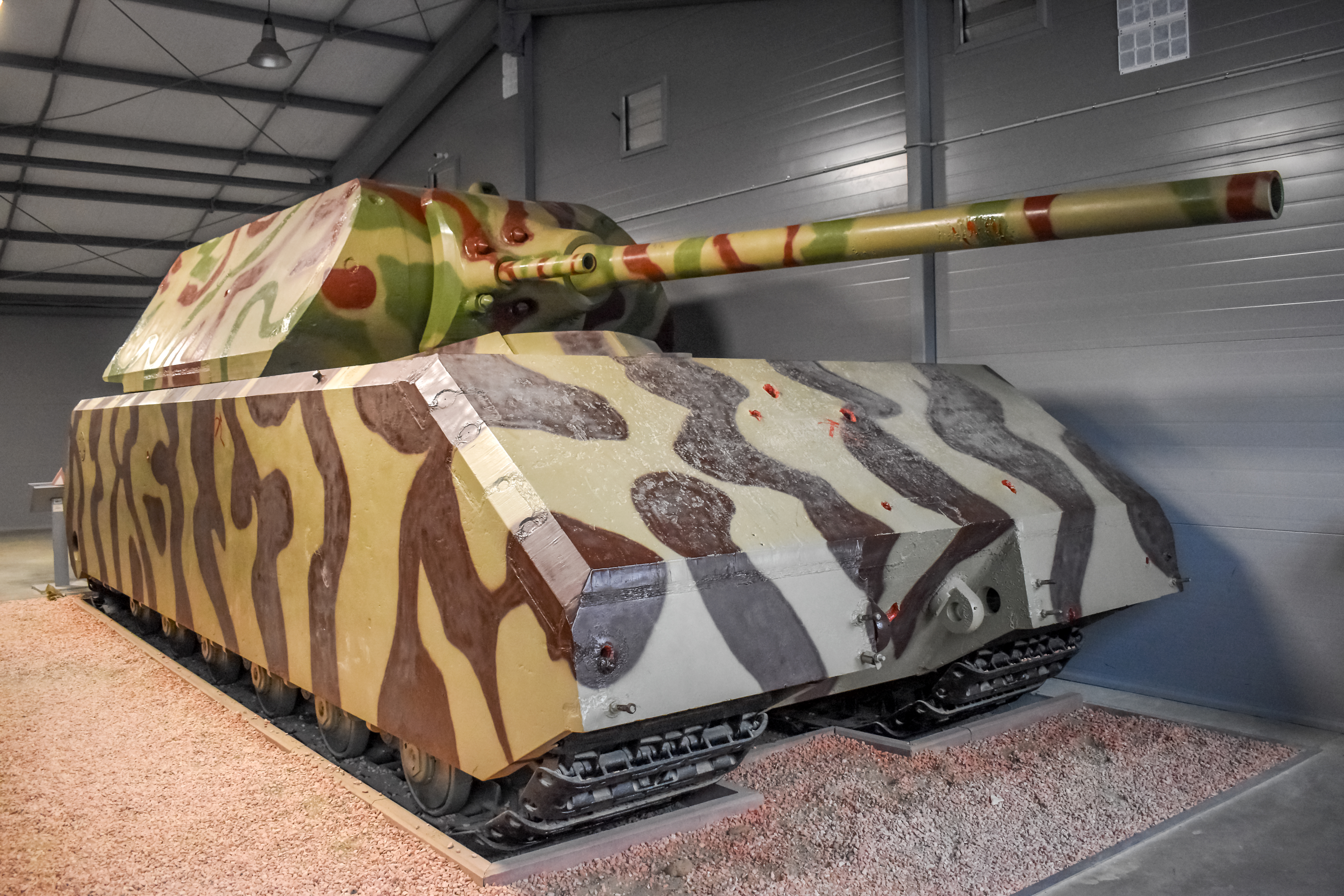
- The Maus hull:Version1 turret:Version2 prototype at the Kubinka Tank Museum, Russia (2025)
- Type: Super-heavy tank
- Place of origin: Nazi Germany

Service history
- Used by: Nazi Germany
- Wars: World War II (Never saw combat)

Production history
- Designer: Ferdinand Porsche
- Designed: 1941
- Manufacturer: Ferdinand Porsche, Krupp, Alkett
- Unit cost: ~800,000 ℛ︁ℳ︁
- Produced: spanned from 1942 through 1944
- No. built: 2 (of which 1 incomplete)
- Variants: V1, V2

Specifications
- Mass: 188 t (207 short tons; 185 long tons)
- Length: 10.2 m (33 ft 6 in)
- Width: 3.71 m (12 ft 2 in)
- Height: 3.63 m (11 ft 11 in)
- Crew: 6 (commander, gunner, 2 loaders, driver, radio operator/bow gunner)
- Armour: 220 mm (8.7 in) (turret front); 200 mm (7.9 in) (turret side and rear); 200 mm (7.9 in) (hull front); 180 mm (7.1 in) (hull side); 150 mm (5.9 in) (hull rear)
- Main armament: 128 mm (5 in) KwK 44 gun L/55 (68 rounds)
- Secondary armament: 75 mm (3 in) KwK 44 gun L/36.5 (co-axial, 100 rounds); 7.92 mm (0.31 in) MG 34 machine gun (co-axial, 1,000 rounds)
- Engine: (V1) MB509 V12 petrol engine, DB 603 derivative; (V2) MB 517 V12 diesel engine; (V1) 1,080 hp (805 kW); (V2) 1,200 hp (895 kW)
- Power/weight: 6.4 HP/ton
- Transmission: electric transmission
- Suspension: a unique external bogie suspension system
- Ground clearance: 500 mm (20 in)
- Fuel capacity: 2,700 L (590 imp gal; 710 U.S. gal) (internal fuel tank); 1,500 L (330 imp gal; 400 U.S. gal) (external fuel tank)
- Operational range: 160 km (99 mi) (road); 62 km (39 mi) (off-road)
- Maximum speed: 20 km/h (12 mph) (maximum); 18 km/h (11 mph) (average road speed); 16 km/h (9.9 mph) (average off-road speed)

Panzerkampfwagen VIII Maus (English: 'mouse') was a German World War II super-heavy tank completed in July of 1944. It is the heaviest fully enclosed armored fighting vehicle ever built. Five were ordered, but only two hulls and one turret were completed; the turret being attached before the testing grounds were captured by the Soviet military.

These two prototypes underwent trials in late 1944. The complete vehicle was 10.2 m (33 ft) long, 3.71 m (12.2 ft) wide and 3.63 m (11.9 ft) high. Weighing about 188 metric tons, the tank's main armament was the Krupp-designed 128 mm KwK 44 L/55 gun, based on the 12.8 cm Pak 44 towed anti-tank gun also used in the casemate-type Jagdtiger tank destroyer, with a coaxial 75 mm KwK 44 L/36.5 gun. The 128 mm gun was powerful enough to destroy all Allied armored fighting vehicles in service at the time, with some at ranges exceeding 3,500 m (3,800 yd).

The principal problem in the design of the Maus was developing an engine and drivetrain powerful enough to adequately propel the tank, yet small enough to fit inside it – it was meant to use a "hybrid drive", an internal-combustion engine to operate an electric generator to power its tracks with electric motor units, much as its Porsche-designed predecessors, the VK 30.01 (P), VK 45.01 (P), and Elefant had. The drivetrain was electrical, designed to provide a maximum speed of 20 km/h (12 mph) and a minimum speed of 1.5 km/h (0.9 mph). However, during actual field testing, the maximum speed achieved on hard surfaces was 13 km/h (8.1 mph) with full motor field, achieved an average speed of 16 km/h off-road during Böblingen proving ground trials, and by weakening the motor field to a minimum, a top speed of 22 km/h (14 mph) was achieved. The vehicle's weight made it unable to use most bridges; instead it was intended to ford to a depth of 2 m (6.6 ft) or submerge up to a depth of 8 m (26 ft) and use a snorkel to cross rivers.

== Development ==
The development of the Maus originates from a contract given to Porsche for the design of a 100-ton tank in March 1942. Porsche's design, known as the VK 100.01 / Porsche Type 205, was shown to Adolf Hitler in June 1942, who subsequently approved it. Work on the design began in earnest; the first prototype, to be ready in 1943 was initially to receive the name Mammut ('mammoth'). This was reportedly changed to Mäuschen ('little mouse') in December 1942 and finally to Maus ('mouse') in February 1943, which became the most common name for this tank.

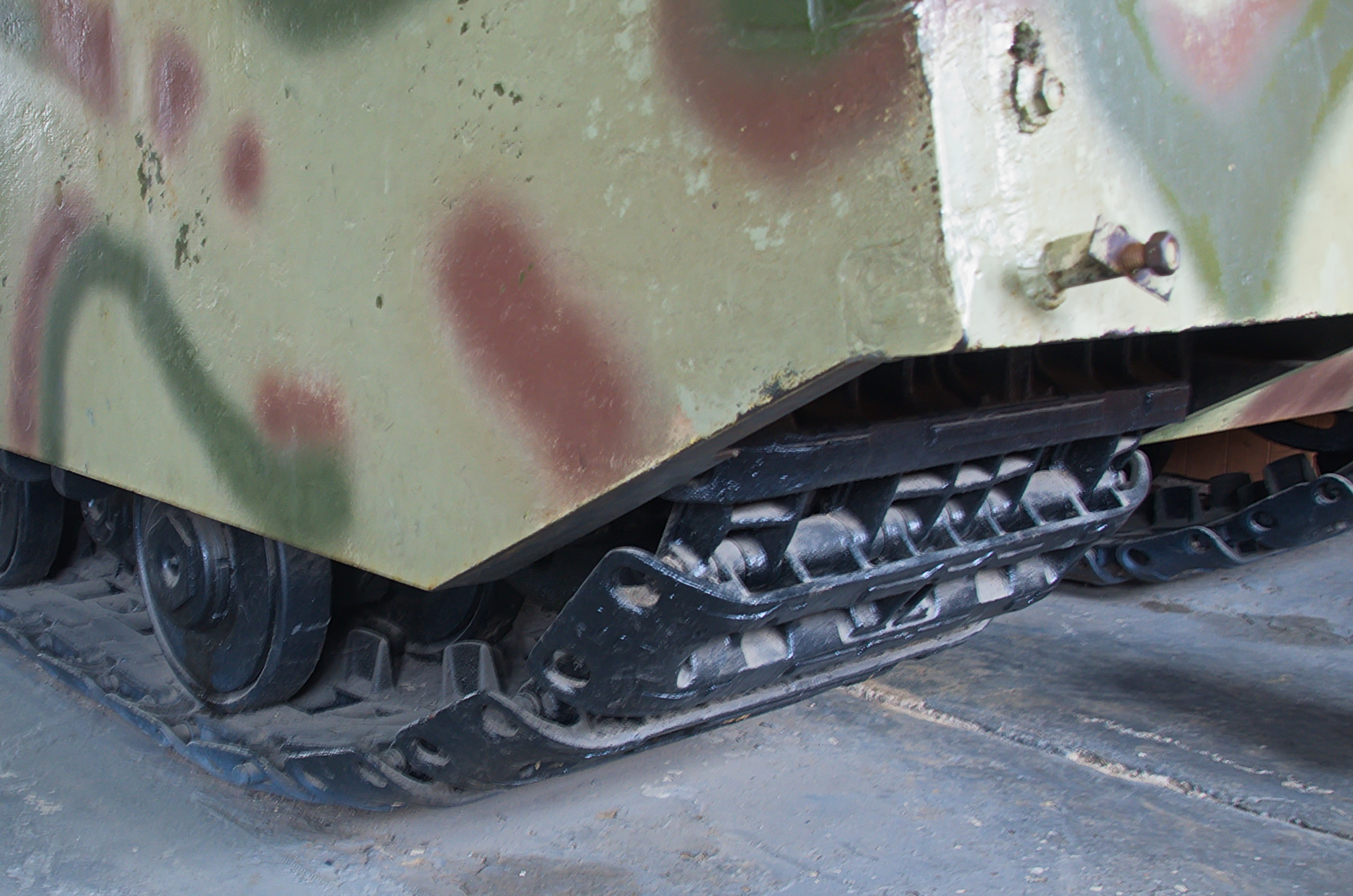
The "contact-shoe" and "connector-link" track design of the suspension system for the Maus

The Maus was designed from the start to use the "electric transmission" design which Ferdinand Porsche had used in the VK 45.01 (P), his unsuccessful attempt to win the production contract for the Tiger. The initial powerplant was the Daimler-Benz MB 509 gasoline engine, an adaptation of Germany's largest displacement (at 44.5 L (2,720 cu in)) inverted V12 aircraft engine, the Daimler-Benz DB 603 petrol engine, and later changed to the Daimler-Benz MB 517 diesel engine. This drove an electrical generator, and their combined length occupied the central/rear two-thirds of the Maus' hull, cutting off the forward driver's compartment in the hull from direct access to the turret from within the tank. Each 1.1-meter-wide track, which used the same basic "contact shoe" and "connector link" design format as the Henschel Tiger II, was driven by its own electric motor mounted within the upper rear area of each hull side. Each set of tracks had a suspension design containing a total of 24 road wheels per side, in six bogie sets, staggered to be spread over the entire width of the track.

Due to the return "run" of the uniquely 110 cm-wide tracks used being completely enclosed within the fixed outer side armor panels that defined its overall hull width, with the inner vertical lengthwise walls of the hull used to mount the suspension components, a narrow lengthwise "tub" remained between the hull's inner armored walls, under and to the rear of the turret to house the engine and generator of the tank's powertrain.

The armor was substantial: the hull front was 220 mm (8.7 in) thick, the sides and rear of the hull were up to 190 mm (7.5 in). The turret armor was even thicker, the turret front was up to 240 mm (9.4 in) and the sides and rear 200 mm (7.9 in). The gun mantlet was 250 mm (9.8 in), and combined with the turret armor behind, the protection level at that section was even higher.

The initial plan for the Maus was for the prototype to have been completed by mid-1943, with monthly production scheduled to run at ten vehicles per month after delivery of the prototype. The work on the Maus would be divided between Krupp, responsible for the chassis, armament and turret and Alkett, who would be responsible for final assembly.

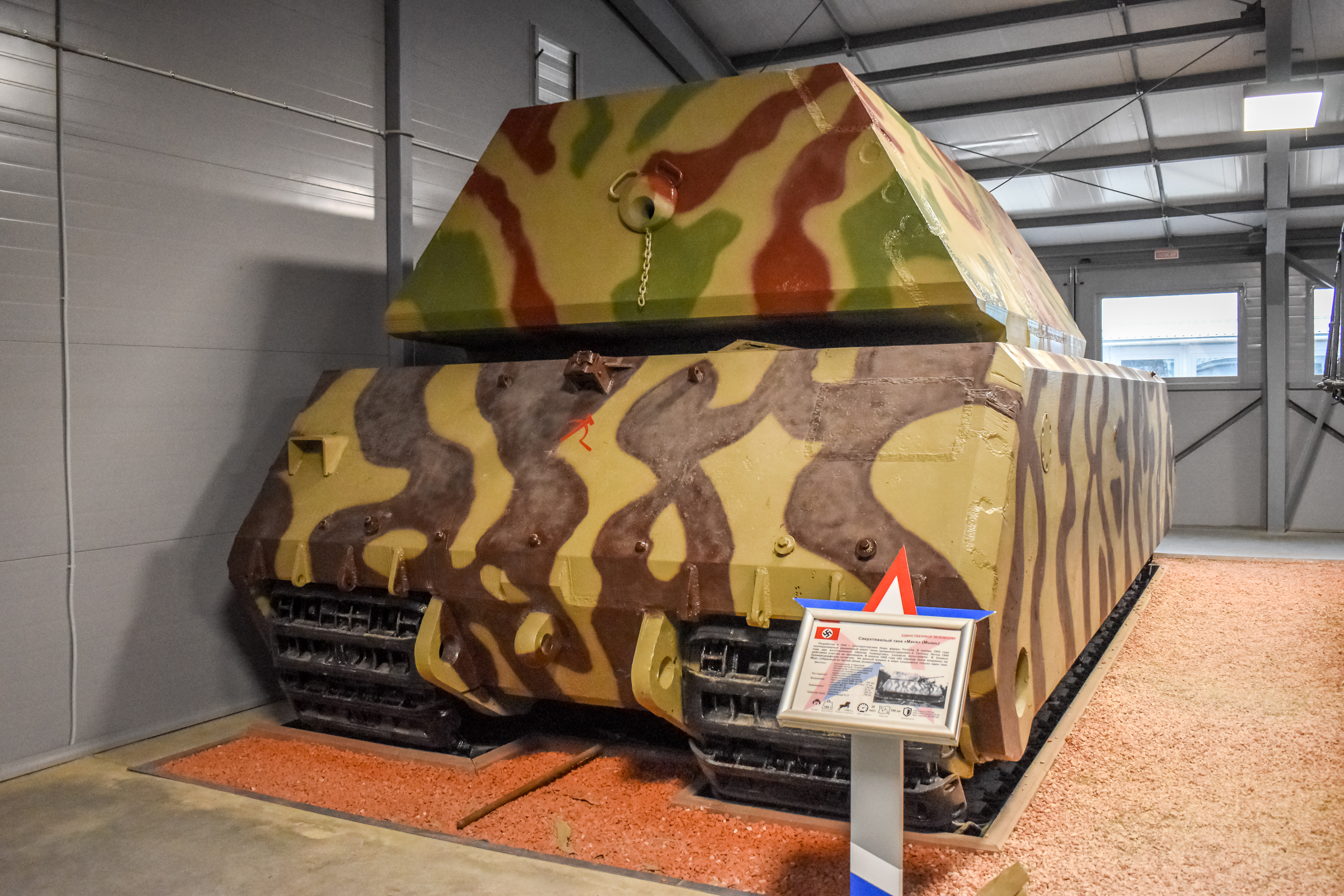
The rear of the Maus in the Kubinka tank museum

The Maus tank was originally designed to weigh approximately 100 tons and be armed with a 128 mm main gun and a 75 mm co-axial secondary gun. Additional armament options were studied including various versions of 128 mm, 150 mm, and 170 mm guns. In January 1943 Hitler himself insisted that the armament be a 128 mm main gun with a coaxial 75 mm gun. The 128 mm PaK 44 anti-tank field artillery piece of 1943 that Krupp adapted for arming the Maus as the Kampfwagenkanone (KwK) 44 retained, in parallel to the Porsche project, its original anti-tank Panzerabwehrkanone family designation of PaK 44 when mounted in the casemate-style Jagdtiger tank destroyer.

By May 1943, a wooden mockup of the final Maus configuration was ready and presented to Hitler, who approved it for mass production, ordering a first series of 150. At this point, the estimated weight of the Maus was 188 tons.

In his book Panzer Leader, Heinz Guderian wrote:

On 1 May a wooden model of the "Maus", a tank project of Porsche and Krupp, was shown to Hitler. It was intended to mount a 150 mm gun. The total weight of the tank was supposed to reach 175 ton. It should be considered that after the design changes on Hitler's instructions the tank will weigh 200 ton. The model didn't have a single machine gun for close combat, and for this reason they had to reject it. It had the same design flaw that made the Elefant unsuitable for close combat. In the end, the tank will inevitably have to wage a close combat since it operates in cooperation with the infantry. An intense debate started, and except for me, all of the present found the "Maus" magnificent. It was promising to be exactly that, a "giant".

This lack of close combat armament was later addressed with the addition of a Nahverteidigungswaffe (short-range defensive ordnance) mounted in the turret roof, a 7.92 mm (0.31 in) MG 34 machine gun with 1,000 rounds mounted coaxially with the main weapons in the turret, and three pistol ports for submachine guns in the sides and rear of the turret. Future planned modifications included provisions for a MG 151/20 cannon for anti-aircraft defense mounted in the turret roof.

=== V1 ===
The first, turretless prototype (V1) was assembled by Alkett in December 1943. Tests started the same month, with a mockup turret fitted of the same weight as the real turret. In June 1944 the production turret, with armament, was used for tests.

The Maus was too heavy to cross bridges. As a result, an alternative system was developed, where the Maus would instead ford the rivers it needed to cross. Due to its size, it could ford relatively deep streams, but for deeper ones it was to submerge and drive across the river bottom. The solution required tanks to be paired up. One Maus would supply electrical power to the crossing vehicle via a cable until it reached the other side. The crew would receive air through a large snorkel, which was long enough for the tank to go 8 m (26 ft) under water.

=== V2 ===
In March 1944 the second prototype, the V2, was delivered. It differed in many details from the V1 prototype. In mid-1944, the V2 prototype was fitted with a powerplant and the first produced Maus turret. This turret was fitted with a 128 mm KwK 44 L/55 gun, a coaxial 75 mm KwK 44 L/36.5 gun and a coaxial 7.92 mm MG 34. The V1 prototype was supposed to be fitted with the second-produced turret, but this never happened.

By July 1944, Krupp was in the process of producing four more Maus hulls, but they were ordered to halt production and scrap these. Krupp stopped all work on it in August 1944. Meanwhile, the V2 prototype started tests in September 1944, fitted with a Daimler-Benz MB 517 diesel engine, new electric steering system and a Skoda Works-designed running gear and tracks.

There was also a special railroad carriage made for transporting the Maus prototypes. This was the main cause of its demise, because of the lack of transportation methods due to its immense weight.

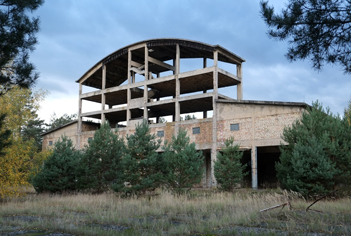
Hall for the Maus on the New Verskraft, Army Experimental Station Kummersdorf, 2013

== Capture ==
After the war, the commander of Soviet armored and mechanized troops ordered the hull of V1 to mount the V2's turret. The Soviets used six FAMO-built Sd.Kfz. 9 18t half-tracks, the largest of Germany's half-track vehicles built until May 1945, to pull the 55-ton turret off the destroyed hull. The resulting vehicle was then sent back to the USSR for further testing and is now at the Kubinka Tank Museum.

A gunsight intended for the wooden mock-up turret was captured by British forces. It is now in the collection of The Tank Museum at Bovington, UK.

== Completion and testing ==
The test program for the Maus was established by Wa Prüf 6 and engineer Zadnik from Porsche on November 1, 1943. It consisted of a factory test by Porsche, a road test at the Kummersdorf motor vehicle testing site, submersion and towing tests at Porsche, and firing tests at the Army Testing Center in Hillersleben. While at Alkett, the first chassis received a replacement weight of 55 tons in place of the turret, which was not yet available.

Contrary to the instructions from Reichs-Minister of Armaments and War Production Albert Speer, who insisted on personal approval for every test drive, the Maus was driven for the first time on December 24, 1942, by Porsche driver Karl Gensberg, who drove it out of the hall and back at the Alkett company site in Berlin. After the first successful test drive at Alkett, the Maus underwent its first tests at the Army Testing Center Kummersdorf near Berlin. Due to repeated necessary repairs and adjustments, issues with spare parts supply, and heavy bomb attacks in northern Germany, it was decided to conduct further tests near the Porsche factory on the grounds of the tank barracks in Böblingen. The tank replacement unit 7 was stationed in the Hindenburg Barracks. The vehicle 205/1 was transported by rail to Böblingen starting January 11, 1944, and arrived on January 14, as the specialized railway transport wagon for heavy loads with 14 axles was not allowed to pass through tunnels or over railway bridges.

Comprehensive driving tests were then carried out in the tank barracks area, with reports being written regularly. The vehicle 205/1, with the replacement weight, was given a three-color camouflage paint scheme in March.

Without the engine and turret, the second chassis, 205/2, arrived in Böblingen in tow on March 10, 1944, coming from Alkett in a towable condition. The turret, still without the two guns, arrived on May 3, 1944. After the guns were installed, it was first assembled on June 9, 1944, by mechanics from Krupp. Around October 1944, the new diesel engine MB 517 arrived in Böblingen and was immediately installed into vehicle 205/2. Photos show that the only available turret was then mounted on the second chassis, and the entire vehicle was given a three-color camouflage paint scheme. The vehicle was made ready for operation and armed, and it was immediately relocated to VersKraft neu in Kummersdorf. Vehicle 205/1, with the replacement weight, was also relocated there. Further tests took place at the Krupp shooting range in Meppen. After the war, three Maus hulls and turrets were found there. They were likely used for firing trials.

== Disposition after the end of the war ==
By the end of April 1945, both prototypes were located at the Army testing grounds in Kummersdorf. The Maus 205/2 was ultimately blown up by the German side at the site of the main camp in Zossen, specifically at Hindenburgplatz in Wünsdorf. It is possible that the vehicle was intended for the defense of the OKH headquarters. The explosion threw the turret off, and practically destroyed the lower hull.

The Maus 205/1, which was left behind at the Kummersdorf firing range and still equipped with the replacement turret, was also damaged by an explosion inside, but remained externally intact. Both vehicles were captured by the Red Army, and the turret from Maus 205/2 was mounted onto the hull of Maus 205/1.

On May 4, 1946, the vehicle was sent to Kubinka for testing purposes. After the completion of the tests in 1951, all components were removed for examination, leaving behind a vehicle without any internal equipment. After being left outdoors for many years, the vehicle has been on display at the Kubinka Tank Museum since 1978. In 2000, the vehicle was given the original camouflage paint of prototype 205/2.

== Military significance ==
The Panzerkampfwagen VIII Maus was conceived not as a vehicle for mobile warfare or Blitzkrieg-style operations, but as a specialized breakthrough tank (Durchbruchspanzer) designed to assault heavily fortified defensive positions. Its intended doctrine was analogous to that of the Tiger I heavy tank battalions: transported by rail to a point near the front, used to break through prepared defensive lines, and then withdrawn for maintenance rather than exploiting breakthroughs at speed.

Ferdinand Porsche himself described the vehicle as a "mobile bunker" (fahrender Bunker), a designation that accurately reflected its design priorities: maximum armor protection and firepower at the expense of speed and operational range. The 128 mm KwK 44 L/55 main gun was capable of destroying any Allied or Soviet armored vehicle at ranges exceeding 3,500 meters, effectively outranging most contemporary anti-tank systems.

The Böblingen proving ground trials of January–June 1944 demonstrated that the vehicle was capable of completing any maneuver the Panther tank could perform, with the exception of matching its top speed. It crossed a 0.72-meter wall and a 4.5-meter wide trench, and achieved an average speed of 16 km/h with a cruising range of 190 km on the external fuel tank. The Anglo-American commission that reviewed the trial results described the tests as "highly successful."

The program was cancelled in July 1944 primarily as a result of Allied bombing of the Krupp factories in Essen, which destroyed the industrial capacity necessary for production, rather than as a result of any fundamental design.

== See also ==
- List of prototype World War II combat vehicles
- Panzerkampfwagen E-100 – German 150 tonne super-heavy tank design, largest of the Entwicklung series "replacement" German AFVs
- Landkreuzer P. 1000 Ratte – German 1,000 tonne armoured landcruiser design

=== Tanks of comparable role, performance and era ===
- American T28 super-heavy tank – prototype casemate-hull tank destroyer, two prototypes completed
- British Tortoise heavy assault tank – super-heavy tank destroyer
- Soviet IS-4 – known as Object 701, prototype heavy tank with 122 mm gun
