= 653rd Heavy Panzerjäger Battalion =

- German: Schwere Panzerjäger-Abteilung 653
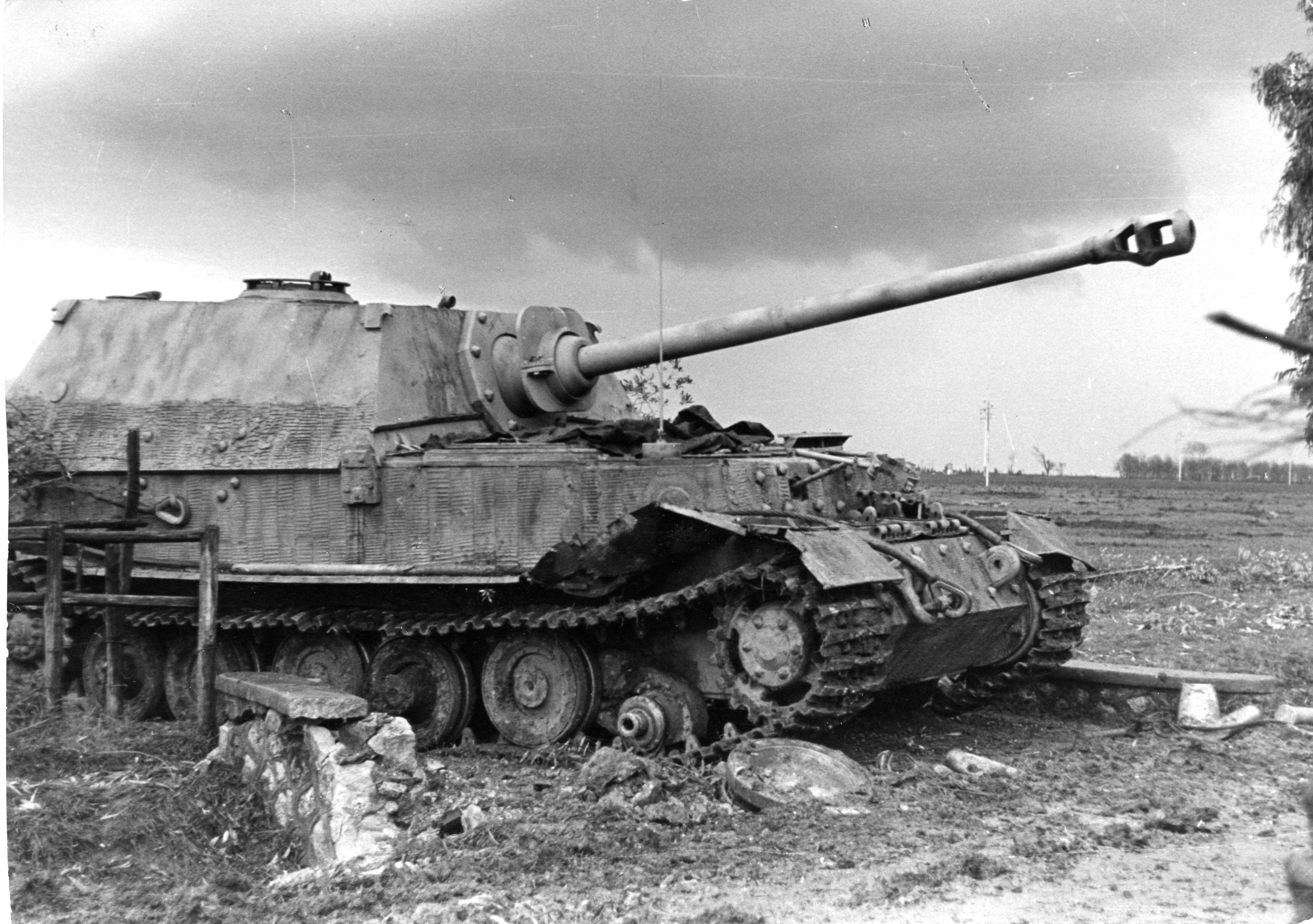
- A disabled Elefant - probably of the 653rd - in Italy, April 1944
- Active: 1 April 1943
- Country: Germany
- Branch: Wehrmacht
- Type: Tank destroyer unit
- Equipment: Ferdinand and Jagdtiger tank destroyers
- Engagements: World War II

The 653rd Heavy Panzerjäger Battalion (German: Schwere Panzerjäger-Abteilung 653) was a tank destroyer unit of the German Wehrmacht active during World War II. It was equipped with Ferdinand and later Jagdtiger tank destroyers. Elements of the battalion served on the Eastern, Western, and Italian fronts between 1943 and 1945.

== Eastern Front ==
The battalion was formed on 1 April 1943, by the redesignation of the 197th Sturmgeschütz Battalion. The latter was an assault gun battalion which had been formed in 1940, later seeing service during the Invasion of Yugoslavia and on the Eastern Front.

The 653rd was initially equipped with Ferdinand panzerjager, which mounted a powerful 88 mm gun. The first vehicles arrived in May. The battalion was 1,000 men strong. The crews trained for several weeks on the vehicles at the Nibelungenwerk factory in Austria. Crews even assisted with the final assembly. According to documents at the German Federal Archives, a fully equipped battalion was assigned 45 Ferdinands but only 40 were delivered before its first operation. General Heinz Guderian visited the battalion and observed field exercises. By 4 July 1943 the unit had 45 Ferdinands (out of a total of 90 produced) and small contingent of other vehicles. Major Heinrich Steinwachs was given command of the battalion, which included nine staff officers and a maintenance unit plus three companies of combat personnel.

It was assigned to the XXXXI Panzer Corps, and fought at the Battle of Kursk in July 1943 and the subsequent Soviet counterattack. From the 5 to 27 July German archives recorded the 653rd claimed 320 tanks and self-propelled guns and a large number of anti-tank guns and motor vehicles for 24 killed in action, 126 wounded and 13 vehicles destroyed.

A situation report sent by the commanding officer to the headquarters of the 2nd Panzer Army on 24 July reported the status of the unit. It had 45 Ferdinand with 25 operational and 41 Sturmpanzer with 18 of those combat ready. Steinwachs reported that the operational vehicles were "on their last legs" and recommended their withdrawal and the unit to be disbanded and dispersed to maintenance units. He suggested forming some small groups 5 to 8 kilometres behind the front to act as a local mobile reserve, to be reinforced via the maintenance company when necessary.

In August, it fought and around Nikopol during the Battle of the Dnieper as the 1st battalion of the 656th Regiment. On 25 November 1943 the 653rd battalion claimed its 600th tank destroyed; 44 that day. A Leutnant Kreschmer was credited with 21.

== Italian theater ==
After heavy losses in Ukraine, the battalion was withdrawn to Vienna to refit. Starting on 2 January 1944 until April, the tank destroyers received upgrades—the most externally visible ones being 1) the addition of Zimmerit anti-magnetic paste, 2) an upgraded commander's cupola, 3) re-designed armored engine grates and 4) an MG34 station to the right front of the hull. The 1st Company was issued the first 11 completed vehicles and was sent south to Italy where it fought at the Battle of Anzio in February 1944. The 2nd and 3rd companies were equipped with 30 new vehicles in April and sent to the Eastern Front, where they were attached to the XXIV Panzer Corps.

By August, the 2nd and 3rd were reduced to twelve vehicles between them; these were withdrawn to refit in Kraków, where they were combined into the 2nd Company. It remained on the Eastern Front, as part of 17th Army, and was redesignated the 614th Heavy Panzerjäger Company. It would see out the rest of the war fighting the Soviet Army, with two Elefants surviving until the Battle of Berlin in May 1945.

== Western Front ==
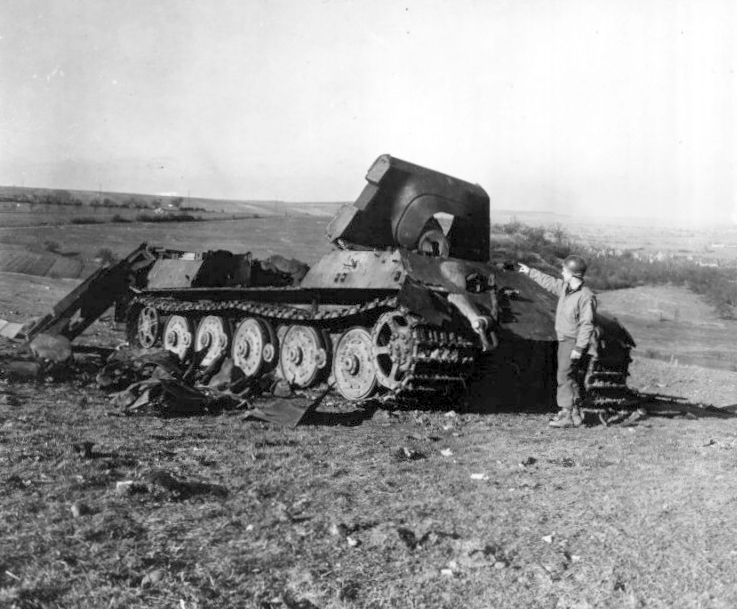
The gutted wreck of a destroyed Jagdtiger of the 653rd's 1st Company in Lorraine, France, in January 1945.

The 3rd Company, meanwhile, returned west to rejoin the 1st Company, which had withdrawn to Vienna with only four operational Elefants. In September, both companies were issued with newly-fielded Jagdtiger heavy tank destroyers. The Jagdtiger was the heaviest armoured fighting vehicle produced during the war, mounting a 12.8 cm Pak 44 main gun on a 72-tonne chassis. However, it was severely underpowered, having been equipped with an engine (Maybach HL230) originally designed for the 57-tonne Tiger I and which had already been found significantly inadequate even for that vehicle. It was only produced in very small numbers - around 80 were ever built - and the few manufactured would only be issued to two units, the 653rd and the 512th Heavy Panzerjäger Battalion.

Once re-equipped, the battalion was again split up, with the 1st Company assigned to the 15th Army on the northern flank of the German Ardennes Offensive and the 3rd assigned to the 17th SS Panzergrenadier Division Götz von Berlichingen to the south, where it would fight in Operation Nordwind in January. By February, the two companies had reunited at Landau in the Palatinate, and by the end of the month, they were reinforced to a strength of 41 Jagdtigers. In April, it fell back to Austria, from where it was to receive new vehicles from the Nibelungenwerk Factory, and finally reached its conclusion in the war under the command of Army Group Ostmark near Linz.
