= Hayao Miyazaki's Daydream Data Notes =

Series of manga and essays written by Hayao Miyazaki

- Cover of the collected Hayao Miyazaki's Daydream Data Notes (1997 edition)

宮崎駿の雑想ノート (Miyazaki Hayao no Zassō Nōto)
- Manga
- Written by: Hayao Miyazaki
- Published by: Dainippon Kaiga
- Magazine: Model Graphix
- Original run: November 1984 – November 1992
- Volumes: 1

Hayao Miyazaki's Daydream Data Notes (宮崎駿の雑想ノート, Miyazaki Hayao no Zassō Nōto) is the collective name for Hayao Miyazaki's annotated manga and illustrated essays he contributed, very sporadically, to the hobby magazine Model Graphix in the 1980s and early '90s. The name has also been translated into English as Hayao Miyazaki's Random Thoughts Notebook. Game designer Kazuma Kujo stated in a 2012 Retro Gamer article that the book served as inspiration during development of the 1996 video game Metal Slug.

== Development ==
The Daydream Notes began as private sketches that can be traced back to Miyazaki's earliest childhood. Born in 1941 he, like war babies all over Europe, drew almost exclusively planes, tanks and battleships.

...the truth is that I am happiest when I am writing about stupid airplanes and tanks in magazines like Model Graphix...

== Media ==
=== Magazine ===
Installments of Daydream Notes were irregularly printed. Episodes occasionally appeared in the November 1984 through May 1990 issues of the monthly magazine Model Graphix. Among them, The Age of the Flying Boat (飛行艇時代, Hikōtei Jidai) (later adapted into Porco Rosso) was released from March to May 1989 issues. Additionally, "The Pig Tiger" (豚の虎, Buta no Tora), was released from October to November 1992 issues. The serialization resumed in 1998 under the title Hayao Miyazaki's Delusion Notes (宮崎駿の妄想ノート, Miyazaki Hayao no Mōsō Nōto), and it was collected in 2002, with included "The Pig Tiger" sequels "The Return of Hans" (ハンスの帰還, Hans no Kikan), originally serialized from March to September 1994 issues, and "Tigers in the Mud" (泥まみれの虎, Doromamire no Tora) (a manga adaptation of Otto Carius's war memoir of the same name), originally serialized from December 1998 to May 1999 issues. Miyazaki published the manga series illustrating the life of Jiro Horikoshi, The Wind Rises (風立ちぬ, Kaze Tachinu) (later adapted into his film of the same name), in Model Graphix from April 2009 to January 2010 issues as a continuation of the Delusional Notes series.

=== Books ===
Selections from Daydream Notes have been bundled in book form, published by Dainippon Kaiga in December 1992. The first edition omitted The Age of the Flying Boat, which had appeared as a separate standalone volume in July. In August 1997 a revised and expanded edition was released by the same publisher.

The annotated manga "The Return of Hans" is not included in either edition but appears in a different collection, Tigers in the Mud: Hayao Miyazaki's Delusion Notes (泥まみれの虎 宮崎駿の妄想ノート, Doromamire no Tora Miyazaki Hayao no Mōsō Nōto), published by Dainippon Kaiga in August 2002.

The Wind Rises was collected into one volume by Dainippon Kaiga in October 2015.

==== Installments / Contents ====
1. Shirarezaru Kyojin no Mattei
2. Kōtetsu no Ikuji
3. Tahōtō no Deban
4. Noufu no Me
5. Ryū no Kōtetsu
6. Kyūshū Jōkū no Jūgōsakuki
7. Kōshahōtō
8. Q-ship
9. Anshōmaru Monogatari
10. London Jōkuu 1918-nen
11. Saihin Zensen
12. Hikōtei Jidai
13. Buta no Tora

=== Radio broadcast ===
In 1995, Miyazaki's Daydream Notes was turned into a series of radio broadcasts for Nippon Broadcasting System. When commenting on this dramatisation in an interview for Tokuma Shoten's Animage magazine, Miyazaki explains his political stance as an opponent of Japan's rearmament and contrasts this with his lifelong interests in war, military affairs and military hardware. He explains that he expresses this fascination by drawing the fantastical craft, which are then published in Model Graphix, a magazine for scale model creation. He said that he did his best drawings when he was serializing his manga Nausicaä, "After staying up till dawn drawing the last manga pages to meet the printer's deadline, I would draw these models the next day; each would take a week. ... In essence it is my hobby to draw seemingly real vehicles, it works as my psychological release valve."

== Bibliography ==
- McCarthy, Helen (2002) [1999], Hayao Miyazaki: Master of Japanese Animation, Berkeley, CA: Stone Bridge Press, ISBN 1-88065641-8, archived from the original on 2013-12-03.
- Miyazaki, Hayao (August 4, 2009), Starting Point 1979–1996, Viz Media, pp. 244–46, ISBN 978-1-4215-0594-7, archived from the original on August 28, 2014.
