= Panzerkampfwagen E-100 =

German super-heavy tank prototype

E-100
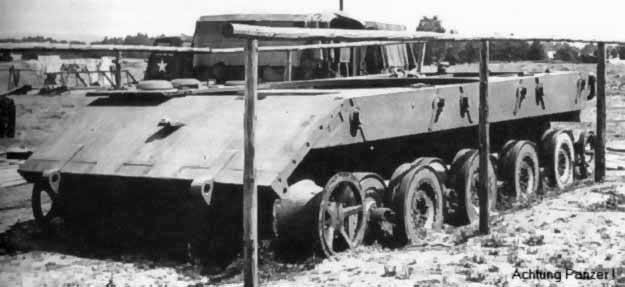
- E-100 Chassis
- Type: Super-heavy tank
- Place of origin: Nazi Germany

Production history
- Manufacturer: Henschel
- No. built: 1 partial prototype

Specifications (Planned)
- Mass: 140 metric tons
- Length: 11.07 m (36.3 ft) (w/ gun); 8.73 m (28.6 ft) (w/o gun)
- Width: 4.48 m (14.7 ft)
- Height: 3.38 m (11.1 ft)
- Crew: 6
- Armor: 150–200 mm (5.9–7.9 in) (hull front) 120 mm (4.7 in) (hull sides); 150 mm (5.9 in) (hull rear); 40 mm (1.6 in) (hull top); 80 mm (3.1 in) (hull bottom front); 40 mm (1.6 in) (hull bottom rear); 200 mm (7.9 in) (turret front); 80 mm (3.1 in) (turret sides); 150 mm (5.9 in) (turret rear) 40 mm (1.6 in) (turret top)
- Main armament: 128 mm KwK 44 L/55 gun
- Secondary armament: co-axial 75 mm KwK 44 L/24 gun 7.92mm MG34
- Engine: supercharged Maybach HL232, Maybach HL230 (prototype); 1,200 hp (890 kW), 700 hp (520 kW) (prototype)
- Transmission: Maybach Mekydro, Maybach OLVAR OG 40 12 16 B (8 forward and 4 reverse) (prototype), front drive sprockets
- Suspension: Independent coil springs, with dampers on the 1st, 2nd and 8th roadwheels
- Operational range: 160 km (99 mi) road 100 km (62 mi) cross-country
- Maximum speed: 40 km/h (25 mph), 23 km/h (14 mph) (prototype)

The Panzerkampfwagen E-100 (Gerät 383) (TG-01) was a German super-heavy tank design developed towards the end of World War II. It was the largest of the Entwicklung series of tank designs which was intended to improve German armored vehicle production through standardization on cheaper, simpler to build vehicles. By the end of the war, the chassis of the prototype E-100 had been partially completed; it was shipped to the United Kingdom for trials, but was later scrapped. The E-100 Prototype was said to be similar to the Panzerkampfwagen VIII (Maus).

== Development ==
The basic design was ordered by the Waffenamt as a parallel development to the Porsche Maus in June 1943. It was the heaviest of the Entwicklung (E) series of vehicles, meant to standardize as many components as possible, in the 100 ton weight class; other designs were the E-10, E-25, E-50, E-75.

In March 1944, the Adler company in Frankfurt submitted blueprint 021A38300 for a super-heavy tank called E-100, after the tank was proposed in April 1943 along with the other Entwicklung series vehicles. According to the blueprints, the tank would be armed with both the 12.8cm KwK L/55 gun based on the 12.8 cm Pak 44 towed anti-tank gun, and a coaxial 7.5 cm KwK 44 L/36.5 gun. Two types of engines were proposed: one was a 700 hp Maybach HL230, with a transmission and turning mechanism borrowed from the Tiger II. The estimated top speed was 23 km/h (14 mph). The second variant would have a new 1200 hp Maybach engine and a top speed estimated at 40 km/h (25 mph), with a new Maybach Mekydro transmission to handle the increased engine power. The design had removable side skirts and narrow transport tracks to make rail transport more viable. This design was very similar to the original 'Tiger-Maus' proposal, but had larger 900 mm (35 in) diameter road wheels and a new coil spring based suspension rather than the original torsion bars. A new turret was designed; intended to be simpler and lighter than the Maus turret. But many sources also suggest that a Maus turret could be mounted.

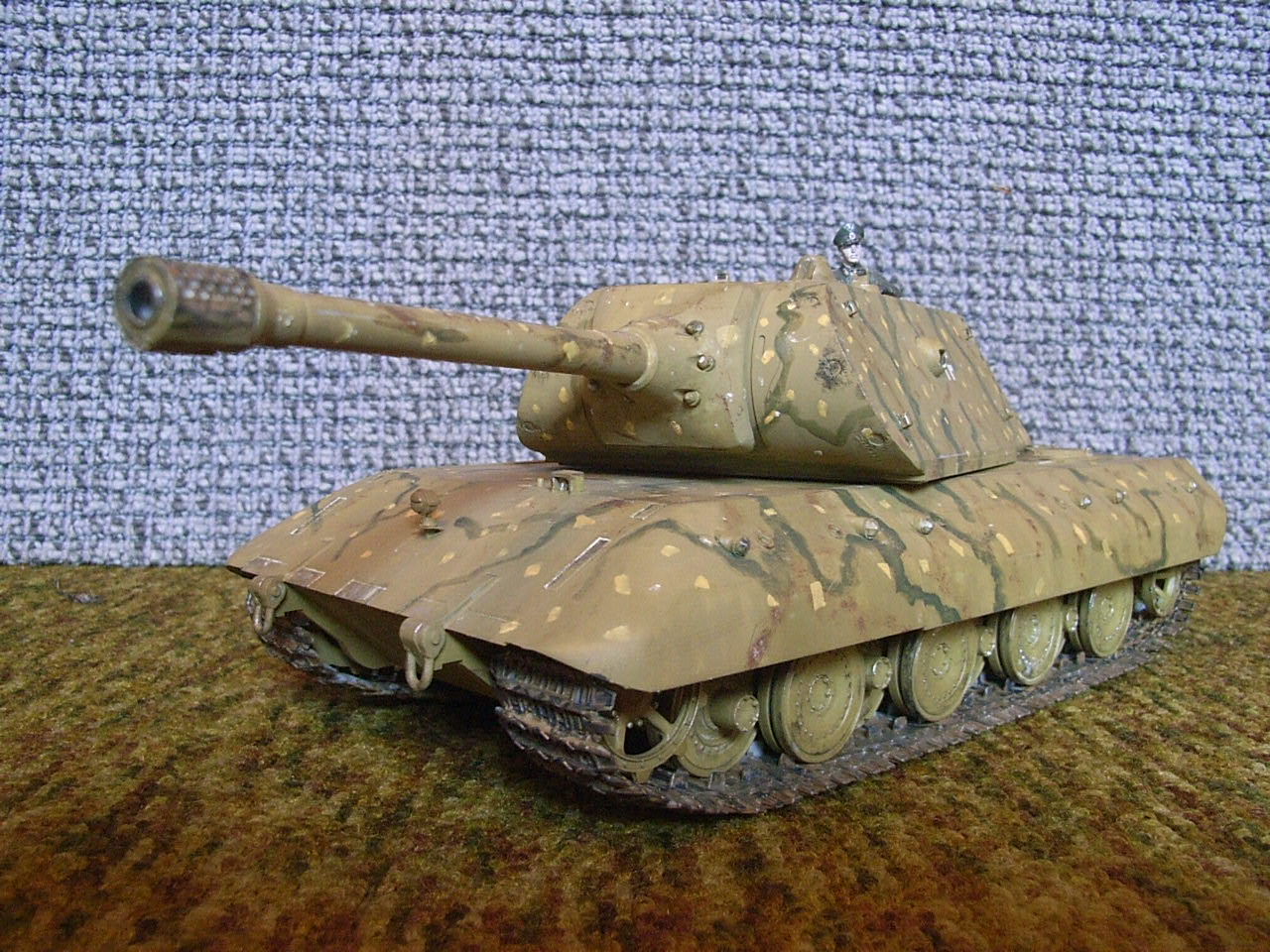
Model depicting one of the possible variants of E-100, using the Maus's turret.

In July 1944 Hitler ordered the development of super heavy tanks to stop. Work on the E-100 continued at a very low priority, with only three Adler employees available to assemble the prototype.

The first prototype was never fully completed and was found by the 751st Field Artillery Battalion of the American forces in April 1945. The partially completed vehicle was taken by the British Army for evaluation and then scrapped in the 1950s.

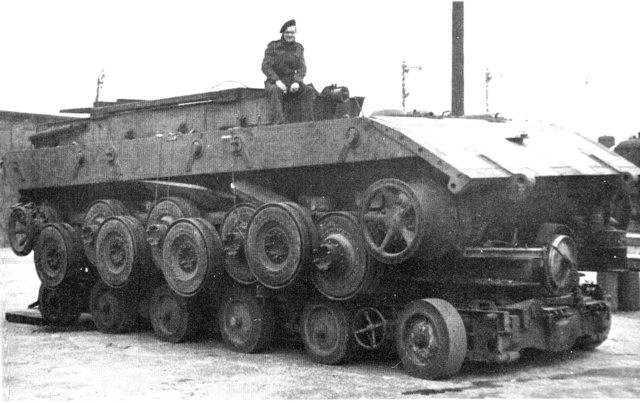
British forces captured the prototype in 1945, shown here on a trailer

== See also ==
- List of prototype World War II combat vehicles
- Entwicklung series
- Maus German 188 ton design, superior in terms of armor, but inferior in terms of mobility

=== Tanks of comparable role, performance and era ===
- American T30 Heavy Tank
- Soviet IS-7 post-war heavy tank

== Sources ==
- Chamberlain, Peter & Doyle, Hilary (1999) "Encyclopedia of German Tanks of World War Two"
