= Hikōtei Jidai =

Manga by Hayao Miyazaki

- Hikōtei Jidai volume cover
- Genre: Adventure
- Manga
- Written by: Hayao Miyazaki
- Published by: Dainippon Kaiga
- English publisher: Viz Media
- Magazine: Model Graphix
- English magazine: Animerica
- Original run: March 1989 – May 1989
- Volumes: 1
- Film adaptation
- Porco Rosso

Hikōtei Jidai (飛行艇時代; lit. 'The Age of the Flying Boat') is a manga by Hayao Miyazaki. A fifteen-page, all-watercolor work, it was published in Model Graphix, a monthly magazine about scale models, in three parts as a part of Hayao Miyazaki's Daydream Data Notes series. It was published in English as Crimson Pig: The Age of the Flying Boat in the Animerica magazine, July to September 1993 issues, translated by Matt Thor. Like other manga in this series, Hikōtei Jidai is a manifestation of Miyazaki's love for old planes. It is filled with aircraft from the 1920s (heavily modified by Miyazaki) and their technical details, as well as with the men (good-hearted and silly) who love them. The manga received a film adaptation by Miyazaki titled Porco Rosso in 1992.

Hikōtei Jidai was published as a book in July 1992 by Dainippon Kaiga. It has about sixty pages and includes the manga, several airplane vignettes, resin-kit models of aircraft, photos of some real counterparts of the floatplanes which appeared in the film, and some interviews with Miyazaki regarding airplane model kits. An expanded 72-page edition was published in 2004.

== Differences from Porco Rosso ==
Compared with the anime version, the manga is much more light-hearted. Other than being a "retired Italian Air Force pilot", Porco's past is not discussed, although the rise of fascism and the sentiment against it are mentioned. Gina doesn't appear at all, and Porco is much more lighthearted. Still, the basic story line and its charm are carried over into the anime.

For the dogfight between Porco and Donald Chuck (the character was renamed Donald Curtiss in the anime), Miyazaki wrote: "If this were animation, I might be able to convey the grandeur of this life-or-death battle. But this is a comic. I have no choice but to rely on the imagination of you, good readers." (At the time, the Porco Rosso anime had not yet been announced.)

Mamma Aiuto, who Porco saves in Part One, is also the name of a seaplane pirate gang in the movie. It is also Italian for "Help, mom!"

== The story ==
It's the 1920s over the Adriatic Sea. Air pirates with their seaplanes plague the sea, attacking ships, robbing money, and kidnapping women. Enter an Italian bounty hunter, Porco Rosso. Flying his red seaplane, he is the best in the business. He is a very dashing fellow and women love him. There is, however, one peculiarity about him—he is a pig. The story is separated into three parts:

Part One

Porco Rosso saves a girl from the air pirates, the Mamma Aiuto gang.

Part Two

Porco is shot down by an American, Donald Chuck. Porco takes his plane to Milan-based Piccolo, SPA, for repairs. Fio, a 17-year-old girl, redesigns and improves his plane.

Part Three

Porco and Chuck have a great air battle for Fio and for Italian pride.

== Legacy ==
Hikōtei Jidai was the basis for Miyazaki's 1992 anime film Porco Rosso.

== See also ==
- Hayao Miyazaki's Daydream Data Notes, the entire series of Miyazaki's manga publications in Model Graphix magazine.
