= Otto Carius =

German tank commander

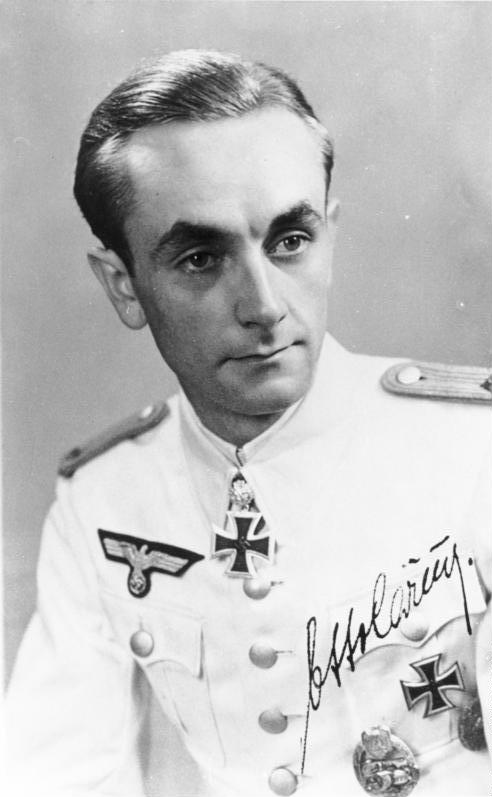
- Carius in 1944
- Born: 27 May 1922; Zweibrücken, Weimar Republic
- Died: 24 January 2015 (aged 92); Herschweiler-Pettersheim, Germany
- Military career
- Allegiance: Nazi Germany
- Branch: Heer
- Service years: 1940–1945
- Rank: Oberleutnant
- Units: 502nd Heavy Panzer Battalion; 512th Heavy Panzerjäger Battalion
- Conflicts: World War II
- Awards: Knight's Cross of the Iron Cross with Oak Leaves
- Other work: Pharmacist

Otto Carius (27 May 1922 – 24 January 2015) was a German tank commander in the Wehrmacht during World War II. He fought on the Eastern Front in 1943 and 1944 and on the Western Front in 1945. Carius is considered a "panzer ace", with some sources crediting him with destroying more than 150 enemy tanks, although Carius, in an interview, claims he had around 100 kills or less. This was also due to the fact that he did not count kills as a commander, and rather only as a gunner. He was a recipient of the Knight's Cross of the Iron Cross with Oak Leaves.

== World War II ==
Early in the war, the slightly built Carius was rejected twice for military service for being underweight. However, he was eventually enlisted and initially served in the infantry, before volunteering for the Panzer branch.

In May 1940, Carius volunteered to join the 104th Infantry Placement Battalion. He saw his first combat action in June 1941, during Operation Barbarossa, the invasion of the Soviet Union. Otto Carius served as the tank’s loader in the 10th Panzer Company. Only a month into the Russian campaign, Carius’ tank was hit and the crew had to bail out for the first time. Carius was hit in the face, losing several teeth in the process. He recovered at an aid station and hitchhiked his way back to the front. In early August 1941, Carius was promoted to Unteroffizier and received orders to report to the 25th Panzer Replacement Battalion to begin officer training. In February 1942, Carius failed to meet the qualifications for officer and was returned to the 21st Panzer Regiment. He was given command of a Panzer platoon, but the regiment only had enough tanks to equip a company, so his platoon had to fight as infantry until they received new Panzer 38(t) tanks. Carius and the rest of the 10th Panzer Company finally received replacement tanks and joined the fight once again. During the fighting in the early summer of 1942, the regiment received its first Panzer III and IV tanks, which helped even the playing field against the tough new Soviet T-34 tanks. For his combat experience and leadership Carius was promoted to Leutnant and served as the commander of the battalion’s pioneer platoon.

In 1943, Carius transferred to the 502nd Heavy Panzer Battalion (schwere Panzer-Abteilung 502). Carius was given command of a Tiger from the 2nd Heavy Panzer Company. After a short stay in France, where the crews became acquainted with their new tanks, the company was dispatched to the Leningrad sector on the East Front. Carius and the rest of the company first saw action in July 1943 and fought for eight straight weeks.

In November 1943, the company was moved to counter the Russian breakthrough near Vitebsk and fought to hold open the important highway to Newel. Here, Carius commanded several attacks with his platoon of Tiger tanks and added several more tank kills to his already impressive tally. It is rumored that he also managed to bring down a Russian fighter aircraft with his Tiger tank. The 2nd Company, 502nd Heavy Panzer Battalion was then ordered to reinforce the front with the 11th ‘Nordland’ SS-Freiwilligen Panzergrenadier Division at Narva. Carius fought hard and as a result won the Knight’s Cross in recognition of his efforts on 4 May 1944.

In June 1944, Carius and the 2nd Heavy Panzer Company were transferred to Dünaburg to fend off the Soviet offensive against Army Group North. The Soviets managed to outflank the German defensive lines further south during Operation Bagration aimed at destroying Army Group Centre. The renewed Soviet assault in the north intended to take the port city of Riga.

He was severely wounded on 24 July 1944 while reconnoitering a village on a motorcycle. Until that day, he was unofficially running the 2nd Company of the 502nd. He officially became commander of 2nd Company on the day he was shot through the leg and arm, with four more wounds in the back and one the neck. When he recovered, he became commander of a Jagdtiger company of the 512th Heavy Antitank Battalion (schwere Panzerjägerabteilung) at the beginning of 1945. On 8 March 1945, 2nd Company was directed to the front line near Siegburg, where it took part in the defense of the River Rhine and eventually surrendered to the United States Army on 15 April 1945.

== Later life ==
After the war, Carius studied pharmacology at University Freiburg and set up a pharmacy which he named the Tiger Apotheke as a tribute to the Tiger tank. He also authored a book about his wartime experiences called "Tigers in the Mud", which was released in 1960. Carius ran his pharmacy until retiring in 2011. He died on 24 January 2015 at age 92.

== Works ==
- Tigers in the Mud: The Combat Career of German Panzer Commander Otto Carius. Mechanicsburg, PA: Stackpole Books. ISBN 978-0-8117-2911-6. The book was adapted into a manga by Hayao Miyazaki.

== Awards ==
- Iron Cross (1939)
  - 2nd Class (15 September 1942)
  - 1st Class (23 November 1943)
- Knight's Cross of the Iron Cross with Oak Leaves
  - Knight's Cross on 4 May 1944 as Leutnant of the Reserves and Zugführer (platoon leader) in the 2./schwere Panzer-Abteilung 502
  - 535th Oak Leaves on 27 July 1944 as Leutnant of the Reserves and leader of the 2./schwere Panzer-Abteilung 502
- Panzer Badge in Silver 2nd Grade (15 July 1944) & 3rd Grade (1 September 1944)
- Wound Badge in Black (8 July 1941), in Silver (15 December 1943) & in Gold (11 September 1944)

== See also ==
- Michael Wittmann
- Kurt Knispel
