= Herborn, Rhineland-Palatinate =

Herborn
- Municipality
- Coat of arms

- Location of Herborn within Birkenfeld district
- Interactive map of Herborn
- Location within Germany Location within Rhineland-Palatinate
- Coordinates: 49°46′09″N 07°17′43″E
- Country: Germany
- State: Rhineland-Palatinate
- District: Birkenfeld
- Municipal assoc.: Herrstein-Rhaunen

Government
  - Mayor (2019–24): Peter Remuta

Area
  - Total: 2.46 km^{2} (0.95 sq mi)
- Elevation: 455 m (1,493 ft)

Population (2025-12-31)
  - Total: 531
  - Density: 216/km^{2} (559/sq mi)
- Time zone: UTC+01:00 (CET)
  - Summer (DST): UTC+02:00 (CEST)
- Postal codes: 55758
- Dialling codes: 06781
- Vehicle registration: BIR
- Website: www.herborn-hunsrueck.de

Herborn (German pronunciation: [ˈhɛʁbɔʁn]) is an Ortsgemeinde – a municipality belonging to a Verbandsgemeinde, a kind of collective municipality – in the Birkenfeld district in Rhineland-Palatinate, Germany. It belongs to the Verbandsgemeinde Herrstein-Rhaunen, whose seat is in Herrstein.

== Geography ==
The municipality lies at the edge of the Königswald (forest) in the Hunsrück. Almost half the municipal area is wooded. Three kilometres to the south lies Idar-Oberstein on the river Nahe.

== History ==
In 1319, Herborn had its first documentary mention under the name Horbure. At that time it was held by the Waldgrave of Wildenburg.

The Waldgrave held absolute power over both low and high jurisdiction. Soon, however, the Lords of Steinkallenfels and Wartenstein somehow managed to take over. Thereafter, the village belonged to them and they grouped it into the Amt of Weiden, whose fate it then shared.

The Waldgraves and Rhinegraves later tried to take back at least the court jurisdiction over the village, but their attempt in 1500 led the Lords of Wartenstein to appeal to the “old” Trier Lehnsferse, a body constituted for this purpose among others. They decided that Herborn belonged to the court district (Gericht) of Weiden.

There was another claim to both low and high jurisdiction over Herborn in 1586 by Waldgrave and Rhinegrave Otto, and he tried again in 1603, taking advantage of a situation whereby the von Warsbergs had pledged the village to the Amt of Wildenburg. In neither instance, however, could he build a solid enough case for his claim.

Even as late as 1685, the Metz Chambre des Réunions was describing the question of high jurisdiction over Herborn as being disputed among the Electorate of Trier, the feudal lords of Warsberg and the Rhinegraves. Against Electoral Trier’s might, however, the Rhinegraves could not bring their claims to fruition.

By the 18th century, the Warsbergs, too, no longer had any rights in the Amt of Weiden. They had been revoked by the Electorate of Trier, and the Rhinegraves’ lordship extended to one subject, a man who had to bring his grain to the Fockenhauser mill to be ground.

In Napoleonic times, Herborn was grouped into the Mairie (“Mayoralty”) of Herrstein, whose fate it then shared until 1 July 1910 when it was grouped along with Veitsrodt into the Bürgermeisterei (“Mayoralty”) of Idar-Land, which administered it until 1933. In that year, on 1 October, the Bürgermeisterei of Idar-Land was dissolved and Herborn was once again grouped into the Bürgermeisterei of Herrstein, to which it still belongs, although in the meantime, the old Bürgermeisterei has been restructured into a Verbandsgemeinde.

== Politics ==
=== Municipal council ===
The council is made up of 12 council members, who were elected by majority vote at the municipal election held on 7 June 2009, and the honorary mayor as chairman.

=== Mayor ===
Herborn’s mayor is Peter Remuta, and his deputies are Gerhard Dunkel and Susanne Lang.

=== Coat of arms ===
The municipality’s arms might be described thus: Per pale sable a village pump with trough argent and argent a cross gules.

== Culture and sightseeing ==
The following are listed buildings or sites in Rhineland-Palatinate’s Directory of Cultural Monuments:

- Hauptstraße 32 – Quereinhaus (a combination residential and commercial house divided for these two purposes down the middle, perpendicularly to the street), current appearance from the early 20th century, gem grinding shop built onto the back

Northwest of the village on the Wildenburger Kopf (mountain) stands what is left of Castle Wildenburg, along with a 22-metre lookout tower.

== Economy and infrastructure ==
Running through Herborn is bus route 351 of the Omnibusverkehr-Rhein-Nahe. This runs up to ten times daily to Idar-Oberstein railway station on the Nahe Valley Railway (Bingen–Saarbrücken), and into the Hunsrück, with some runs going as far as Frankfurt-Hahn Airport.
