= Jagdtiger =

Panzerjäger Tiger Ausf. B Jagdpanzer VI Jagdtiger Ausf. B 12.8cm PaK44 auf Panzerjäger Tiger
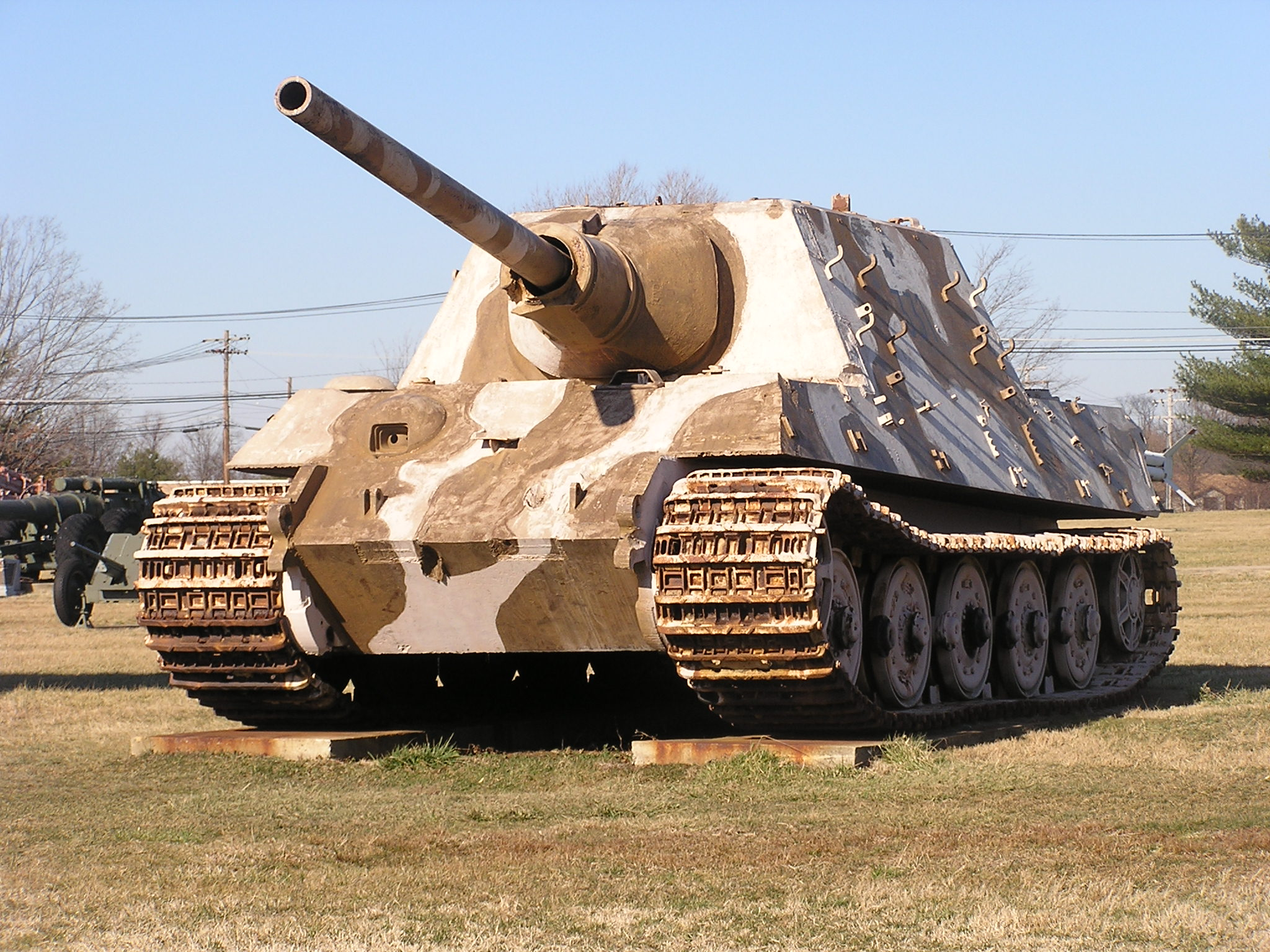
- Jagdtiger (S/N 305020) while displayed at the U.S. Army Ordnance Museum's former site at Aberdeen, Maryland, in 2008
- Type: Heavy tank destroyer
- Place of origin: Nazi Germany

Production history
- Manufacturer: Nibelungenwerk (Steyr-Daimler-Puch)
- Produced: 1944–1945
- No. built: 70–88

Specifications
- Mass: 71.7 tonnes (158,000 lb) (Henschel-suspension variant)
- Length: 10.65 m (34 ft 11 in) including gun
- Width: 3.6 m (11 ft 10 in)
- Height: 2.8 m (9 ft 2 in)
- Crew: 6 (commander, gunner, loader, assistant loader, driver, assistant driver)
- Armor: Casemate: 250 mm (9.84 in); Hull: 150 mm (5.91 in); Side: 80 mm (3.15 in); Rear: 80 mm (3.15 in)
- Main armament: 1 × 12.8 cm Pak 44 L/55
- Secondary armament: 1 × 7.92 mm MG 34 (some later-built versions equipped with a single MG 42 anti-aircraft machine gun-mount at the vehicle's rear)
- Engine: V-12 Maybach HL230 P30; 600 hp(M) (591 hp(I), 441 kW)
- Power/weight: 8 hp(M) (5.7 kW) / tonne
- Suspension: Torsion bar
- Fuel capacity: 860 L
- Operational range: Road: 120 km (75 mi); Off road: 80 km (50 mi)
- Maximum speed: 34 km/h (21 mph)

The Jagdtiger ("Hunting Tiger"; officially designated Panzerjäger Tiger Ausf. B) is a German casemate-type heavy tank destroyer (Jagdpanzer) of World War II. It was built upon the slightly lengthened chassis of a Tiger II. Its ordnance inventory designation was Sd.Kfz. 186.

The 72-tonne Jagdtiger was the heaviest armored fighting vehicle (AFV) used operationally by any nation in WWII. It was armed with a 12.8 cm Pak 44 L/55 main gun which could out-range and defeat any AFV fielded by the Allied forces.

It saw service in small numbers from late 1944 until the end of the war on the Western and Eastern Front. Although 150 were ordered, only around 80 were produced. Due to its heavy weight and relatively weak drivetrain, the Jagdtiger was plagued with mobility and mechanical problems. Although the Jagdtiger could destroy Allied tanks over long distances from good ambush positions, it has been argued that they were a costly failure because of the effort needed to build and maintain them. Three Jagdtigers survive in museums.

== Development ==
With the success of the StuG III, Marder I, Marder II, and Marder III Panzerjäger, German military leaders decided to use the chassis of existing armored fighting vehicles for self-propelled guns (serving as assault guns and tank destroyers). German tank destroyers of World War II used fixed casemates instead of fully rotatable turrets to reduce the cost, weight, and materials necessary for mounting large-caliber guns.

A wooden mockup of the Jagdtiger presented to Adolf Hitler on the 20th of October 1943, seen here behind the Italian medium tank Carro Armato P 26/40

In early 1942, the Army General Staff requested a 128 mm gun be mounted on a self-propelled armored chassis. Firing tests of the 128 mm gun showed it to have a high percentage of hits. Smaller caliber guns, such as the ubiquitous 88 mm and the slightly larger 105 mm, were also tested.

By early 1943, a decision was made to install a 128 mm gun on either a Panther or Tiger I chassis as a heavy assault gun. The Panther chassis was considered unsuitable after a wooden mockup of the design was constructed. On 20 October 1943, another wooden mockup was constructed on a Tiger II heavy tank chassis, and presented to Hitler in East Prussia. Two prototypes were produced: one was fitted with the eight-roadwheel Porsche suspension system (serial number 305001) and another with the Henschel nine-overlapping roadwheel suspension system (serial number 305002), as used on the main-production Tiger IIs constructed by Henschel. They were completed in February 1944. It was originally designated as Jagdpanzer VI but was later renamed as the Jagdtiger and received the Sd.Kfz. 186 designation as its inventory ordnance number.

== Design ==
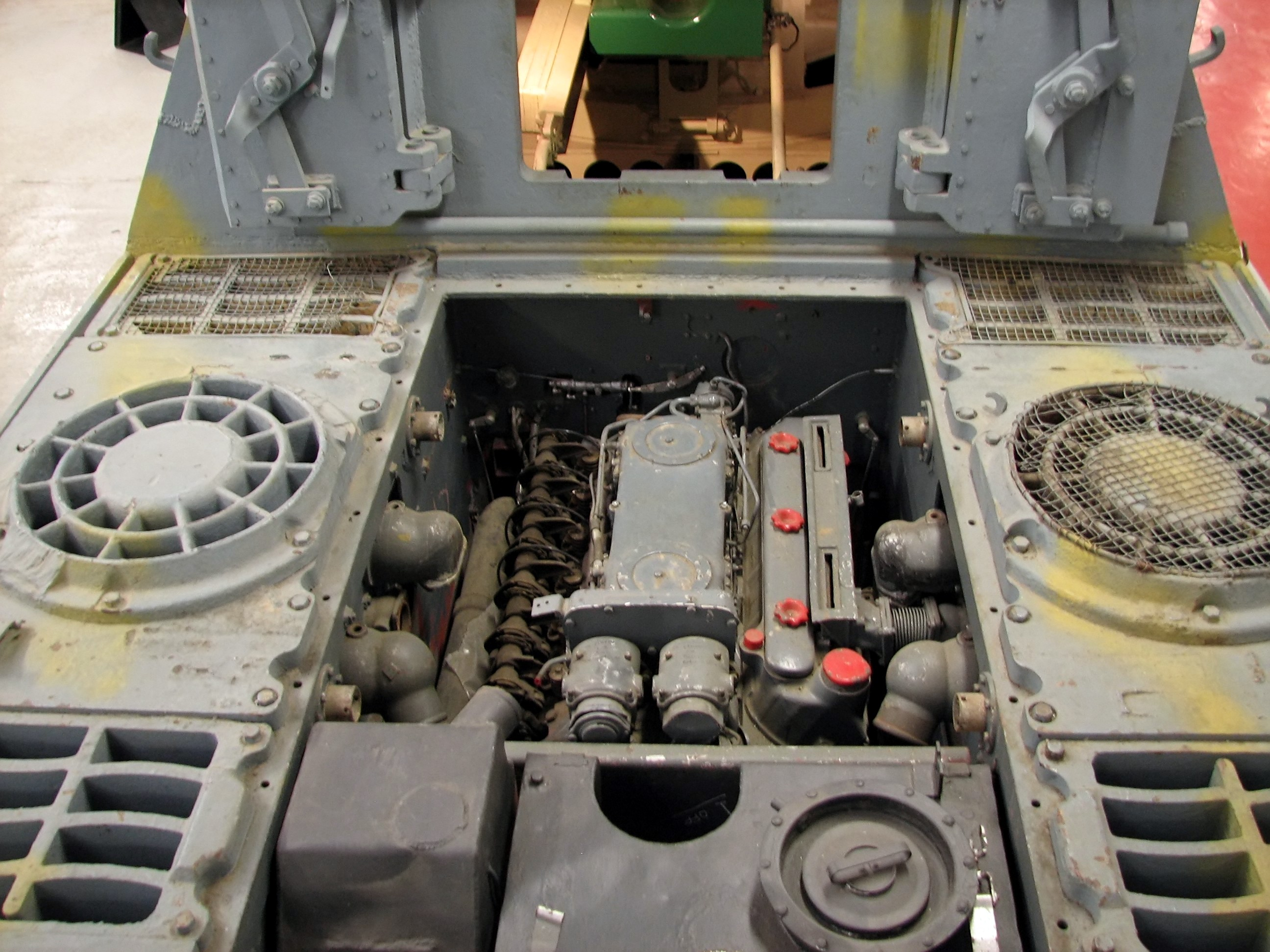
Rear deck and engine bay of Jagdtiger 305004 in The Tank Museum, Bovington. The two circular grilled apertures at left and right are for the radiator cooling fans.

The Jagdtiger was a logical extension of the creation of Jagdpanzer designs from tank designs, such as the Jagdpanzer IV or the Jagdpanther from the Panzer IV and Panther tanks respectively, with a fully armored and enclosed casemate-style fighting compartment. The Jagdtiger used a boxy superstructure, with its sides integral with the hull sides, on top of a lengthened Tiger II chassis. Unlike the Jagdpanther, the Jagdtiger's casemate design did not extend its glacis plate upwards in one piece to the full height of the casemate's "roof" – it used a separate forward plate to form its casemate structure atop the hull roof, and mount its anti-tank gun. The resulting vehicle featured very heavy armor. It had 250 mm (9.8 in) armor on the front of the casemate and 150 mm (5.9 in) on the glacis plate.

As main armament, the vehicle mounted the 128 mm (5.0 in) Panzerjägerkanone 44 gun, 55 calibres in length. A 7.92 mm (0.312 in) MG 34 machine gun was mounted in the glacis plate of the hull. The main gun mount had a limited traverse of only ±10 degrees; the entire vehicle had to be maneuvered in order to aim outside this narrow field of fire. The main gun was sighted with a Winkelzielfernrohr 2/1 optic while the hull machine gun was sighted with a Kugelzielfernrohr 2 optic. The main gun used two-part ammunition, which meant that the projectile and its propellant charge were loaded into the breech separately, necessitating the need for two loaders. Additional armament consisted of a 7.92 mm (0.312 in) MG 42 machine gun on a Fliegerdrehstütze 36 mount which could be installed on the engine deck for anti-aircraft purposes and a Nahverteidigungswaffe launcher mounted on the roof of the casemate which was used for close defense against infantry.

The Jagdtiger's immense weight, under-powered engine and relatively weak drivetrain caused breakdowns and other problems. More Jagdtigers were lost to mechanical problems or lack of fuel than to enemy action.

== Production ==
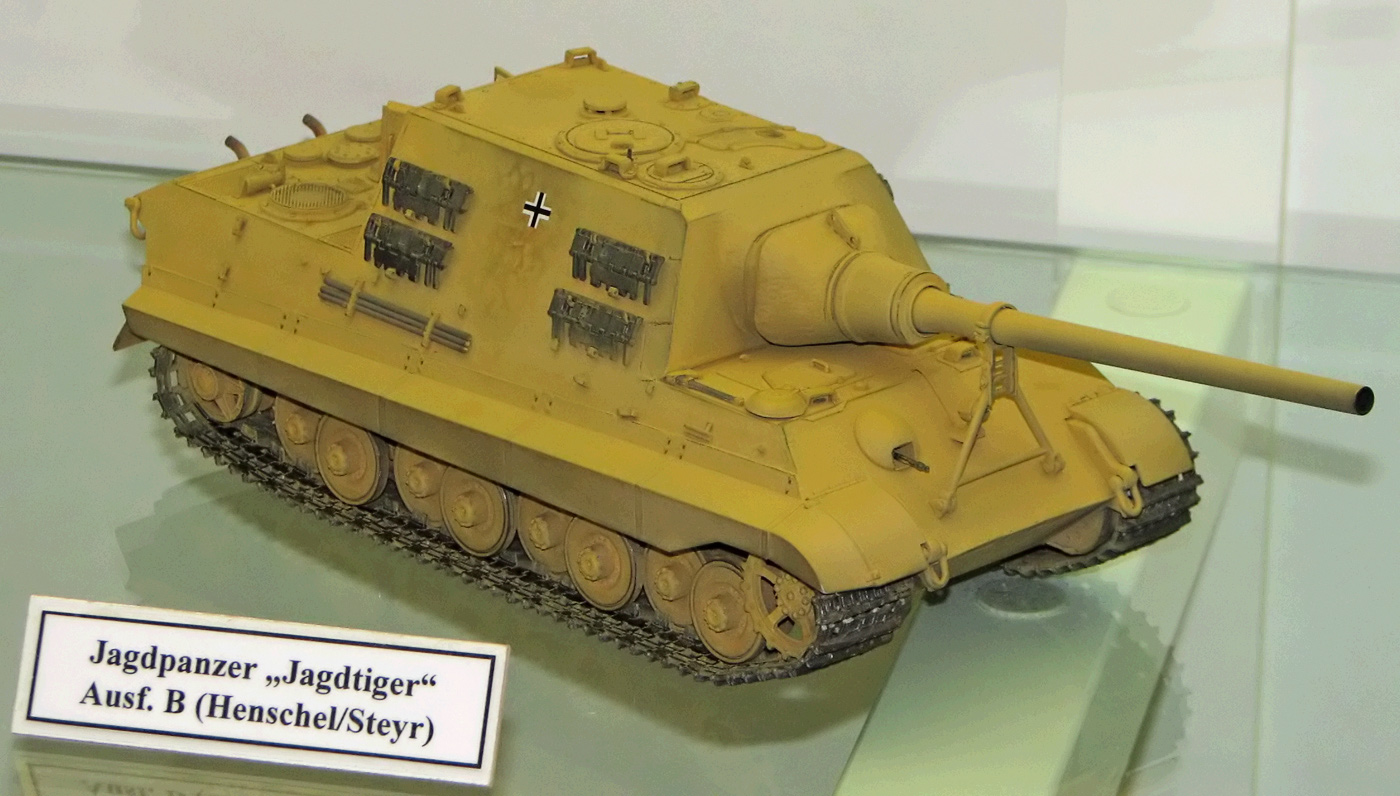
Model of the eight-wheel, Porsche suspension variant

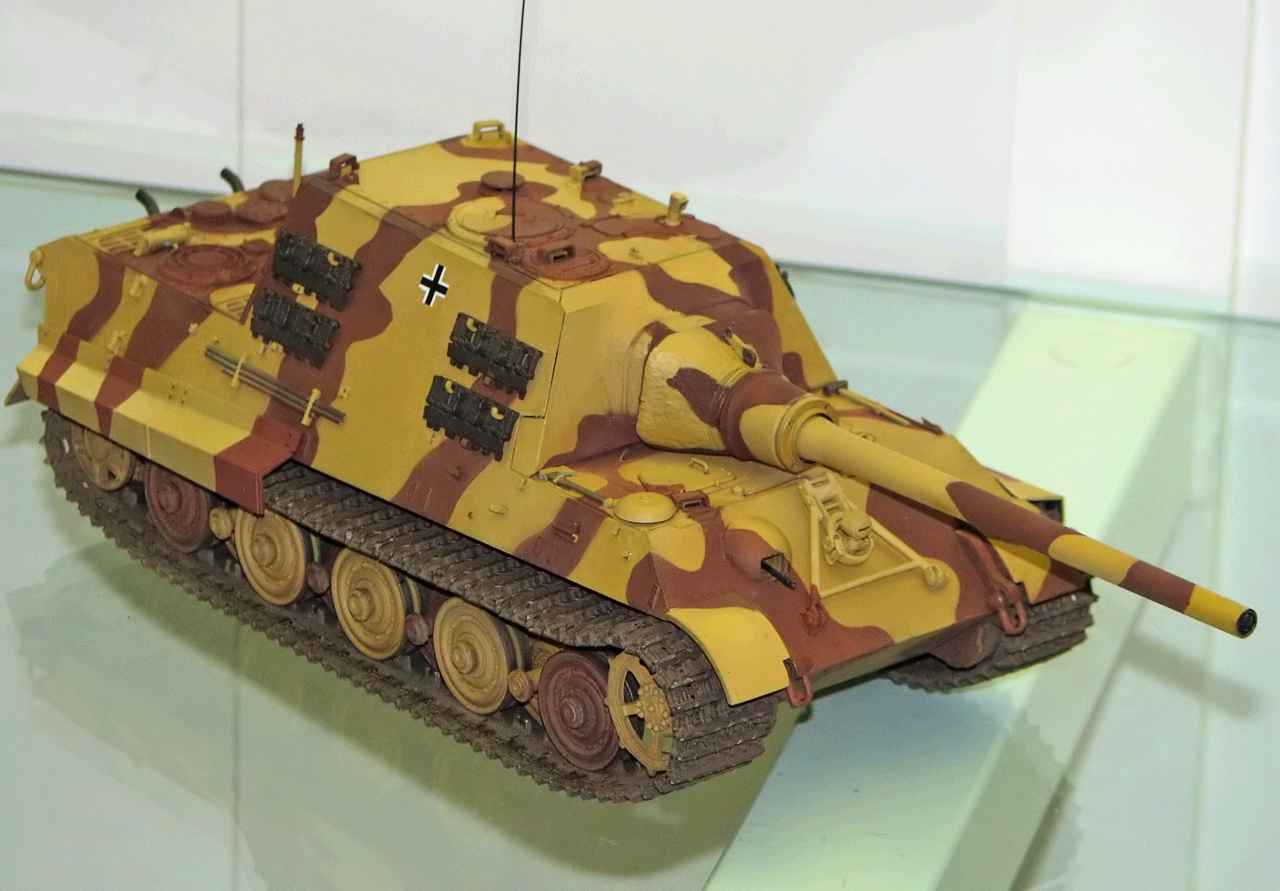
Model of the nine-wheel, Henschel suspension variant

One hundred and fifty Jagdtigers were initially ordered but only between 70 and 85 were produced at the Nibelungenwerk at St. Valentin, from July 1944 to May 1945. Eleven of them, serial numbers 305001 and 305003 to 305012, were produced with the Porsche suspension (with eight road wheels per side); all the rest used the Henschel suspension with nine road wheels per side.

Important parts such as the tub, superstructure and drive wheels were supplied by the Eisenwerke Oberdonau. Details and production locations were known to the Allies through the resistance group around the later executed priest Heinrich Maier. Prisoners from the St. Valentin concentration camp were used to build the tank.

Production figures vary depending on source and other factors such as if prototypes are included and if those made after VE Day are included: approximately 48 from July 1944 to the end of December 1944; 36 from January to April 1945, serial numbers from 305001 to 305088.

Production history by serial number
Date	Number produced	Serial #
February 1944	2	305001–305002
July 1944	3	305003–305005
August 1944	3	305006–305008
September 1944	8	305009–305016
October 1944	9	305017–305025
November 1944	6	305026–305031
December 1944	20	305032–305051
January 1945	10	305052–305061
February 1945	13	305062–305074
March 1945	3	305075–305077
April 1945	7	305078–305084
May 1945	4	305085–305088

After serial number 305011 (September 1944), no Zimmerit anti-magnetic paste was factory applied.

== Combat history ==
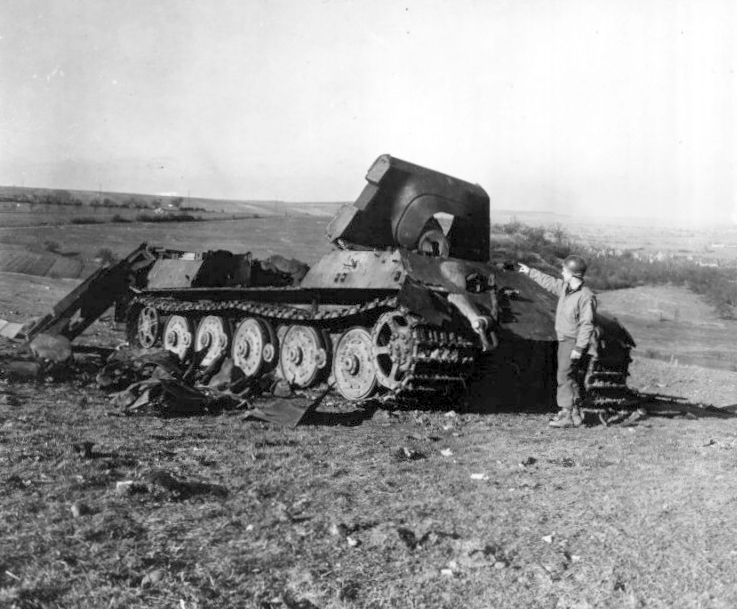
Destroyed Jagdtiger, in Northeastern France in 1945

Only two heavy anti-tank battalions (schwere Panzerjäger-Abteilung), numbered the 512th and 653rd, were equipped with Jagdtigers, with the first vehicles reaching the units in September 1944. About 20% were lost in combat, with most destroyed by their crews when abandoned because of breakdowns or lack of fuel.

The first Jagdtiger lost in combat was during the failed Operation Nordwind offensive in France in 1945. Despite its heavy armour, this Jagdtiger was lost to American infantry using a bazooka, which at the time was considered ineffective against such a massive vehicle.

Tiger I tank ace Otto Carius commanded the second of three companies of Jagdtigers in s.Pz.Jg.Abt. 512. His postwar memoir Tigers in the Mud provides a history of the 10 Jagdtigers under his command. He said the Jagdtigers were not utilized to their potential due to factors including Allied air supremacy making it difficult to maneuver and the heavy gun needing to be re-calibrated after travelling off-road even short distances. (Note: This was attributed to the eight-wheel Porsche suspension proving unfit for off-road terrain, causing excessive vibrations. The nine-wheel Henschel suspension system from the King Tiger was thought to suffer less from this problem. It is unknown which type was fitted to the Jagdtigers Carius commanded.) The vehicle was slow, having the same engine as the already-underpowered Tiger I and Tiger II. The vehicles' transmissions and differentials broke down easily because the whole 72-tonne vehicle needed to rotate for the gun's traverse. The enormous 128 mm main-gun had to be locked down during the vehicle's maneuvers, otherwise its mounting-brackets would wear out too much for accurate firing afterwards. This meant a crew-member had to exit the vehicle in combat and unlock the gun from its frontally mounted gun travel-lock before firing. Carius said a 128 mm projectile went through the walls of a house during combat and destroyed an American tank behind it.

Poor training and morale at the war's end were the biggest problems for Jagdtiger crewmen under Carius's command. At the Ruhr Pocket, two Jagdtiger commanders failed to attack an American armored column about 1.5 km (1 mile) away in daylight for fear of attracting an Allied air attack, even though the Jagdtigers were well-camouflaged. Both vehicles broke down while hurriedly withdrawing from the supposed air attack that did not materialize and one had to be destroyed by its crew. To prevent such a disaster at Siegen, Carius dug in his command vehicle on high ground. An approaching American armored column avoided his ambush because nearby German civilians warned them of it. Later, one of his vehicles fell into a bomb crater at night and was disabled while another was lost to a Panzerfaust attack by friendly Volkssturm militia troops who had never seen a Jagdtiger before and mistook it for an Allied vehicle.

Near Unna, one Jagdtiger climbed a hill to attack five American tanks 600 meters away, prompting two to retreat and the other three to open fire. The Jagdtiger took several hits but none of the American projectiles could penetrate the 250 mm (9.8 in) thick frontal armor of the vehicle's casemate. However, the inexperienced German commander lost his nerve and turned around instead of backing away, thus exposing the thinner side armor, which was penetrated and all six crew members killed. Carius wrote that these crews were not trained or experienced enough to keep their thick frontal armour facing the enemy in combat.

When trapped in the Ruhr Pocket, Carius ordered the guns of the remaining Jagdtigers destroyed to prevent intact vehicles falling into Allied hands and then surrendered to American forces. The 10 Jagdtigers of the 2nd Company of s.Pz.Jg.Abt. 512 destroyed one American tank for one Jagdtiger lost to combat, one lost to friendly fire, and eight others lost to mechanical breakdown or destruction by their own crews to prevent capture by enemy forces.

On 17 January 1945, two Jagdtigers used by the Heer's XIV Corps engaged a line of bunkers in support of assaulting infantry near Auenheim. On 18 January, they attacked four secure bunkers at a range of 1,000 meters. The armored cupola of one bunker burned out after two shots. A Sherman attacking in a counter-thrust was set afire by explosive shells. The two Jagdtigers survived the fight, having fired 46 explosive shells and 10 anti-tank shells.

In April 1945, s.Pz.Jäg.Abt. 512 saw a great deal of action, especially on 9 April, where the 1st Company engaged an Allied column of Sherman tanks and trucks from hull-down positions and destroyed 11 tanks and over 30 unarmored or lightly armored targets, with some of the enemy tanks knocked out from a distance of more than 4,000 m. The unit lost one Jagdtiger to Republic P-47 Thunderbolt fighter-bombers. During the next couple of days, the 1st Company destroyed a further five Sherman tanks before surrendering to US troops at Iserlohn. Meanwhile, the 2nd Company fought on with little gain. On 15 April 1945, the unit also surrendered at Schillerplatz in Iserlohn.

== Survivors ==
Three Jagdtigers survive, in US, UK and Russian museums:

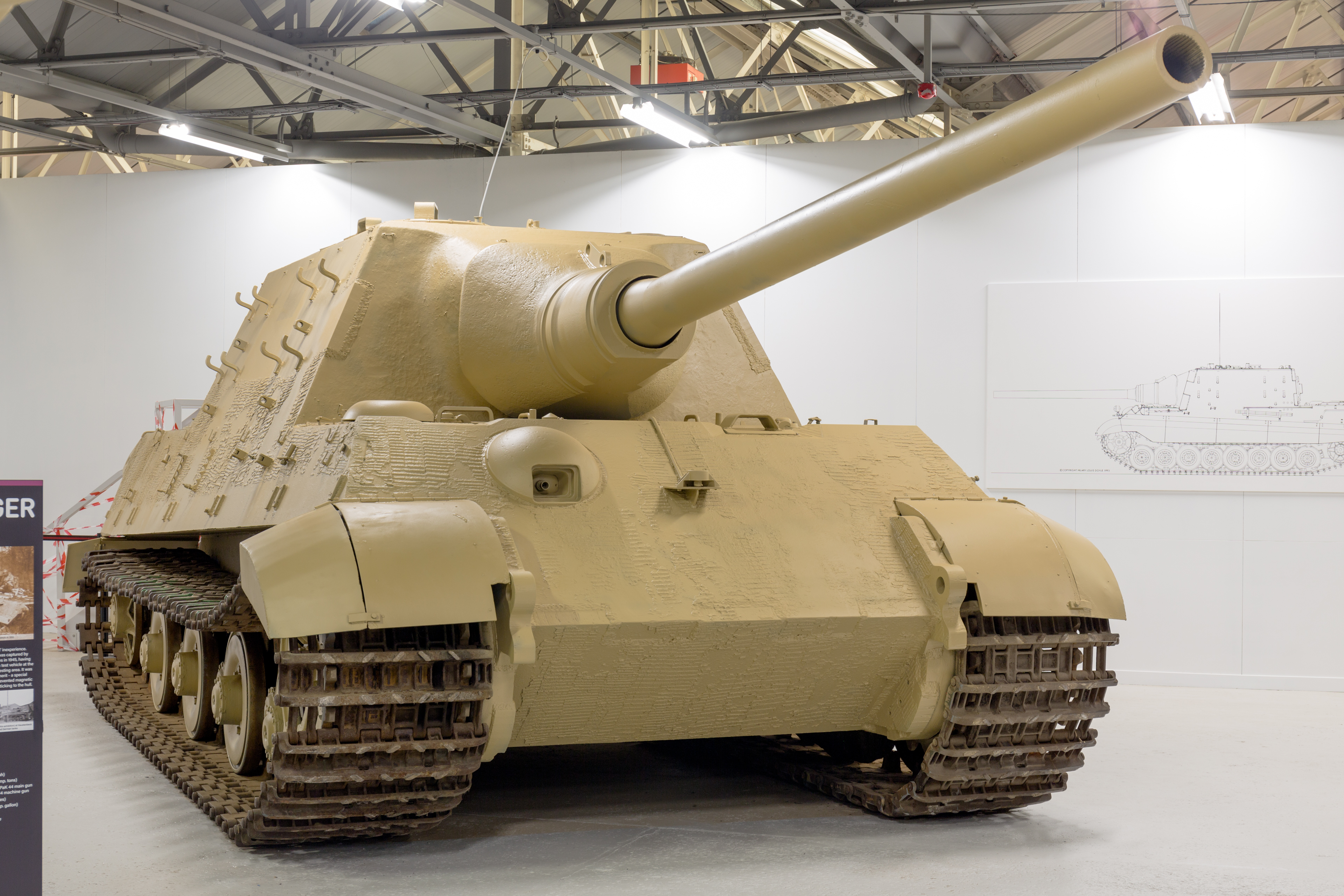
British-captured Jagdtiger in The Tank Museum, the UK (2017)

- Jagdtiger (serial number 305004): The Tank Museum in England. One of the 11 Porsche–designed suspension-equipped variants, it was captured by British troops in April 1945 near the armour proving ground at Sennelager, Germany, where it was undergoing testing and trials. The third wheel-station (paired-wheel bogie) on the left side is missing. Zimmerit was applied to approximately 2 meters high on the superstructure and the German Balkenkreuz was painted in the mid-section of the vehicle's casemate's side. The earlier 18-tooth drive-sprocket version is found on this vehicle (later vehicles had 9-tooth drive sprockets).
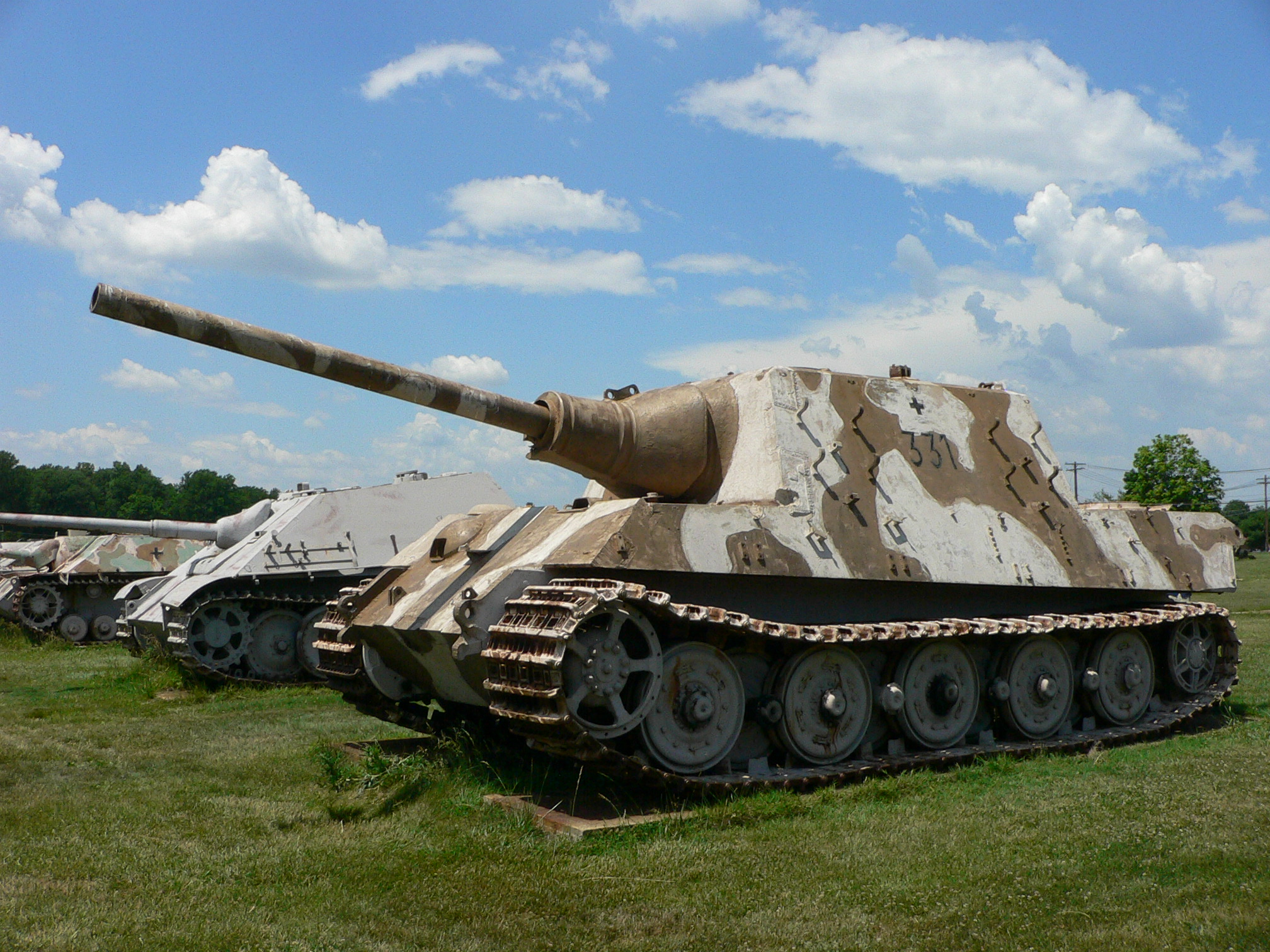
  Jagdtiger (serial number 305020) on display at the former US Army Ordnance Museum in 2007
- Jagdtiger (serial number 305020): U.S. Army Armor & Cavalry Collection, Fort Benning, Georgia. It was produced in October 1944 and was attached to the 3rd Company of the s.Pz.Jg.Abt. 653, bearing the vehicle-number of 331. It was captured by American troops near Neustadt an der Weinstraße, Germany in March 1945. Shell damage is still visible on the gun mantlet, glacis plate and lower-nose armor. This vehicle used the later-version nine-tooth drive sprockets for use with the 'contact shoe' and 'connector link'-style continuous track it shared with the Tiger II on which it was based.

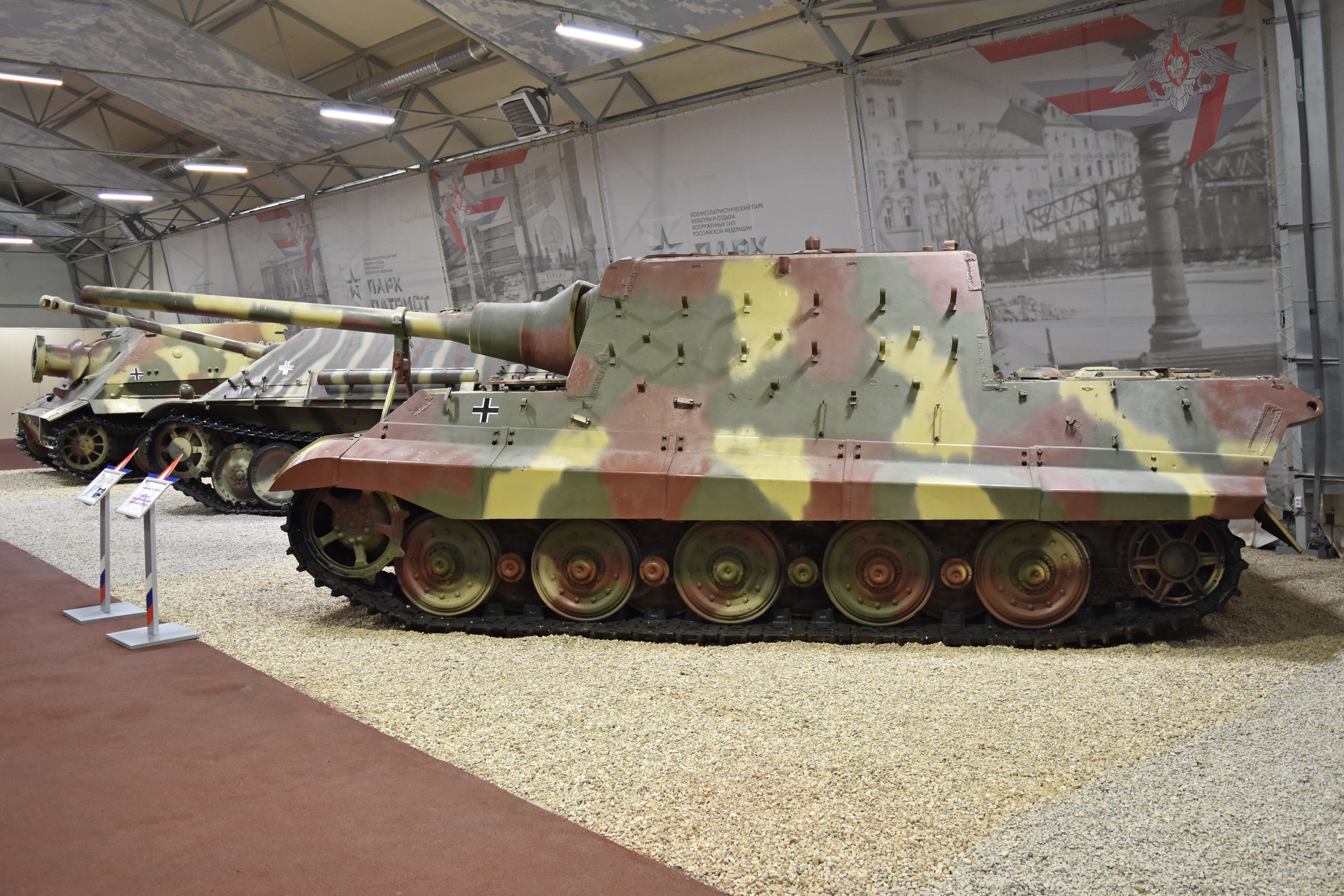
Kubinka Tank Museum's Jagdtiger on display in Russia (2017)

- Jagdtiger (serial number 305083): Kubinka Tank Museum near Moscow. This vehicle, equipped with the standard Henschel-built running gear, was acquired by Soviet forces when a Kampfgruppe (battle-group) of the s.Pz.Jg.Abt. 653 equipped with four Jagdtigers surrendered to the Red Army in Amstetten, Austria on 5 May 1945. This Jagdtiger, not coated with Zimmerit, was acquired in mint condition with complete sideskirts and the later nine-tooth drive sprockets. Twelve hooks on both sides of the superstructure were designed to carry six pairs of track-links (the spare track-links are now missing on this vehicle). All of the Jagdtiger's repair-tools are also missing, but it still retains the MG 42 anti-aircraft gun mount on the rear engine-deck (recent photographs show that this specific machine gun-mount has since been removed, leaving only its mounting-base).

== Variants ==
Aside from the 11 early vehicles with a Porsche suspension, the only variant developed was the Sd.Kfz.185.

- 8.8 cm PaK 43 Jagdtiger – This variant used the 8.8 cm Pak 43 cannon instead of the 12.8 cm Pak 44 due to shortages of the latter weapon. The variant did not enter production.

== See also ==
- List of WWII Maybach engines
- Sturer Emil
- Elefant
- Jagdpanther

=== Tanks of comparable role, performance and era ===
- Soviet ISU-152 and ISU-122 – heavy tank–based assault guns that frequently found themselves employed as heavy tank destroyers
- Soviet SU-100Y – another SPG used as tank destroyer
- British Tortoise heavy assault tank - very heavy late war, casemate designed armored fighting vehicle that was intended to be used for assaulting defenses and potentially a heavy tank destroyer
