= Porco Rosso =

1992 Japanese animated film

- Theatrical release poster
- Kanji: 紅の豚
- Literal meaning: Crimson Pig
- Revised Hepburn: Kurenai no Buta
- Directed by: Hayao Miyazaki
- Screenplay by: Hayao Miyazaki
- Based on: Hikōtei Jidai by Hayao Miyazaki
- Produced by: Toshio Suzuki
- Starring: Shūichirō Moriyama; Tokiko Kato; Akemi Okamura; Akio Otsuka
- Cinematography: Atsushi Okui
- Edited by: Takeshi Seyama
- Music by: Joe Hisaishi
- Production company: Studio Ghibli
- Distributed by: Toho
- Release date: July 18, 1992 (Japan)
- Running time: 94 minutes
- Country: Japan
- Language: Japanese
- Box office: $44.6 million (est.)

Porco Rosso (Japanese: 紅の豚, Hepburn: Kurenai no Buta; both lit. 'Red/Crimson Pig') is a 1992 Japanese animated adventure fantasy film written and directed by Hayao Miyazaki, based on his 1989 manga Hikōtei Jidai. The film stars the voices of Shūichirō Moriyama, Tokiko Kato, Akemi Okamura and Akio Otsuka. It was produced by Toshio Suzuki, animated by Studio Ghibli, and distributed by Toho. The score was composed by Joe Hisaishi.

The plot revolves around an Italian World War I ex-fighter ace, now living as a freelance bounty hunter chasing "air pirates" in the Adriatic Sea. However, an unusual curse has transformed him into an anthropomorphic pig. Once called Marco Pagot (Marco Rossolini in the American version), he is now known to the world as "Porco Rosso" ("Red Pig" in Italian).

A first English-dubbed version was made for Japan Airlines and included in the Ghibli LD Box Set and on the first Region 2 DVD releases in 2002. The film was later redubbed by Walt Disney Home Entertainment and released on DVD and Blu-ray in the United States and Canada on February 22, 2005. GKIDS re-issued the film on Blu-ray and DVD on November 21, 2017, under a new deal with Studio Ghibli.

== Plot ==
In 1929, Italian World War I fighter ace and bounty hunter Porco Rosso responds to a call from an ocean liner that was attacked by airborne pirates who took child hostages and valuables. Porco, cursed to have a pig's head by unknown means, outmaneuvers the pirates and rescues the hostages, letting the pirates escape with half the valuables. At night, he dines with his childhood friend, Gina, at her Hotel Adriano.

The pirates contract American ace Curtis to assist their attacks. Curtis falls in love with Gina despite her being in love with Porco. While Porco is flying to Milan to have his red seaplane serviced, Curtis shoots him down. Porco survives and continues the trip by boat with his damaged plane, much to Gina's irritation. She reminds him there is a warrant for his arrest in Italy.

Porco meets his mechanic Piccolo in Milan. Piccolo's sons have emigrated so the work will be done by his young granddaughter Fio. Once Porco's plane is finished, Fio joins him on his flight home as cover should the secret police arrest them. They can claim that Porco took Fio hostage to force Piccolo to help. The new fascist government is hiring pirates for their own use, putting Porco out of business.

Curtis proposes to Gina but she says she is waiting for Porco. Gina sits in her garden each afternoon, waiting for Porco to meet her there, but he only ever visits her at night when the dim light will obscure his appearance. Porco and Fio are ambushed by the pirates, and Curtis challenges Porco to a duel. Fio declares that if Porco wins, Curtis must pay his debts owed to Piccolo's company, and if Curtis wins, he may marry her.

While Porco is preparing shells, Fio glimpses his true face. Porco tells Fio a story from World War I. Just after Gina's wedding to Porco's pilot friend Bellini, their squadron was attacked. Porco entered a cloud to evade his pursuers. He blacked out then awakened to complete stillness above the clouds. The airmen who died in the dogfight—Bellini included—rose out of the cloud to fly up towards a band of thousands of planes flying together. After offering in vain to die in Bellini's place for Gina's sake, he awakened again flying alone low over the sea. He concludes that he is meant to "fly solo". Fio rebukes him and kisses his cheek.

Curtis and Porco's dogfight devolves into a boxing match when both planes' guns jam. Porco accuses Curtis of being a womanizer; Curtis responds that Porco is worse: Fio adores him, and Gina is waiting on him to the exclusion of any other, but he does not reciprocate. The combatants knock each other out and fall into the shallow water. Gina calls out to Porco, who rises first and is declared the winner. She warns that the Italian air force is on its way, and invites everyone to regroup at her hotel. Porco requests Gina look after Fio and turns away. Fio gives Porco a kiss.

Porco volunteers to lead the air force away and invites Curtis to join him. As they walk to their planes, Curtis catches a glimpse of Porco's face and says he has changed; he asks to get a better look and is refused. As she flies in a jet seaplane, Fio narrates the epilogue: Porco outflew the Italian air force and remained at large; Fio became president of the Piccolo aircraft company; Curtis became a famous actor, and the pirates continued to attend the Hotel Adriano in their old age. She says that whether Gina's hope for Porco Rosso was ever realized is their secret. A red seaplane is docked by Gina's garden as Fio flies over the hotel, and a shot of Gina's garden reveals that she is no longer there waiting.

== Cast ==
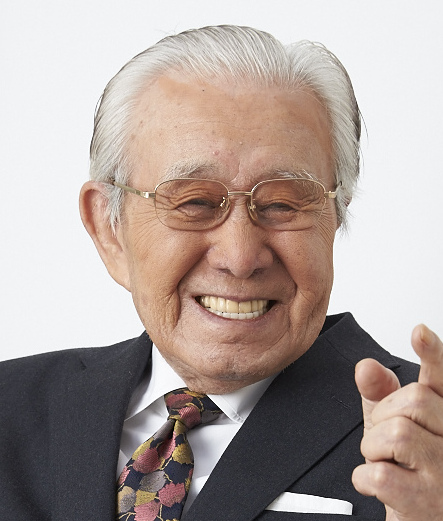
Shūichirō Moriyama

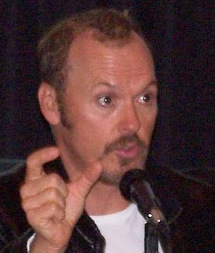
Michael Keaton

Porco was voiced by Moriyama in Japanese and Keaton in the 2005 English dub

Character name		Voice actor		
Original	English dub	Japanese	English	
Original	English dub	Original, 1992	Japan Airlines, 1992	Walt Disney Pictures, 2005
Porco Rosso / Marco Pagot	Porco Rosso / Marco Rossolini	Shūichirō Moriyama	Ward Sexton	Michael Keaton
Donald Curtis		Akio Otsuka	Unknown	Cary Elwes
Fio Piccolo		Akemi Okamura	Lynn Eve Harris	Kimberly Williams-Paisley
Madame Gina		Tokiko Kato	Unknown	Susan Egan
Mr. Piccolo		Sanshi Katsura	Unknown	David Ogden Stiers
Ferrarin	Ferrari	Mahito Tsujimura	Unknown	Tom Kenny
Capo	Boss	Tsunehiko Kamijō	Unknown	Brad Garrett
Mamma Aiuto Gang Members		Reizō Nomoto	Unknown	Bill Fagerbakke
Mamma Aiuto Gang Members		Osamu Saka	Unknown	Kevin Michael Richardson
Mamma Aiuto Gang Members		Yuu Shimaka	Barry Gjerde	Frank Welker

The French dub of the film stars Jean Reno as Porco.

== Production ==
The film was originally planned as a short in-flight film for Japan Airlines based on Hayao Miyazaki's manga The Age of the Flying Boat, but grew into a feature-length film. The success of Kiki's Delivery Service placed pressure on Miyazaki's next feature film, so he decided to produce Porco Rosso as a shorter, direct-to-video interim.

Production began in the summer of 1989, but quickly stalled due to high expenses. The following winter, producer Toshio Suzuki suggested that the film be distributed to airlines, since it heavily featured aircraft. The idea was pitched to Japan Airlines, and the project became Japan's first in-flight feature film production, to be shown only on international flights.

In November 1990, production resumed with an initial budget of ¥200,000,000 and a half-hour runtime. The runtime was extended to 45 minutes in August 1991 as Miyazaki's storyboards grew, and later to an hour, which qualified the project as a feature film. Production paused until a theatrical release was negotiated alongside the in-flight release, which would now be a month earlier.

Working with Suzuki, Miyazaki experienced extensive issues with the storyboarding process. These problems were resolved by introducing the character of Gina and her relationship with Porco, Porco's curse, and the daydream sequence, which was inspired by They Shall Not Grow Old, a short story by Roald Dahl.

The outbreak of war in Yugoslavia cast a shadow over production and prompted a more serious tone for the film, which had been set in Dalmatia. The airline remained a major investor in the film and showed it as an in-flight film well before its theatrical release. Due to this, the opening text introducing the film appears simultaneously in Japanese, Italian, Korean, English, Chinese, Spanish, Arabic, Russian, French, and German. Telecom Animation Film Co., Ltd. helped animate the film.

== History, geography and politics ==
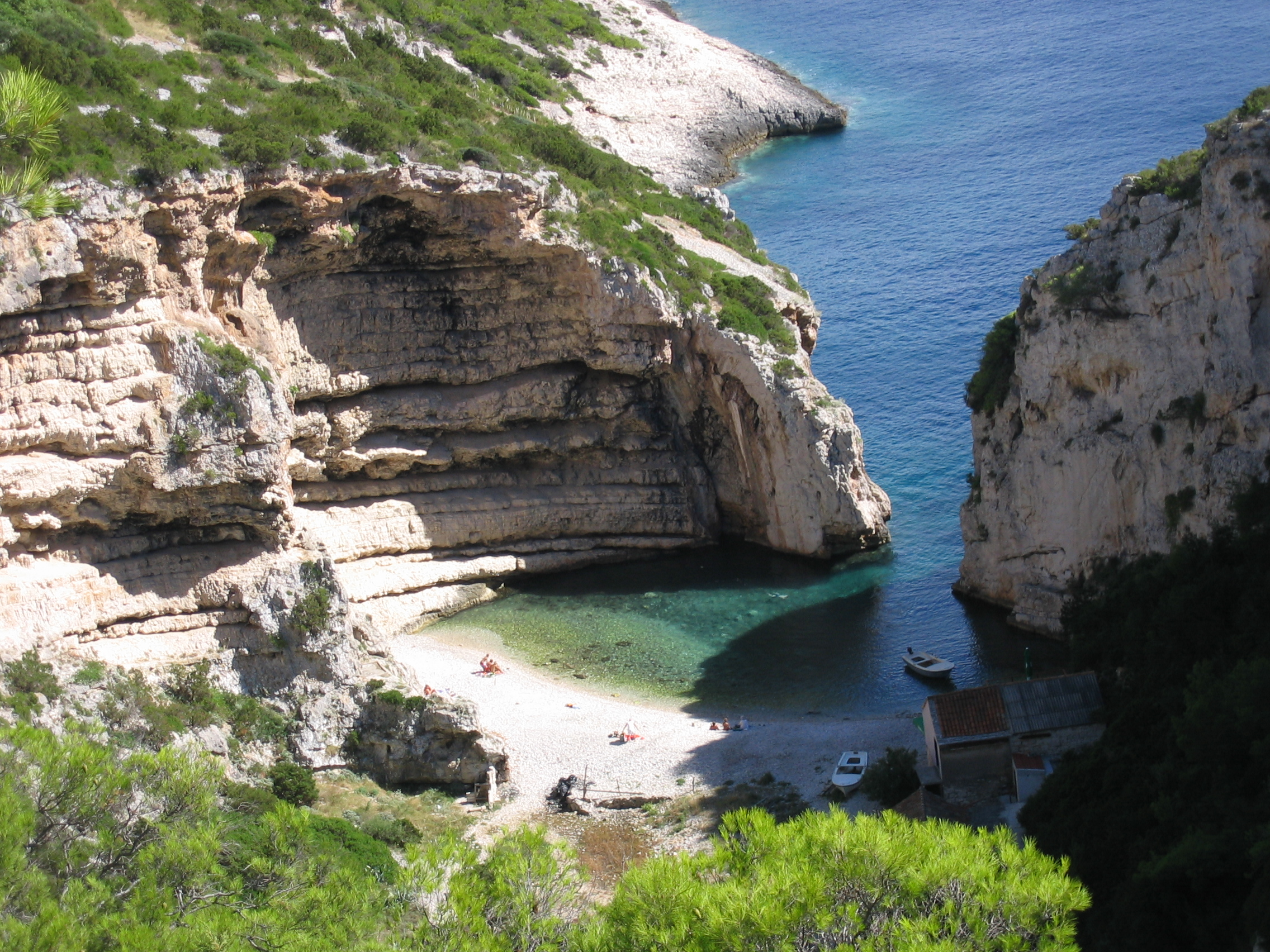
Stiniva Beach and Porco Rosso's hidden beach

Marco is an Italian hero from the First World War and is shown fighting against Austro-Hungarian fighter planes in a flashback sequence. The story is set in Northern Italy, including Milan, and the Italian and Croatian Adriatic Sea east coast. Some locations resemble certain islands of the Italian Lakes. The concealed beach Porco uses as a hideout bears a strong resemblance to Stiniva Beach, on the southern side of the Croatian island of Vis.

Miyazaki shed light on the political context of the making of the film in an interview with Empire. He reflects that the conflicts that broke out during the film's production (such as those in Dubrovnik and elsewhere) made Porco Rosso a much more complicated and difficult film.

Evident historical and political realism aside, at least one scholar has argued that the film's more overt historical references can be understood as representative of wakon yōsai (Jp; "Japanese spirit, Western learning")—a tendency, since the Meiji period, for Japanese artists to paint Europe as spectacular, while simultaneously maintaining the distance necessary to preserve a distinct sense of Japanese identity. "In Porco Rosso," states academic Chris Wood, "Europe is tamed, rendered as a charming site of pleasurable consumption, made distant and viewed through a tourist gaze."

== Homage to early aviation ==
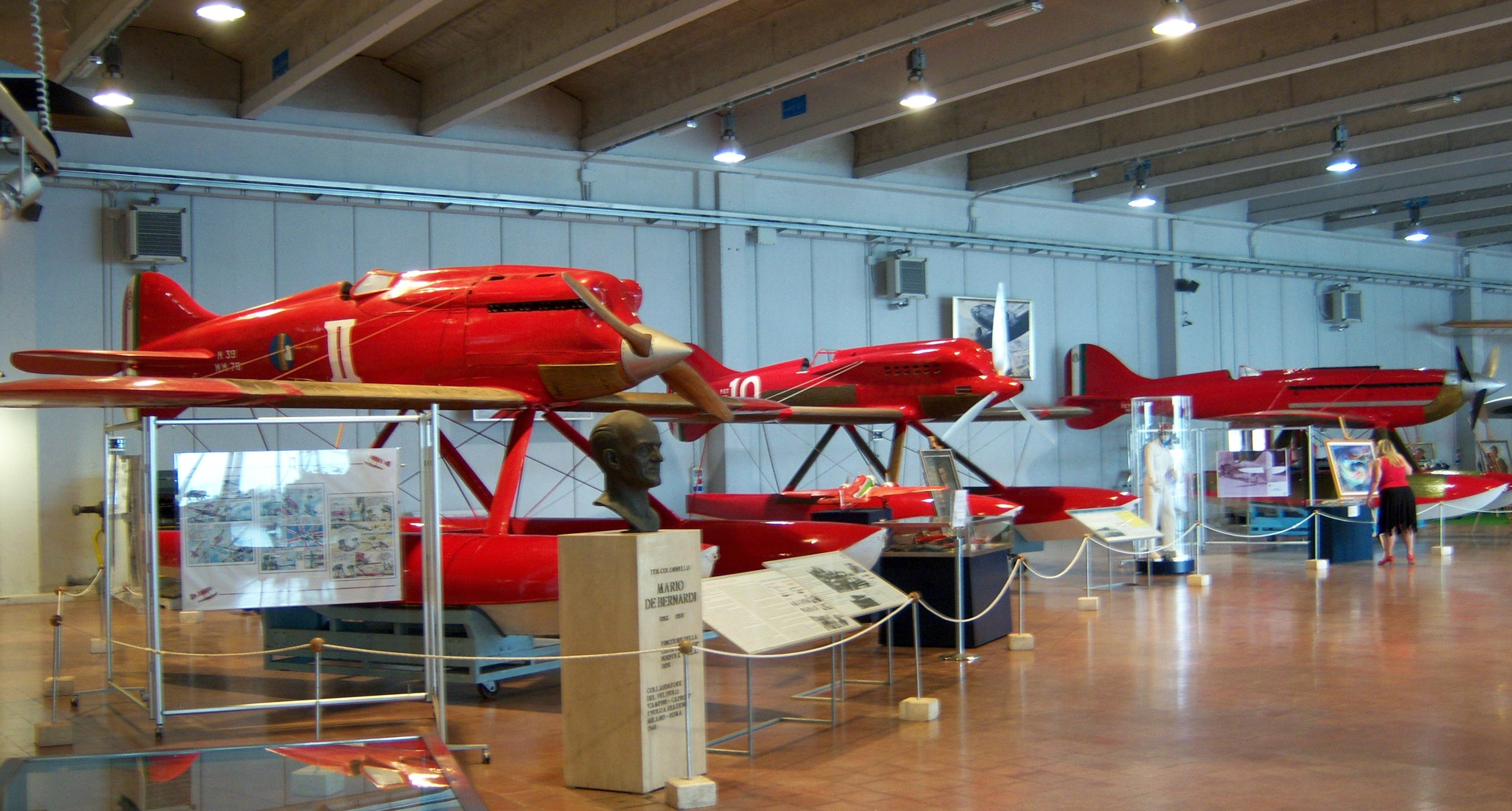
Aermacchi's seaplanes at the Italian Air Force Museum

The fictional "Piccolo" aircraft company depicted in the film is based on the Italian aircraft manufacturers Caproni and Piaggio. The jet shown in the last scene is very similar in concept to the Caproni C-22J, an aircraft designed by Carlo Ferrarin, a designer for Caproni, whose name is notably used in the film for Marco's Air Force pilot friend. The jet-amphibian also has a V-tail, slightly reminiscent of the Magister jet trainer. The Savoia-Marchetti S.55, Fiat C.R.20 and Macchi M.39 are featured in the movie.

Porco's air-force friend Ferrarin was inspired by the Italian Air Force pilot Arturo Ferrarin who flew with an Ansaldo SVA.9 from Rome to Tokyo in 1920. Additionally, the Caproni Ca.309 light reconnaissance aircraft, known as the "Ghibli", was the namesake for Miyazaki's and Takahata's animation studio.

Porco's plane is named after the Savoia S.21, but is based on the Macchi M.33. While in Piccolo's engine shop, the engine to be used in Porco's rebuilt Savoia S.21 also has the word "Ghibli" visible on its rocker covers—in design it is a narrow-angle V-12 engine, similar in form to racing engines of the period. Piccolo mentions that it was used in a racing airplane for the Schneider Trophy race in the year before.

In the early 1930s, Italian seaplane designers set world speed records (such as the Macchi M.C.72 designed by the Italian airplane designer Mario Castoldi). One of the test pilots killed during the attempt to set the speed record was named Bellini, the name given to Porco's pilot friend in the film. Italian top fighter aces Francesco Baracca and Adriano Visconti also appear in the film.

Marco Pagot, the real name of the main character, is also a homage to the Pagot brothers, pioneers of Italian animation (Nino and Toni Pagot were the authors of the first Italian animated feature film, The Dynamite Brothers, and Nino's son and daughter Marco and Gi Pagot were Miyazaki's collaborators in the production of Sherlock Hound).

Meanwhile, the character of Curtis is likely to have been named after the American aviation pioneer Glenn Hammond Curtiss who, along with the Wright Brothers, founded the Curtiss-Wright Corporation. Curtis' airplane is a Curtiss R3C, which was built for the 1925 Schneider Cup race (which Porco refers to when he first meets Curtis). His character is also an oblique reference to Ronald Reagan, in that his ambitions lie not only in Hollywood, but also the Presidency. The rest of Curtis' character appears to come directly from the adventure film heroes portrayed by Errol Flynn at this time—indeed, they share a jaw line—including his buccaneering derring-do, willingness to fight, and overall demeanour combined with romantic ardour.

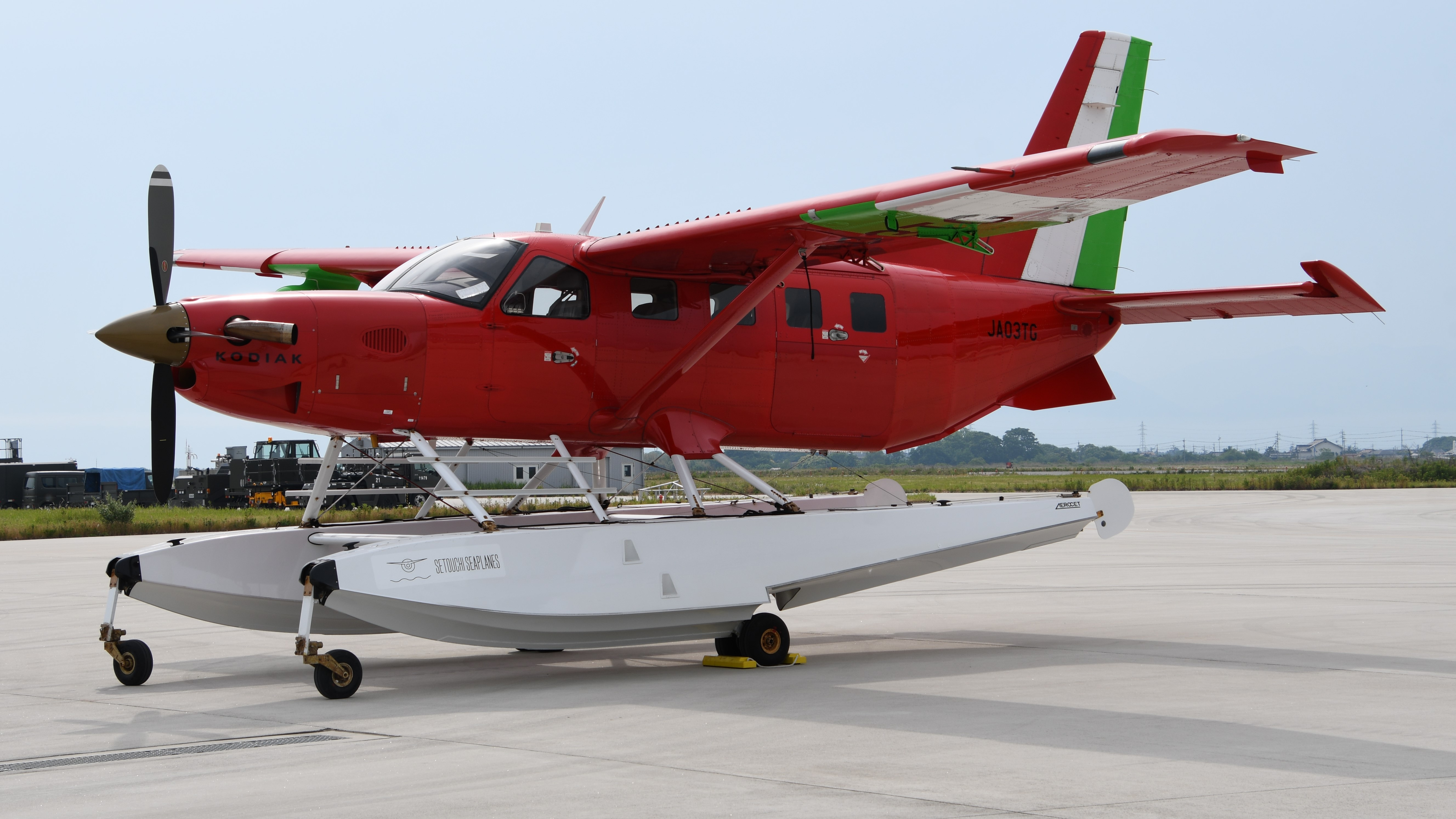
Setouchi Seaplane's Kodiak 100 in L’ala Rossa livery

In 2017, Miyazaki and producer Toshio Suzuki collaborated with Setouchi Seaplanes, a Japanese company flying Kodiak 100 seaplanes in Japan's Seto Inland Sea area, to design a special edition L'ala Rossa livery for Kodiak 100-0143.

Miyazaki revisited the theme of aviation history in his 2013 film The Wind Rises.

== Release ==
The film was released in Japan on July 18, 1992, by Toho and was released on VHS by Tokuma Shoten in 1993. The movie was later reissued on VHS by Buena Vista Home Entertainment Japan (now Walt Disney Studios Japan) on April 23, 1999, and was released on DVD on December 18, 2002. The film was released on Blu-ray Disc on November 6, 2013, with a reissue of the DVD following on July 16, 2014.

Japan Airlines commissioned an English dub that was produced in Japan in 1992 for viewing on international flights. The dub was supervised by Ward Sexton, who also starred as Porco. Although Sexton felt the project was too big for an English-speaking cast in Japan, Studio Ghibli insisted he be in charge. The dub was included in the 1996 Ghibli ga Ippai Laserdisc Box Set and on the 2002 Japanese DVD release of the film, both of which are out of print.

Walt Disney Home Entertainment released the film on DVD on February 22, 2005, and on Blu-ray on February 3, 2015, both with a new English dub featuring the voices of Michael Keaton, Cary Elwes, Susan Egan, and Kimberly Williams-Paisley, which is included on most international releases as well as the 2014 Japanese DVD reissue. This dub was supervised by Tony Bancroft and written by frequent Ghibli dub screenwriters Don and Cindy Hewitt. GKIDS re-issued the film on Blu-ray and DVD on November 21, 2017, under a new deal with Studio Ghibli.

== Soundtrack ==
The soundtrack of Porco Rosso was composed by Joe Hisaishi and released on July 25, 1992. It was recorded with a full orchestra of 70 musicians.

The soundtrack features two vocal songs performed by Tokiko Kato, who also provides the Japanese voice for the character Gina. Miyazaki, a longtime admirer of Kato, cast her specifically for the role.

The opening theme is "Le temps des cerises" ("The Time of the Cherries"), a French song with lyrics written in 1866 by Jean-Baptiste Clément and music composed by Antoine Renard. Though originally a love song, it became closely associated with the Paris Commune of 1871 and the French left-wing political tradition. The ending theme, "Toki ni wa Mukashi no Hanashi wo" ("Once in a While, Let's Talk About the Old Days"), was written and composed by Kato herself.

== Reception ==
=== Box office ===
Porco Rosso was the number-one film on the Japanese market in 1992, with distribution rentals of ¥2.8 billion and gross receipts of ¥5.4 billion, at the time equivalent to $43,000,000 (equivalent to $99,000,000 in 2025).

In France, it sold 167,793 tickets. In other European countries, it grossed $573,719, for an estimated combined total of $44,580,477 grossed in Japan and Europe.

=== Critical reception ===
It won the Cristal du long métrage ("Best feature-length film award") at the 1993 Annecy International Animation Film Festival, and also made Time Out's Top 50 animated movie list. On Rotten Tomatoes, 96% of 25 critics' reviews are positive, with an average rating of 8.2/10. On review aggregator Metacritic, it has a score of 83 out of 100 based on 11 critic reviews, indicating "universal acclaim".

Wilson McLachlan, of the Left Field Cinema, considered it "the most underrated film from the Studio Ghibli catalogue". Jeannette Catsoulis of The New York Times wrote: "Mr. Miyazaki smooshes fantasy and history into a pastel-pretty yarn as irresistible as his feminism." Robert Pardi of TV Guide gave the film 4/5 stars, stating: "Miyazaki pays homage to Hollywood's wartime adventure films in this masterwork built around the adventures of a high-flying pig ... This animated feature's visual splendor is matched by a droll screenplay that takes a sty-side view of heroism ... Seamlessly adapted for American audiences by Donald H. Davis and Cindy Hewitt Davis, this spoof/pastiche of old-movie cliches also soars as a paean to the redeeming power of friendship and loyalty."

=== Cultural impact ===
Porco Rosso and his famous line "Better a pig than a fascist" became a rallying symbol among some Spanish artist circles encouraging people to vote against conservative to far-right parties in Spain's 2023 general elections.

== Possible sequel ==
In 2011, Miyazaki said that he wanted to make a sequel to the film if his next few films following Ponyo were successful. The film's working name was Porco Rosso: The Last Sortie; it was to have been set during the Spanish Civil War with Porco appearing as a veteran pilot. Miyazaki was to create the sequel, although the studio has since indicated that the sequel is not in their current plans.
