= 12.8 cm Pak 44 =

German anti-tank gun

- Pak 44 in firing position
- Type: Anti-tank gun
- Place of origin: Nazi Germany

Service history
- In service: 1944—1945
- Used by: Nazi Germany
- Wars: World War II

Production history
- Designer: Krupp
- Designed: 1943
- Manufacturer: Krupp
- Produced: 1944
- No. built: 51
- Variants: 12.8 cm Kanone 44, Pak 44; 12.8 cm Kanone 81/1; 12.8 cm Kanone 81/2; 12.8 cm Kanone 81/3; 12.8 cm Pak 80

Specifications
- Mass: 10,160 kg (22,400 lb) 12.8 cm Pak 44; 7,000 kg (15,000 lb) 12.8 cm Pak 80
- Barrel length: 7.02 m (23 ft 0 in) bore (55 calibres)
- Shell: Semi-fixed 128x869mmR
- Shell weight: 28 kg (62 lb) (HE); 28.3 kg (62 lb) (AP)
- Caliber: 128 millimetres (5.0 in)
- Breech: semi-automatic horizontal sliding-block
- Recoil: Hydro-pneumatic
- Carriage: cruciform (some were split trail)
- Elevation: −7° 51' to +45° 27'
- Traverse: 360° (some were about 90°, or less)
- Rate of fire: 10–12 rounds per minute 12.8 cm Pak 44; 6 rounds per minute 12.8 cm Pak 80
- Muzzle velocity: 950 m/s (3,100 ft/s)
- Maximum firing range: 24,410 m (26,700 yd) 12.8 cm Pak 44; 12,200 m (13,300 yd) 12.8 cm Pak 80
- Sights: Winkelzielfernrohr 2/1 12.8 cm Pak 80

The 12.8 cm Pak 44 (Pak from German Panzerjägerkanone "anti-tank gun") is a German anti-tank gun used during World War II. It was designed as a result of experiences on the Eastern front in 1943. The German Army came upon the Soviet 122 mm field guns and issued a requirement for a similar weapon. Development initially concentrated on a field gun known as the Kanone K 44. However, once heavier Soviet tanks such as the IS-2 started to appear, the design requirements were altered to include an anti-armour role.

The Pak 44 has short to medium-range performance similar to the 8.8 cm Pak 43, but the 12.8 cm Pak 44 better maintained its anti-tank performance over long to extreme-long ranges – 1,800–2,700 m (2,000–3,000 yd) and beyond - while also doubling as an effective field gun when firing high-explosive shells.

== Design history ==
The choice of a 128 mm calibre anti-tank gun was made because of the availability of tooling due to the use of this calibre for naval weapons. The design contracts were awarded to Rheinmetall Borsig and Krupp. The first prototype guns were delivered for testing in late 1943. Rheinmetall had developed a variant of the 128 mm Flak gun, whilst Krupp opted to design a new weapon from the ground up. After initial tests, the Rheinmetall design was dropped and development continued with the Krupp design. However, the service tests showed that a towed anti-tank gun weighing nearly 11 tonnes was impractical, so the towed design was terminated.

Approximately 50 barrels and breeches were used on existing carriages. The weapon that used the ex-French GPF-T carriage was known as the K 81/1, while the K 81/2 used the ex-Russian carriage. Both of these designs were rushed, and were too heavy, making them cumbersome to deploy. In 1943, a design programme using the Pak 44 as its starting point was started for a gun to mount on the Jagdtiger (Sd. Kfz. 186) and the Maus super-heavy tank. This weapon, of which approximately 100 were produced, was known both as the Pak 44 and Pak 80 / Panzerjägerkanone Pjk 80. The performance was identical to the initial design.

== Performance ==
The gun was fed with two-piece ammunition, the projectile and cartridge making up separate pieces. Due to this, the gun could be fired using three different sized propellant charges; a light, medium and heavy charge. The light and medium charges were normally used when the gun was fulfilling the role of an artillery piece, where they would launch the c. 28 kg projectiles to a muzzle velocity of 845 m/s and 880 m/s respectively. The heavy charge was used when the gun was fulfilling its intended role as an anti-tank gun, where it fired a 28.3 kg APCBC-HE projectile (PzGr.43) at a muzzle velocity of 950 m/s (3,100 ft/s). With the heavy charge, and using the PzGr.43 projectile, the Pak 44 was capable of penetrating 312 mm (12.3 in) of 30 degree sloped armor at 500 metres, 230 mm (9.1 in) of 30 degree sloped armour at 1000 metres, 200 mm (7.9 in) at 2,000 m (2,200 yd), and 173 mm (6.8 in) at 3,000 m (3,300 yd) range.

The 12.8 cm Pak 44 ended up becoming the standard main armament for the Jagdtiger heavy jagdpanzer (tank destroyer) and a tank gun variant was the planned main armament for many future super-heavy tank designs in development during the last months of World War II, including the fully turreted Panzerkampfwagen Maus and E-100, as the 12,8 cm KwK 44 L/55 main gun.

== Variants ==
- 12.8 cm Kanone 44 / Pak 44 (Krupp): K 44 mounted on a Gerät 5-1201 Medium Weapons Carriage. Krupp version. 4-wheeled version where two wheels at one end and two at the other. Firing position allows 360° traverse.
- 12.8 cm KwK 44
- 12.8 cm Pak 80: Pak 44 mounted on Jagdtiger (Sd.Kfz. 186) tank destroyers.
- 12.8 cm K 81/1: K 44 mounted on the ex-French 155mm GPF-T carriage. 2-wheeled split trail.
- 12.8 cm K 81/2: K 44 mounted on the ex-Russian 152mm howitzer model 1937 carriage. 2-wheeled split trail.

== Designations ==
As is common at this time, this weapon underwent several name changes. At various times it was known as K 44, Pak 44, Kanone 81, Pak 80 and Pjk 80.

Equipment numbered in the 8x range were temporary items usually issued in small numbers and not regarded as standard issue service weapons. Hence Pak 80 and Pjk 80 were temporary names, as were K81/x.

Had this equipment been accepted into full service, it would have had a Pak 4x designation attached. The only difference between the Pak 44 and the K 44 was the mode of operation—the weapon itself was identical.
