= Ferd =

Ferd may refer to:

- Ferd (nickname), a list of people with the nickname, usually a short form of Ferdinand
- Ferd Napfel, 1960s American drag racer
- Ferd (company), a Norwegian holding company
- Melvin Ferd III, the hero and title character of in the 1984 film The Toxic Avenger and subsequent works
- Fire Emblem: Radiant Dawn, the tenth video game in the Fire Emblem series
- A title subject in the video The Continuing Story of Carel and Ferd

== See also ==
- Ferd. Thürmer, a German piano manufacturer
- Ferdinand (disambiguation)
- Fred (disambiguation)
