= Ferd (nickname) =

As a nickname, Ferd is usually a short form of Ferdinand. Notable people so named include:

- Ferd Burket (born 1933), American football player
- Ferd Crone (born 1954), Dutch politician
- Ferd Dreher (1913–1996), American football player
- Ferd Eunick (1892–1959), American baseball player
- Ferdinand Grapperhaus (born 1959), Dutch politician
- Ferdinand Havis (1846–1918), African-American slave, politician and businessman
- Ferd Hayward (1911–1988), Canadian racewalker
- Ferd J. Hess (1848–1928), American politician
- Ferd Johnson (1905–1996), American cartoonist
- Ferd Kayser (1833–1919), German mine manager
- Ferd Lahure (1929–2019), Luxembourgish football goalkeeper
- Ferd Wirtz (1885–1947), Luxembourgish gymnast

== See also ==
- Ferd (disambiguation)
