= Frederick Hess =

Frederick or Fred Hess could refer to:

- Frederick M. Hess (born 1968), American education writer
- Fred Hess (1944–2018), American jazz saxophonist
- Fred Hess (politician) (1858–1925), Wisconsin state assemblyman

== See also ==
- Ferd J. Hess (1848–1928), American politician and farmer
