= Nashorn =

Nazi German tank destroyer

Sd.Kfz. 164 Nashorn
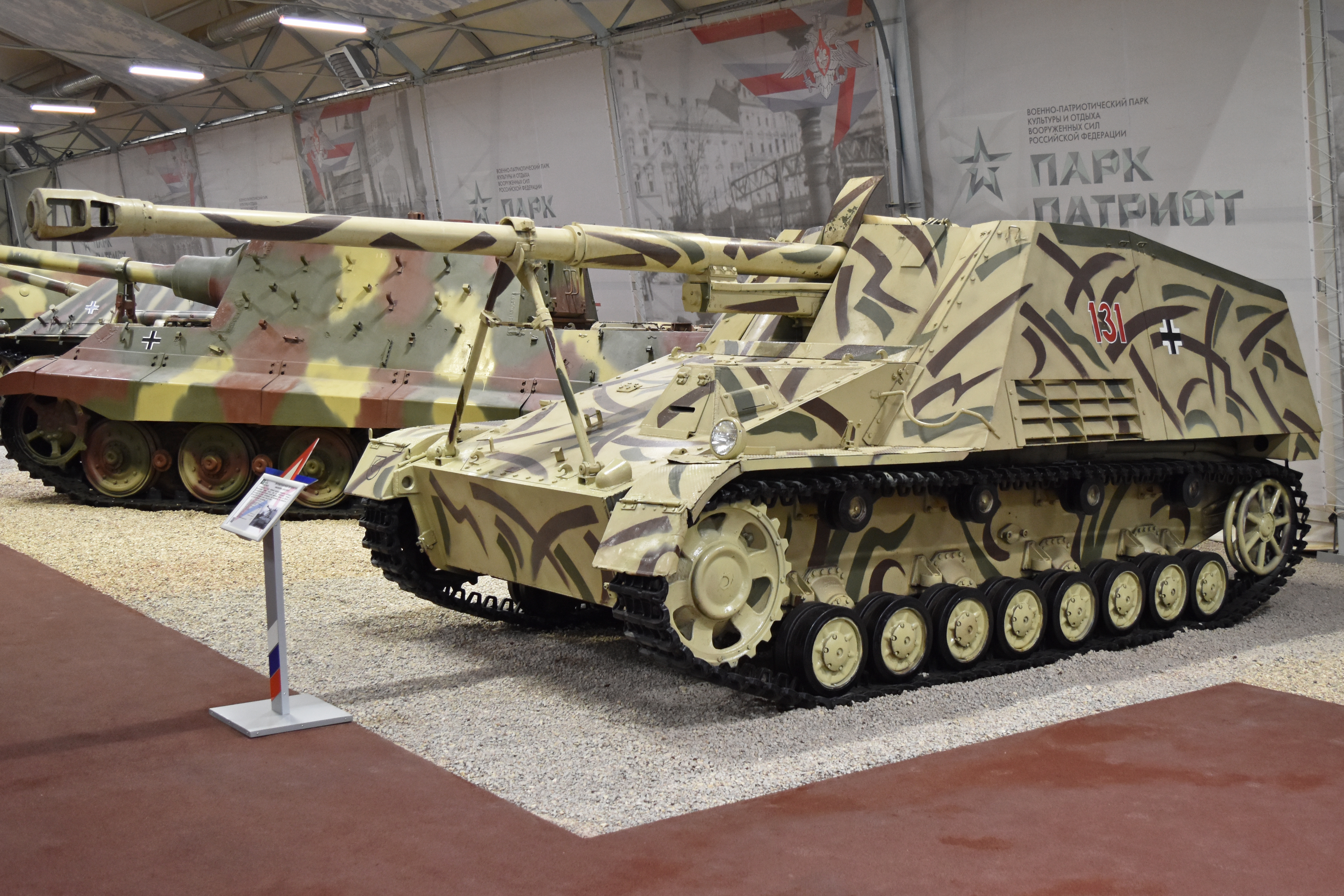
- A Nashorn on display at Patriot Park military museum in Moscow, Russia
- Type: Tank destroyer
- Place of origin: Nazi Germany

Production history
- Designer: Alkett
- Manufacturer: Alkett, Deutsche Eisenwerke (Teplitz-Schönau)
- No. built: 494

Specifications
- Mass: 24 tonnes (52,900 lb)
- Length: 8.44 m (27 ft 8 in) with gun 6.20 m (20 ft 4 in) excluding gun
- Width: 2.95 m (9 ft 8 in)
- Height: 2.65 m (8 ft 8 in)
- Crew: 5
- Armor: hull: 20–30 mm (0.79–1.18 in) superstructure: 10 mm (0.39 in)
- Main armament: 88 mm (3.5 in) 8.8 cm Pak 43/1 gun with 40-60 rounds
- Secondary armament: 7.92 mm MG34 or MG42 machine gun (carried inside) with 600 rounds
- Engine: Maybach HL120 TRM 11.9-litre V-12 gasoline engine 296 hp (300 PS, 221 kW)
- Power/weight: 12.3 hp/tonne
- Transmission: ZF SSG 77 Aphon
- Suspension: leaf spring
- Ground clearance: 0.4 m (1 ft 4 in)
- Fuel capacity: 470 L (100 imp gal; 120 US gal) in two fuel tanks
- Operational range: 260 km (160 mi)
- Maximum speed: 42 km/h (26 mph)
- Steering system: Daimler-Benz/Wilson clutch/brake

Nashorn (German: [ˈnaːsˌhɔɐ̯n], rhinoceros in English), initially known as Hornisse (German for hornet), was a German Panzerjäger (tank hunter) of World War II. It was developed as a stop-gap in 1942 by equipping a light turretless chassis based on the Panzer III and Panzer IV tanks with the 8.8 cm Pak 43 anti-tank gun. Though only lightly armoured and displaying a high profile, it could penetrate the front armour of any Allied tank at long range, and its relatively low cost and superior mobility to heavier vehicles ensured it remained in production until the war's end.

== Development ==
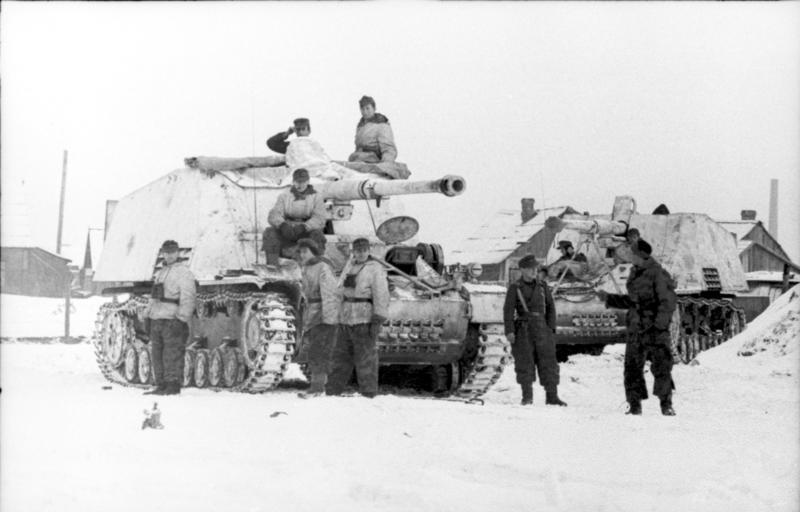
Nashorn tank destroyers on the Eastern Front in 1944

After the first German experiences with the newer Soviet tanks like the T-34 medium tank or the Kliment Voroshilov heavy tank during Operation Barbarossa, the need for a Panzerjäger capable of destroying these more heavily armoured tanks became clear.

In February 1942, the Alkett (Altmärkische Kettenwerke GmbH) arms firm of Berlin designed a tank destroyer using their recently developed Geschützwagen III/IV chassis which, as its name indicated, used components of both the Panzer III and Panzer IV medium tanks. The 8.8 cm Panzerjägerkanone 43/1 L/71 (PaK 43/1) a long-barreled anti-tank gun (also used, as the 8.8 cm KwK 43, for the main armament of the Tiger II tank) was mounted on the rear of the chassis complete with its gun shield, and an open-topped superstructure was built up around the gun to give the crew some protection. The gun had the same traverse and elevation as if it had been on its carriage: 15° to either side and between -5° and +15° elevation. To accommodate the long and heavy gun, the hull had to be lengthened and the engine moved from the rear to the centre of the chassis. The amount of armour provided for the crew compartment was limited. The shielding provided was adequate to protect the crew from blast and small arms, but not armour-piercing rounds. Thus, like the Marder series, the vehicle was not intended to engage in tank fights, but to provide mobility to a powerful anti-tank gun.

This model was presented for approval to Adolf Hitler in October 1942 and entered production in early 1943. It had numerous official designations, such as 8.8 cm Pak 43 (L/71) auf Fahrgestell Panzerkampfwagen III/IV (Sf) or 8.8 cm Pak 43 (L/71) auf Geschützwagen III/IV (Sd. Kfz. 164), though it was also known as the Panzerjäger Hornisse (in English "tank-hunter Hornet")

During the first half of 1943, a new model of the Hornisse was introduced into production. This model altered the driver's front armour plate, along with other minor differences. This model and its predecessor, the few early production vehicles, were almost indistinguishable. It was renamed Nashorn by Hitler in 1944.

Total production of the Nashorn amounted to some 494 vehicles, most of which were built in 1943. In January 1944, Hitler favored production of a newer, fully-casemated tank destroyer, the Jagdpanzer IV, which had a much lower silhouette, thicker frontal armor (60 mm frontal plate), and an effective though less powerful 7.5 cm gun. Though still primarily an ambush weapon, this vehicle was better built for armoured engagements. Production of the Nashorn continued into 1945, although at a slow pace.

== Combat service ==
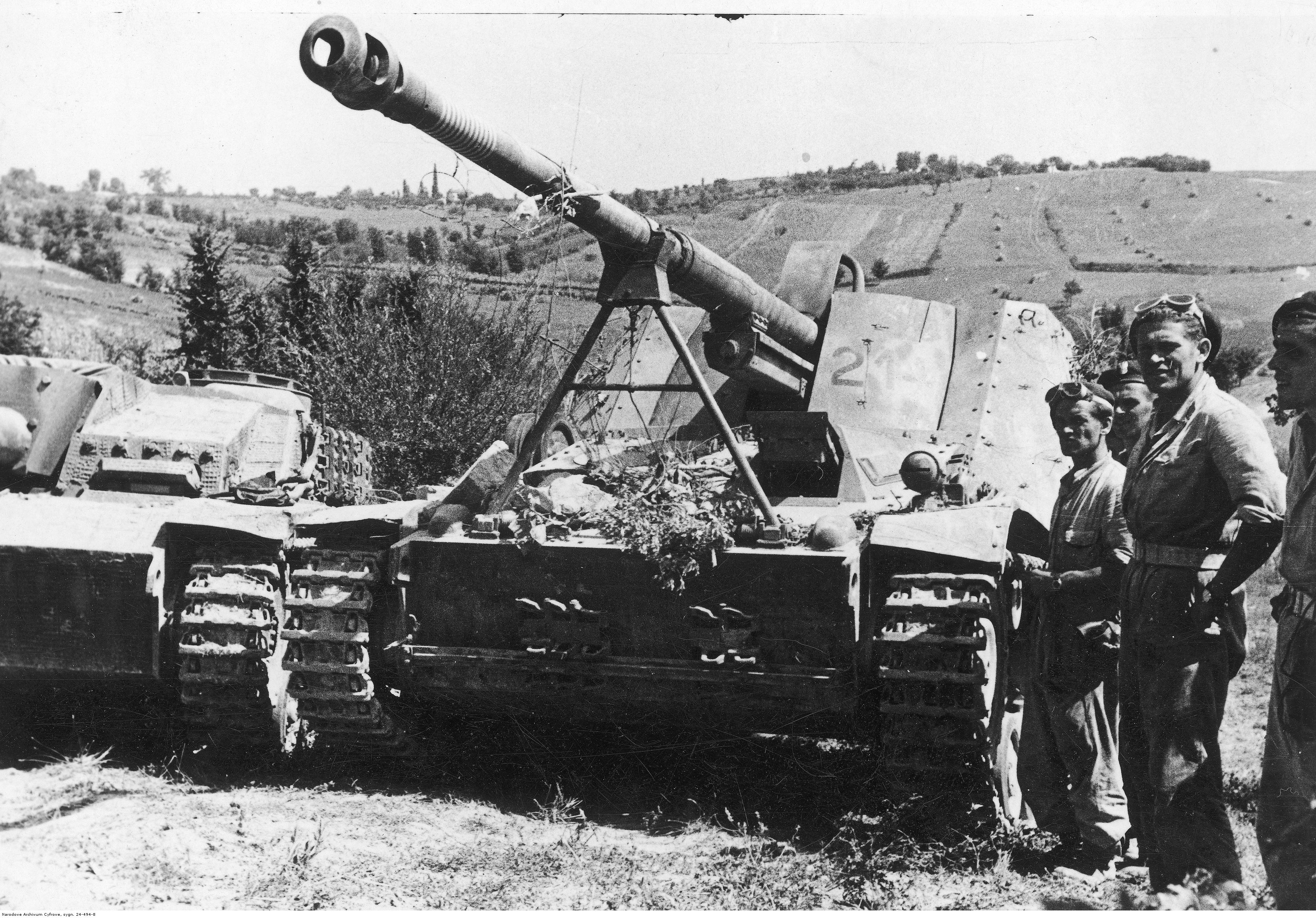
Nashorn captured by soldiers of the Polish 2nd Corps during fighting somewhere along the Gothic Line in Italy, August 1944.

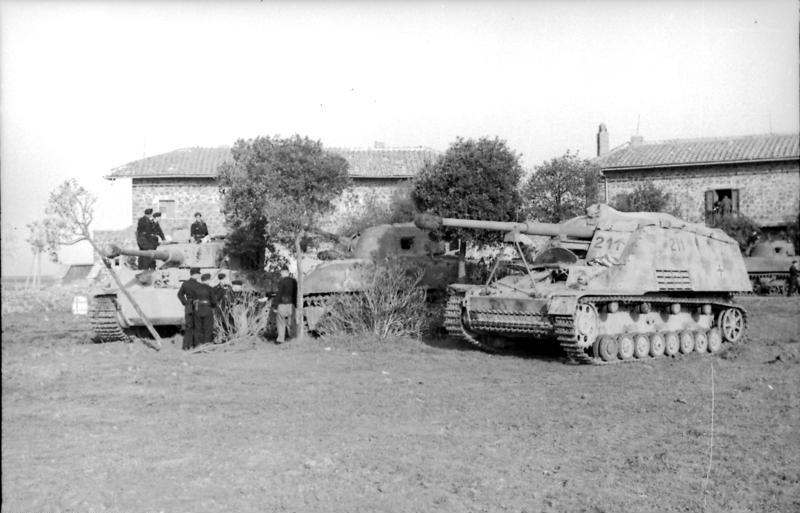
A Nashorn somewhere in Italy in April or May 1944

The Hornisse/Nashorn was issued to the heavy anti-tank battalions (Schwere Panzerjäger-Abteilungen); six would eventually be equipped: Schwere Panzerjäger Abteilung 560, 655, 525, 93, 519 and 88. Each battalion was equipped with 45 Nashorns. Most of the Nashorns in these units fought either on the Eastern Front or in Italy, few having been sent to Western Europe.

The Nashorn's gun was a variant of the Pak 43, closely related to guns used later for the Ferdinand/Elefant, Tiger II and Jagdpanther. Its tungsten carbide–cored round, the Pzgr. 40/43, was capable of penetrating 190 mm of rolled steel armour at a 30° angle of impact at a distance of 1 km. The gun's performance enabled Nashorns to penetrate the front armour plating of any Allied combat vehicle and to engage enemy units while staying out of range themselves, thanks to its combination of excellent gunsights, optics, and accuracy.

The Hornisse/Nashorn made its debut during the Battle of Kursk in 1943, where it performed extremely well. The ability to engage the enemy at long distances negated the disadvantages of its light armour, lack of a roof and a large profile, and revealed that the weapon was well suited to the open and flat steppes that made up much of the landscape of the western Soviet Union. In Italy, however, the generally hilly terrain was not as favourable to the harnessing of the Nashorn's full ability at accurate long-range fire against enemy forces as in Russia.

On 6 March 1945, a US Army M26 Pershing heavy tank was knocked out by a Nashorn in the town of Niehl near Cologne, at a close range of under 300 yd (270 m).

== Survivors ==
There are two Nashorns on display in military museums: one in the U.S. Army Armor & Cavalry Collection and at the new Patriot Park military museum in Moscow, Russia (it was formerly on display in Kubinka Tank Museum).

A third privately owned Nashorn with the hull serial number 310163 has been restored to running condition in the Netherlands. The hull and a number of the parts came from Kaliningrad. In 2019, this third surviving vehicle had reached the stage where it was driveable when it suffered severe damage after being caught in an accidental garage fire. The restoration has made this Nashorn operational again. The engine and steering system are not original due to cost. The engine is a Deutz FL12814 V12 while the steering system was taken from an FV432. The tracks were originally of World War II vintage but they proved too brittle and have been replaced with newly manufactured tracks.

== Armor ==
Thickness and slope of armour
	Front		Side		Rear		Top/bottom
	Thickness mm (in))	Slope	Thickness mm (in))	Slope	Thickness mm (in))	Slope	Thickness mm (in))
Turret/gun shield	10–15 (0.39–0.59) (Note: 15mm after May 1943)	30°					open
Superstructure	15 (0.59)	30°	10 (0.39)	15°	10 (0.39)	10°	10 (0.39)
Hull	30 (1.2)	12°	20 (0.79)	0°	20 (0.79)	21°	15 (0.59)

== Technical data ==
- Tracks: single pin, 400 mm wide
  - Ground contact length: 3.80 m
  - Shoes(links)/track: 104
  - Ground pressure: 0.85 kg/cm^{2}
- Obstacle performance
  - Vertical obstacle: 0.6 m
  - Trench: 2.3 m
  - Fording: 0.8 m
- Gearbox: synchromesh manual with six forward and one reverse gear
- Clutch: Fichtel & Sachs La 120 HDA dry, triple disc
- Primary gun sight: Selbstfahrlafetten-Zielfernrohr 1a, 5× magnification and 8° field of view
- Indirect fire sight: Aushilfsrichtmittel 38, 3x magnification and 10° field of view
- Radio: FuG Spr. f
