= Elefant =

German heavy tank destroyer of World War II

Panzerjäger Tiger (P)
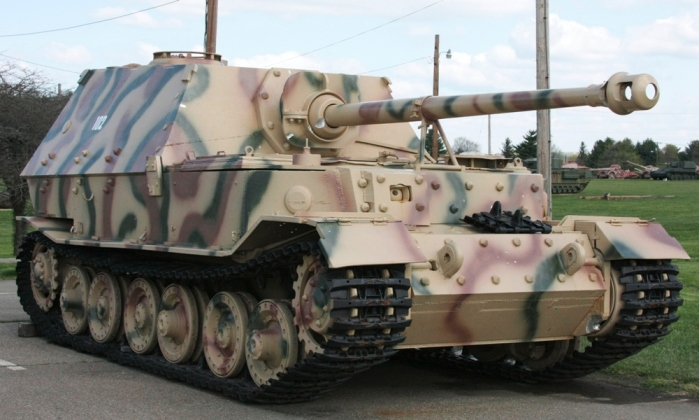
- Restored Elefant at the United States Army Ordnance Training and Heritage Center
- Type: Heavy tank destroyer
- Place of origin: Nazi Germany

Production history
- Designer: Ferdinand Porsche
- Designed: 1942–1943
- Manufacturer: Nibelungenwerk
- Produced: March–May 1943
- No. built: 91

Specifications
- Mass: 65 tonnes (143,000 lb)
- Length: 8.14 m (26 ft 8 in) with gun
- Width: 3.38 m (11 ft 1 in)
- Height: 2.97 m (9 ft 9 in)
- Crew: 6 (driver, radio-operator, commander, gunner, two loaders)
- Armor: 200 mm (7.87 in) maximum
- Main armament: 8.8 cm Pak 43/2 L/71
- Secondary armament: 7.92 mm MG 34 machine gun
- Engine: 2 × Maybach HL120 TRM petrol 600 PS (592 hp, 442 kW)
- Power/weight: 9.2 PS (6.8 kW) / tonne
- Suspension: longitudinal torsion-bar
- Fuel capacity: 950 liters
- Operational range: 150 km (93 mi) road 90 km (56 mi) cross-country
- Maximum speed: 30 kilometres per hour (19 mph)

Elefant (German for "elephant") was a heavy tank destroyer (self-propelled anti-tank gun) used by German Panzerjäger (anti-tank) units during World War II. Ninety-one units were built in 1943 under the name Ferdinand (after its designer Ferdinand Porsche) using VK 45.01 (P) tank hulls which had been produced for the Tiger I tank before the competing Henschel design had been selected.

Following their use at the battle of Kursk, in January to April 1944 the surviving Ferdinands received modifications and upgrades. They were renamed Elefant in May 1944. The official German designation was Panzerjäger Tiger (P) (Note: Not to be confused with either the Panzerkampfwagen VI Tiger Ausf. H or Ausf. E versions of the Tiger I, or the Panzerkampfwagen Tiger Ausf. B (Tiger II)) and the ordnance inventory designation was Sd.Kfz. 184.

== Development history ==
Porsche's pre-Elefant, turreted Tiger I prototype

Porsche GmbH had manufactured about 100 chassis for their unsuccessful proposal for the Tiger tank, the "Porsche Tiger", in the Nibelungenwerk factory in Sankt Valentin, Austria. Both the successful Henschel proposal and the Porsche design used the same Krupp-designed turret—the Henschel design had its turret more-or-less centrally located on its hull, while the Porsche design placed the turret much closer to the front of the superstructure. Since the competing Henschel Tiger design was chosen for production, the Porsche chassis were no longer required for the Tiger tank project. It was therefore decided that the Porsche chassis were to be used as the basis of a new heavy panzerjäger, Ferdinand, mounting Krupp's newly developed 88 mm (3.5 in) Panzerjägerkanone 43/2 (PaK 43) anti-tank gun. This precise long-range weapon was intended to destroy enemy tanks before they came within their own range of effective fire.

The Ferdinand was intended to supplant previous light panzerjägers, such as the Marder II and Marder III, in the offensive role. A similar gun was used in the contemporary, but lightly armoured Hornisse (later known as Nashorn) tank destroyer, and in the Tiger II heavy tank, introduced in 1944.

== Design ==
=== Chassis ===
The petrol–electric transmission made it much easier to relocate the engines than would be the case on a mechanical-transmission vehicle (the engines can be mounted anywhere, and only the length of the power cables needs to be altered, as opposed to re-designing the driveshafts and locating the engines for the easiest routing of powershafts to the gearbox), so without the forward-mounted turret of the Porsche Tiger prototype, the twin engines were relocated to the front, where the turret had been, leaving room ahead of them for the now-isolated driver and assistant-driver only. The now empty rear half of the hull was covered with a heavily armored, full five-sided casemate with slightly sloped upper faces and armored solid roof, and turned into a crew compartment, mounting a single 8.8 cm Pak 43 cannon in the forward face of the casemate. The initial Ferdinand conversions were thus among the first physical examples of what became known as the dedicated Jagdpanzer tank destroyers, all of which had completely enclosed casemates, but most of which were designed with the casemate as an integral component of the vehicle's hull armor from the start; the Ferdinand was more of a cross between the earlier, thinly armored, high-profile, "three-side" (open-top/rear) Panzerjäger and the later, more heavily armored, lower-profile, rear-engined Jagdpanzer. The driver and assistant driver were in a separate compartment at the front. As the engines were placed in the middle, the assistant driver and the driver were isolated from the rest of the crew and could be addressed only by intercom.

Add-on armor of 100 mm was bolted to the front plates, increasing the plate's thickness to 200 mm and adding another 5 tonnes of weight.

=== Drive ===
The two Porsche Type 101 15-litre gasoline V-10 air-cooled engines each developing 310 PS in each vehicle had considerable problems with cooling difficulties and excess oil consumption during testing. An improved type 101/2 engine with better cooling seems not to have been installed. The Porsche engines were replaced by two 300 PS (296 hp; 221 kW) Maybach HL120 TRM engines. The engines drove a single Siemens-Schuckert 500 kVA generator each, which powered two Siemens 230 kW (312.7 PS) individual-output electric motors, one each connected to each of the rear sprockets. The electric motors also acted as the vehicle's steering unit. This "petrol–electric" drive delivered 0.11 km/L (909 litres/100 km or 0.26 miles per gallon) off-road and 0.15 km/L (667 litres/100 km or 0.35 mpg) on road at a maximum speed of 10 km/h off-road and 30 km/h on road. In addition to this high fuel consumption and poor performance, the vehicle was maintenance-intensive; the sprockets needed to be changed every 500–900 km. Furthermore, the radiators for the water-cooled Maybach engines took up extra space in the cramped engine compartment, and the engines often over-heated.

Porsche had experience of this form of petrol–electric transmission extending back to 1901, when he designed a car that used it.

Suspension for the "slack track" equipped Ferdinand consisted of six twin bogies (three per side) with longitudinal torsion bars, without any overlapping wheels or return rollers. There are sprockets at both ends of the vehicle. The drive sprockets are at the rear, while the front pair contain a drum brake system.

=== Armament ===
The vehicle was fitted with an 88 mm Panzerjägerkanone 43/2 gun (early designation 8,8 cm Stu.K. 43/1). This 71 caliber-long gun had originally been developed as a replacement for the well-known 88 mm anti-aircraft gun that had been used against Allied tanks in the Western Desert Campaign and on the Eastern Front. It had a much longer barrel than the L/56 guns, which gave it a higher muzzle velocity, and fired a different, longer cartridge. These improvements gave the 88 mm L/71 significantly improved armor penetration ability over the earlier 88 mm. Although it lost the competition to the 8.8 cm Flak 41 and never became an anti-aircraft weapon, it was turned into the very successful Pak 43 anti-tank gun.

As fitted, the gun was capable of 28° traverse and -8° and +14° depression/elevation.

== Production ==
Ninety-one existing "Porsche Tiger" chassis were converted (chassis number 150010 to 150100). The work was completed in just a few months from March to May 1943. Three Bergepanzer Ferdinands (the recovery vehicle variant of the Ferdinand tank destroyer) were produced at the Nibelungenwerke in summer 1943.

== Combat history ==
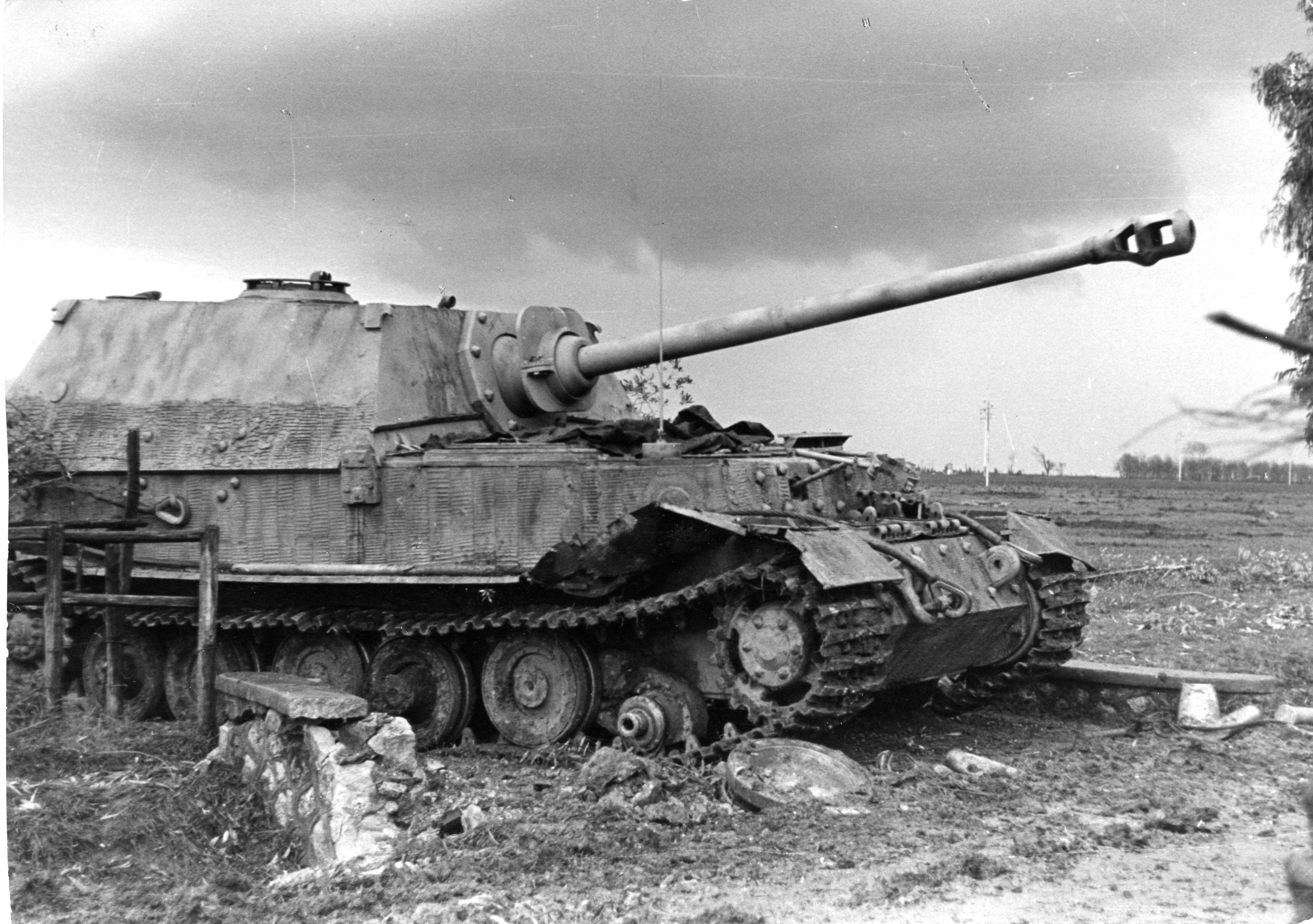
A disabled Elefant in Italy, 1944

=== Kursk ===
Ferdinands first saw combat in the Battle of Kursk, where eighty-nine were committed, the largest deployment of the vehicle during its service.

The Ferdinand was highly effective at engaging Soviet T-34 medium tanks and 76.2 mm anti-tank guns from behind the front line with its 88 mm gun at a range of over 3 kilometres. The most substantial problems during their operational usage at Kursk was mine damage and mechanical failure. Any damage to the tracks or suspension negated the protection of the armor, as crews were forced to dismount and attempt repairs. The immense weight of the Ferdinand made towing difficult: the standard armored recovery vehicle in German service at the time was the Bergepanzer IV, a variant of the Panzer IV tank. Although it could tow a single Panzer IV without assistance it was insufficient for larger vehicles; a Tiger I heavy tank required three Bergepanzer IVs to be towed, and the Ferdinand needed five linked together to pull the vehicle off the field.

In addition, the Ferdinand was hampered by flaws such as the lack of peripheral vision blocks. But contrary to popular belief, the lack of a mounted machine gun was not a problem for the Ferdinand during Operation Citadel. For example, a report by the commander of the 654th Heavy Tank Destroyer Unit stated that due to the noise of the Ferdinand firing and the Ferdinand's effect on Soviet troops, no Soviet infantry was capable of engaging the Ferdinand in close combat. Furthermore, a Red Army commission examined the Ferdinand tank destroyers abandoned at Ponyri and found that they had been set on fire with Molotov cocktails, not by Soviet infantry, but by German crews who had abandoned their tanks. On the other hand, Heinz Guderian himself complained in his autobiography that the Elefant, much as other failed designs, suffered from lack of close-range protection against infantry assaults.

In the initial stages of the Kursk battle, when the Germans were on the offensive, vehicles could be recovered and repaired with relative peace at night; this at first allowed the majority of knocked-out Ferdinands to be rescued, repaired and returned to duty. However, once the tide of battle had turned against the Germans and they fell back on the defensive, with fewer vehicles to spare, functional Ferdinands with minor damage to their tracks or suspensions had little hope of recovery, and crews were usually forced to destroy the vehicle to prevent a mostly intact Jagdpanzer from falling into the hands of the Soviets.

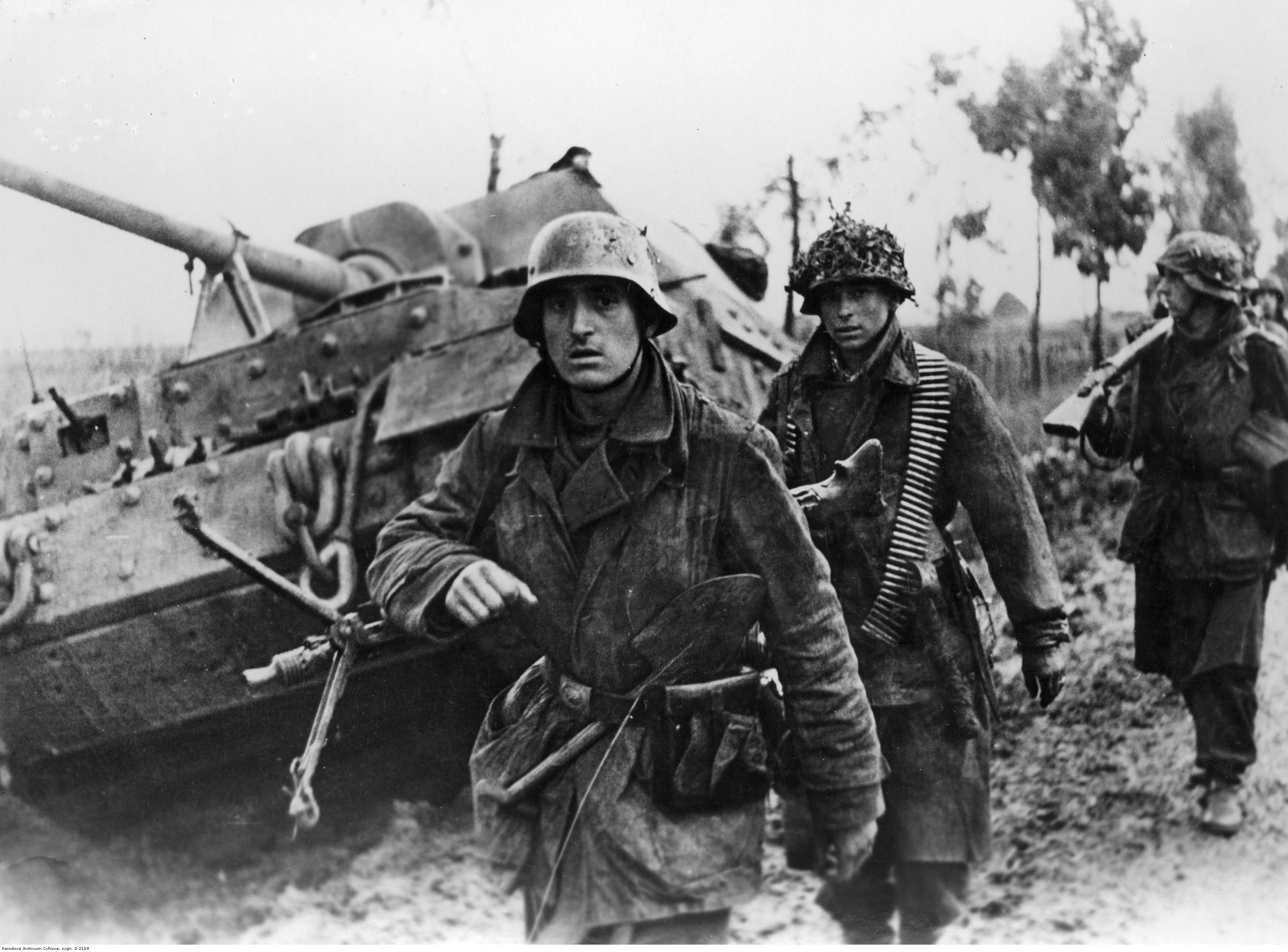
On the Anzio front, March 1944

The units were deployed at a company level, sometimes sub-divided into platoons, with infantry or tanks in accompaniment to protect the flanks and rear of the vehicles. On the attack, this Jagdpanzer was a first-strike vehicle; while in defence, they often comprised a mobile reserve used to blunt enemy tank assaults.

=== Post-Kursk modifications ===
The surviving Ferdinands fought various rear-guard actions in 1943 until they were recalled to be modified and overhauled, partially based on battle experience gained at Kursk. Returned to the Nibelungenwerke factory in Austria, on 2 January 1944, upgrades commenced on 48 of the 50 surviving vehicles. The most visible exterior upgrades were 1) the addition of a ball-mounted MG 34 in the hull front, 2) a new commander's cupola (modified from the standard StuG III cupola) for improved vision, 3) re-designed armored engine grates (for better bullet and shrapnel protection) and 4) the application of Zimmerit anti-magnetic mine paste.

The first eleven complete and updated Ferdinands were ready in February 1944. They were issued to the 1st company of the 653rd Heavy Panzerjäger Battalion (German: schwere Panzerjäger-Abteilung 653, sPzJgrAbt 653), which was immediately deployed in Italy in response to the Allied landing at Anzio-Nettuno. The remaining 37 vehicles were completed in April, issued to the 2nd and 3rd companies of sPzJgrAbt 653, and sent by train to the Tarnopol battles in Ukraine.

On 1 May 1944, the Oberkommando des Heeres (OKH, the German Army High Command) issued an order to formally change the name from "Ferdinand" to "Elefant". This order forbade future use of Ferdinand and even directed units in the field to edit their records. Though there is a belief that the name change was linked to the January–April mechanical upgrades to the Ferdinand panzerjäger, the name change was purely administrative in nature.

Three Bergepanzer Elefant armoured recovery vehicles were converted from Ferdinand/Elefant hulls and issued with the 2nd and 3rd companies of sPzJgrAbt 653 to the Eastern Front in the summer of 1944.

Although the modifications improved the vehicles, some problems could never be fully fixed. In 1944, Elefants served on the Italian front, but were rather ineffective as their weight of nearly 70 tonnes did not allow them to use most Italian roads and bridges. As at Kursk, most losses were not as a direct result from combat, but resulted when mechanical breakdowns and lack of spare parts compelled their crews to destroy and abandon them. The remaining Elefants would be consolidated into Company 614, assigned to the 4th Panzer Army, and saw action during the Soviets' January 1945 Vistula–Oder offensive in Poland, and the last surviving vehicles were in combat at Zossen and two at Berlin itself during the Battle of Berlin.

== Conclusions ==
The Elefant and Nashorn were both superseded by the Jagdpanther. All three vehicles mounted the same gun, with only some minor differences between them. The Jagdpanther—a true jagdpanzer—was a successor to the other two, combining acceptable mobility and good, sloped armour while retaining the excellent gun, mostly solving the reliability, mobility, and/or protection problems that the earlier vehicles had.

== Survivors ==
Only two of these vehicles survived the war.

One Ferdinand was captured by Soviet forces at Kursk, and it was sent to NII BT testing facility in Kubinka, Moscow for testing. It was on display at the Kubinka Tank Museum outside Moscow. Its gun mantlet was painted red. Its chassis number was unknown, either No. 150090 or No. 501.

An Elefant, numbered "102" of sPz. Jgr. Abt 653, was captured at Anzio by the Americans, and is now part of the United States Army Ordnance Training Support Facility's collection at Fort Lee, Virginia. This example was restored to display condition in 2007–2008, as documented on the show Tank Overhaul, but not in its original paint scheme. The Elefant was loaned to the Bovington Tank Museum in Dorset, UK as part of the museum's "Tiger Collection" display from April 2017 until January 2019, and later returned to the United States. This display brought all the members of the Tiger family together in one place for the first time (the Sturmtiger was represented by its gun).

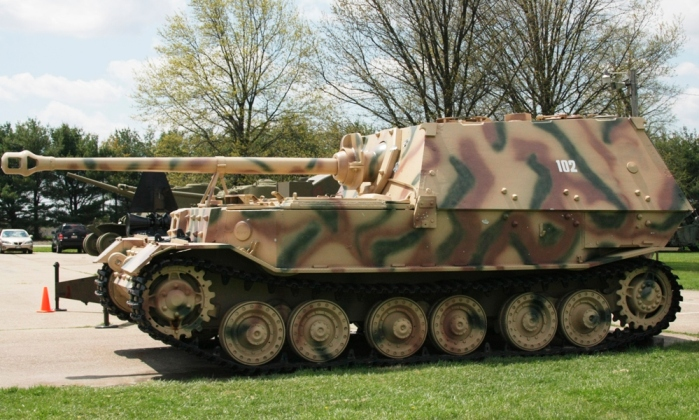
The United States Army Ordnance Training Support Facility's restored Elefant

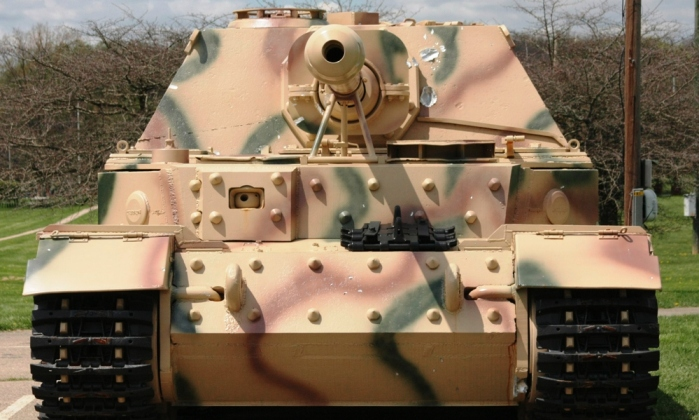
The United States Army Ordnance Training Support Facility's restored Elefant from the front

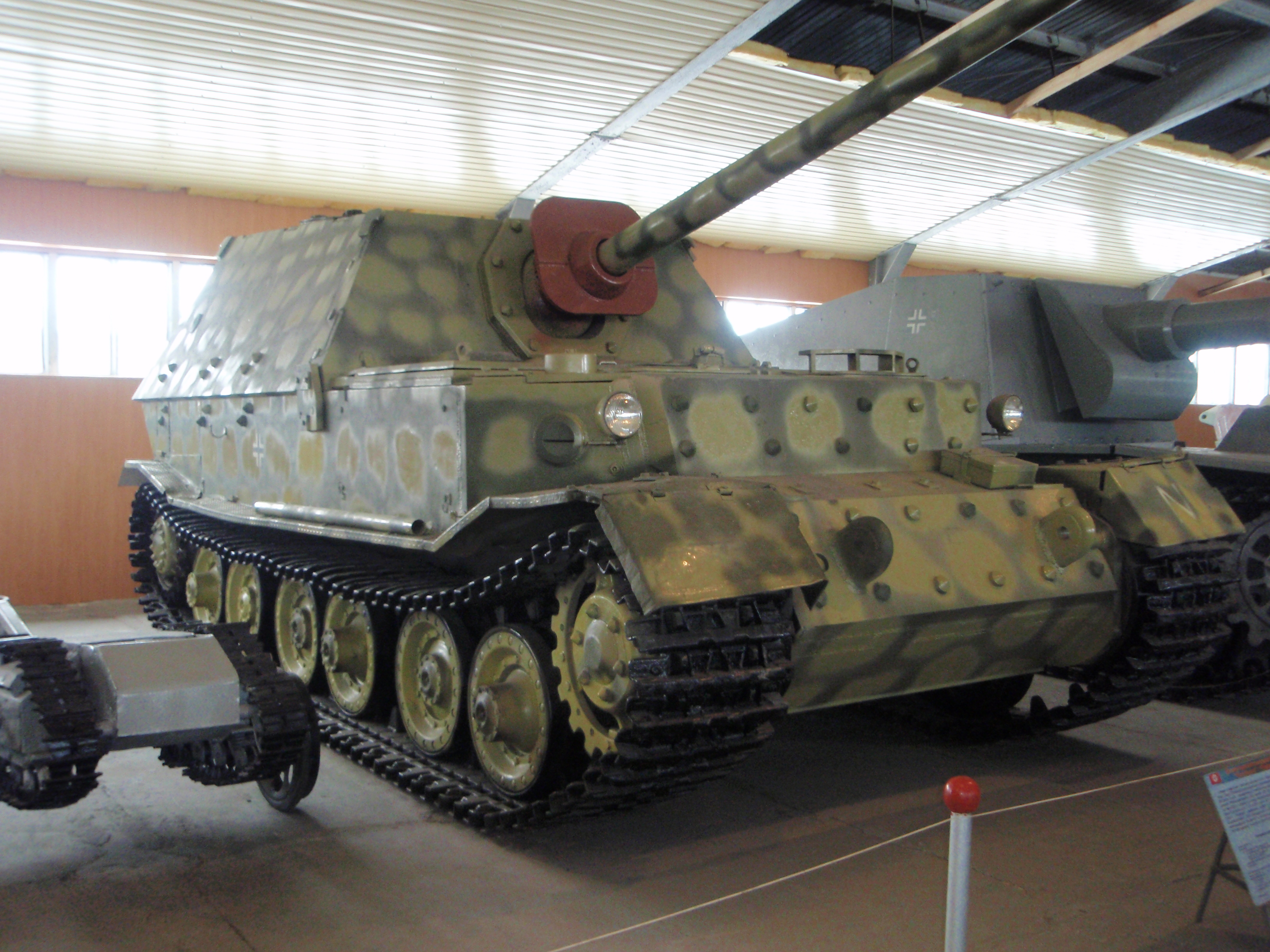
Ferdinand in Kubinka Tank Museum

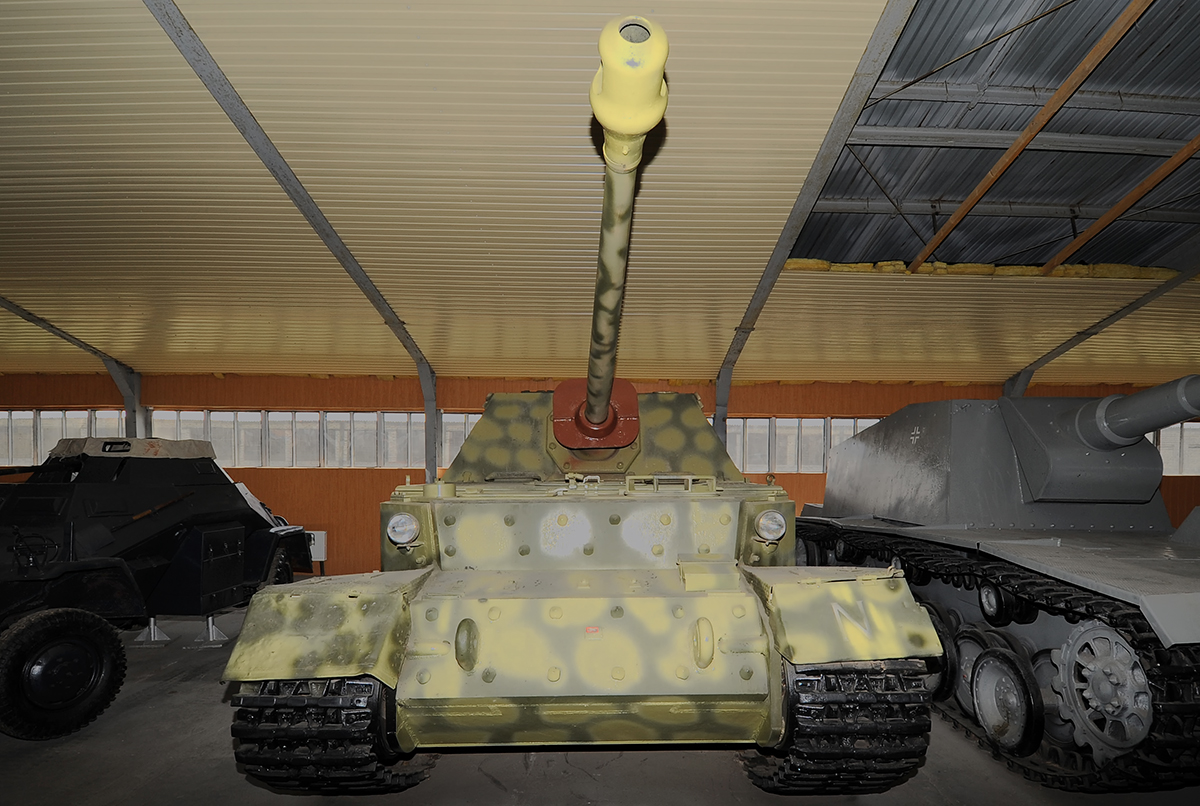
Ferdinand front in Kubinka Tank Museum. This Ferdinand had its gun mantlet painted red.

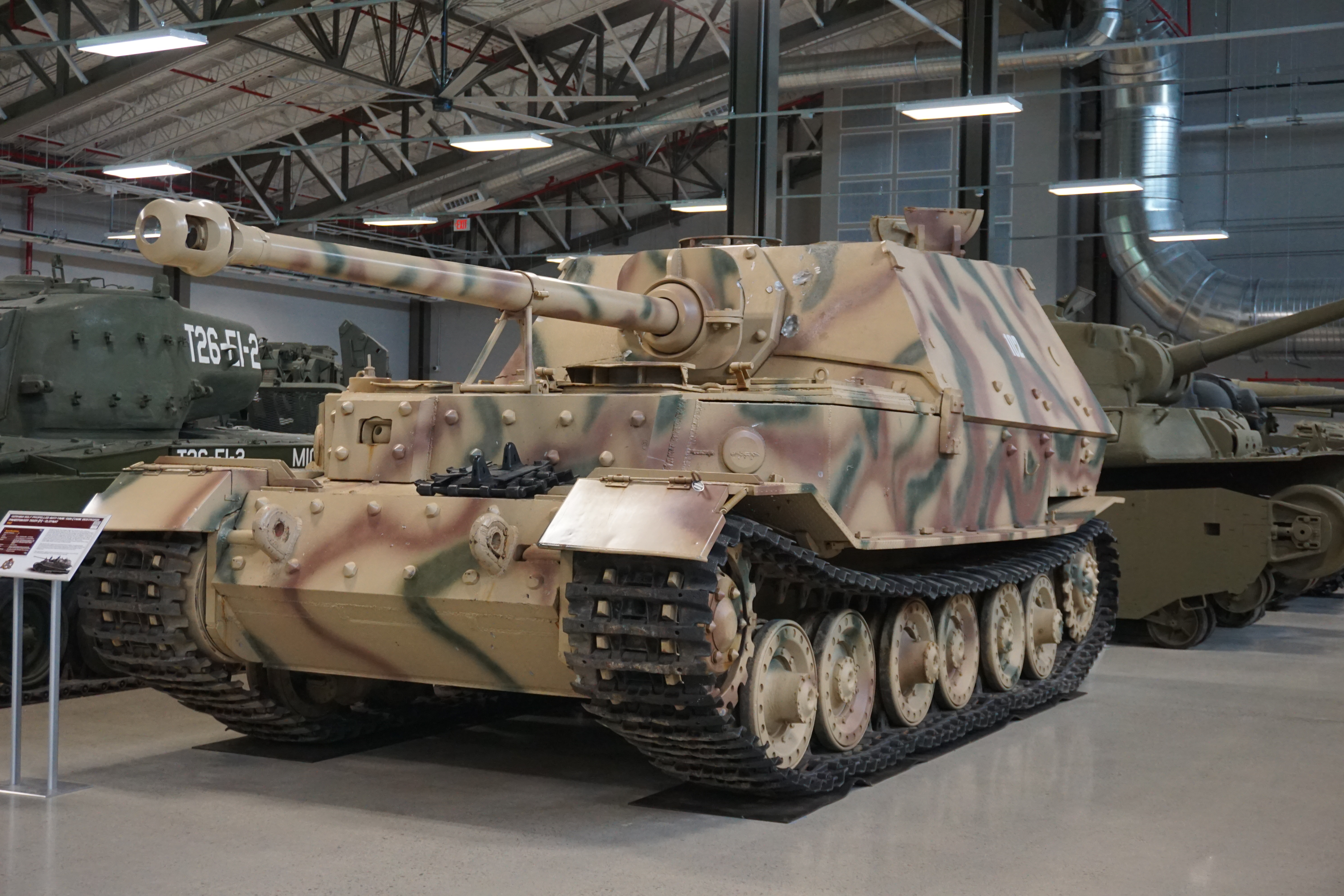
The Elefant at the United States Army Ordnance Training Center, June 2025

== See also ==
- SU-152 and ISU-152, a Soviet self-propelled heavy howitzer which earned the nickname Zveroboy ("beast killer") for its ability to knock out Elefants, as well as Tigers and Panther tanks.
- Jagdpanther
- Jagdtiger
- Nashorn
