= Jagdpanther =

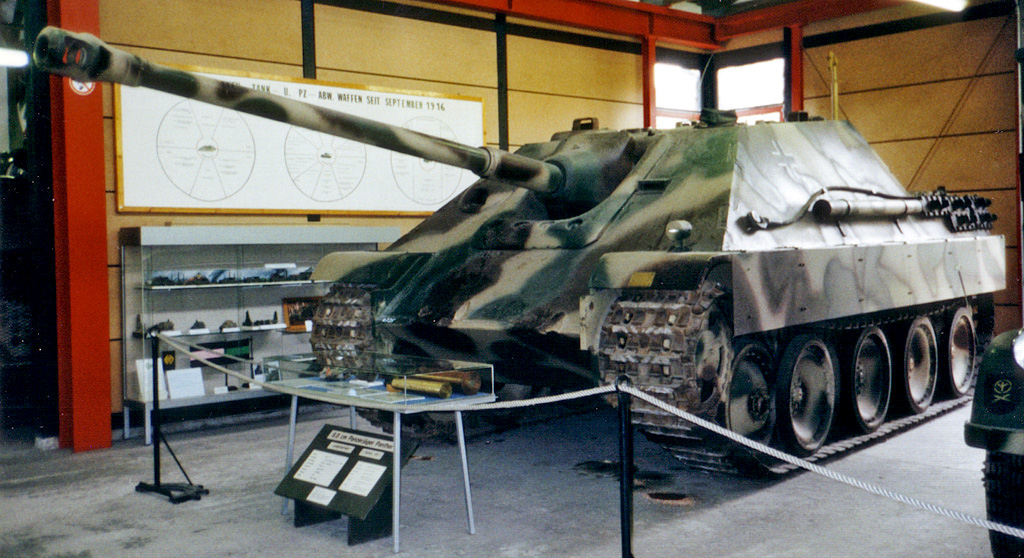
- Jagdpanther
- Type: Self-propelled anti-tank gun
- Place of origin: Nazi Germany

Service history
- In service: 1944–1945 (Nazi Germany)
- Used by: Nazi Germany
- Wars: World War II

Production history
- Produced: 1943–1945
- No. built: 413 (+ 12 postwar)
- Variants: G1, G2

Specifications
- Mass: 45.5 t (44.8 long tons; 50.2 short tons)
- Length: 9.87 m (32 ft 5 in)
- Width: 3.42 m (11 ft 3 in)
- Height: 2.71 m (8 ft 11 in)
- Crew: 5
- Armor: 80 mm (3.14 in) frontal 100 mm (3.93 in) mantlet 50 mm side 40 mm rear
- Main armament: 1 × 8.8 cm Pak 43/3 or 43/4; 57 rounds
- Secondary armament: 1 × 7.92 mm MG 34 machine gun (600 rounds)
- Engine: Maybach HL230 P30 (V-12 petrol); 700 PS (690 hp, 515 kW)
- Power/weight: 15.4 PS (11.3 kW) / tonne
- Suspension: dual torsion bar
- Operational range: Road: 260 km (160 mi); Cross-country: 130 km (81 mi)
- Maximum speed: 46 km/h (29 mph)

The Jagdpanther (German: "hunting Panther"), Sd.Kfz. 173, was a tank destroyer (Jagdpanzer, a self-propelled anti-tank gun) built by Germany during World War II. The Jagdpanther combined the 8.8 cm Pak 43 anti-tank gun, similar to the main gun of the Tiger II, with the armor and suspension of the Panther chassis.

It entered service in 1944 and served on the Eastern and Western Fronts. During the last stages of the war, limited German production resulted in small production numbers, shortage of spare parts, and shortened crew training periods of increasingly young operators.

== Development ==
The Jagdpanther was preceded by two attempts at mounting an 8.8 cm gun as a self-propelled anti-tank weapon; Ferdinand - also known as Panzerjäger Tiger (P) - using the ninety-one leftover Porsche-built VK 45.01 (P) chassis from the Tiger tank competition it lost to Henschel in 1942, and the Nashorn on the Geschützwagen III/IV (which used a combination of the Panzer III and Panzer IV components) chassis. Ferdinand proved to be too heavy, and Nashorn lightly armored and under-powered.

A heavy tank destroyer design based on the 8.8 cm Pak 43 gun and the Panther tank chassis was ordered in late 1942. The full-size model by Daimler-Benz was demonstrated in October 1943 before Hitler. MIAG-built prototypes followed in October/November 1943.

Production started in January 1944; in February, Hitler specified the simpler Jagdpanther name instead of its original "8.8 cm Pak 43/3 auf Fahrgestell Panther".

To accommodate the heavier-calibre gun, as on previous Jagdpanzer-style unturreted tank destroyers, the glacis plate and sloped hull sides of the Jagdpanther were extended up into an integral fixed casemate as part of the main hull to provide a roomy interior. The Jagdpanther had side plate armour thickness increased (to 50 mm) to offset the slightly reduced angle of the side plate to provide enough interior space. Lower frontal hull plate was reduced to 60 mm (2.4 in) while upper hull frontal plate was kept at 80 mm (3.1 in). The chassis armour changes were also introduced on the main Panther tank assembly lines with the Panther Ausf. G in spring 1944.

It was armed with the long-barreled 8.8 cm Pak 43/3 L/71 gun, similar to the main gun of the Tiger II ("King Tiger"). The gun was mounted in a central mantlet, giving it a limited traverse of twelve degrees to each side. A single 7.92 mm MG 34 machine gun was in a ball mount on the right side of the front glacis plate. The machine gunner was also the radio operator. The driver sat on the left. The gunner had a rangefinder and a periscope telescopic sight. The periscope – linked to the gun mount – was under an armoured housing on the roof.

The Jagdpanther had a good power-to-weight ratio and a powerful main gun, enabling crews to destroy any type of Allied tank. Based on the established Panther Ausf G chassis, the vehicle encountered few mechanical problems. It was crewed by five: driver, radio operator/machine gunner, commander, gunner, and a loader.

== Variants ==
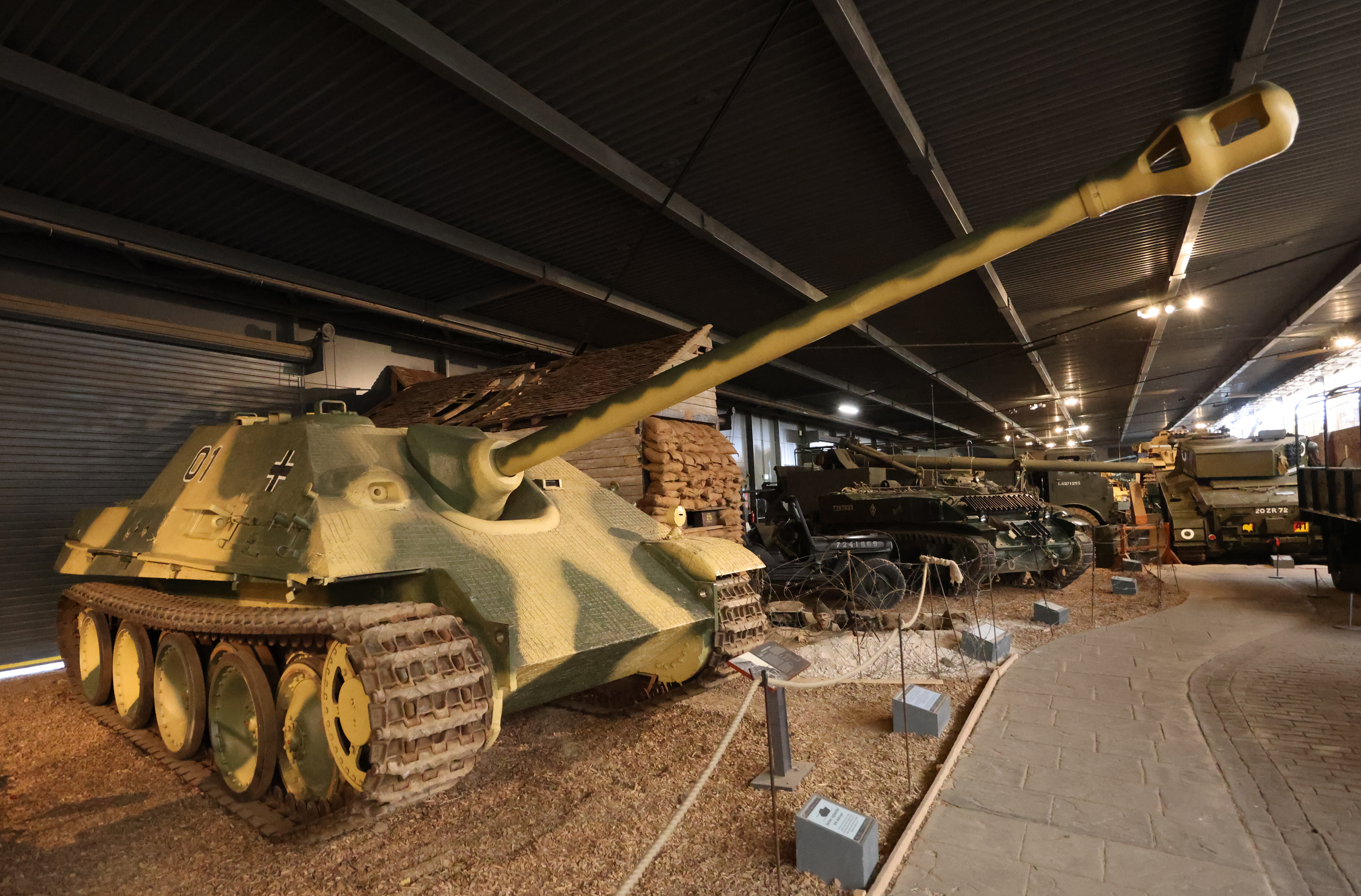
Early production Jagdpanther, coated in Zimmerit, in the Imperial War Museum Duxford

There were two main variants. The earlier G1 1944 model had a small welded main gun mantlet, one-piece Pak 43/3 gun, a modified Panther A engine deck, and had two vision openings for the driver. The G2 Jagdpanther used a Panther Ausf. G engine deck, a larger gun mantlet bolted externally, and a two-piece KwK 43/4 L/71 gun. Some later G1 models had 'hybrid' G2 features such as the larger G2 mantlet as changes to the design were implemented. Zimmerit was applied to G1s up to September 1944, then was withdrawn to decrease production time. Early Jagdpanthers had two vision openings for the driver, whereas late versions had only one. The main gun originally had a monobloc gun barrel, but, May 1944-on, it was gradually replaced by an economical two-part barrel after crews determined barrel wear was uneven.

== Reliability ==
Notes for the meeting with Adolf Hitler on 10.28.1944:

According to an oral statement from H.Pz.Jg.Abt. 654 (currently in Grafenwöhr) Jagdpanther with modified lateral transmission gears (Leutnant Rosenfelder) travelled 400 - 500 km without suffering any damage. However, a great tension has been detected in the sprockets.

— Der General Inspekteur der Panzertruppen Nr. 3706/44 g.Kdos.

Mike Gibb of the Weald Foundation being interviewed by historian James Holland, disagreed that the Jagdpanther was unreliable. He said that the Jagdpanther owned by the Weald foundation, which he had first hand experience with, had done hundreds of miles without any reliability issues normally raised about the tank. When the vehicle was properly maintained, and properly driven, it was reliable. Gibb theorised that claims about the tank being unreliable may have been with some crews who may have been young and inexperienced and not operated or maintained the vehicle properly.

== Production and service ==
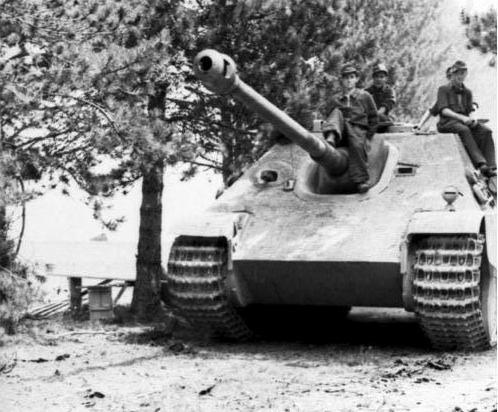
A Jagdpanther in France, 1944.

A total of 413 Jagdpanthers were produced from January 1944 by three manufacturers: MIAG in Braunschweig produced 268 from January 1944 until the end of the war, Maschinenfabrik Niedersachsen Hannover (MNH) produced 112 from November 1944, Maschinenbau und Bahnbedarf (MBA) in Potsdam produced 33 vehicles from December 1944. Planned production was between 100 and 200 a month, but the disruption to German manufacturing made this goal unachievable.

The last 'production' Jagdpanthers were produced at the factory by German staff just after the end of World War II under the supervision of the Royal Electrical and Mechanical Engineers (REME) during the American and British occupation of Germany. Nine Panthers and a dozen Jagdpanthers were produced, then shipped to England for evaluation. A complete Panther and a complete Jagdpanther produced this way are displayed at the Bovington Tank Museum, Dorset, with brass plates on them explaining their history.

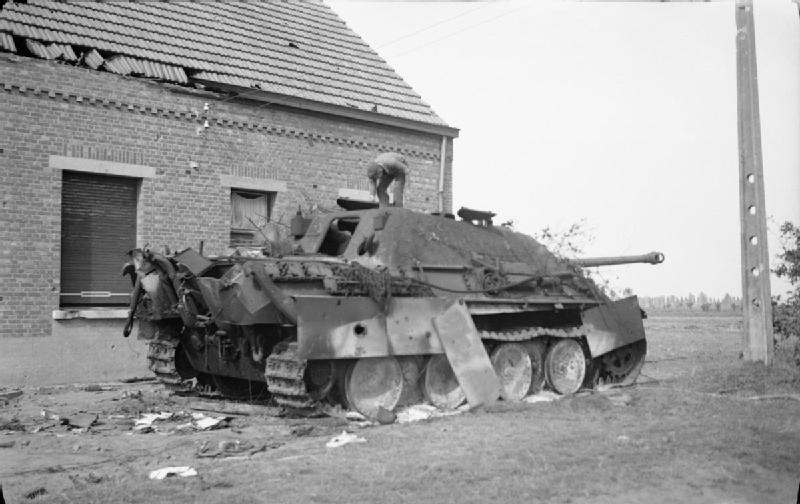
Knocked-out German Jagdpanther tank destroyer near Gheel, 13 September 1944

Jagdpanther equipped heavy antitank battalions (schwere Panzerjäger-Abteilungen) and served mainly on the Eastern Front. In the West, they were encountered in very small numbers late in the Battle of Normandy; the German 654 schwere Panzerjäger-Abteilung ("654th Heavy Antitank Battalion") deployed about twelve Jagdpanthers against the British armed forces. Seven Jagdpanthers of the 1. Schwere Panzerjäger Bataillon 559 were involved in the Battle of Geel in September 1944. Later, significant numbers were concentrated in the West for the Ardennes Offensive.

== Survivors ==
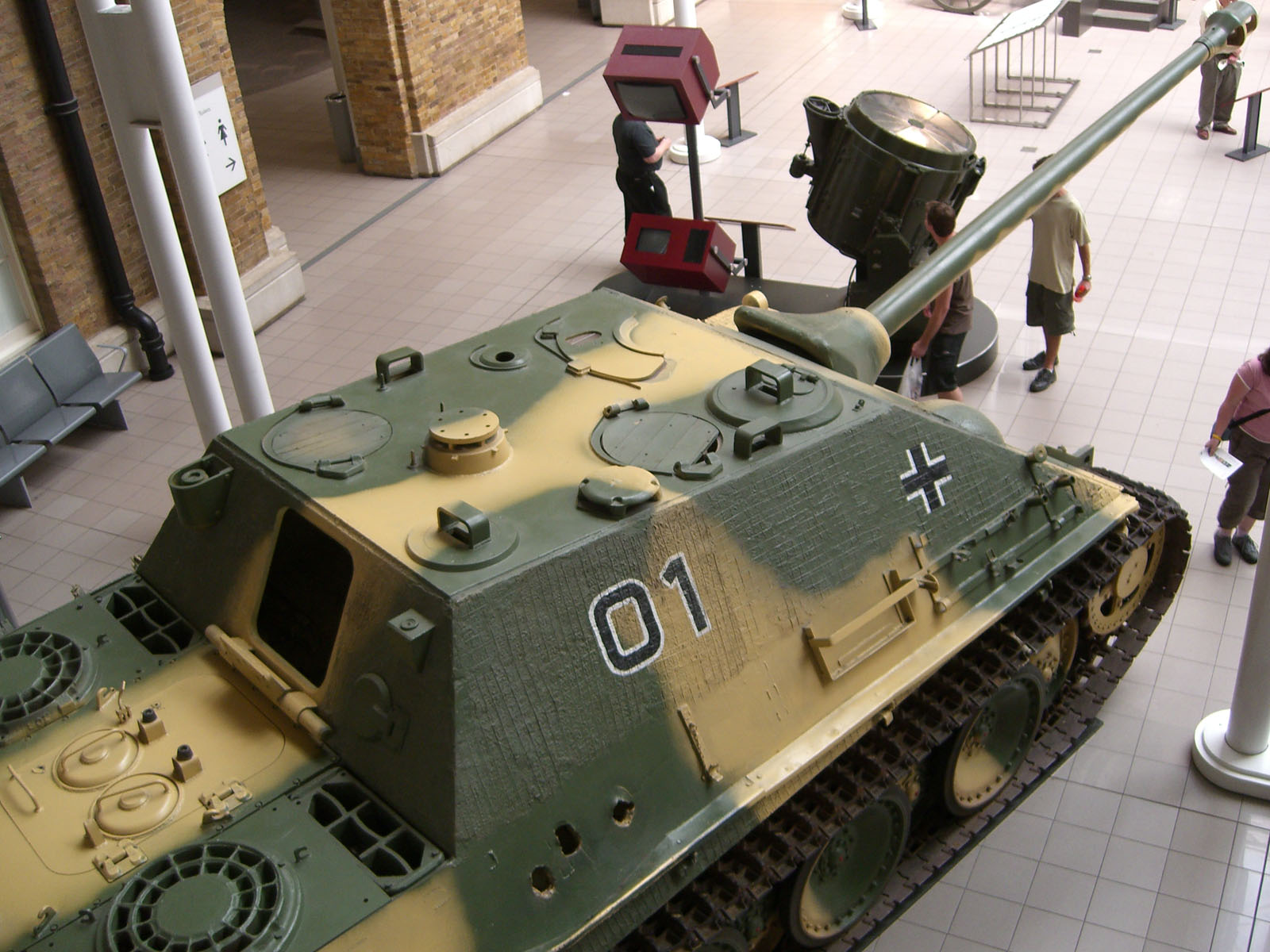
Jagdpanther at Imperial War Museum (London), from above. Note the three shell holes in the side. The rear hatch of the casemate is missing.

Four surviving Jagdpanthers are restored to running condition, one each at the Deutsches Panzermuseum at Munster and the Wehrtechnische Studiensammlung (WTS) at Koblenz. The Weald Foundation in the UK restored one Jagdpanther to running condition and has a second undergoing restoration. The Imperial War Museum at Duxford, UK has restored a Panzerbefehlswagen Jagdpanther to running condition.

Seven surviving Jagdpanthers are displayed at:

- Bovington Tank Museum, Dorset, UK. One of those assembled by the British Army Royal Electrical and Mechanical Engineers for trials, late production model.
- Imperial War Museum Duxford, Cambridgeshire, UK. An early production Panzerbefehlswagen variant, with three shell holes on the right side of the engine compartment with the left side, sectioned and opened to public view. Provenance is uncertain but claimed to be one knocked out during the battle of Hechtel, Belgium by Hugh Griffiths, previously displayed at Imperial War Museum London.
- Kubinka Tank Museum, Moscow, Russia
- Musée des Blindés in Saumur, France
- Sinsheim Auto & Technik Museum, Sinsheim, Germany
- Panzermuseum Thun, Thun, Switzerland
- U.S. Army Armor & Cavalry Collection, Fort Benning, Georgia, USA
- The Australian Armour and Artillery Museum, Cairns QLD, completed the restoration of a Jagdpanther from battlefield relics
- The Wheatcroft Collection, Leicestershire, England owns sufficient parts to restore another but financial pressures have limited their capacity to pay for the restoration

== See also ==
- SU-100
- T26E4
- Elefant, another enclosed German tank destroyer mounting the PaK 43.
- List of WWII Maybach engines
