= 105 mm gun T8 =

105mm gun T8 on carriage T19
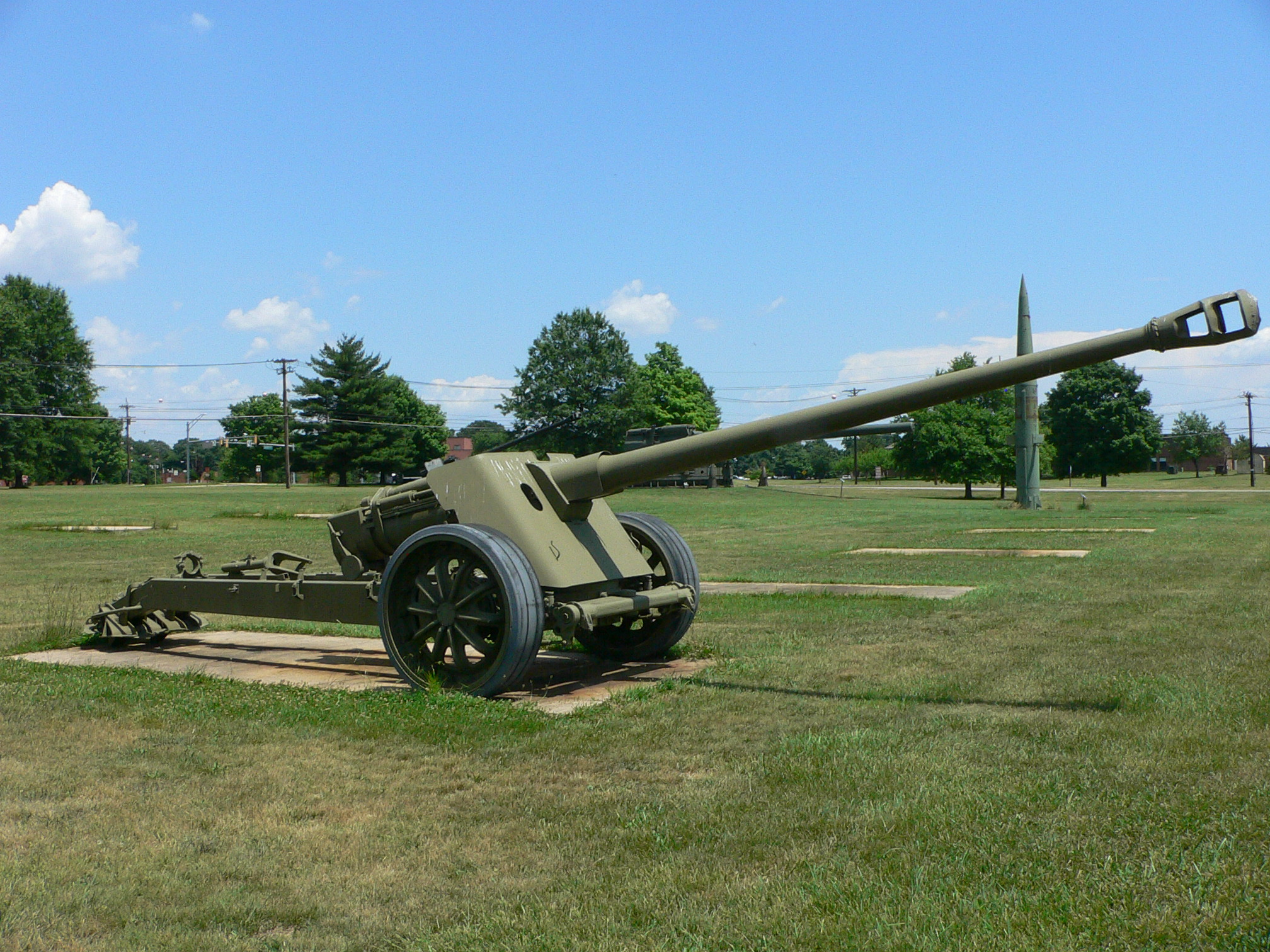
- Type: Anti-tank gun
- Place of origin: United States

Service history
- Used by: United States

Production history
- Designed: 1944–1946
- No. built: 2 pilot models

Specifications
- Mass: 8 short tons (16,000 lbs/7,257 kg)
- Barrel length: 6,825 mm (22.39 ft) L/65
- Shell weight: 17.7 kilograms (39 lb)
- Caliber: 105 mm (4.13 in)
- Breech: vertical block
- Carriage: Split trail
- Muzzle velocity: 914 metres per second (3,000 ft/s)
- Maximum firing range: 26,690 m (29,188 yds)

105mm gun T8 was an anti-tank gun developed in the United States in mid-1940s. This gun's design was influenced by German 88 mm Pak 43/41 anti-tank guns captured by the U.S. Army in France. The development started in October 1944; the gun reached trials in February 1946. Soon afterwards the project was cancelled.

== Design ==
In December, 1942, Allied forces reported that new German armored vehicle designs were resistant to 57 mm anti-tank guns, the largest anti-tank gun available. The US Ordnance Department began preliminary studies on a gun design similar to the German 88 mm Pak 43/41 anti-aircraft gun which was then successfully being used as an anti-tank gun. The first proposal was a combination of the 90 mm M1 Anti-aircraft gun mated to the M2 recoil mechanism from the M2A1 105 mm howitzer. The example was designated 90 mm anti-tank gun T8 on carriage T5.

The T5 gun carriage proved unacceptable due to structural weaknesses found while towing off-road. After two redesigned carriages were tested, the T5E2 was classified as limited standard. After additional trials at Aberdeen Proving Grounds, the T8 gun was found to be too heavy. Alternative carriages were tested, with no carriage found acceptable.

Two new gun/carriages were proposed and tested. The final design selected was the T20E1 gun with the T15 carriage. Three T8 guns were completed in 1944, and a production batch of 400 was ordered. One of the three guns was sent to Europe with the Zebra mission in February, 1945. The Zebra team was sent to the ETO to respond to the criticism of the inadequate anti-tank guns that were then in service.

In early 1945 the entire anti-tank gun issue was re-examined to evaluate the need for large-bore anti-tank guns, as the need in the Pacific did not exist as Japanese armor could easily be penetrated by 37 mm and 57 mm M1 anti-tank guns then available. The Panzerkampfwagen Tiger Ausf. B (King Tiger) and Panzerjäger Tiger Ausf. B (Jagdtiger) were found to be armored beyond the anti-tank guns then in use or proposed. Work was started on a 105 mm version of the T8 using the T19 split trail carriage in October 1944.

The T8 105 mm anti-tank gun weighed 8 short tons (16,000 lbs/7,257 kg) It had a split trail carriage and magnesium wheels with synthetic rubber tires. In transportation, the mount could be rotated 180 degrees in order to reduce the length of the piece. The gun fired a 17.7 kg (39 lbs) armor-piercing projectile at 914 m/s (3,000 ft/s), resulting in the penetration of 210 mm (8.27 in) at 1,000 m (1,093 yds), 0 degrees.

== Display ==
Two pilot guns and carriages were built; one of those is on display in the United States Army Ordnance Museum, Aberdeen, Maryland, United States.

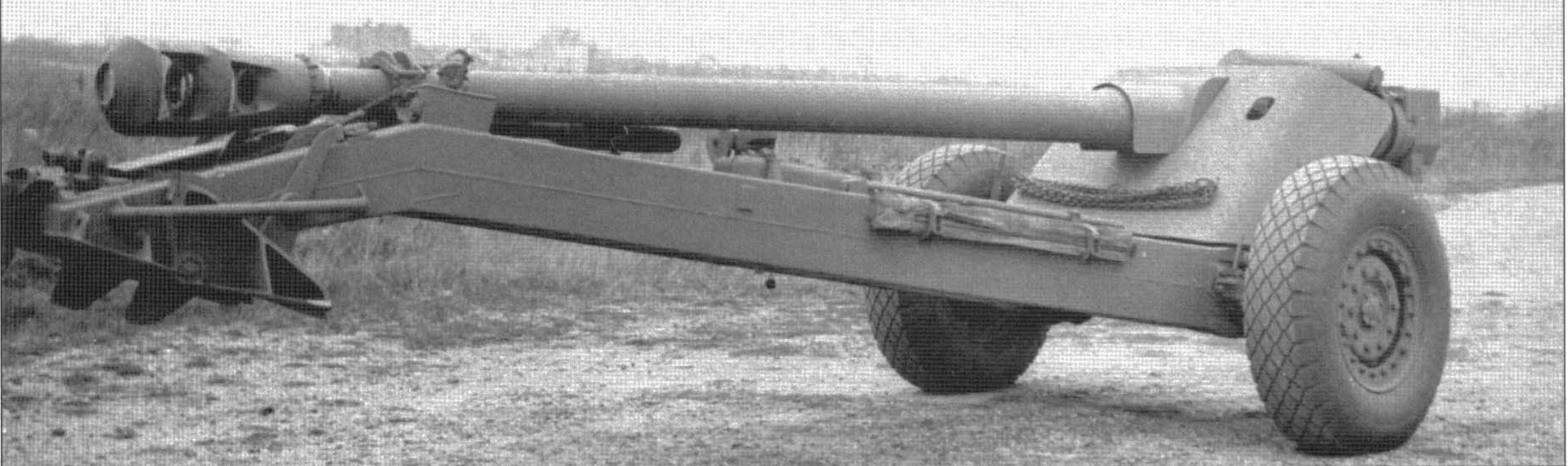
Prototype 105 mm T8 Anti-tank gun with carriage T17 in travel mode, with early style combat wheels prior to change to magnesium wheels.

== See also ==
- 12.8 cm Pak 44
- anti-tank gun
- 2.8 cm sPzB 41
- 37 mm gun M3
