= 8.8 cm Pak 43 =

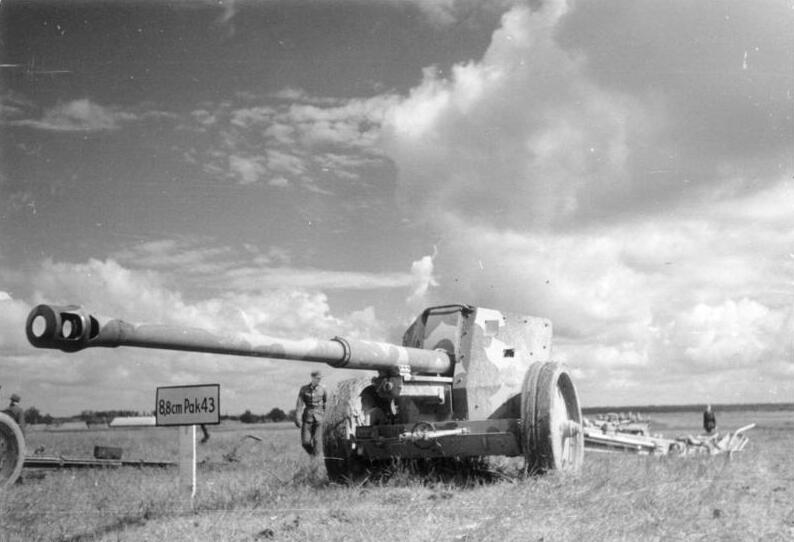
- 8.8 cm Pak 43/41 on display at a weapons show on the northern sector of the Eastern Front in 1943.
- Type: Anti-tank gun
- Place of origin: Germany

Service history
- In service: 1943–1945
- Used by: Germany; Hungary
- Wars: World War II

Production history
- Designer: Krupp
- Manufacturer: Krupp; Rheinmetall-Borsig; Henschel & Son
- Unit cost: 26,000 RM
- Produced: 1943–1945
- No. built: ~2,100
- Variants: Pak 43; Pak 43/41; KwK 43

Specifications
- Mass: 3,650 kg (8,050 lb) Pak 43
- Barrel length: 628 cm (20 ft 7 in) bore (71 calibres) Pak 43
- Crew: 6+
- Shell: 88 × 822mm R
- Shell weight: 7.3 kg (16 lb) Armor-piercing composite rigid (APCR) Pzgr 40/43
- Caliber: 88 mm (3.46 in)
- Breech: Semi-automatic vertical sliding-block
- Recoil: Hydro-pneumatic
- Carriage: Cruciform mount Pak 43; Split trail Pak 43/41
- Elevation: -8° to +40° Pak 43 -5° to +38° Pak 43/41
- Traverse: 360° Pak 43; 56° Pak 43/41
- Rate of fire: 6–10 rounds per minute
- Muzzle velocity: 1,030 m/s (3,400 ft/s) Pzgr 40/43
- Maximum firing range: 15,150 m (49,705 ft) Pak 43

The Pak 43 (Panzerabwehrkanone 43 and Panzerjägerkanone 43) was a German 8.8 cm anti-tank gun developed by Krupp in competition with the Rheinmetall 8.8 cm Flak 41 anti-aircraft gun and used during World War II. The Pak 43 was the most powerful anti-tank gun of the Wehrmacht to see service in significant numbers, also serving in modified form as the 8.8 cm KwK 43 main gun on the Tiger II tank, the open-top Nashorn and fully enclosed, casemate-hulled Elefant and Jagdpanther tank destroyers.

The improved 8.8 cm gun was fitted with a semi-automatic vertical breech mechanism that greatly reduced recoil. It could also be fired electrically while on its wheels. It had a very flat trajectory out to 910 m (1,000 yd), making it easier for the gunner to hit targets at longer ranges as fewer corrections in elevation were needed. The gun had exceptional penetration and could defeat the frontal armour of any Allied tank to see service during the war at long range, even the Soviet IS-2 tanks and IS chassis-based tank destroyers. The gun's maximum firing range exceeded 15 km (9.3 mi).

== Design ==
KwK 43 and Pak 43s were initially manufactured with monobloc barrels but the extremely high muzzle velocity and operating pressures caused rapid barrel wear, resulting in a change to a two-piece barrel. This did not affect performance but made replacing a worn out barrel much faster and easier than before. A new PzGr.39/43 APCBC-HE projectile was designed, which, apart from the addition of much wider driving bands, was identical to the older 10.2 kg (22 lb) PzGr.39-1 APCBC-HE projectile used by the 8.8 cm KwK 36 and Pak 43 guns. The wider driving bands resulted in an increased weight to 10.4 kg (23 lb) for the PzGr.39/43. The older PzGr.39-1 was used for the KwK & Pak 43 before new PzGr.39/43 rounds came into use but only if the gun had fired no more than 500 rounds. Over this, the expected barrel wear combined with the narrow driving bands could lead to a loss of pressure. The new PzGr.39/43 could be fired without loss of pressure until the barrel was worn out, thus requiring no restriction.

PzGr.39-1 FES & Al all up weight: 10.2 kg (9.87 kg without fuse & bursting charge)

PzGr.39/43 FES & Al all up weight: 10.4 kg (10.06 kg without fuse & bursting charge)

The same 278-gram BdZ 5127 fuse and 59-gram Amatol bursting charge was used for PzGr.39-1 and PzGr.39/43 rounds, requiring armoured targets of 30 mm or thicker to ignite after penetration for maximum effect.

== Versions ==
Pak 43 and Pak 43/41 specifications
Specification	Pak 43	Pak 43/41
Weight	Travel: 4,750 kg (10,470 lb); Combat: 3,650 kg (8,050 lb)	Combat: 4,350 kg (9,590 lb)
Length	9.2 m (30 ft 2 in)	9.144 m (30 ft 0 in)
Barrel length	6.35 m (20 ft 10 in)	6.36 m (20 ft 10 in)
Width		2.527 m (8 ft 3.5 in)
Height	1.7 m (5 ft 7 in)	1.981 m (6 ft 6.0 in)

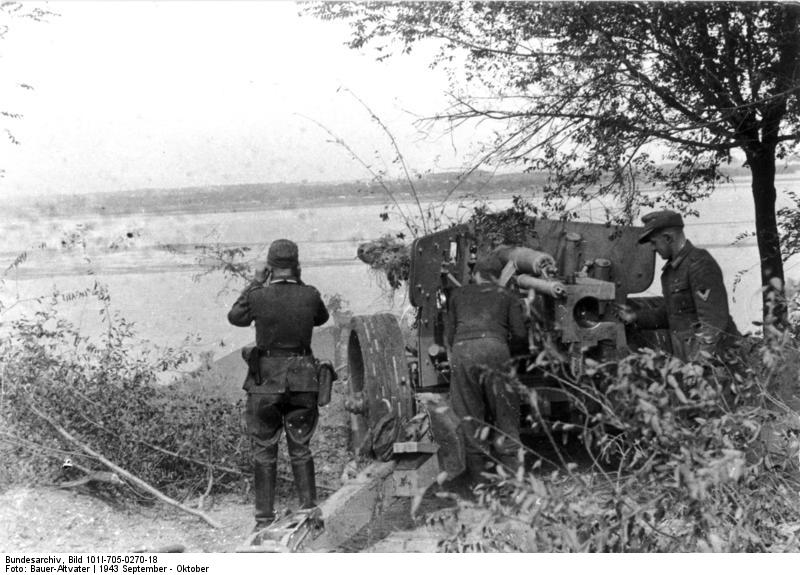
Pak 43/41 in firing position overlooking a river in Ukraine in September 1943

The main version of the Pak 43 was based on a highly effective cruciform mount, which offered a full 360 degree traverse and a much lower profile than the ubiquitous anti-aircraft 8.8 cm Flak 37. However the manufacture of this version was initially slow and costly, a situation that was made worse by the destruction of the carriage production line by Allied bombing.

As part of the design effort from Krupp to compete with the Flak 41, a barrel had been produced to prove the ballistics and design. This barrel design was developed, via an intermediate design known as the Gerät 42, to become the barrel used with Pak 43/41 design. When the Pak 43 was delayed, Krupp was asked to produce a weapon using this barrel using as many existing components as possible. This previous barrel design was then designated the Pak 41.

The Pak 41 barrel was fitted with a horizontal sliding-block breech mechanism resembling that of the 7.5 cm Pak 40, and the semi-automatic gear was a simplified version of that used on the Pak 43. The two-wheel split-trail carriage was from the 10.5 cm leFH 18 field howitzer, with the wheels from the 15 cm s FH howitzer. The Pak 41 was ballistically identical to the Pak 43 and fired the same ammunition, hence its performance was identical. Sources are unclear as to whether the Pak 41 and the Pak 43 barrels were identical; either way it is responsible for the Pak 43/41 designation for the whole design.

The 43/41 proved heavy and awkward to handle in the mud and snow of the Eastern Front and gunners referred to 43/41 as the "barn door" (German: Scheunentor), a reference to the size and weight of the gun. Nevertheless, the improvised Pak 43/41 proved an effective substitute for the Pak 43 until sufficient numbers of the more complex cruciform mounts could be manufactured to replace it in service.

The Pak 43 was also mounted in German armored vehicles, and this version was known as the 8.8 cm KwK 43. Versions of this gun were mounted in a number of German armored vehicles under different designations, including the Tiger II heavy tank (KwK 43 L/71) and several tank destroyers: the Hornisse/Nashorn (Pak 43/1), Ferdinand/Elefant (Pak 43/2, early name Stu.K. 43/1), and Jagdpanther (Pak 43/3 and Pak 43/4, early name Stu.K. 43). A few examples of the Tiger II-based Jagdtiger were also completed with the 8.8 cm weapon due to a shortage of the 12.8 cm Pak 44, but these tank destroyers are not believed to have seen operational service.

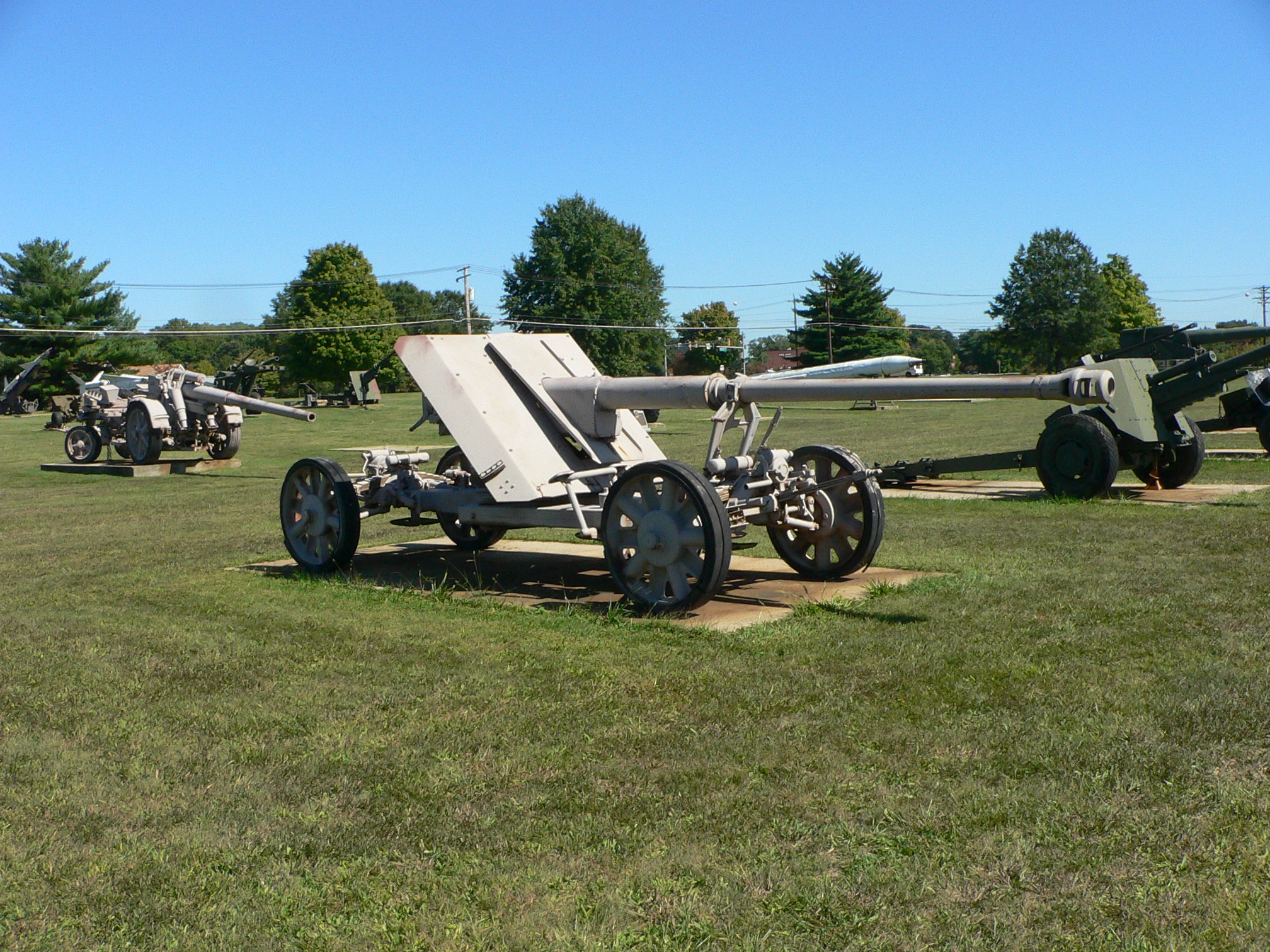
Pak 43 on cruciform mount, in towing configuration

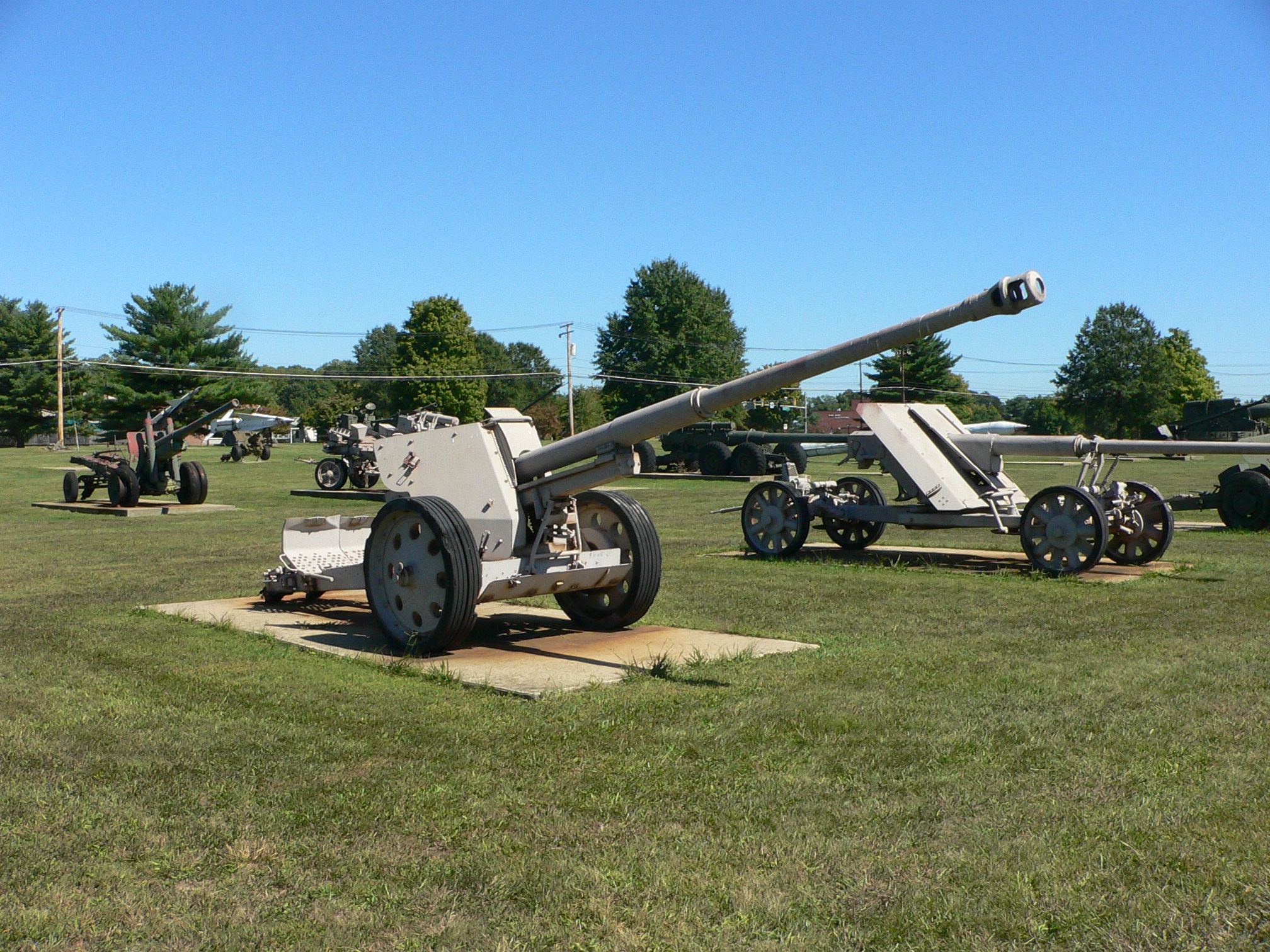
8.8 cm Pak 43/41 at US Army Ordnance Museum

== Service ==
There were 578 8.8 cm Pak in German army service on 1 October 1944 and 829 on 1 January 1945.

The Royal Hungarian Army also had a minimum of 31 pieces. The Hungarian First Army used them in the Northeastern Carpathians and later withdraw them to the "Attila" Line for the defence of Budapest.

== Ammunition and penetration ==
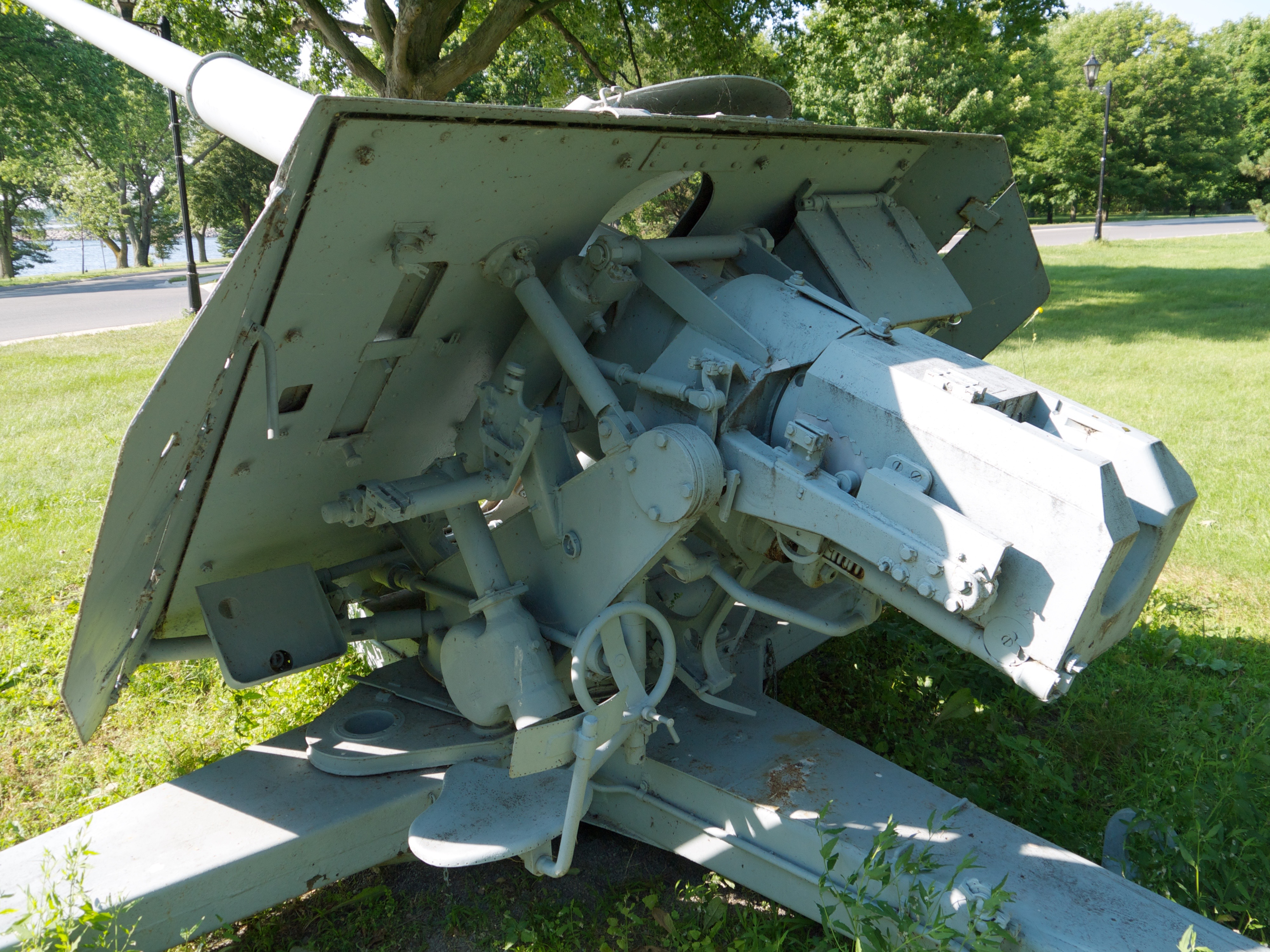
Pak 43 from the rear

The Pzgr. 39/43 and HE shells were generally available. Pzgr. 40/43 were in severely short supply.

=== Pzgr. 39/43 APCBC-HE ===
- Type: Armour-piercing Capped with Ballistic Cap - High Explosive
- Projectile weight: 10.4 kg (22.92 lbs)
- Muzzle velocity: 1,000 m/s (3,300 ft/s)

Performance
	Penetration	Hit probability versus 2.5 m x 2 m target	
Range	RHA plate at 30° from vertical	in training	in combat
100 m	202 mm	100%	100%
500 m	185 mm	100%	100%
1,000 m	165 mm	100%	85%
1,500 m	148 mm	95%	61%
2,000 m	132 mm	85%	43%
2,500 m	n/a	74%	30%
3,000 m	n/a	61%	23%
3,500 m	n/a	51%	17%
4,000 m	n/a	42%	13%

=== Pzgr. 40/43 APCR ===
- Type: Armour-Piercing Composite Rigid
- Projectile weight: 7.3 kg (16 lbs)
- Muzzle velocity: 1,130 m/s (3,707 ft/s)

Penetration figures established as average against a rolled homogeneous armour plate laid back 30 degrees from the vertical
	Hit probability versus 2.5 m x 2 m target		
Range	Penetration	in training	in combat
100 m	238 mm	100%	100%
500 m	217 mm	100%	100%
1000 m	193 mm	100%	89%
1500 m	171 mm	97%	66%
2000 m	153 mm	89%	47%
2500 m	n/a	78%	34%
3000 m	n/a	66%	25%

=== Gr. 39/3 HL (HEAT) ===
- Type: High explosive anti-tank
- Projectile weight: 7.65 kg (17 lbs)
- Muzzle velocity: 600 m/s (1,968 ft/s)
- Penetration: 110 mm

== See also ==
- 8.8 cm Flak 18/36/37/41
- 90 mm gun T15
- 105 mm gun T8
- Ordnance QF 32-pounder
- 100 mm field gun M1944 (BS-3)
