= Zimmerit =

Anti magnetic mine coating for German tanks, WW2

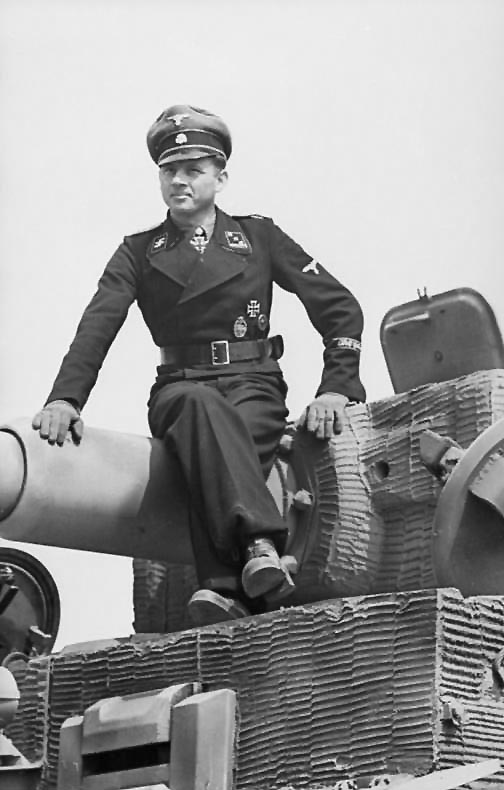
Close view of Zimmerit on the turret and hull of Michael Wittmann's Tiger I.

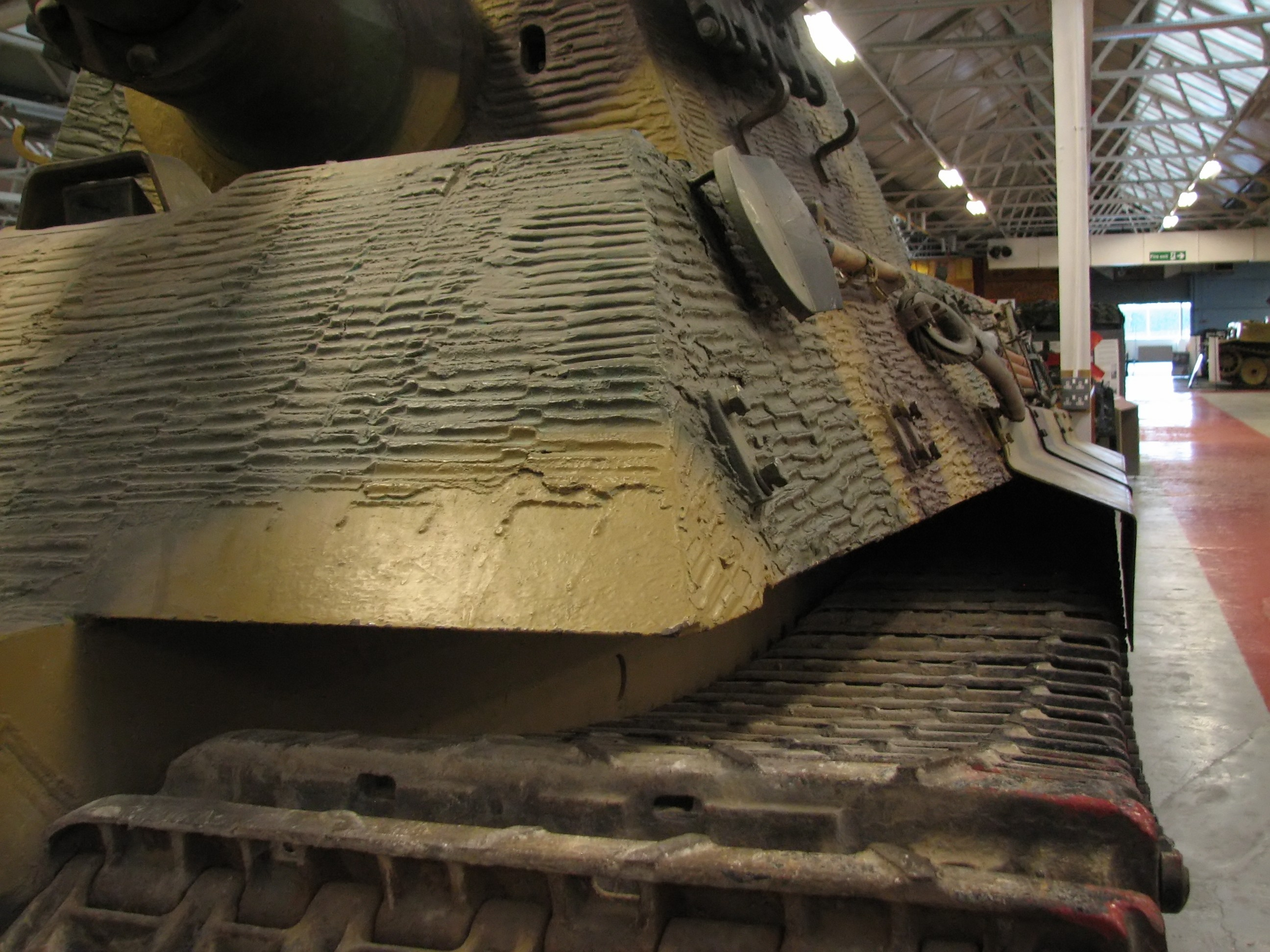
Close view of Zimmerit on the corner of a Tiger II

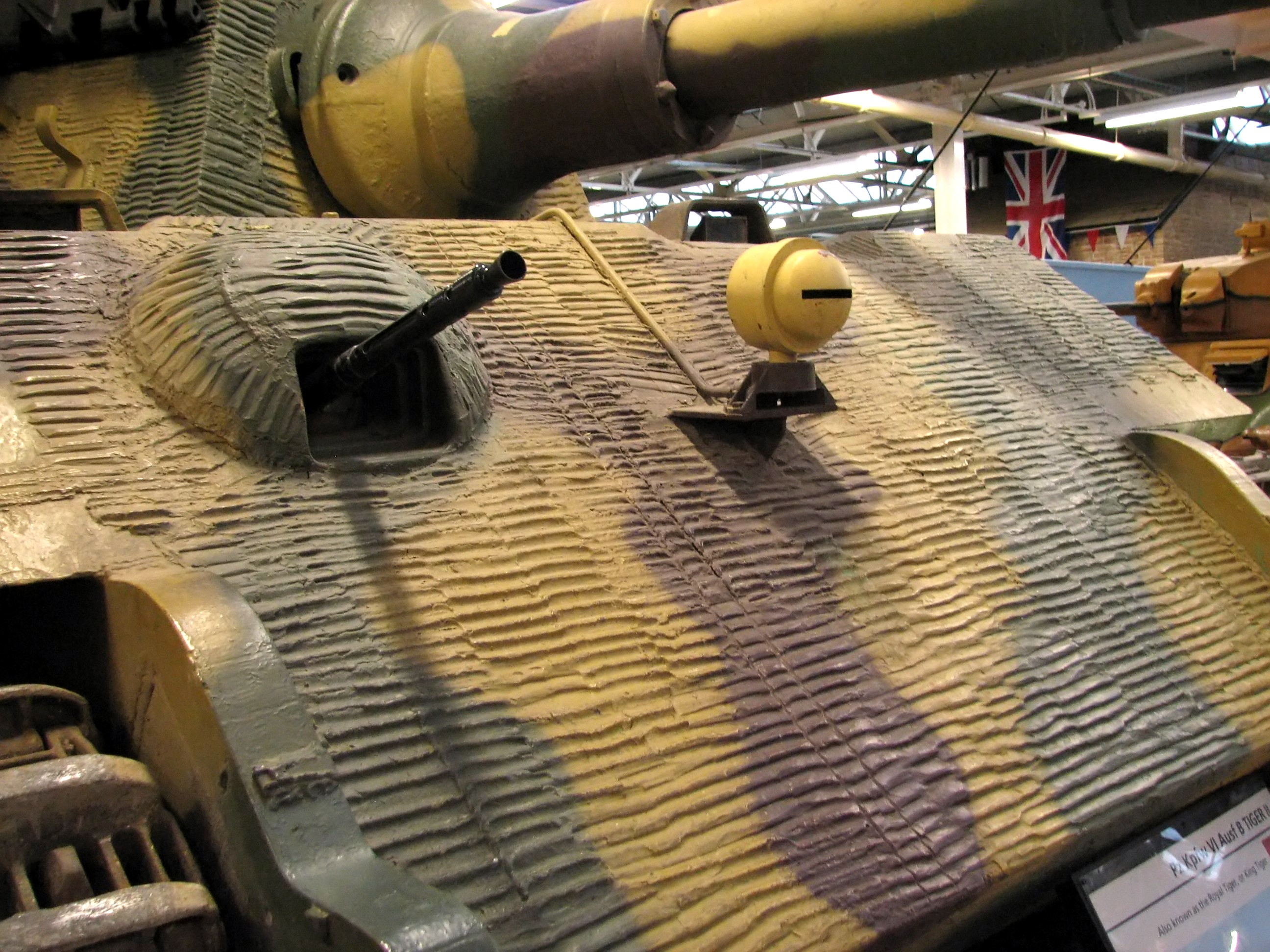
Close view of Zimmerit on the glacis of a Tiger II

Zimmerit was a paste-like coating used on mid- and late-war German armored fighting vehicles during World War II. It was used to produce a hard layer covering the metal armor of the vehicle, providing enough separation that magnetically attached anti-tank mines would fail to stick to the vehicle, despite Germany being the only country to use magnetic anti-tank mines in numbers. Zimmerit was often left off late-war vehicles due to the unfounded concern that it could catch fire when hit. It was developed by the German company Chemische Werke Zimmer & Co (Berlin).

== Operation ==
The coating was a barrier that prevented direct contact of magnetic mines with metal surfaces of vehicles. The magnetostatic field decreases very rapidly, with the cube of distance; the non-magnetic coating holds the magnet of the mine too far from the steel of the vehicle for it to adhere. The coating was normally ridged to increase the distance between the magnet and the armor even further, as the high points on the pattern increase the effective thickness of the coating while minimising additional weight.

The mixture had the consistency of a thick paste or putty. It was applied to the vehicle, usually at the factory, patterned, and then hardened with blow torches. There were many variations seen in application designs, from the regular ridge-shaped pattern, to a less common waffle-shaped pattern. The differences mostly related to the factory producing each type of AFV. For example, the waffle pattern was seen almost exclusively on Sturmgeschütz III assault guns. In general, vehicles already in service were not coated with Zimmerit.

== Deployment ==
The German army introduced the Hafthohlladung anti-tank weapon in 1942. This consisted of a shaped charge warhead connected to a metal ring holding three powerful horseshoe magnets. Issued to infantry, the user would run up to the tank and place the device on any surface to which the magnets would stick. The user would then pull the safety pin and run for safety. The magnets not only held the mine to the vehicle but also provided the correct spacing between warhead and armor, allowing the penetrator jet to form properly. Concerned that the simple design could be easily copied in the USSR, or the possibility that many of these weapons could fall into the hands of their enemies, the German army began looking for ways to defeat such a weapon when used against their own vehicles.

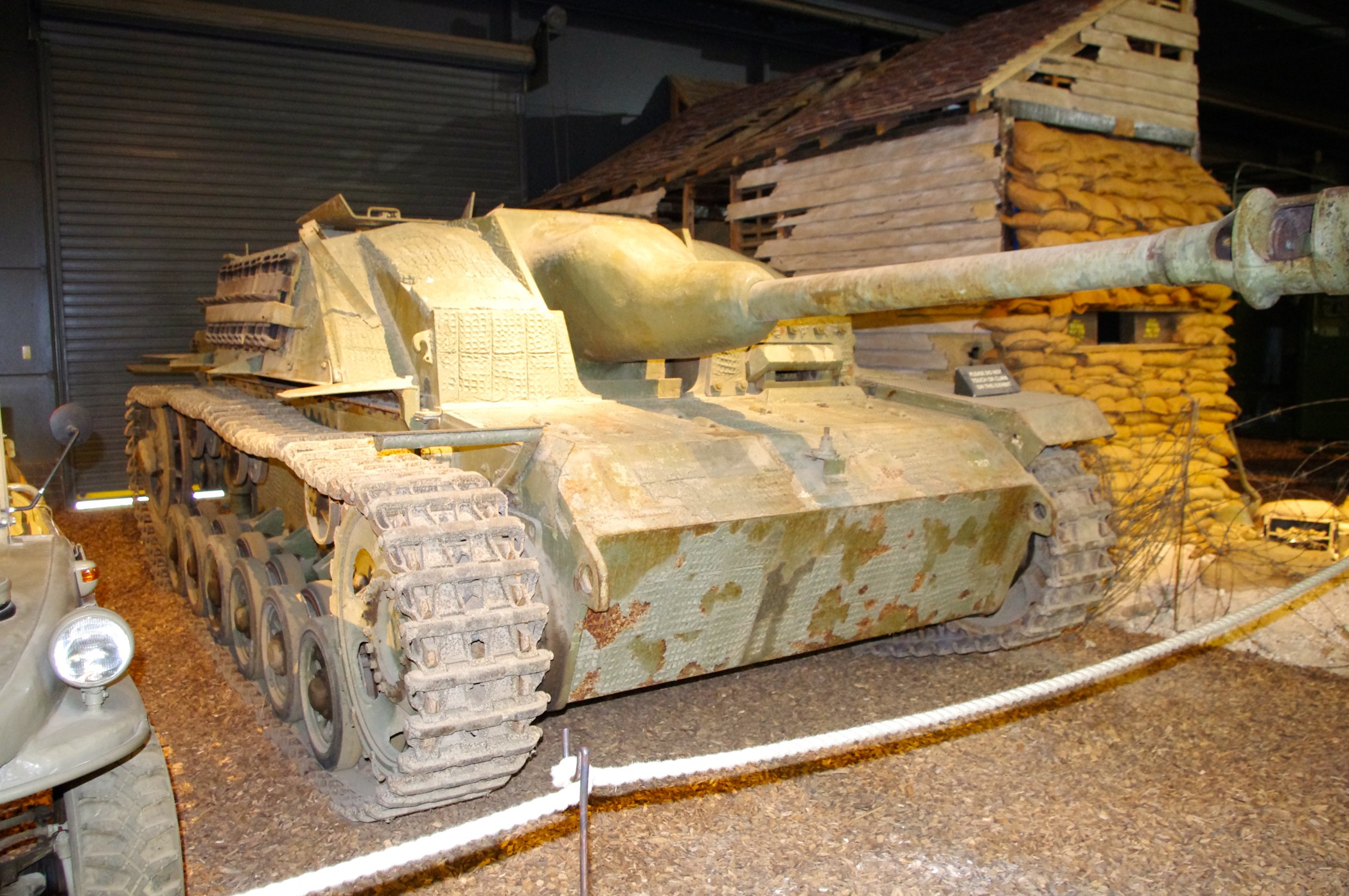
Stug III with waffle-pattern zimmerit, IWM Duxford museum collection.

Zimmerit was applied to some tanks and casemate-style closed-top self-propelled guns and tank destroyers produced from December 1943 to 9 September 1944. It was only rarely applied to open-topped AFVs. The rough appearance of the coating gave a distinct appearance; for one type, e.g. a shingle-like look.

Zimmerit was discontinued from factory application on 9 September 1944 and from field application on 7 October 1944. This was due to concerns that projectile impacts could ignite it. These proved false, but the order was never rescinded. Applying and drying the paste added days to the production of each vehicle, which was unacceptable as there was a shortage of tanks.

Following the war, the British carried out trials of a similar material on Churchill and Cromwell tanks and some trials were conducted in Canada with a similar material applied to self-propelled guns but it was not implemented. No similar material was used on post-war tanks as the widespread use of man-portable HEAT rockets such as the bazooka made magnetic mines obsolete.

== Ingredients ==
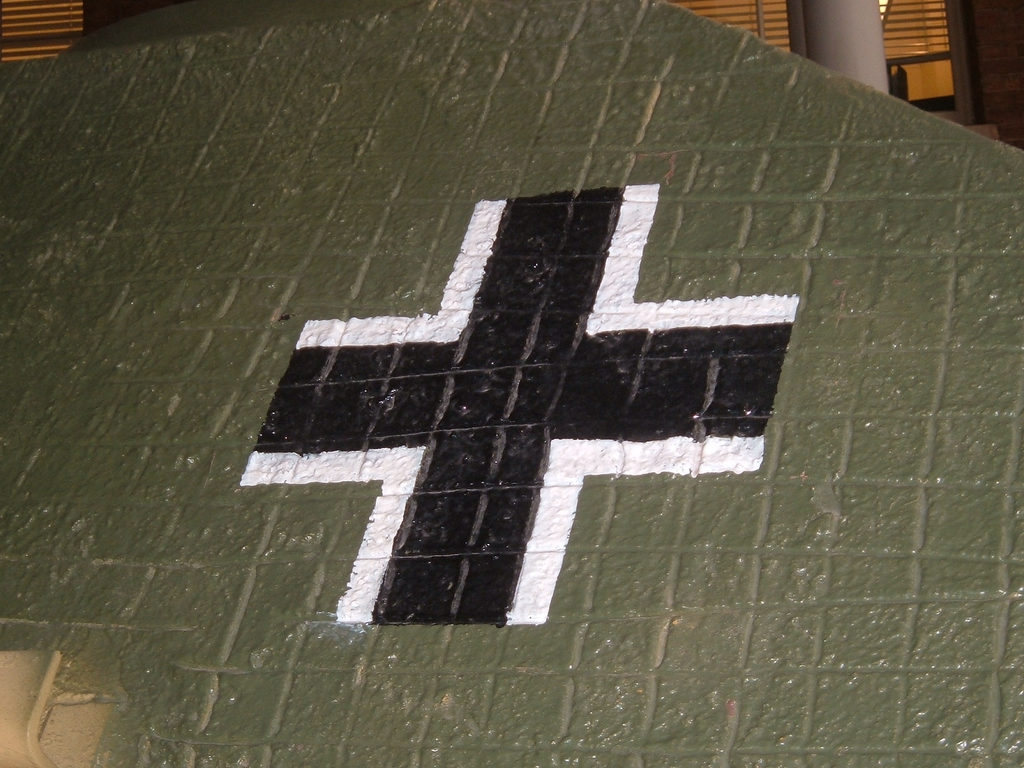
Squares pattern

The paste was composed of the following:

- 40% barium sulfate – BaSO_{4}
- 25% polyvinyl acetate – PVA (similar to white school glue)
- 15% pigment (ochre)
- 10% zinc sulfide – ZnS
- 10% sawdust

In the raw paste, polyvinyl acetate was used in the form of "Mowilith 20", a 50% benzene solution. During the drying process, the benzene evaporated and the mixture hardened.

== Vehicles with factory application ==
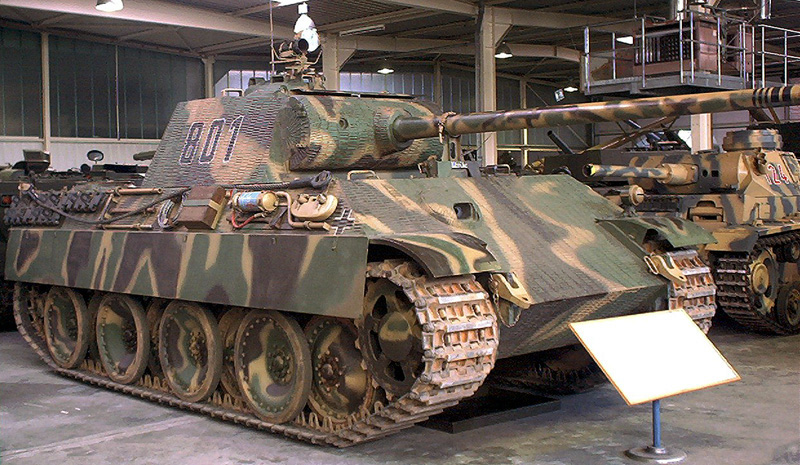
Panther Ausf. G with Zimmerit

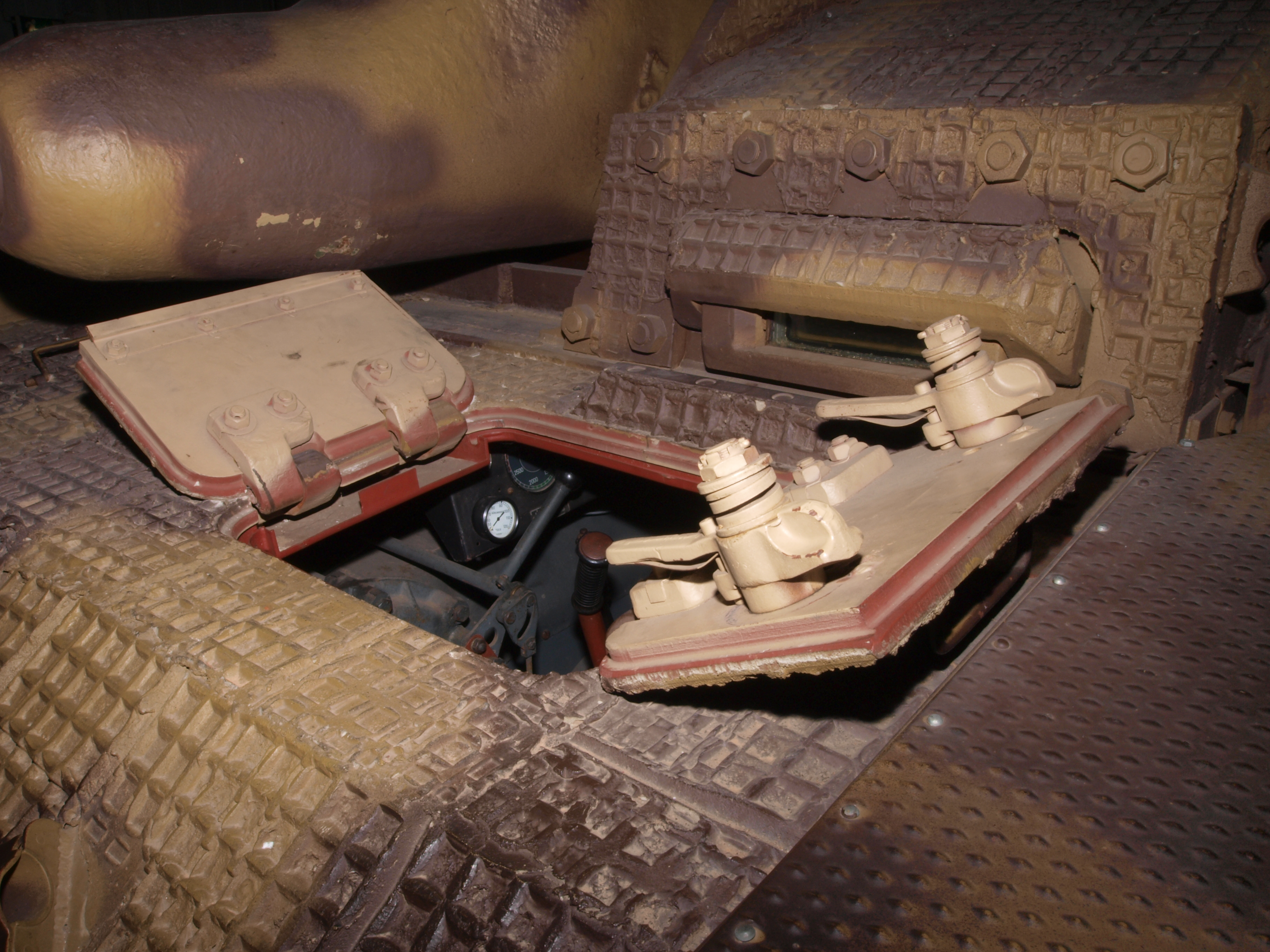
StuG III with waffle pattern

- Panzer III
- Panzer IV
- Panther
- Tiger I - mid and late production models only
- Tiger II - early models only
- Elefant - 48 Ferdinands rebuilt at Nibelungenwerk
- StuG III
- StuG IV - early models only
- Jagdtiger - Porsche versions only
- Jagdpanther - early models only
- Jagdpanzer IV
- Brummbär
- Sd.Kfz. 251 - very rare
