= Ferdinand Havis =

American state legislator and businessman (1846–1918)

Ferdinand Havis (November 15, 1846 – August 25, 1918) was an American barber, state legislator, businessman, government official, and state militia member in Arkansas.

Havis was born into slavery, the son of his enslaver and enslaved mother. He was a Republican. He owned a barbershop, about 2,000 acres of land, and his home.

He served five terms in the Pine Bluff Board of Aldermen and was a county assessor. He is buried at Bellwood Cemetery in Pine Bluff, Arkansas.
