= Ferd. Thürmer =

German piano manufacturer

- Company type: Private
- Industry: Musical instruments
- Founded: 1834; 192 years ago
- Founder: Ferdinand Thürmer
- Headquarters: Bochum, Germany
- Products: Pianos
- Website: ferdthuermer.de

Ferd. Thürmer Pianofortefabrik is a piano manufacturer in Bochum, Germany.

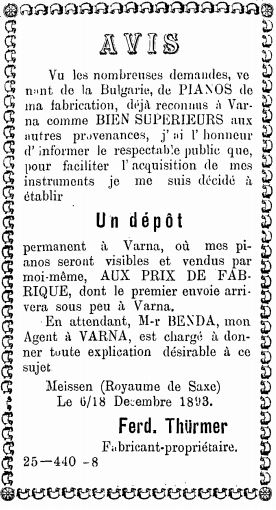
Commercial notice about establishing a Ferd. Thürmer Piano store in Varna, Principality of Bulgaria, 1893

The Thürmer family have been making pianos for 150 years now and have their factory in Bochum, Germany. It was founded in 1834 by Ferdinand Thürmer. Run by Jan Thürmer, the company has had success after being rebuilt after World War II, when the factory was expropriated by the Soviet occupation power.

== Current Grand Piano Models ==
Model	Length
170	170 cm
190	190 cm
211	211 cm
240	240 cm
280	280 cm

== Current Upright Piano Models ==
Model	Height
118 M	118 cm
123 M	123 cm
135 M	135 cm
