= The Continuing Story of Carel and Ferd =

The Continuing Story of Carel and Ferd is a video directed by Arthur Ginsberg and Video Free America involving footage filmed between 1970 and 1975 following the lives and marriage of Carel Rowe and Ferd Eggan. Originally shown as a 3- channel video, 8-monitor installation including live feed of the audience for The Kitchen in New York in 1971, the edited video is now distributed by Video Data Bank and Electronic Arts Intermix. The edited video consists of an hour-long tape selected from over 30 hours of footage that includes both footage of the marriage and subsequent consummation, shot from 1971-1972, and footage of an interview of Carel, Ferd, and Ginsberg produced for WNET's Video and Television Review in 1975. The video is most readily available as a 33:15 segment on a collection of videos and video segments produced by Video Data Bank, Surveying the First Decade: Volume One: Program 3: Approaching Narrative: "There are Problems to be Solved".The Continuing Story of Carel and Ferd is often classified as video vérité, somewhere in between cinéma vérité and reality television, though the footage predates An American Family, a documentary series often considered the first example of reality television.

The Continuing Story of Carel and Ferd blends modes of camera address, featuring shots taken by Ginsberg of the couple in private or among friends, as well as first-person camera confessional shots. Ginsberg, through the recently founded Video Free America, received some of the first Sony Portapaks in America in order to shoot the footage. Seeking to film the making of a pornographic film, Ginsberg found Carel and Ferd, who were looking to make an erotic film from their wedding, in order to repay a man whose car Ferd had recently crashed. Ginsberg began shooting the day that Richard, an old friend of Carel's, came by to talk about the wedding. This initial session was spontaneous, and in this instance Ginsberg says that in using video media, he was able to capture this footage impulsively, the video came about by chance. Though the footage is centered on the event of the wedding, the camera's insertion into the lives of Carel and Ferd before the event means that much of the footage anticipates the wedding self-consciously. Though the footage is cut to highlight specific moments and events, most of the footage is edited straightforwardly so as to not interrupt the narrative flow, the limited editing testament to Ginsberg's belief that with videotape any editing at all is "sapping its strength as a real-time medium."

== Synopsis ==
The Continuing Story of Carol and Ferd takes on a loose long-form narrative, with two main subjects in a circle of friends, primarily shot in San Francisco. Carel Rowe, a filmmaker and erotic film actress, and Ferd Eggan, a queer junkie, seek to be married, in part for the "media show" of their marriage and in part, a genuine desire to express their love for one another through the legal union of marriage. The footage features several others in their social group, notably Richard, a previous paramour of Carel's, who appears in an attempt to convince them to not get married, as well as in the actual marriage scene. The video also features several unnamed friends, often present and sometimes addressed during the filming. Both Carel and Ferd also mention many others in their circle, including Ferd's alleged lovers, a source of contention between the two. On camera, the two kiss, interrogate one another, banter, argue, and have sex.

The camera documents their intimacy as well as interrupts it, as they address the camera directly and answer questions asked by Ginsberg, behind the camera. After a fight scene, Ginsberg asked an unnamed friend in the shot whether the couple was fighting because the camera was on, to which the friend repliedm "Oh I don’t think they’re doing it because the camera is on, but the camera's affecting them." In the WNET broadcast, the two refer to the camera as a catalyst for action, and that their behavior in the presence of the camera was performance of only certain realities. The wedding itself was shot with more jump cuts, interviewing guests and featuring multiple close-up shots of details of the ceremony. The ceremony was a combination of a Jewish service and a media show, referencing Marshall Mcluhan's phrase "The medium is the message". The wedding footage concludes with loud and obviously staged shots of the consummation of the marriage. In this footage, the cameramen are present and visible, the camera's whirring is recorded, and the camera men shout directions at the couple.

== Broadcast ==
The WNET program ran the video with the earlier black-and-white shots interspersed with later footage of Jon Carroll, Ginsberg, Rowe, and Eggan in a video studio, edited to seem as though they were watching and commenting on the earlier footage. The first instance of later footage is overlaid with scrolling text that introduces the program as it is being broadcast. The scrolling text introduction reads:

Video and Television Review brings you "The Continuing Story of Carel and Ferd", a documentary soap opera set in October 1970, when Carel Rowe and Ferd Eggan were about to "tie the knot" they invited a third partner to join the marriage, a portable video camera. Which for a while became the most demanding partner of all. For the next hour we join Carel and Ferd along with the tapemaker Arthur Ginsberg and Jon Carroll, the west coast editor of the Village Voice as they watch their story on tape again. It is a story about marriage, about sexual identity and about living too close to an electronic medium.

Though the footage was taken and presented before its appearance on public television, the WNET program ran after the original run of the documentary series An American Family on PBS, linking the two as examples of precursors to reality television, early attempts at introducing the camera into daily life.
