= Ferd J. Hess =

American Democratic politician

- Born: Ferdinand James Hess; February 4, 1848; Trenton, Tennessee, United States
- Died: December 27, 1928 (aged 80)
- Occupations: politician, farmer
- Known for: served in the Missouri General Assembly in the Missouri House of Representatives
- Notable work: President, Missouri State Board of Agriculture

Ferdinand James "Ferd" Hess (February 4, 1848 – December 27, 1928) was an American Democratic politician and farmer who served in the Missouri General Assembly in the Missouri House of Representatives. Born in Trenton, Tennessee, he moved to Missouri in 1875. He was also president of the Missouri State Board of Agriculture.
