= 501st Heavy Panzer Battalion =

- schwere Panzerabteilung 501 — s PzAbt 501—
- Active: 1942–1945
- Country: Nazi Germany
- Branch: Heer
- Type: Panzer
- Role: Armoured warfare
- Size: Battalion, up to 45 tanks
- Part of: independent unit attached as necessary
- Equipment: Panzer III (1942-1943); Tiger I (1942–1944); Tiger II (1944–1945)
- Engagements: World War II: Tunisian campaign; Eastern Front

Insignia
- Stalking tiger

The 501st Heavy Panzer Battalion (German: "schwere Panzerabteilung 501"; abbreviated: "s PzAbt 501") was a German heavy Panzer Abteilung (an independent battalion-sized unit) equipped with heavy tanks. The battalion was the second unit to receive and use the Tiger I heavy tank, changing to Tiger IIs in mid-1944.

From November 1942 it fought, and in May 1943 surrendered, in Tunisia; reformed in September 1943, it fought on the Eastern front until destroyed in early July 1944; it reformed with Tiger IIs in mid-July 1944, then mostly deactivated on 11 February 1945.

== Formation ==
The first heavy armor units in the German Army were the 501st and 502nd heavy tank companies, founded 16 February 1942. They were combined into the 501st heavy tank battalion on 10 May 1942 in Erfurt, commanded by Major Hans-Georg Lueder. In late August, the first Tigers began to arrive, delivery priority having been given to the formation of the 502nd Heavy Panzer Battalion. The 501st was promised to the Afrika Korps for use in North Africa, and was prepared for tropical operations. Initially, the battalion consisted of 20 Tiger I and 25 Panzer III.

German heavy tank battalions were initially planned to be composed of two companies, each with four platoons of two Tigers and two Panzer IIIs. Each company commander would have an additional Tiger, and battalion command would have another two, for a total of 20 Tigers and 16 Panzer III.

== Operations ==
=== North Africa ===
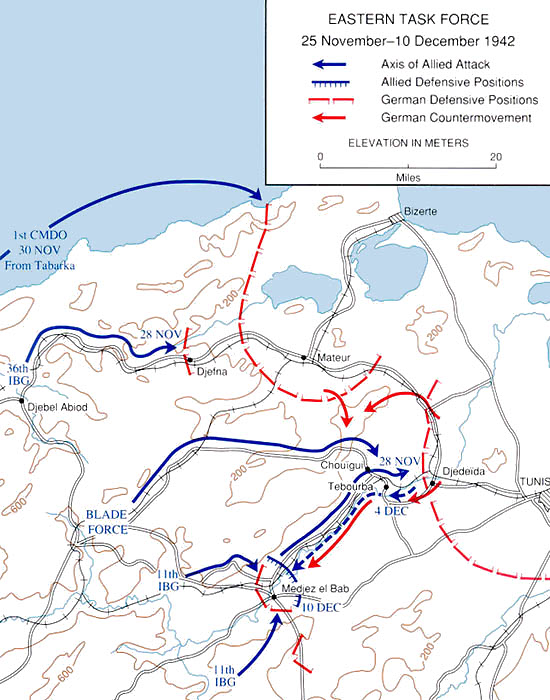
Operations in Tunisia, 25 November – 10 December 1942

Following the Allied landing in French North Africa the battalion, with its 16 Panzer IIIs, arrived in Tunisia between November 1942 and January 1943.

Initially only three Tiger Is of the 501st landed at Tunis on 23 November 1942. These first elements of the battalion, along with four Panzer IIIs, were organized with other units into Kampfgruppe Lueder. They were involved in fighting just over a week later during the Axis counterattack on 1 December, destroying nine US and two British tanks on the first day while relieving German forces. On 2 December, KG Lueder, with one Tiger and five Panzer IIIs, attacked Tebourba, stopping an Allied advance and knocking out six tanks and four anti-tank guns for the loss of three Panzer IIIs. On 3 December, the single operational Tiger I was reinforced by three newly arrived Tigers, which, with infantry support, surrounded Tebourba. The next day, with Junkers Ju 87 Stuka aircraft support, Kampfgruppe Lueder took Tebourba but was then disbanded, all of its Tigers being out of action. Of 182 tanks present, the Allies lost 134.

Reinforcements of one Tiger and one Panzer III arrived on 9 December, which along with repairs of battle damage, gave an inventory of seven Tiger Is and five Panzer IIIs. The next day, they moved together with elements of 10th Panzer Division on the road to Massicault, attacking towards Majaz al Bab, gaining 13 km (8.1 mi) and destroying 14 M3 Stuart tanks. The next day, they covered the southern flank of the main attack and acted as a reserve element, 7 km (4.3 mi) east of Djedeida.

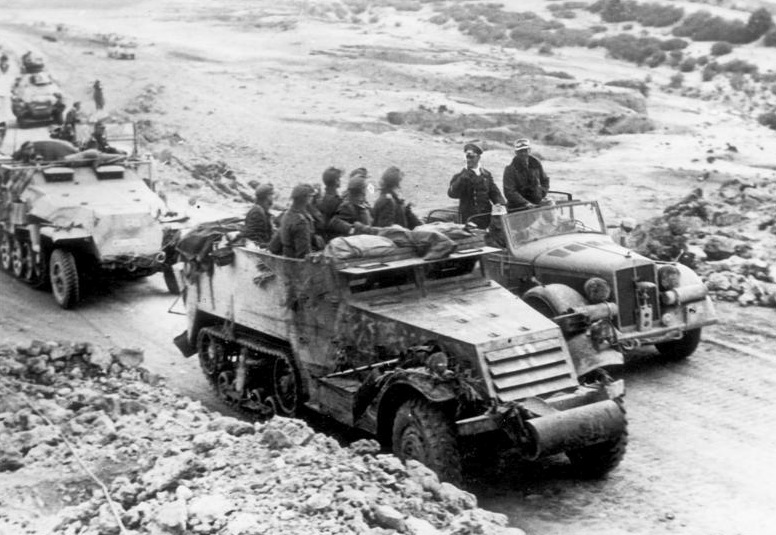
Erwin Rommel talks to German soldiers using a captured US M3 half-track

By the end of December 1942, strength was up to 11 out of 12 Tigers operational, plus 16 Panzer IIIs. On 15 January 1943, eight Tigers and eight Panzer IIIs were assigned to work with 756th Mountain Infantry Regiment, KG Lueder was re-established with five Tigers and 10 Panzer IIIs plus the 1st battalion of the 69th Mechanised Infantry Regiment. On 18 January, as part of Operation Eilbote I, the mountain infantry broke through enemy positions which were protected by anti-tank mines, and captured a crossing south west of Lake Kebir; one Tiger was scrapped due to a shortage of spare road wheels after hitting a mine. On 19 January, KG Lueder attacked along the road towards Robaa, then turned and took the crossing at Hir Moussa, capturing US personnel carriers which were turned over to their infantry. Skirmishes on 20 January resulted in the loss of a Tiger to a British 6 pdr anti-tank gun, and another blown up by German engineers. Over the next two days, British counterattacks were repelled; three enemy tanks destroyed for the loss of two Panzer III and one Tiger (one was salvaged).

14 Panzer IIIs plus 11 out of 16 available Tigers were operational on 31 January 1943. They were split between the 756th and 69th again; under KG Weber they began Operation Eilbote II, but it was stopped by strong anti-tank defenses and minefields, then withdrew. Tiger armor was penetrated for the first time, two were knocked out; one burnt and was unrecoverable.

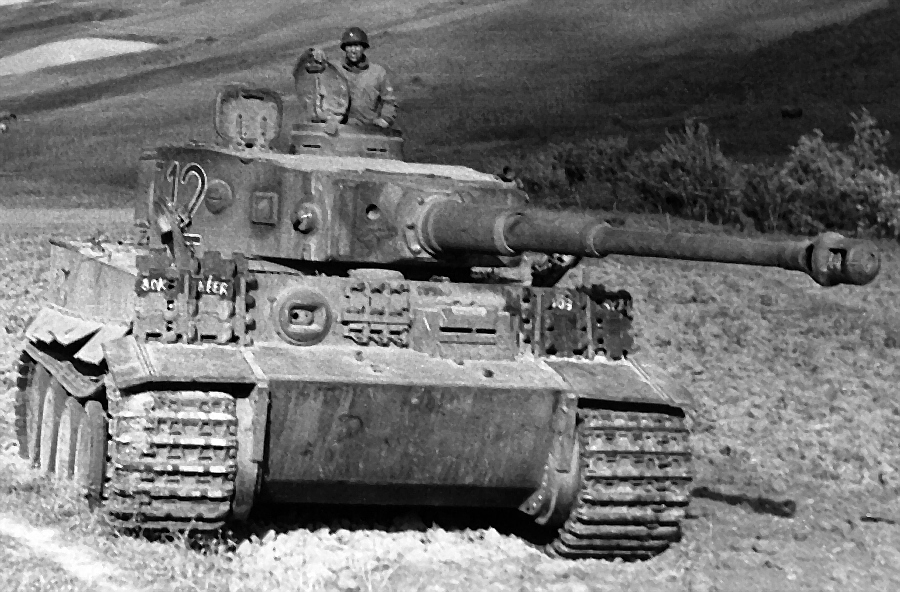
Tiger I of the 501st captured in Tunisia, 1943

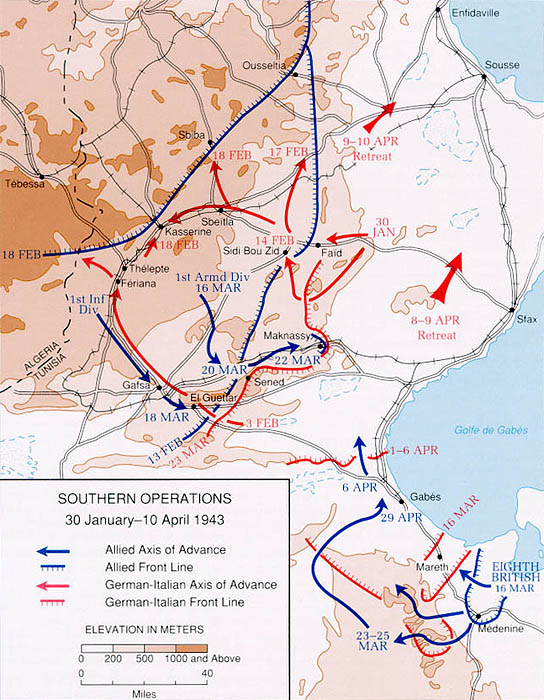
Operations in Tunisia, 30 January – 1- April 1943

The six Tigers and nine Panzer IIIs of the 1st Company of the 501st were attached to 10 Panzer Division on 8 February for Operation Frühlingswind. After night marches, they joined KG Reimann near Bou Thadi on 13 February. The next day, they broke through the Faïd Pass and joined the Battle of Sidi Bou Zid. Tigers knocked out 20 M4 Sherman tanks of the US 1st Armored Division. On 26 February, the 501st was re-designated III./Panzer-Regiment 7 of 10 Panzer-Division at the end of the Battle of the Kasserine Pass. Each company received 15 Panzer IVs as reinforcement.

The battalion that took part in the Axis offensive of Operation Ochsenkopf on 27 February. However it was stalled by numerous artillery bombardments, air attacks and mud. One Tiger also hit a mine. Continuing the attack overnight, seven more Tigers were immobilized by mines and Major Lueder was wounded. The next day, 1 March, all of the immobilized tanks were blown up, leaving one operational Tiger. The offensive failed with huge tank losses so much so that 501st had ceased to be an effective fighting force.

Over the next few days, more tanks were made operational, reaching six Tigers, 12 Panzer IIIs and seven Panzer IVs by 10 March. On 17 March, the remnants (11 Tigers) of the 501st were attached to the 504th, which had just arrived. On 12 May 1943, the 501st were among over 230,000 Axis soldiers who surrendered at the end of the Tunisia Campaign following the Allied capture of Tunis. According to Robert Forczyk, 18 men from the company managed to escape to Sicily.

=== Eastern Front ===
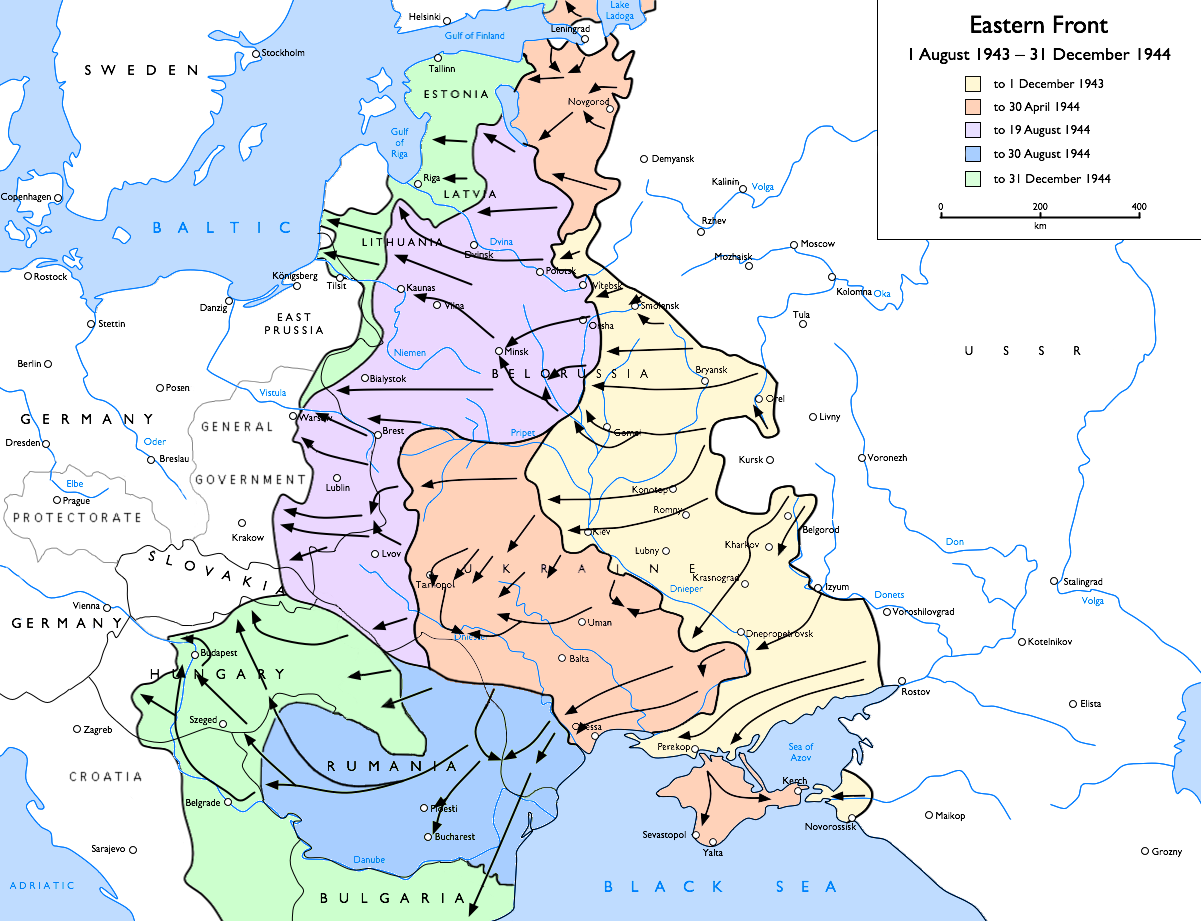
Soviet advances from 1 August 1943 to 31 December 1944: to 1 December 1943 to 30 April 1944 to 19 August 1944 to 31 December 1944

On 9 September 1943, the 501st was reformed from a few remnants of the old battalion, including several wounded tank crewmen who had been evacuated to Europe for recuperation before the end in Tunisia, commanded by Major Erich Löwe. By 12 November, it comprised 45 Tiger I tanks (three companies of 14 tanks, plus three tanks for battalion command). Between 5–12 December, the battalion was transferred to the Vitebsk region in the Soviet Union (modern Belarus).

On 20 December, the 501st attacked an enemy tank formation near Losovka, which inflicted 21 enemy tank, and 28 gun casualties, for the loss of two of its own tanks and all three company commanders wounded. Because infantry support was unable to follow, the 501st withdrew. Three days later, Major Löwe, the battalion commander, went missing after he was forced to change tanks when his own was knocked out. In the next five days, the battalion destroyed 81 enemy tanks. By the end of December, 16 Tigers were operational out of 39 available, two having fallen into Soviet hands.

Major von Legat took command in January 1944 and the battalion carried out missions in the Orsha region. On 13 January, a Tiger was destroyed by an artillery shell plunging through its turret roof. On 13 February, failed attacks led to the loss of nine Tigers. By 1 March, only 17 Tigers are available out of 29 due to a lack of spare parts.

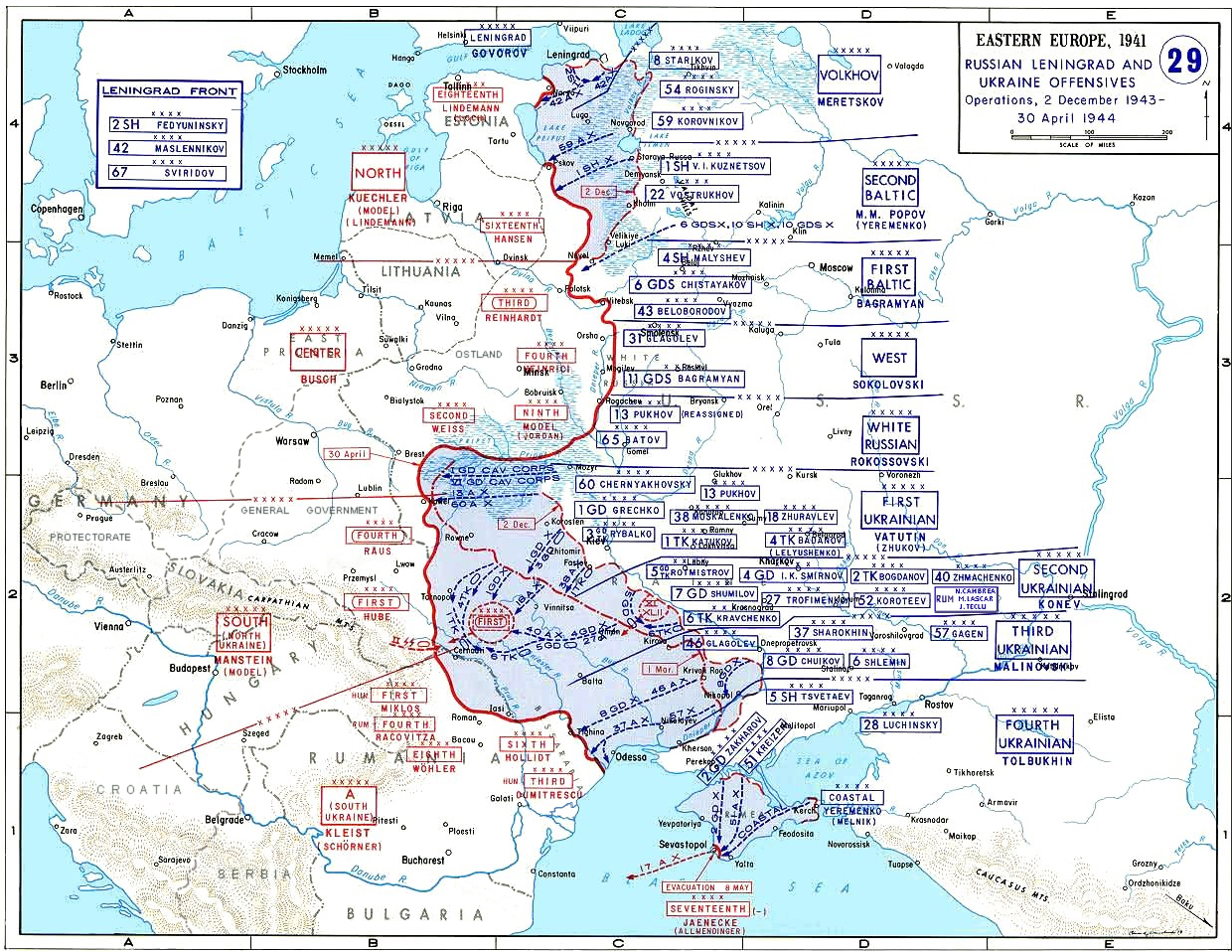
Eastern Front, April 1944. 501st is attached to 4th Panzer Army in May, and 3rd Army in June.

On 12 March, the battalion joined the 256th infantry division in a counterattack north of Nipinzy; by the next day, the enemy forces were surrounded and destroyed. By 1 April, spare parts had been delivered and 27 tanks were operational.

In June, nine tanks were transferred to the 509th, leaving 20 operational. On 23 June, fighting at Orsha, opposing the Soviet Operation Bagration, dispersed the battalion, leading to several days of independent tank battles, some against IS-2s. Under the weight of a withdrawing Tiger, the Orsha bridge collapsed, and several others ran out of fuel. The rest retreated towards the Berezina River, where only six could be ferried across, the rest being blown up on 1–2 July.

By 2–4 July, ad hoc defenses of dispersed Tigers fell back towards the Minsk area: despite five replacements which boosted operational forces to seven, two were lost, and another broke down. The next day two Tigers ran out of fuel while withdrawing near Maladzyechna, another bogged down, and all three immobilized Tigers were blown up. Operational tanks dropped to zero.

==== Tiger II ====
The battalion was reconstituted at Ohrdruf on 14 July. By 7 August 1944, the battalion attained full strength, with 45 new Tiger IIs equipped with later production turrets.

On 5 August, two companies entrained to south eastern Poland to join Army Group North Ukraine, to continue to resist Operation Bagration. After detraining, most suffered final drive breakdowns while on a 50 km (31 mi) road march. On 11 August, the battalion was attached to 16th Panzer Division. The eight operational tanks attacked the Soviet bridgehead over the Vistula River near Baranów Sandomierski. On the road to Oględów, three Tiger IIs were destroyed in an ambush by a T-34-85. Because these tanks suffered ammunition explosions which caused many crew fatalities, main gun rounds were no longer allowed to be stowed within the turret, reducing capacity to 68. Over the next two days, the battalion took heavy casualties.

On 12 August, the remaining company entrained at Ohdruf, to join the rest of the battalion.

After poor tactics in and around Radom on 22 August, the battalion commander was relieved, and also implicated in the 20 July plot to assassinate Hitler. He was replaced by Major Saemisch. On 1 September, 26 Tigers IIs were operational, and the battalion was assigned to XXXVIII Panzer Corps. Later in the month, the remaining company eventually joined the rest of the battalion.

The battalion was down to 36 out of 53 Tiger IIs operational by 1 October 1944. By 1 November this rose to 49, boosted by the absorption of several Tiger Is from the remnants of the 509th. On 21 December, the battalion was redesignated the 424th Heavy Tank Battalion and assigned to the XXIV Panzer Corps, part of 4th Panzer Army.

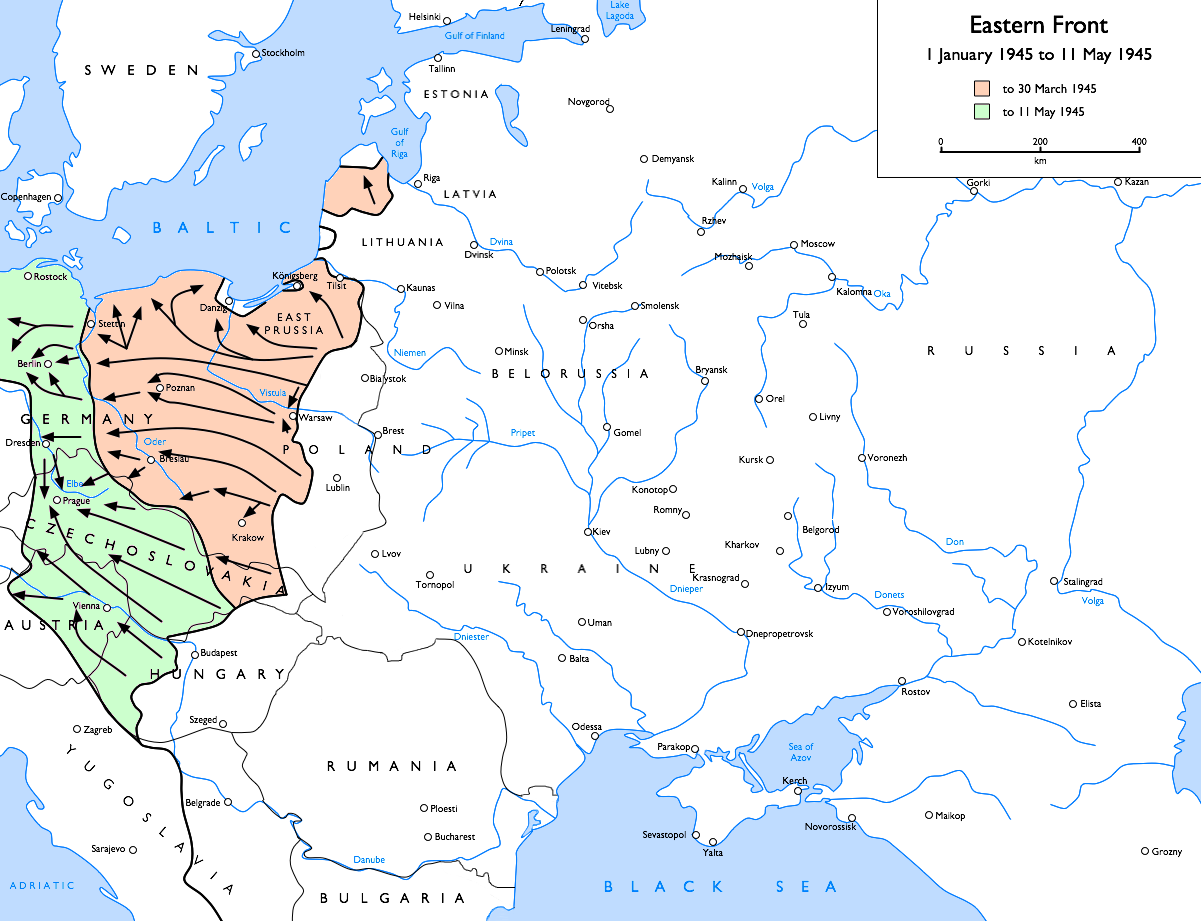
Soviet advances from 1 January 1945 to 7 May 1945: to 30 March 1945 to 7 May 1945

The Soviet Vistula–Oder Offensive started on 12 January 1945. The battalion had been deployed far forward, possibly by the direct intervention of Hitler, contrary to the wishes of all command levels from the battalion commander all to the General of Army Group A. The battalion initially received no orders. On 13 January, it was ordered towards Lisow. En route, one Tiger II fell through a bridge. All three companies attempted to attack, but many bogged down in poor ground and were not recoverable. Leutnant Oberbracht lost both tracks but destroyed 20 enemy tanks; 50 to 60 enemy tanks were destroyed in total. Several other tanks broke down while moving to contact. IS-2s and anti-tank guns in Lisow ambushed the battalion, which was almost destroyed; even the battalion commander's tank was knocked out. One Tiger II broke down while successfully recovering a bogged down comrade, and had to be destroyed. Poor reconnaissance was blamed for the debacle.

The next day, some remnants of the battalion fought on in the pocket forming around them, but were blown up after running out of fuel. Another Tiger II fell through a bridge and was abandoned. The remaining tanks regrouped at Grunberg, gathering together whatever tanks they could (two Panthers, three Panzer IVs, two Hornisse and some Hetzer tank destroyers). After delaying actions with makeshift forces, the remaining elements withdrew by train to Paderborn on 5 February.

On 11 February 1945, the remaining personnel of the first and second companies of the battalion were reorganized into the 512th heavy tank destroyer battalion (schwere Panzer-Jager-Abteilung 512). The third company remained in Paderborn, and together with two Tiger Is, one Panther and one Panzer IV from the 500th tank training battalion (Panzer-Ersatz-und Ausbildungs Abt. 500) fought a short unsuccessful battle against British forces on Easter 1945. The remaining elements surrendered at Höxter.

== Commanders ==
- Major Hans-Georg Lueder (10 May 1942 – 28 February 1943) (wounded)
- Major August Seidensticker (17 March 1943 – 12 May 1943) (as part of 504th heavy tank battalion)
- Major Erich Löwe (September 1943 – 23 December 1943) (missing)
- Major von Legat (January 1944 – 22 August 1944) (relieved)
- Major Saemisch (22 August 1944 – 13 January 1945) (killed)

== See also ==
- German heavy tank battalion
- Organisation of a SS Panzer Division
- Panzer Division
