= 510th =

510th may refer to:

- 510th Squadron (disambiguation), several units
- 510th Heavy Panzer Battalion, a German Panzer-Abteilung equipped with heavy tanks
- 510th Tactical Missile Wing, a United States Air Force unit

== See also ==
- 510 (number)
- 510, the year 510 (DX) of the Julian calendar
- 510 BC
