= 506th Heavy Panzer Battalion =

- schwere Panzerabteilung 506 — s.Pz.Abt 506— II
- Insignia for Stab./s.Pz.Abt.506
- Active: 8 May 1943 – 14 April 1945
- Country: Germany
- Branch: German Heer
- Type: Panzer
- Role: Armoured warfare
- Size: Battalion, 45 tanks
- Part of: Wehrmacht
- Equipment: Tiger I (1942–1945); Tiger II (1944–1945)
- Engagements: Eastern Front: Battle of the Dnieper; Battle of the Korsun–Cherkassy Pocket; Western Front: Operation Market Garden; Battle of the Nijmegen salient; Battle of Aachen; Operation Queen; Battle of the Bulge

The 506th Heavy Panzer Battalion (German: schwere Panzerabteilung 506; abbreviated: "s.Pz.Abt. 506") was a German heavy Panzer Abteilung (independent battalion-sized unit) equipped with Tiger I tanks until 28 July 1944. During the period from 20 August to 12 September 1944, it was re-equipped with a full complement of 45 Tiger Ausf. B tanks. Some of the first Tiger IIs delivered to the 506th were examples fitted with the early production turret. The battalion saw action on the Eastern and Western Fronts during World War II. As with other German heavy tank battalions, it was attached as needed to larger formations. The 506th was unique in being the only Tiger battalion to include a fourth company. German: schwere Panzerkompanie Hummel, equipped with Tiger I tanks, was consolidated with the 506th in 1944. It was also unique in that it regularly received new vehicles and replacements from other units to maintain a full complement. The unit served until the collapse of the Ruhr Pocket in April 1945, being officially disbanded by the battalion commander on 14 April. Despite what were often poor conditions of deployment, the unit was officially credited with over 400 tank kills during its service with fewer than 75 combat losses.

== Equipment ==
As with other Tiger battalions, the 506th's complement of tanks was supported by mechanized Reconnaissance infantry and Pioneers. The unit was also supported by a battery of four wirbelwind and four Möbelwagen self-propelled anti-aircraft guns. The 506th was the first of the Tiger battalions to be solely equipped with heavy tanks; it was never equipped with variants of the Panzer III for support. The Tiger I tanks of the 506th had a unique 2-digit enumeration system: The battalion staff platoon tanks were numbered '01,' '02,' and '03,' and each company's 14 tigers were simply numbered 1-14. The HQ and separate companies could be identified by the color of the numbers: black for the HQ, white for the 1st company, red for the 2nd, and yellow for the 3rd. This carried over to the unit insignia, where the color of the 'W' (commemorating Major Willing) matched that of the company's enumeration.

When the unit was re-equipped with Tiger IIs and later received a 4th company consisting of Tiger Is, the numbering system was changed slightly. While retaining the 1-14 numbering scheme, a prefix digit was added (1, 2, or 3) to signify the company. Digits for tanks of the 2nd company received a white outline, while the yellow digits of the third company were changed to black with yellow outline. The tanks of the 4th company also used the 3-digit system (starting with a prefix of '4') and the color for the company was green (with white outline for the digits).

== Combat History ==
=== Eastern Front ===
The unit was established in St. Pölten on 20 July 1943 and formed from the men of 9th Panzer Division's 2nd Battalion, Pz.Rgt.33. Equipped with 45 Tiger Is, the 506th first saw combat on 20 September, attached to the 9.Pz.Div. Ten tigers, in support of a kampfgruppe from the 10th Panzergrenadier Regiment committed to an assault on the heavily-defended town of Pavlovka. The unsuccessful attack saw the unit lose its first Tiger. Several offensive and defensive operations in the area took place over the next few weeks. Six tanks were lost near Schevchenkove on the 24th and 26th (three on each day). During this period, the commander of the 3rd company, Oberleutnant Hoffmann, was killed. The staff of the 16th Panzergrenadier Division would later submit a report on these engagements. From these, it was clear that the Tiger I, even as early as September 1943, was not impervious to Soviet weaponry- including hits to the frontal armor. All six tanks lost from the 24th through the 26th were destroyed by hits from beyond 1 km. The 506th saw extensive action in the Battle of the Dnieper and in October fought in the Krivoi Rog area, south of Kirovograd. The battalion commander, Major Gerhard Willing, was killed in action on 23 October. By the 30th, only 6 tanks were operational, but 14 back in running order on 10 November. On the 14th, three Tigers of 3./s.Pz.Abt.506, led by Leutnant Graef, found a group of refueling soviet tanks near Nedei Woda- the Tigers destroyed 19 tanks in the following action. On 25 November, the unit knocked out three T-34 tanks but suffered a loss to a rare example of fratricide when Unteroffizier Hendricks's Tiger was knocked out by a German AT gun. This was the first of two instances in which the 506th lost a Tiger to German weaponry. On 25 December 1943, Leutnant Bapistella's Tiger was knocked out by a German 8,8 cm gun captured and deployed by the Soviets.

On 28 November 1943, Hauptmann Eberhard Lange was assigned as battalion commander. With only a handful of tanks operational at a time, the battalion engaged in a number of deployments near Rassnyj during the first two weeks of December. The 506th's unusual numbering scheme for its tanks, not specifying the platoon with a digit, was because of the frequent ad-hoc deployment of Tigers. The unit commander argued that Kampfgruppen were usually formed from whatever tanks were available rather than by official platoon assignment. On 16 December, the unit's 9 operational Tigers were deployed near Kirovograd in support of the 13th Panzer Division. By 20 December, none of the battalion's 27 remaining tanks were operational, but four were in running order the next day. On the 29th and 30th, thirteen Tigers- half of the 506th's remaining tanks- were transported by rail to Oratow to support III.Panzer-Korps where fighting would continue throughout the next month. The unit suffered heavy losses during operations alongside the 16th Panzer Division and had lost 16 of its 26 total tanks by 27 January, but 6 new tanks were delivered on both the 29th and 30th.

=== Korsun-Cherkassy ===
On 1 February, the battalion undertook a 100 km road march west of the Korsun–Cherkassy Pocket in preparation for a relief attempt. With 10 Tigers in running order, the 506th took Kutschkowa alongside the 16th Panzer Division on 4 February to begin Operation: Wanda. During the next few days, despite fuel shortages and the subsequent stalling of the advance, the 506th knocked out 49 enemy tanks with no losses of its own. It was strengthened with 5 Tigers and relocated to Winograd with 27 total tanks on 9 February before being attached to schwere Panzer Regiment Bäke on the 11th. Over the following week, the unit conducted relief operations around Lissjanka with support from the Luftwaffe and made contact with the 1st Panzer Division on the 14th. However, in the attempt to break 1.Pz.Div out from encirclement, the 506th was forced to withdraw and destroy 3 of its own tanks in the process. At the beginning of March, the remaining 24 Tiger tanks of the 506th were transferred to the 503rd Heavy Panzer Battalion and the unit marched to Lemberg for reconstitution.

=== Dnieper River Defense ===
On 29 March, the 506th began receiving Tiger I tanks. A total of 45 were delivered between that day and 8 April. On 2 April, the unit was ordered to Pomorjany with 22 tanks operational. Supporting the 227th Jäger Regiment of the 100th Jäger Division on 4 April, the western portion of Podhajtzi was taken. By 6 April, the unit had 14 operational Tigers. It succeeded in breaking through Soviet defensive positions west of Brangelowka, destroying 12 enemy tanks in the process. The following day, the 506th destroyed a further 20 tanks while defending against Soviet counterattacks. The unit continued to fight alongside the 100th Jäger Division until 10 April.

Following a march to Slobodka, 22 Tigers were assembled before supporting Pz.Gren.Rgt.73 of the 19th Panzer Division in operations on the 16th. The 2nd company, commanded by Oberleutnant Brandt, assaulted Isakow on 19 April and followed this with defensive operations on the 20th. During the defense, Oberleutnant Brandt was killed and Oberfeldwebel Leihbauer's Tiger was knocked out when ambushed by a Soviet self-propelled gun.

On 21 April, the 506th was again on the offensive, supporting the 1st Infantry Division (Wehrmacht). Five tanks were also employed with the 23rd Panzer Regiment in a successful attack northeast of Zaborkruki, but all five vehicles broke down. Two Tigers were total write-offs. By 29 April, Chocimierz had been captured by the 506th in tandem with Panzer-Regiment 23.

Over the next several days, the 506th's remaining Tigers alongside the 23rd Panzer Regiment fought a series of tug-of-war skirmishes with Soviet forces. IS-1 tanks were encountered during this period, with one captured by German forces on 1 May. A Tiger of the 506th's third company was knocked out by one of these Soviet heavy tanks the next day. For the remainder of the month, the unit was attached to the 17th Panzer Division.

On 1 June, the 506th was equipped with two Bergetiger recovery vehicles. With its 39 operational Tiger Is, the unit supported the retreat of the 1st Infantry Division across the Dnjestr for much of June before being recalled to an assembly area in Slobodka. In mid-July, it marched 100 km (62 mi) towards Zlozow where it fought in a series of unsuccessful relief attempts (for the encircled XIII. Armee-Korps) from the 16th to the 21st. Oberleutnant Panzl, commander of the 3rd company, was killed in action on 17 July when his tank was destroyed, leaving the unit with 40 operational tanks as of 18 July.

The 506th fought a series of engagements from 18–24 July, withdrawing southwest to evade encirclement. Most of the unit's Tigers had to be destroyed to prevent capture. This was followed by a march for the next couple of days, during which one Tiger I broke through a 24-ton bridge. From 27–28 July, the 506th fought near Kudlatowka and Kalesch before being relieved and relocated to Munkatsch. The unit's 6 remaining operational Tigers were transferred to the 507th Heavy Panzer Battalion. On 15 August, the unit began transfer to Ohrdruf for refitting. This marked the end of the 506th's service on the Eastern Front. It would remain in the West for the remainder of the war.

=== Operation: Market Garden ===
The 506th received a full complement of 45 Tiger II tanks from 20 August to 12 September 1944 and was entrained to the Netherlands, arriving in Zevenaar on the night of 23/24 September and attached to 1.Fallschirm-Panzer Armee. The battalion's headquarters and 1./s.Pz.Abt.506 were sent to Aachen while the King Tigers of 2./s.Pz.Abt.506 (under Hauptmann Wacker) and 3./s.Pz.Abt.506 (under Hauptmann Otto) were assigned to 10th SS Panzer Division (10.SS.Pz.Div) and 9th SS Panzer Division (9.SS.Pz.Div), respectively, and deployed to counter Operation Market Garden.

2./s.Pz.Abt.506 fought with 10.SS.Pz.Div south of the Rhine River in the area of Elst (between Arnhem and Nijmegen). On 1 October, the first day of 10.SS.Pz.Div's counterattack, eight Tigers were lost. Four of these were later recovered, but the remainder were total write-offs. The road conditions in the area were poor and ill-suited for the Tigers; east of Elst, two tanks slid off of a narrow road and bogged down in the ditch. The first of these was subsequently disabled by British PIAT fire. After being hit, an explosion ripped the 15-ton turret from the vehicle. The second of the bogged down Tigers, tank 2-03, was not destroyed but had to be abandoned due to a lack of recovery vehicles. There is a photo of two burned out Jagdtiger tank destroyers (destroyed by air attack) originally captioned as being taken in Elst. If the caption is accurate, it would account for the other two losses suffered by the 506th in the area and would indicate one of the first combat deployments of the vehicle. This would be supported by British reports that mention two "Ferdinand" tank hunters knocked out in the same manner. Other sources, however, indicate the photo was taken near Letmathe, Germany in 1945 and depicts two vehicles of s.Pz.Jg.Abt.512. In either case, the 506th's records for 1 October indicate a loss of four "Tigers" as total write-offs, yet the battalion inventory of Tiger II tanks only decreases by two vehicles. The next day, five tanks of the company were deployed with the 116th Panzer Division "Windhund" in another attack northeast of Elst, but the advance was again halted by Allied counterattacks.

Destroyed Tiger II of 3./s.Pz.Abt.506 in Oosterbeek

3./s.Pz.Abt.506 was deployed with KG Spindler and Allwoerden in the southeastern sector of Oosterbeek. The Tigers had difficulty operating in the narrow confines of urban combat for which they were not designed. The company lost a single Tiger II in Oosterbeek near the town's school. British paratroopers engaged it with a 6-pounder (57mm) anti-tank gun, hitting the right track and immobilizing the vehicle. A 75 mm howitzer was also used and the vehicle caught fire before being finished off by close range hits from PIAT anti-tank launchers. By this time, while the 506th was a veteran unit, a number of replacement crews lacked experience as the unit had only just finished its refit at the beginning of the month.

=== Battle of Aachen and Operation: Queen ===
On 7 October, 3 of the 4 tanks in a platoon at Alsdorf were knocked out by the American 743rd Tank Destroyer Battalion. Further fighting ensued on the 11th and 12th while the unit was in the midst of redeployment. Assembly was finished by 14 October and this was followed over the next several days by fighting alongside the 3rd Panzergrenadier Division in the area of the Probsteier Forest. On the 15th, Unteroffizier Wiedeschitz's tank shot down an enemy aircraft; he would receive a commendation certificate for this occurrence. By 20 October the 506th had 18 tanks operational out of 35 total. The unit was redeployed to Gereonsweiler after the fall of Aachen the next day.

The unit had 35 operational Tigers on 1 November when it saw action with XXXVII Panzer Korps. Two additional Tigers were delivered the next day, and all but one of the battalion's 37 tanks were operational when the 506th was reassembled on 15 November near Merken.

Early in the morning on 17 November, the 506th supported Panthers of the 9th Panzer Division under Generalmajor Harald Freiherr von Elverfedt in a counterattack against the 2nd Armored Division at the town of Puffendorf. 2nd Armored was, itself, initiating an attack when the two tank forces clashed outside the town. The terrain was quite soft on the Roer plains, but the Americans had foreseen this; most of 2.A.D's tanks were fitted with extended end connectors on their tracks and additional measures were taken to minimize the chances of tanks bogging down. Despite this, 2.A.D's narrow-tracked M4 tanks struggled greatly in the mud and were outmaneuvered by the wider-tracked Tigers and Panthers. Within two days (16-17 November), 2.A.D's Combat Command B alone lost a staggering 52 medium tanks and 19 light tanks. The division had suffered its heaviest casualties of the war- more than double those of the initial D-Day landings.

During the battle of Puffendorf on the 17th, infantry action was largely inconsequential as both sides found their troops pinned by artillery fire for much of the fighting. The 506th lost 3 Tigers set ablaze by artillery fire from the 67th Artillery Regiment. The commander of one of these tanks and a platoon leader of the 3rd company, Stabsfeldwebel Kannenberg, would be awarded the Knight's Cross of the Iron Cross posthumously on 9 December. Exhausted of supplies and with few tanks left at 1600 hours, 2nd Armored was forced to withdraw into Puffendorf.

On the 19th, the American 702nd Tank Destroyer Battalion counterattacked with M10 GMC tank destroyers and new M36 GMCs (armed with 90mm gun). An M36 destroyed a Tiger of the 506th north of Freialdenhoven with a shot to the turret side at 1,000 m (3,300 ft). On 20 November, the Americans again attacked. The 506th and 9. Panzer were able to slow the advance to a halt, but not before the towns of Gereonsweiler and Ederen were captured. The 506th supported the 12th Volksgrenadier Division three days later in a counterattack near Pützlohn. Before 27 November, the 506th lost another Tiger in Ederen when the inexperienced crew made a U-turn after receiving hits. This gave M4 tanks of 2nd Armored a shot at the thinner rear armor and the vehicle was knocked out by a hit to the engine compartment. On 1 December, the 506th was withdrawn to Grevenbroich with 11 tanks operational out of 30 total. Twelve additional Tigers were delivered from the 8th to the 13th, but tank 2-11 (lead vehicle of the 2nd company's 3rd platoon) was captured by the American 129th Ordnance Battalion in Gereonsweiler on the 15th.

Tank 2-11 was captured by the 129th Ordnance Battalion on 15 December

=== Ardennes ===
The 506th was one of two Tiger battalions to take part in the initial "Operation: Watch on the Rhine," the other being the 501st SS Heavy Panzer Battalion. The unit was transported to Eifel in preparation for the offensive, but orders were changed and the unit marched south before engaging in a skirmish at Andler on 17 December. The 506th and schwere Panzerabteilung 301 "Funklenk" were assigned to the 6th Panzer Army and on the 18th schwere Panzer-Kompanie "Hummel" was consolidated with the 506th. S.Pz.Kp "Hummel" had fought alongside the 506th previously during Market Garden. This formed the fourth company "Feuerwehr" (fire brigade) and reintroduced the Tiger I to the unit for the first time since being transferred to the Western Front. The same day, one of five Tiger IIs en route to Lullingerkamp was destroyed at close range, forcing the others to withdraw. The unit saw further action later in the day, knocking out three tanks and six anti-tank guns. Another Tiger was knocked out on 19 December when American tanks en route to Bastogne engaged the 506th.

Over the course of the next several days the 506th fought a number of further engagements in Luxembourg, losing an additional Tiger on 24 December during an attack on Andler. The unit's assembly area in Eschdorf was attacked from the air on 25 December and two additional Tigers were destroyed. From 31 December to 1 January 1945, the 506th fought in the Bastogne area before being transferred west of Michamps to support the 12th SS Panzer Division. On 2 January, fighting near Wardin alongside the 12th SS saw the destruction of some 15 Sherman tanks. The following day, the 506th lost another Tiger to fire from the 81st Anti-tank Battalion; the hit caused an explosion that blew the turret from the hull.

From 8 to 13 January, the 506th fought a series of engagements in the area, losing two vehicles on 13 January to bring the total count of Tigers to 33. One tank suffered a final drive failure and the other was lost to fire from the 6th Armored Division when sent to recover the broken-down tank.

Two further Tiger IIs and a single Tiger I were destroyed by their own crews when the Americans broke out of Bastogne in mid-January. Eberhard Lange, now a Major, was relieved by Generaloberst Hasso von Manteuffel and command given to Hauptmann Heiligenstadt. The Headquarters and four combat companies prepared for reconstitution at the beginning of February with no operational tanks. Heiligenstadt's command was cut short when he was captured along with Hauptmann Wacker and Leutnant Bopp while conducting reconnaissance on 9 February. Hautpmann Jobst-Christoph von Römer was given command and on 16 February the 4th company was detached from the 506th with five operational Tiger Is; eight had seen combat in the Ardennes during the company's time with the 506th. On 26 February a Tiger of the 506th knocked out three American tanks near Irsch and the unit would see numerous small skirmishes throughout the month of March near Weinsheim.

=== End of the War ===
On 5 March 1945, the Americans broke through at Kyllburg and three Tigers of the 506th were knocked out. The advance was halted, but an additional five tanks were destroyed by their crew. On 6 March, with seven Tigers available in running order, the unit conducted offensive operations with the 340th Volksgrenadier Division, but another six tanks were destroyed the following day near Boxberg. With a pair of Tigers restored, the battalion was left with three operational tanks out of 15 total. Two new tanks were delivered to the unit in Welcherath on 8 March and dug into defensive positions, but they were destroyed by the unit due to a lack of fuel. The same day, the unit's trucks and wheeled vehicles, along with tankless crewmen, assembled near Hoehr-Grenzhausen.

Thirteen new Tigers were scheduled for delivery on 12 March, but they failed to arrive. Four of these vehicles were deployed instead in defense (without fuel) by Kampfgruppe Dunker with elements of the 116th Panzer Division at Beckum. As of 15 March, the 506th had two operational tigers, but received seven additional tanks on 20 March - transferred from the 501st SS Heavy Panzer Battalion. The battalion, with 22 total vehicles, received a complement of Jagdtiger tank destroyers from the 512th heavy tank destroyer battalion on 22 March and the next day was joined by the 654th heavy tank destroyer battalion to form Panzergruppe Hudel. The unit launched a counterattack against American forces on 24 March but failed to progress and subsequently withdrew towards Siegen the next day. On 26 March, a Jagdtiger and two Tiger IIs were destroyed by their crew after being immobilized by suspension damage. The unit crossed the Sieg River near Wissen and the remaining Jagdtigers detached from the unit.

The Tigers of the 506th engaged in defensive operations in and around Siegen for the next four days before being ordered to Schmallenberg; three tanks were left behind; destroyed by their crew outside Siegen. On 2 April, another shipment of six tanks from the 501st SS was received and 11 of the remaining Tigers marched 100 km (62 mi) on 3–4 April to join the 3rd Panzergrenadier Division in defensive operations. Three tanks broke down during the march.

The 506th continued marches through 6 April when it was attached to Panzer Brigade 106 "Feldherrnhalle" with three Tigers in running order (eight having broken down in the preceding marches). Over the next few days, the 506th fought a series of skirmishes alongside the 176th Infantry Division and 338th Infantry Division. On 10 April, the battalion had seven operational tanks, but one was knocked out the following day near Marmecke. On 12 April, with most tanks out of fuel, the unit moved into the Eslohe-Kobbenrode area and a single Tiger was deployed east of Werdohl. On 13 April, the unit moved into Iserlohn and the tank crew served as infantry south of the city. On 14 April, s.Pz.Abt.506 was disbanded by Hauptmann von Römer in Iserlohn.

== Commanders ==
- Major Gerhard Willing (8 May 1943 – 29 October 1943). KIA 29-10-1943
- Major Eberhard Lange (28 November 1943 - ? January 1945). Relieved January 1945
- Hauptmann Heligenstadt (? January 1945 - 9 February 1945). POW 9-2-1945
- Hauptmann Jobst-Christoph von Römer (9 February 1945 – 14 April 1945). Unit dissolution

== See also ==
- German heavy tank battalion
- Panzer division
