= 508th Heavy Panzer Battalion =

- schwere Panzerabteilung 508 — s PzAbt 508— II
- Active: 1943–1945
- Country: Germany
- Branch: German Heer
- Type: Panzer
- Role: Armoured warfare
- Size: Battalion, up to 45 tanks
- Part of: Wehrmacht
- Equipment: Tiger I (1943–1945)
- Engagements: Italian Campaign (World War II)

Insignia
- Bison

The 508th Heavy Panzer Battalion (German: "schwere Panzerabteilung 508"; abbreviated: "s PzAbt 508") was a German heavy Panzer Abteilung (an independent battalion-sized unit), during World War II, equipped with heavy tanks. It fought at Anzio and later defended German-held Northern Italy opposing the Allies during the Italian Campaign. It fought in Italy until it surrendered at the end of the war in May 1945.

== Formation ==
The battalion was partially formed on 11 May 1943 in France using personnel from a battalion of the 29th Panzer Regiment. The third company was attached from the 313th Panzer Company (Funklenk) – a Tiger company equipped with Borgward B IV remotely controlled demolition vehicles. By 24 January 1944, the battalion was at full strength with 45 Tigers Is under the command of Major Hudel.

Organisation, February 1944
Battalion command 3 x Tiger I
1st company command 2 x Tiger I			2nd company command 2 x Tiger I			3rd company command 2 x Tiger I 8 x Borgward IV
1st platoon 4 x Tiger I	2nd platoon 4 x Tiger I	3rd platoon 4 x Tiger I	1st platoon 4 x Tiger I	2nd platoon 4 x Tiger I	3rd platoon 4 x Tiger I	1st platoon 4 x Tiger I 9 x Borgward IV	2nd platoon 4 x Tiger I 9 x Borgward IV	3rd platoon 4 x Tiger I 9 x Borgward IV

== Operations ==
=== Anzio ===
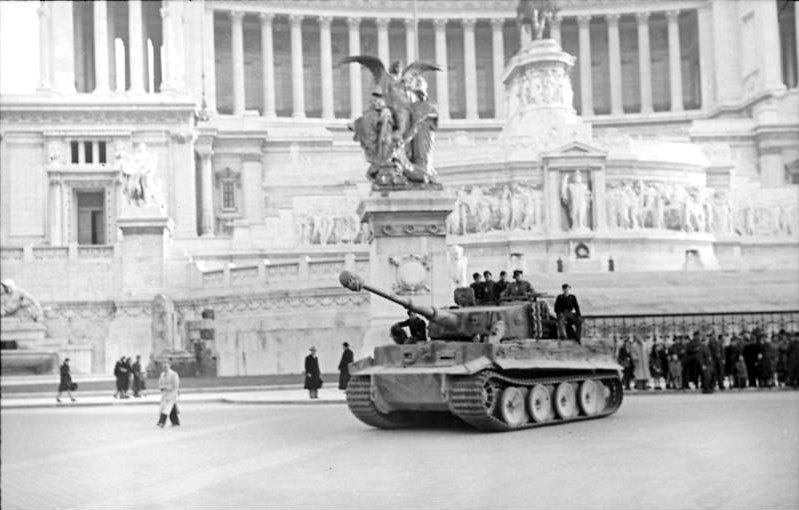
Tiger of the 508th in Rome, February 1944

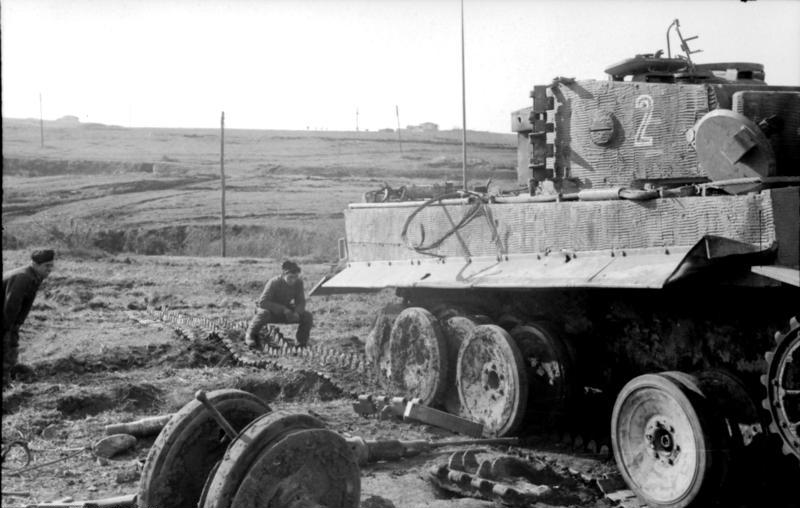
Tiger of the 508th with a thrown track, Italy, February 1944

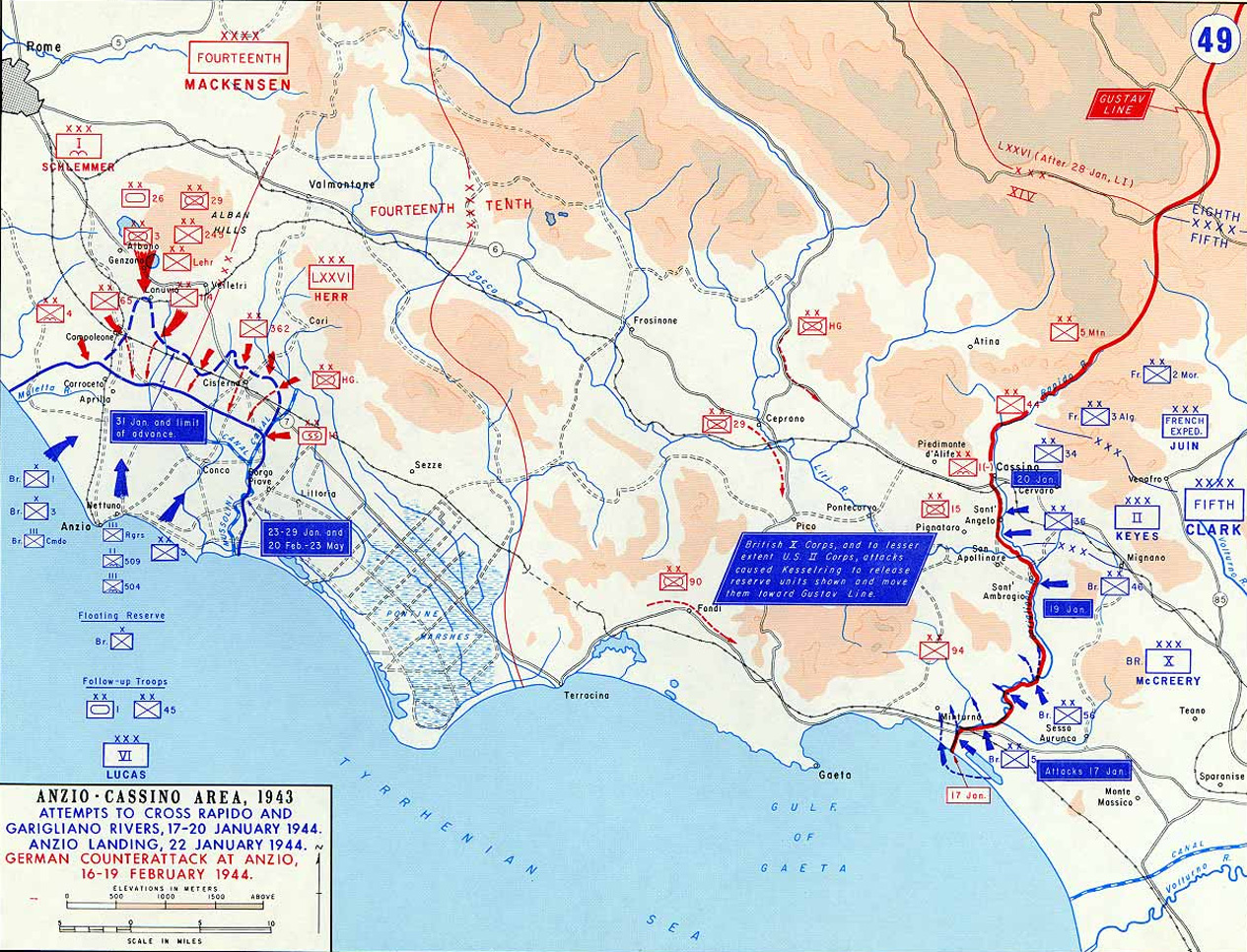
German attempts to destroy the beachhead

Moving to the Front.

In early February 1944 the battalion was sent to oppose Allied landings at Anzio. Transportation by rail ended at Ficulle in Italy, far from the enemy beachhead. Because Allied air superiority made further rail transport difficult, the battalion drove the remaining distance, via Rome. One Tiger caught fire en route and was destroyed in an explosion. Sixty percent of the Tigers suffered mechanical breakdown on the 200-kilometre (120 mi) journey through the narrow, winding, mountainous roads. By 14 February, the first company deployed piecemeal in the Anzio region near Aprilia (known as The Factory), as the second company arrived in Rome.

Attacking the beachhead.

On 15 February the battalion was attached to the 26th Panzer Division. A single platoon attempted to push toward the beachhead the next day, but muddy conditions foiled the operation.

On 19 February the second company reached Aprilia, and the attached 313th Funklenk Company was officially renamed as the third company of the battalion. The next day, the 653rd Heavy Panzerjäger Battalion, equipped with Elefant tank destroyers, was attached to the 508th.

Between 21 and 24 February, the battalion claimed twenty US tanks; seventeen while using small elements to support several unsuccessful attempts to reduce the beachhead from Aprilia, and three M4 Shermans which had penetrated German lines. In late February, two Shermans were captured; their turrets were removed and they were converted into recovery vehicles, greatly improving the ability of the battalion to recover damaged Tigers.

On 29 February the second company was part of the final attack towards the beachhead, from Cisterna. Its advance was restricted to roads surrounded by marshy areas, and the attack stalled due to strong resistance. Eight Tigers were disabled by anti tank fire from the American 601st Tank Destroyer Battalion, accurate naval artillery fire, and mines. All were recovered under enemy fire over the next five days, but four were later written off as beyond repair. After combat on 1 March the 508th was attached to the 69th Panzer Regiment, with only twelve Tigers operational. Eight Tiger Is absorbed from Tiger-Gruppe Schwebbach (formerly Schwere Panzer Kompanie Meyer) brought the battalion back up to full strength.

The battalion withdrew to Rome, staying there from 5 to 16 March, then, slightly over strength in tanks due to replacements, returned to the Aprilia—Campoleone—Cisterna area, where they resisted expansion of the beachhead. Unusually, Tigers were occasionally used in indirect fire roles. The Borgward IV demolition carriers had mobility problems in the muddy and mountainous conditions.

Allied breakout

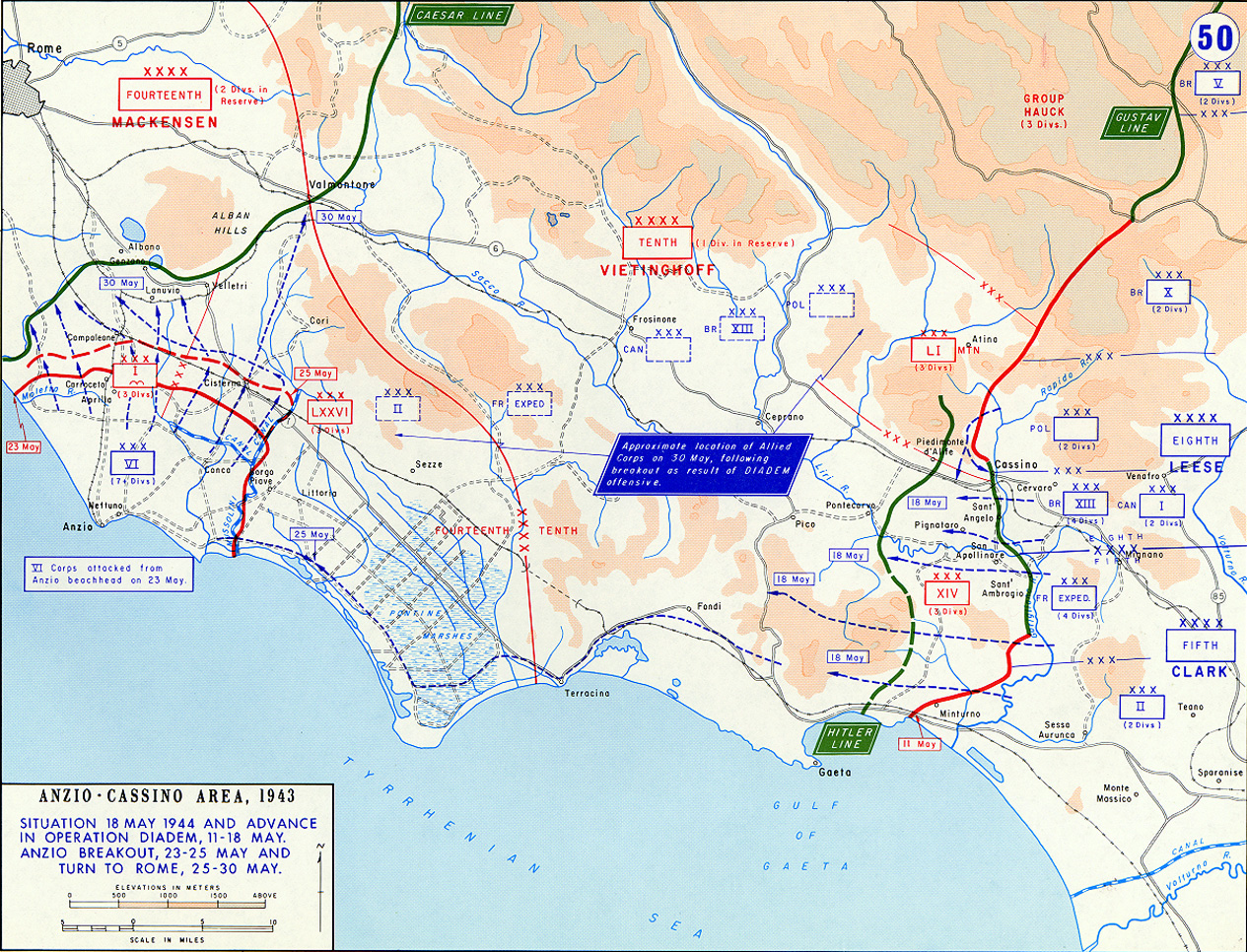
Area of operations, late May 1944

In late May, the Allies broke out from the Monte Cassino and the Anzio regions as Operation Diadem bore fruit. On 23 May the 508th claimed 15 Shermans destroyed during a German counter-attack against advancing Allied forces near Cisterna, for the loss of a single Tiger. The next day they started to withdraw to Rome; two tanks were lost to mechanical failure, seven more were destroyed by their crews in Cori due to lack of fuel, eleven more near Giulianello from breakdown, and another one near Valmontone on 25 May. This was a total loss of twenty-two Tigers in three days, with only one from combat. The battalion commander, Major Hudel, was recalled to the Führer Headquarters and sacked.

The remaining operational tanks were all placed in the first company, which then attempted to defend the Velletri area during 26–27 May, then withdrew near to Rome. Tank strength dropped from a high of 49 on 25 April, to 11 operational on 31 May. The spare crews were used as anti-tank teams.

=== German withdrawal ===
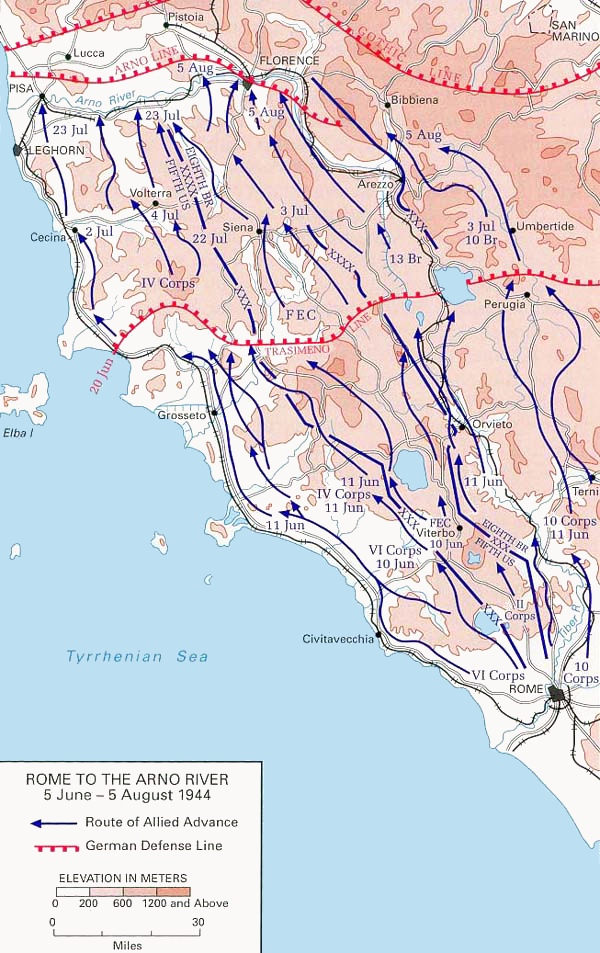
Withdrawal, June – August 1944

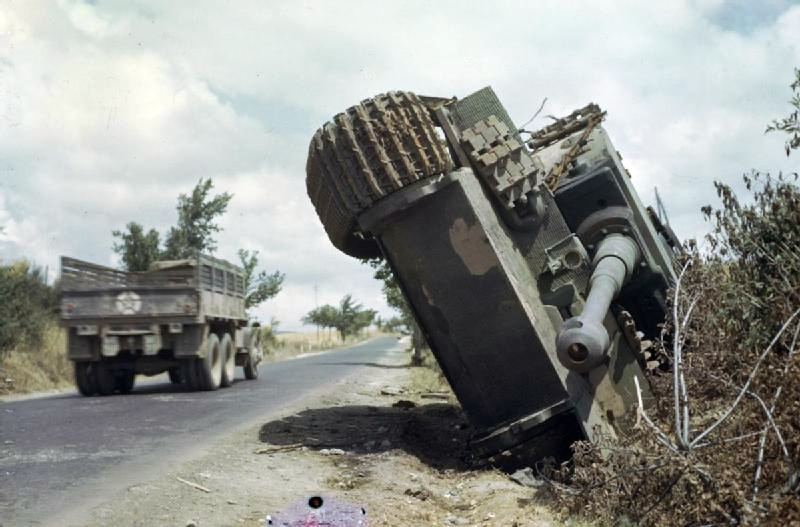
Tiger I of the 508th overturned on Poggibonsi Road (Highway 6), 20 miles (32 km) south of Florence, an American truck is passing by.

By 3 June 1944, a general fighting withdrawal to the Trasimene Line began as the Allies pressed northward, taking Rome the next day. Thirteen Tigers were lost moving towards Poggibonsi on 13 June, mostly destroyed by their crews. Two more were lost in action against five enemy tanks near Chiusdino on 27 June. On 4 July one Tiger fell into a cellar near Colle di Val d'Elsa; it was destroyed as unrecoverable. Six Shermans were destroyed near Tavarnelle on 8 July.

Despite complaints by battalion command, orders from Army Group were to widely disperse the Tigers in defense. Often, single tanks were involved in combat, which caused severe command, control and logistic problems.

The 508th moved to San Casciano by 23 July. On 24 July a tank fell through a bridge and burned. The next day an enemy attack was repelled, but another Tiger fell through a cellar and was destroyed. On 29 July seven Shermans were knocked out for the cost of two Tigers. One Tiger was captured on 30 July near Galluzzo.

=== Eastern Italy ===
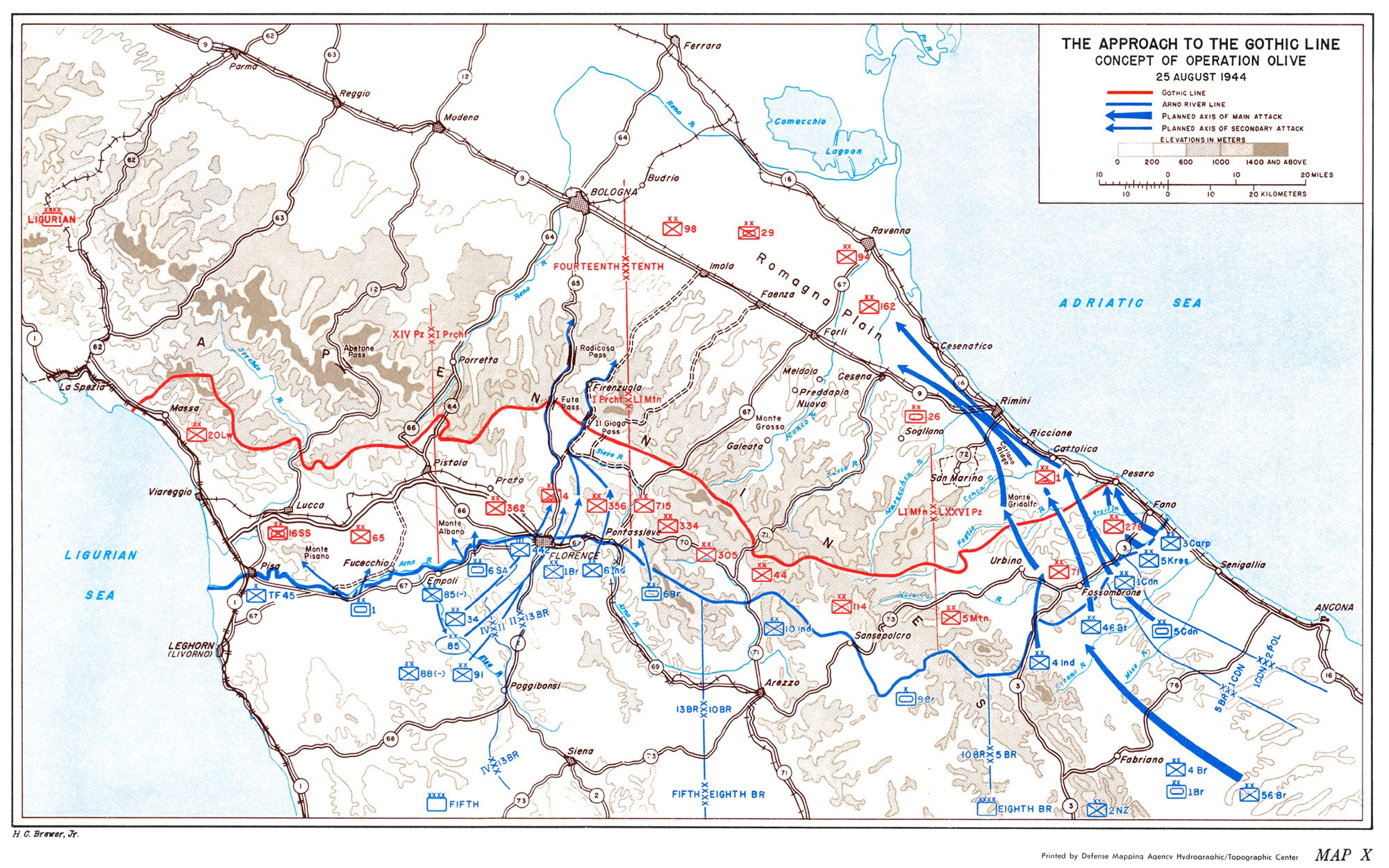
Area of operations August – October 1944

On 1 August 1944, only fourteen Tigers were operational out of a total of twenty-eight available; all surviving second company tanks were assigned to the third company. The 508th reached the vicinity of Pisa on 14 August. A week later, Hauptmann Stelter was made battalion commander. In early September the first company moved across to Savignano in eastern Italy, eleven tanks were lost to mechanical problems during the road march. The personnel of the second company, which had no tanks, returned to Paderborn in Germany.

The Canadian 5th Armoured Division fought an action in Coriano on September 13 where they were ambushed by Tigers, likely from the first company.

After a day of rest in Bologna on 14 September, the third company moved via Imola, Faenza, and Forlì to Cesena by 30 September, positioned to oppose the impending northwards thrust of the British Adriatic front of Allied Operation Olive.

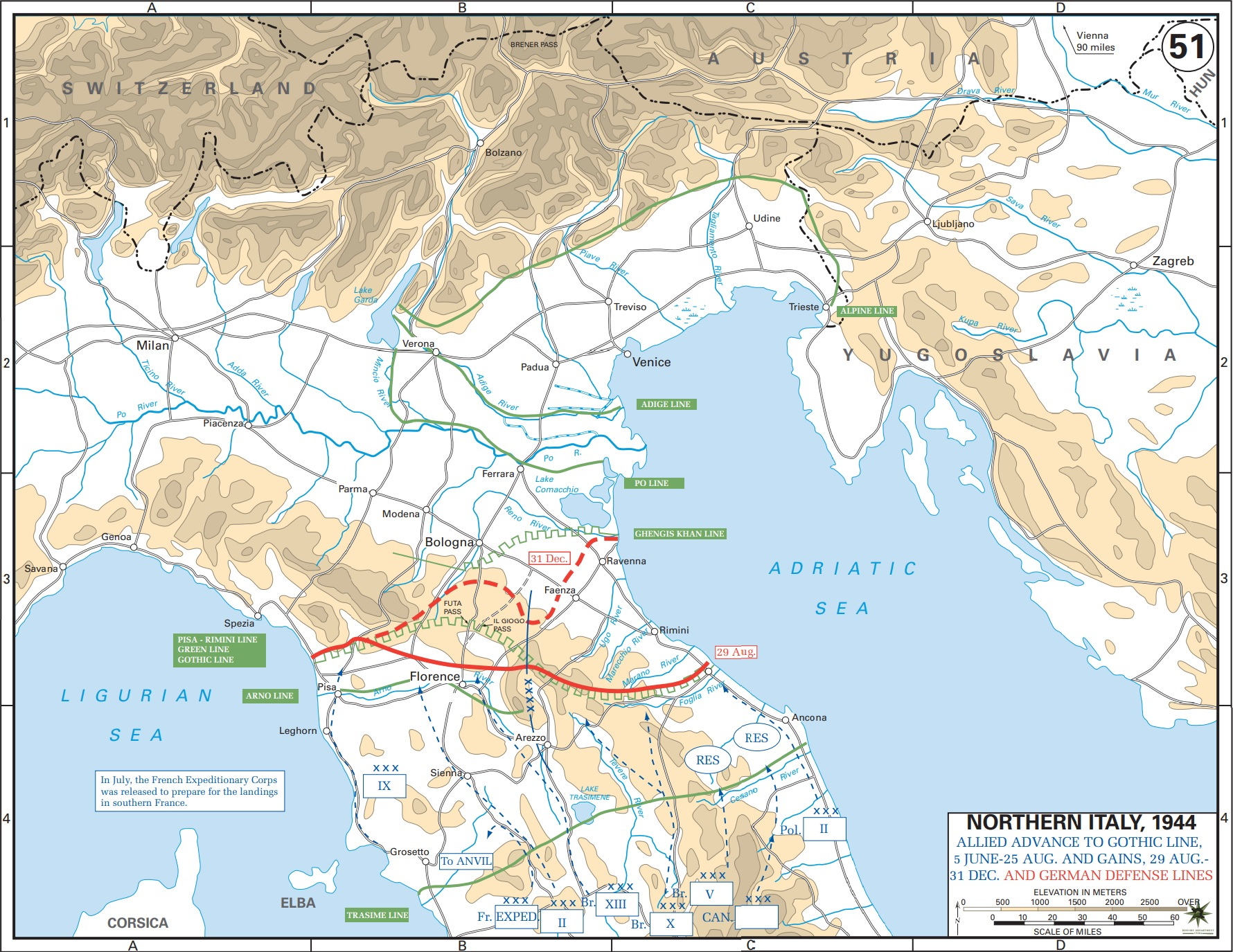
Area of operations, late 1944

On 1 October, fifteen Tigers were operational, ten in the first company, three in the third; both were then attached to LXXVI Panzer Corps. Later in the month, the German lines were pushed back to Northern Italy. On 20 October, the demolition carriers were sent back to Germany.

On 1 November, fourteen tanks were operational. By the end of the month, the personnel previously of the Funklenk company were sent back to Germany, disbanding the third company. Only ten operational tanks of the fifteen available in the first company remained in Italy, initially resting in Ospitale. By the end of December some replacement crews arrived. After returning to the front, the company saw action in Faenza on 1 January 1945, then south of Solarolo on 3 January. Throughout January and early February the tanks were frequently used in the artillery role.

=== Destruction ===
On 12 February 1945, the last fifteen Tigers were transferred to the 504th Heavy Tank Battalion, which continued to fight in Italy; it lost all of its tanks by late April and surrendered 3 May.

The remaining personnel who were not transferred rested in Pontebba on 21 February, then returned through Austria to Germany. They started training for the Tiger II on 17 March, but were given a single Tiger I and six Panther tanks on 27 March, and formed a small Kampfgruppe. The second company, still without tanks, were used as infantry. These forces fought near Husen on 29–30 March, Paderborn and Scherfelde on 1–2 April, then Hofgeismar and Polle on 5 April before withdrawing to Berlin, which surrendered in early May 1945.

Over its lifetime, the battalion claimed to have knocked out more than 100 enemy tanks; 59 percent of its own 78 losses were from crews destroying their vehicles, while only 19 percent were destroyed by the Allied forces.

== Commanders ==
- Major Helmut Hudel (January 1944 – May 1944) (dismissed)
- Hauptmann Stelter (August 1944 – May 1945)

=== See also ===
- German heavy tank battalion
- Organisation of a SS Panzer Division
- Panzer Division
