= 509th Heavy Panzer Battalion =

- Active: 9. September 1943- 8. May 1945
- Country: Nazi Germany
- Branch: Army
- Type: Panzer
- Size: Battalion
- Equipment: Tiger I (1943–1945); Tiger II (1944–1945)

Insignia
- Identification symbol

The 509th Heavy Panzer Battalion (German: "schwere Panzerabteilung 509"; abbreviated: "s PzAbt 509") was a German heavy Panzer Abteilung (an independent battalion-sized unit), equipped with heavy tanks, during the Second World War.

== History ==
The 509th was ordered formed on 9 September 1943, taking most of its personnel from Panzer-Regiment 204 of the disbanded 22nd Panzer Division. The battalion received forty-five Tiger Is. It was committed to action in Ukraine as a part of Army Group South. Reaching the Front in October 1943, the 509th saw action near Kirovograd and Krivoi Rog, and participated in Wehrmacht's retreat.

In early 1944, the 509th was involved in the Second Battle of Kiev and then retreated across Ukraine. In late May, the depleted 509th was pulled back for refitting. After receiving a full complement of Tiger 1s, the battalion was sent back to the front on 1 June 1944. On 22 June 1944, the Red Army launched Operation Bagration, and the 509th, attached to Army Group Centre, was in their line of advance. On 8 September 1944, the detachment lost sixteen Tigers in under 24 hours near Kielce, Poland.

In late September the battalion was pulled back to be equipped with Tiger IIs. After it had received forty-five new Tiger IIs in December 1944, the detachment was attached to IV SS Panzer Corps, which was preparing an attempt to relieve the encircled garrison of Budapest. Launched on 18 January 1945, the operation, codenamed Konrad III, was ultimately a failure. During the operation, the 509th had lost forty of its forty-five Tiger IIs, with ten being total losses.

The 509th was transferred to III Corps, to support Operation Frühlingserwachen in March, and retreating to Vienna. It took part in the Battle of Vienna in April, before retreating to the American lines. On 9 May 1945, the 509th surrendered to the U.S. Army near Linz.

== Commanders ==
- Hauptmann Hannibal von Lüttichau (? Aug 1943 - ? Nov 1943)
- Hauptmann Hans-Jürgen Burmester (? Mar 1944 - ? Feb 1945)

== See also ==
- German heavy tank battalion
- Organisation of a SS Panzer Division
- Panzer Division
