= 503rd Heavy Panzer Battalion =

- schwere Panzerabteilung 503 — s PzAbt 503—
- Active: 4 May 1942 – 8 May 1945
- Country: Germany
- Branch: German Heer
- Type: Panzer
- Role: Armoured warfare
- Size: Battalion, up to 45 tanks
- Part of: Wehrmacht
- Equipment: Tiger I (1942–1945); Tiger II (1944–1945)
- Engagements: Eastern Front: Third Battle of Kharkov; Battle of Kursk; Korsun–Shevchenkovsky Offensive; Kamenets-Podolsky pocket; Siege of Budapest; Operation Southwind; Western Front: Operation Overlord; Operation Goodwood

Insignia
- Identification symbol

The 503rd Heavy Panzer Battalion (German: schwere Panzerabteilung 503; abbreviated: "s.Pz.Abt. 503") was a German heavy Panzer Abteilung (independent battalion-sized unit) equipped with Tiger I and Panzer III tanks. In 1944, it was re-equipped with the new Tiger II. The battalion saw action on the Eastern and Western Fronts during World War II. As with other German heavy tank battalions, it was normally not assigned to a single corps, but shuffled around according to war circumstances. Later the battalion became part of the newly formed Panzer Corps Feldherrnhalle as the Feldherrnhalle Heavy Tank Battalion.

== World War II ==
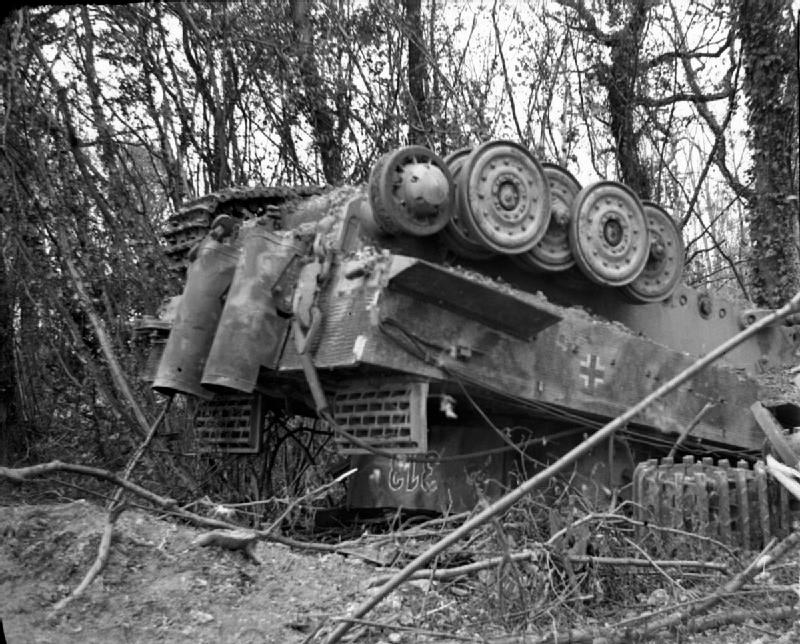
A Tiger I of the 503rd battalion overturned at Manneville by the bombing during Operation Goodwood.

The unit was created on May 4, 1942. The unit consisted of 45 Tiger Is on May 10, 1943. In the aftermath of the Battle of Stalingrad, the battalion was deployed to Army Group Don and arrived at the front on January 1, 1943. The battalion, along with several divisions of the 4th Panzer Army, was tasked with securing the withdrawal of Army Group A; it then retreated to Rostov. On February 11, 1943, the unit was transferred to Kharkov. It took part in the Third Battle of Kharkov and the Operation Citadel in 1943. Four days before the start of Citadel, the battalion reported that 42 of their 45 Tiger tanks were operational. The unit lost three Tigers during the operation and five more during the subsequent retreat.

In January 1944, the battalion, together with a panzer regiment and infantry units, formed Panzer Regiment Bäke. The regiment was part of the relief force, which tried to unsuccessfully break through to encircled forces in the Battle of the Korsun–Cherkassy Pocket. The battalion was then trapped in the Kamenets-Podolsky pocket and lost most of its tanks. In late April 1944, the regiment was dissolved and sent West for refitting and equipped with 45 new Tiger IIs.

In Operation Overlord, the invasion of Normandy on June 6, 1944, the unit was transferred to the command of 5th Panzer Army. On the launch of Operation Goodwood, the 3rd company, which was based in Cagny, Calvados, was destroyed in the preliminary Allied bombing, with impacts powerful enough to turn a 56-ton Tiger upside down. Only one Tiger was operational at the end of the day. During the first day of Goodwood, the unit reported the loss of thirteen tanks.

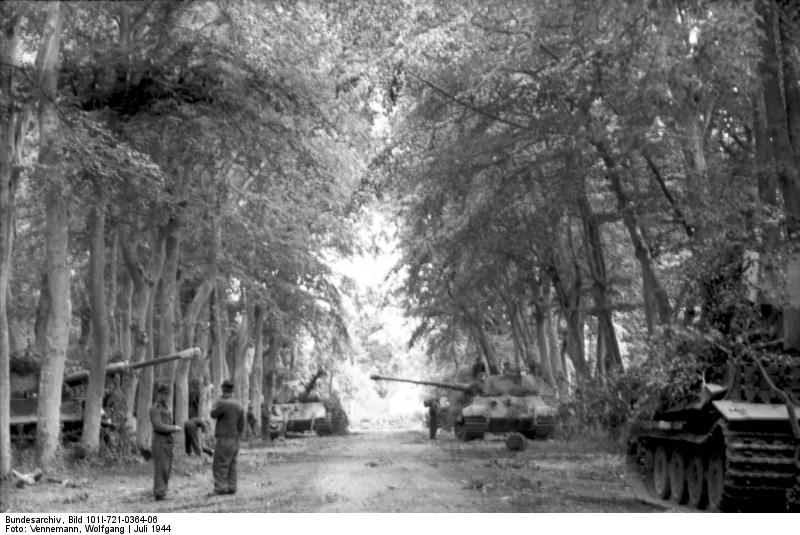
July 1944 at Château Canteloup, Panzer VI (Tiger II, Königstiger) of the 503rd battalion.

At the end of July, the 3rd company received new Tiger II tanks, which were subsequently destroyed in the Allied aerial attacks, with only two brought back to Germany. In October 1944, the refitted 503rd took part in the Battle of Debrecen. In early-November, the battalion provided a mobile reserve for the 6th Army (Wehrmacht), re-designated as Army Group Hermann Balck. By mid-December, the German forces had been pushed back to Budapest. In January 1945, the unit took part in several failed attempts to relieve Budapest, code-named Operation Konrad. Through the 17-24 of February, the 503rd took part in one of the last successful German offensives of the war, Operation Südwind (G:Southwind).

== Commanders ==
- ??? Post (May 1942 - 28 January 1943)
- Erich Hoheisel (28 January 1943 – May 1943)
- Clemens-Heinrich Graf von Kageneck (July 1943 – 30 January 1944)
- Rolf Fromme (February 1944 – December 1944)
- Nordwin von Diest-Körber (December 1944 – February 1945)
- Fritt Herzig (February 1945 – May 1945)

== See also ==
- German heavy tank battalion
- Organisation of a SS Panzer Division
- Panzer division

== Bibliography ==
- Jentz, Thomas (1996). Panzertruppen 2: The Complete Guide to the Creation & Combat Employment of Germany's Tank Force 1943-1945. Schiffer. ISBN 978-0-7643-0080-6.
- Lochmann, Franz-Wilhelm (2009). Erinnerungen an die Tiger-Abteilung 503: die schwere Panzerabteilung 503 an den Brennpunkten der Front in Ost und West [Memories of the Tiger Battalion 503: The Heavy Tank Battalion 503 at the Focal Points of the Eastern and Western Front] (in German). Flechsig. ISBN 978-3-88189-779-2.
- Lochmann, Franz-Wilhelm; von Rosen, Richard, Freiherr & Rubbel, Alfred, eds. (2008) [2000]. The Combat History of German Tiger Tank Battalion 503 in World War II. Stackpole Books. ISBN 0-8117-3484-6.
- Schneider, Wolfgang (2004) [2000]. Tigers in Combat. Vol. I. Stackpole Books. ISBN 0-8117-3171-5.
- Schneider, Wolfgang (2011) [2004]. Tigers in Normandy. Stackpole Books. ISBN 978-0-8117-1029-9.
- Wilbeck, Christopher W. (2004). Sledgehammers: Strengths and Flaws of Tiger Tank Battalions in World War II. Aberjona Press. ISBN 0-9717650-2-2.
