= Operation Southwind =

1945 German offensive in Nitra Region, Hungary

Operation Südwind
- Part of the Eastern Front of World War II
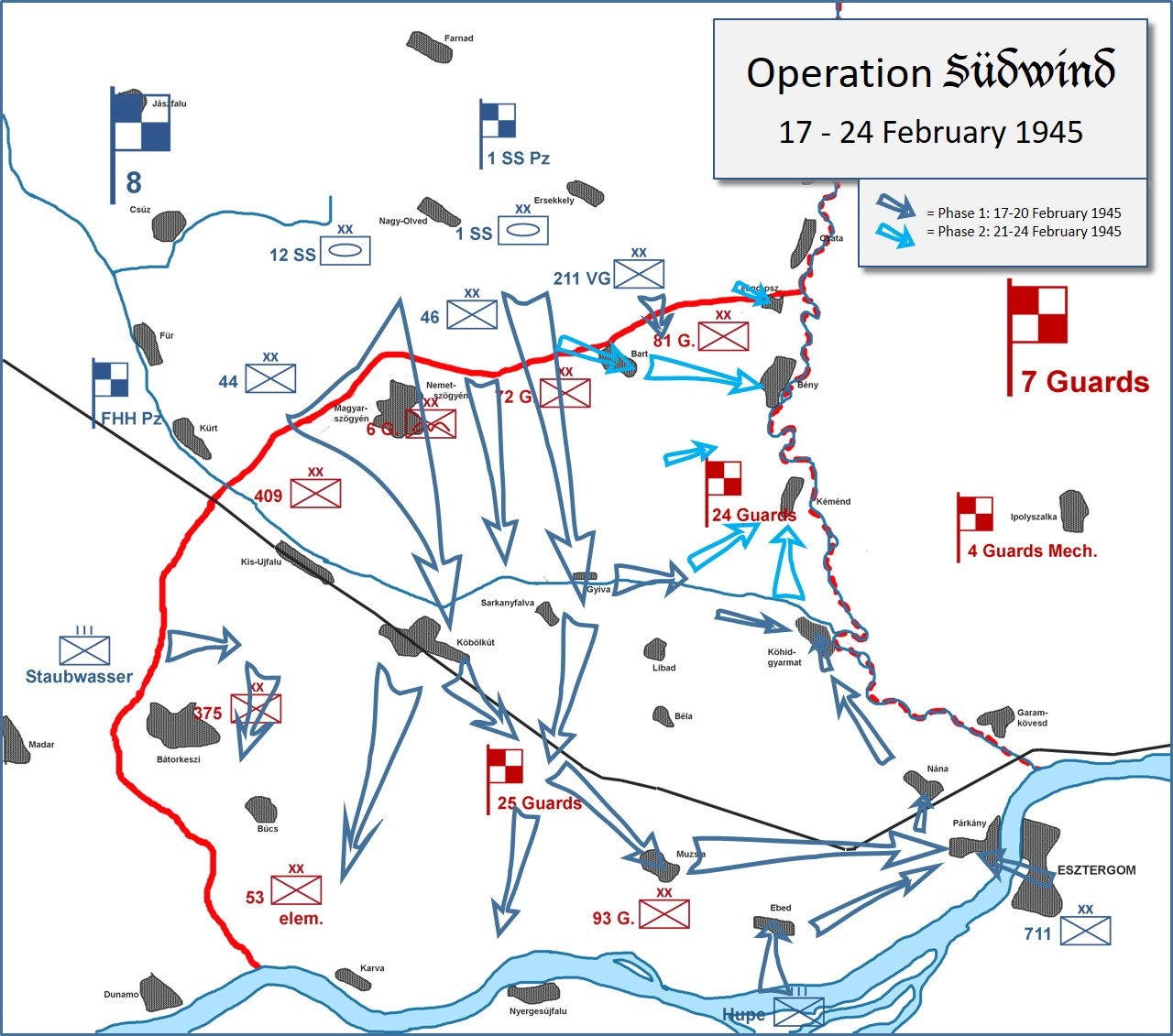
Date	17–24 February 1945
Location	Nitra Region, Hungary (Now Slovakia)
Result	German victory

Belligerents
Germany	Soviet Union

Commanders and leaders
(Nazi Germany) Hans Kreysing (8. Armee)	(Soviet Union) Mikhail Shumilov (7th Guards Army)

Operation Southwind (German: Unternehmen Südwind) was a German offensive operation on the Eastern Front in Hungary, (Note: As the southern parts of Slovakia were annexed by Hungary in November 1938, as a result of the First Vienna Award and only returned in 1947, the geographical names in this article are the Hungarian ones) from 17–24 February 1945. The Germans succeeded in eliminating the Soviet bridgehead on the west bank of the river Hron in preparation for Operation Spring Awakening. This was one of the last successful German offensives in the Second World War.

== Prelude ==
The Budapest Offensive was the general attack by Red Army against Hungary. This offensive lasted from 29 October 1944 until the fall of Budapest on 13 February 1945. By that time, in Hitler’s estimation, the Nagykanizsa oilfields in Hungary were the most strategically valuable oil reserves on the Eastern Front. Hitler ordered Sepp Dietrich's 6th SS Panzer Army to move to Hungary in order to protect the oilfields and refineries there. The 6th SS Panzer Army was to be the spearhead of Operation Spring Awakening. The units of the 6th SS Panzer Army were to be smuggled into Hungary with utmost care and secrecy. Each unit received a cover name.
A potential threat to this operation was the Soviet bridgehead on the west bank of the river Hron. This bridgehead was formed during the month January 1945. The OKH decided to eliminate this bridgehead, before the launching of Spring Awakening.

== The plan ==
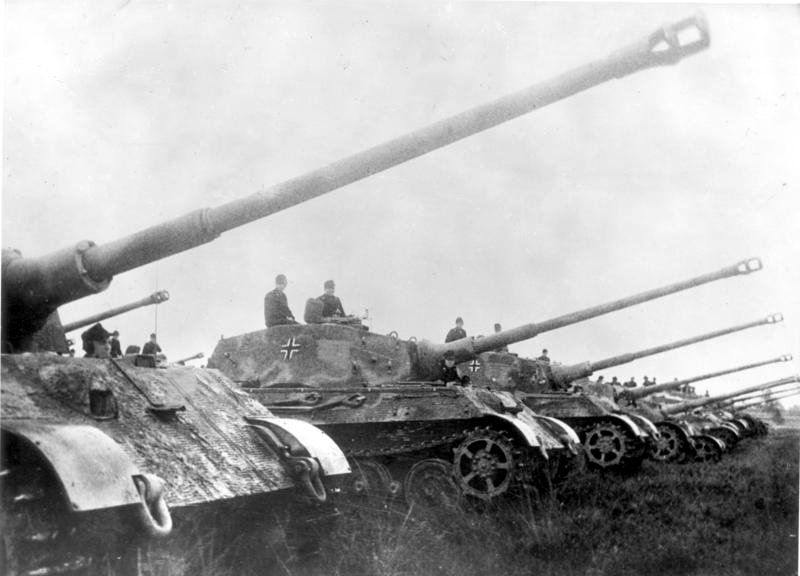
Tiger II tanks fitted with the narrower "vehicle-transport tracks" of the 503. Schwere Panzer Abteilung, the predecessor of the Schwere Panzer Abteilung "Feldherrnhalle", posing in formation in summer 1944 for Die Deutsche Wochenschau at the armour-training ground in Sennelager, Germany, prior to the unit's departure for Hungary

The planning for Operation Südwind was carried out by the German 8. Armee. Two Panzerkorps were to conduct the attack. The Panzerkorps “Feldherrnhalle”, already present in the area and the I. SS Panzerkorps, diverted from the Spring Awakening preparation. The amount of panzer and self-propelled guns was high, totaling 282 (including 44 Tiger II tanks in 2 Schwere Panzer Abteilungen).
The Soviets were defending the bridgehead with two Guards Rifle Corps (24th and 25th) of the 7th Guards Army of the 2nd Ukrainian Front. The main threat, the 6th Guards Tank Army, had been withdrawn to the east bank of the Hron for reconstitution. According to German air reconnaissance, the Soviets had established a deeply echeloned system of defenses, based on trenches supported by anti-tank block positions. A relative small amount of Soviet tanks (26) and self-propelled guns (5) was available in the bridgehead, but some reinforcements were to come in later.

The attack plan called for the infantry of Panzerkorps "Feldherrnhalle" to attack from the north, towards Magyarszögyén and Bart. The divisions from the I. SS Panzerkorps were then to take over, cross the Párizs Canal, and drive further via Muzsla towards the end-target Esztergom. Finally bridgeheads on the eastern bank of the Hron were to be established.

== Order of battle (16 February 1945) ==
=== The Axis forces ===
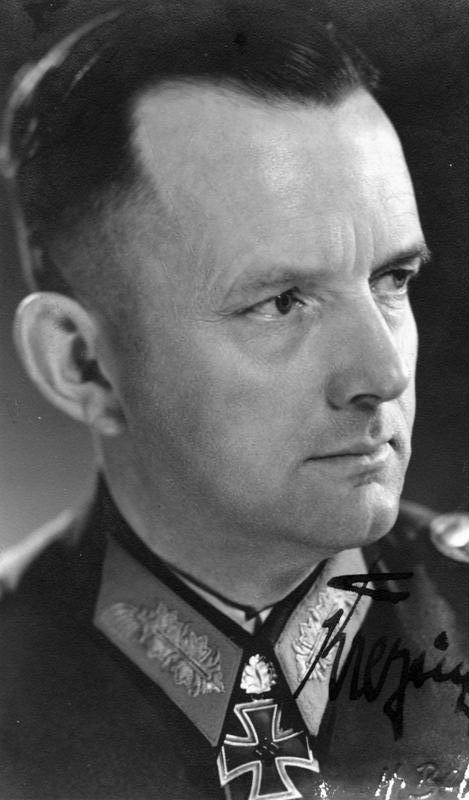
General der Gebirgstruppe Hans Kreysing

- Elements of the German 8. Armee (General der Gebirgstruppe Hans Kreysing)
  - I. SS Panzerkorps (SS-Gruppenführer Hermann Priess)
    - 1. SS-Panzer-Division “Leibstandarte-SS Adolf Hitler” (SS-Brigadeführer Otto Kumm)
      - Schwere SS-Panzer-Abteilung 501
    - 12. SS-Panzer-Division “Hitlerjugend” (SS-Brigadeführer Hugo Kraas)
  - Panzerkorps “Feldherrnhalle" (General der Panzertruppe Ulrich Kleemann)
    - 46. Infanterie Division (Generalmajor Erich Reuter)
    - 44. Reichsgrenadier-Division “Hoch- und Deutschmeister” (Generalleutnant Hans-Günther von Rost)
    - 211. Volksgrenadier Division (Generalmajor Johann-Heinrich Eckhardt))
    - Kampfgruppe of Panzerkorps "Feldherrnhalle" (Oberstleutnant Hans Schöneich)
      - Schwere Panzer Abteilung “Feldherrnhalle”
      - Panzer Abteilung 208
    - Kampfgruppe Staubwasser (3 battalions of 357. Infanterie Division)( Oberst i. G. Anton Staubwasser)
- Elements of the German 6. Armee (General der Panzertruppen Hermann Balck)
  - Elements of I. Kavallerie-Korps (General der Kavallerie Gustav Harteneck)
    - Kampfgruppe Hupe (part of 96. Infanterie Division)( Oberstleutnant Joachim-Friedrich Hupe)
    - 711. Infanterie Division (Generalleutnant Josef Reichert)

=== The Soviet forces ===
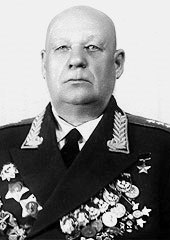
Colonel General M.S. Shumilov

- Elements of the Soviet 7th Guards Army (Colonel General Mikhail Shumilov)
  - 24th Guards Rifle Corps (major General A.J. Kruze)
    - 72nd Guards Rifle Division (Major General A.I. Loshev)
    - 81st Guards Rifle Division (Colonel M.A. Orlov)
    - 6th Guards Airborne Division (Major General Mikhail Smirnov)
  - 4th Guards Mechanized Corps (Lieutenant General Vladimir Zhdanov)
    - 14th Guards Mechanized Brigade (colonel N.A. Nikitin)
    - 36th Guards Tank Brigade (Colonel P.S. Zhukov)
  - 25th Guards Rifle Corps (Lieutenant General G.B. Safiulin)
    - 375th Rifle Division (Major General V.D. Karpukhin)
    - 409th Rifle Division (Major General J.P. Grechaniy)
    - 53rd Rifle Division (elements) (Colonel D.V. Vasilyevskiy)
    - 27th Separate Guards Tank Brigade (Colonel N.M Brizinev)
  - 93rd Guards Rifle Division (Colonel P.M Marol)

== Daily actions ==
=== Day 0: 16 February 1945 ===
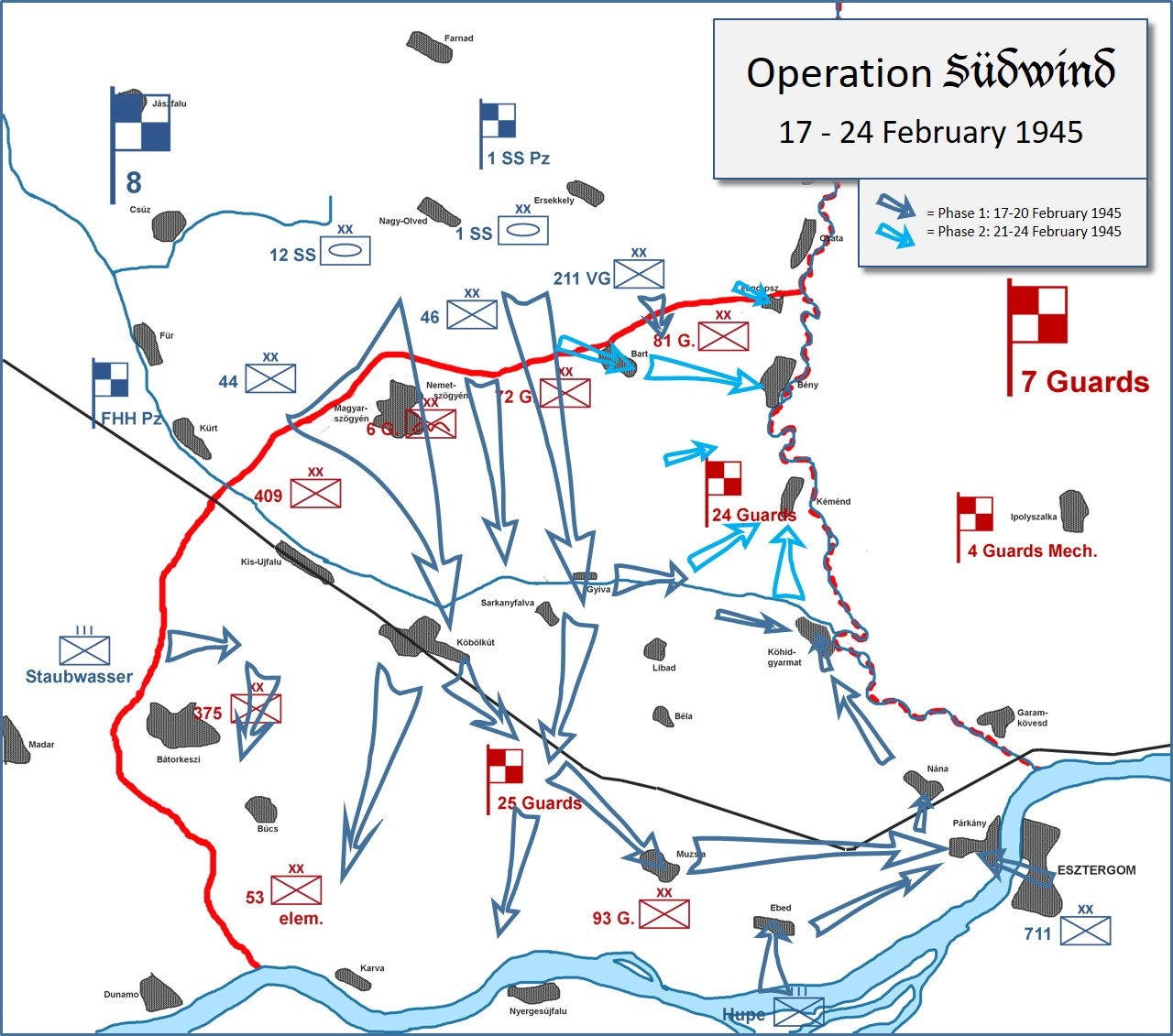
Overview of Operation Südwind, map showing initial positions of both German and Soviet forces, and the moves of the Germans in 2 phases until full elimination of the bridgehead.

The attack was preceded by a diversionary attack the day before. A reinforced regimental group of the 271. Volksgrenadier Division launched an attack northwest of Léva across the Hron.

=== Day 1: 17 February 1945 ===
Operation Südwind began at 04.00 hours at dawn on 17 February with a two-hour artillery preparation. The temperature was 5 °C, sky bright. The roads with solid surfaces were passable, the cart roads were passable for tracked vehicles, wheeled vehicles moved with considerable difficulties. The 44. Reichsgrenadier-Division "Hoch- und Deutschmeister" attacked the positions of Soviet forces in the sector around the villages of Für and Kürt against heavy resistance of 6th Guards Airborne Division. After initially suffering heavy casualties (mostly due to the deadly Soviet artillery), the Soviets were defeated in this sector thanks to strong support of the Tiger IIs of the Schwere Panzer Abteilung (sPzAbt) "Feldherrnhalle" and the division advanced toward the villages of Magyarszögyén en Németszögyén, and further reached the Párizs Canal late afternoon. The 46. Infanterie Division in the centre of the attack surprised the Soviet units and made good headway towards the Párizs Canal. The 211. Volksgrenadier Division attacked toward the village of Bart. The leading elements reached the valley southwest of Bart. Soviet resistance stiffened and finally the advance of the Division was stopped and held up by a surprise counterattack of the Soviets. The 1. SS-Panzer-Division closed up behind the assault formations of the 46. Infanterie Division. Soon the grenadiers were stopped southeast of Németszögyén at a reinforced anti-tank sector. Obersturmbannführer Peiper ordered 5 Tiger IIs to take position at the top of the hill. From there, although under heavy fire of the Soviet antitank guns, they neutralized these guns one after another without suffering losses. The SS-grenadiers of Kampfgruppe Hansen joined then and tanks plus halftracks firing with everything they had overrun the Soviet positions. Kampfgruppe Peiper and elements of the 46. Infanterie Division reached the Párizs Canal east of Sárkányfalva in the evening. The 12. SS-Panzer-Division launched its attack in the afternoon, on the right of the 1. SS-Panzer-Division, with SS-Panzergrenadier Regiment 25 on the right and SS-Panzergrenadier Regiment 26 on the left. At 21.00 h, I./26 succeeding in establishing a small bridgehead across the canal immediately southeast of Párizs-Puszta. Together with II./26 the bridgehead was enlarged. The Germans now occupied 2 small bridgeheads over the Párizs Canal and found a crossing point northeast of Köbölkút where the armoured fighting vehicles were also able to cross.

In the evening of 17 February, the Germans took advantage of the fact that the Soviets had ordered the 93rd Guards Rifle Division, until then in defense on the northern bank of the Danube, to launch a counterattack against the German forces that had broken through, and, thereby, weakened their defense in that area. Kampfgruppe Hupe (Oberstleutnant Hupe, commanding parts of 96. Infanterie-Division with fire support from Sturm-Artillerie-Brigade 239, with 20 StuG. IIIs and StuH. 42s) started crossing the Danube just south of Ebed on the northern bank.

=== Day 2: 18 February 1945 ===
Weather: mild frost at night, 6 °C during the day, slightly cloudy, sunny. The roads, however, remained unchanged. The German attack continued. Kampfgruppe Staubwasser, on the right flank of Panzerkorps Feldherrnhalle, occupied Óriás-Puszta ad advanced towards Bátorkeszi. The 44. Reichsgrenadier-Division "HuD" crossed the Canal at Kisújfalu and occupied Köbölkút. Together with sPzAbt. "Feldherrnhalle", Point 129 was taken. The 1. SS-Panzer-Division expanded its bridgeheads at Gyiva in the morning and at 12.50 h, armoured vehicles started crossing the canal, then the SS-Panzers rounded Béla from the left and dug in hedgehog style around the roads Köbölkút to Párkány. The 12. SS-Panzer-Division at dawn was hit by a Soviet counterattack, which was repulsed. Subsequently the SS-Regiments supported the 44. Reichsgrenadier-Division "HuD" with occupying Köbölkút. The 46. Infanterie Division headed east, with one column south of the Canal towards Libad and the other north of the Canal towards Kéménd. Despite support by parts of PzAbt 208, the 211. Volksgrenadier Division was not able to move further towards Bart and was even heavily attacked by the 36th Guards Tank Brigade, knocking out several panzers.

=== Day 3: 19 February 1945 ===
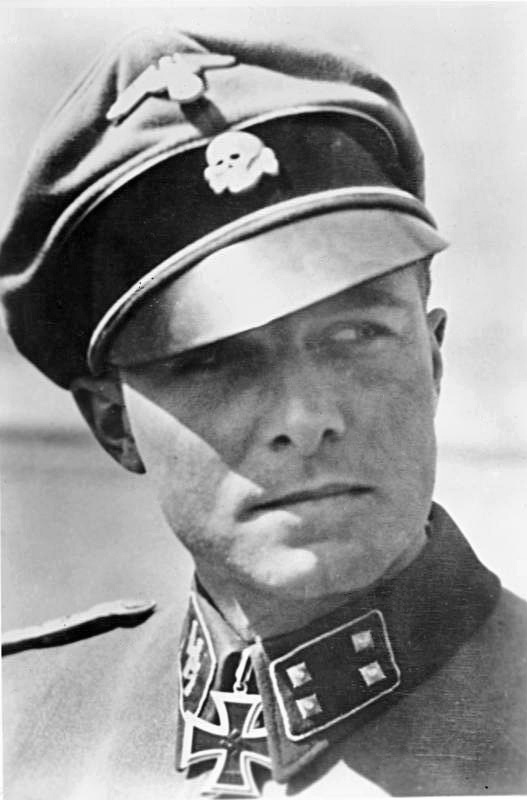
Commander of Kampfgruppe Peiper, Joachim Peiper (portraited as SS-Sturmbannführer in 1943)

Weather: frost at night, 6 °C during the day, generally bright and sunny. The cart tracks were drying up. On 19 February the situation of Soviet Forces in the south sector of the Soviet bridgehead was disastrous. In the early morning Kampfgruppe Staubwasser captured Búcs and Bátorkeszi and cleaned up this area of the remnants of Soviet forces. The 44. Reichsgrenadier-Division "HuD" was attacking toward south from the Köbölkút area towards the Danube River to clean up this area from the Soviet forces. Kampfgruppe Hupe was still fighting around Ebed and repulsed a Soviet counterattack at 0600 h. The 46. Infanterie Division seized the heights in the southeast from Libád in a perfect maneuver and gained observation on the Hron river. Panzer-Abteilung 208 attacked towards Kéménd, but got into troubles around Bibit-Puszta, lost most of its armour and played no further part in the operation. The 1. SS-Panzer-Division had a successful day. Kampfgruppe Hansen cleared Béla, while Kampfgruppe Peiper attacked towards Párkány. Despite problem with mines, attacking Soviet planes and T-34 tanks (all causing considerable losses), the Kampfgruppe reached the railway station of Párkány around 13.00 h. In the meantime, the 12. SS-Panzer-Division had advanced from south of Köbölkút to Muzsla, captured this village and advanced further towards Párkány arriving approximately at the same time as the assault guns of Kampfgruppe Hupe from Ebed. Additionally, a battle group from the 711. Infanterie Division crossed the Danube from Esztergom and forced their way into Párkány. Heavy urban fighting ensued, including tank-fighting. Párkány was taken. A battalion of SS-Panzergrenadier Regiment 2 attacked towards Nána and cleared the village. The troops of the completely smashed 25th Guards Rifle Corps fled to the east bank of the Hron, leaving the majority of their heavy weapons behind.

The situation was now fairly unclear to the Germans. Would the Soviets hold on to the rest of their bridgehead, would they reinforce it (aerial reconnaissance revealed 3600 motor vehicles moving north from Budapest) and what was the 6th Guards Tank Army doing (elements were identified already in the bridgehead)? In order to quickly clean up the situation west of the Hron, three Kampfgruppen attacked the southern portion of the bridgehead still during the night of 19 to 20 February. A Kampfgruppe of 1. SS-Panzer-Division attacked from the south towards Kőhídgyarmat and one from 46. Infanterie Division from the west. Gruppe Schöneich together with parts of the 46. Infanterie Division, attacked north of the Párizs canal toward Kéménd. None of the attacks were successful due to heavy resistance from 24th Guards Rifle Corps, artillery and planes.

=== Day 4: 20 February 1945 ===
Weather: frost at night, temperature 7 °C during the day, slightly cloudy, sunny, fog in certain areas. Unpaved roads passable only by night. This was a day of regrouping for the final attacks. The 12. SS-Panzer-Division was gradually relieved by the 44. Reichsgrenadier-Division "HuD" and set off the for their new assembly area northwest of Bart. Kampfgruppe Hupe was withdrawn to the Southbank of the Danube to its parent division.

=== Day 5: 21 February 1945 ===
Weather: frost at night, temperature 5 °C during the day, bright sky. The condition of the roads was constantly improving. At dawn, the 1. SS-Panzer-Division and 46. Infanterie Division pushed into the southern and western sectors of Kőhídgyarmat, suffering high losses, and captured the town only after fall of darkness around 21.00h. The remaining bridgehead was now 10 km wide and 4 km deep, defended by the four divisions (81st Guards Rifle Division, 72nd Guards Rifle Division, 6th Guards Airborne Division and 93rd Guards Rifle Division).

=== Day 6: 22 February 1945 ===
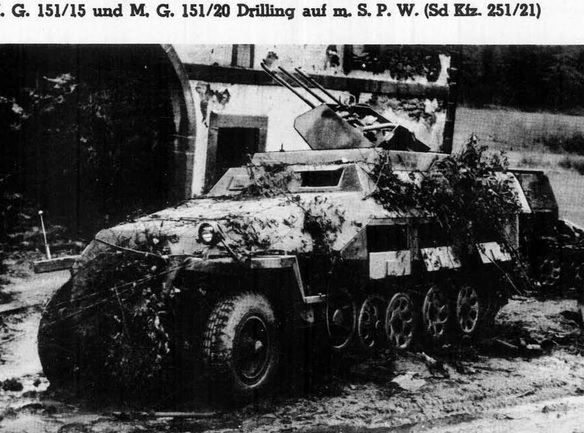
A Sdkfz 251/21 with Drilling MG151s as used in the attack on Bart

Weather: frost at night, temperature 6 °C during the day. Alternating sunny and cloudy periods, little rain. The roads were drying up.

Now the Soviets put up extremely heavy resistance in their remaining bridgehead. The 1. SS-Panzer-Division and 46. Infanterie Division were cleaning in and around Kőhídgyarmat, and a SS-Kampfgruppe occupied the road junction between Kéménd and Kőhídgyarmat on the bank of the Párizs Canal. The 46. Infanterie Division, reinforced by Gruppe Schöneich occupied Bibit-Puszta and even pushed 1 km further, but in the evening the Soviets counterattacked and regained the area. The 12. SS-Panzer-Division started at 04.45 h with its attack on Bart, with the two SS-Panzergrenadier Regiments abreast, followed by the Panzers. Heavy fighting took place, but a dashing advance of the halftracks (especially thanks to firepower of the single and triple barreled 2 cm guns in a part of them) got the grenadiers into the town. Some T-34s were putting up resistance, but when the Soviet tankers were abandoned by their infantry, they departed toward Bény. Still some counterattacks were carried out, but could be repulsed. Elements from the 211. Volksgrenadier Division attacked Bart from the south. In the course of the morning, the village was completely cleared. During the day, the 6. SS-Panzerarmee requested to withdraw its armored units from the bridgehead, but this was rejected by Heeresgruppe Süd. This day recorded also one of the few successes of the Luftwaffe in the air. An “ace”, Hauptmann Helmut Lipfert, was just appointed as Gruppenkommandeur (group commander) of I./JG 53, based at Veszprém, on 15 February 1945. On the 22nd he scored his 180th and 181st victories in his Bf 109G, resp. a La-5 over Bart and a Yak-3 over Bíňa.

=== Day 7: 23 February 1945 ===
Weather: frost at night, temperature 6°C during the day, cloudy, around noon the clouds parted. The road conditions did not improve. The day was completely used for regrouping and preparing for the final blow. A night attack would give the best chances of success. The attack was set for 02.00 h.

=== Day 8: 24 February 1945 ===
Weather: frost at night, temperature 6°C during the day, thick layers of clouds, rain in certain places. The unpaved roads and the open terrain were muddy and hardly passable even for the tracked vehicles because of the sudden melting. In the perimeter of Kéménd, the Soviets constructed a deeply echeloned defensive system which included a pakfront with thirty-seven heavy anti-tank guns. Together with a Kampfgruppe of the 44. Reichsgrenadier-Division "HuD", the 1. SS-Panzer-Division broke through the pakfront after fierce fighting and forced a penetration into the town. House-to-house combat erupted in Kéménd, which did not end until late that afternoon with the final capture of the town. The bridge at Kéménd was destroyed by the Soviets to prevent the Germans from capturing it. The remnants of the Soviets troops crossed through the ice and the ford to the eastern bank of the Hron. Their artilleries put down heavy harassing fire during the whole day from the eastern bank, concentrating on the area of Kéménd and Bény, without regard for their own retreating troops, in order to impede the attempts of the Germans to cross. The attack at Bény was carried out by SS-Panzergrenadier Regiment 26 of the 12. SS-Panzer-Division, supported by II. Panzerabteilung. The attack went swift and at 08.30 the town was under control and cleared around noon. The bridge at Bény was blown up while the SS-Panzergrenadiers were approaching. The 211. Volksgrenadier Division took advantage of the success at Bény and captured Leand-Puszta in the course of the morning.

The German 8. Armee send a report to Heeresgruppe Süd at 17.20 h, reporting the complete elimination of the bridgehead. This report was forwarded to OKH at 17.45 h. Operation Südwind had ended.

== Conclusion ==
Operation Südwind had gone according to plan. It was one of the last successful German offensives in the Second World War. The Soviet bridgehead and threat were completely eliminated. According to Soviet data, the 7th Guards Army lost 8194 soldiers, 54 destroyed tanks and self-propelled guns, and 459 other guns. Battle casualties of the Germans were also high. This was, in part, due to the fact that it was not the armoured fighting vehicles, but the (Panzer)Grenadiers that bore the brunt of the fighting. Losses in men were 6471 (969 dead, 4601 wounded and 901 MIA). Material losses were approximately 130 Panzers and Jagdpanzers, although a majority was repairable. A good example are the Tiger IIs in both sPzAbt-en. At the start on 17 February, there were 44 operational. On 20 February there were 13 operational and only 7 operational after hostilities ended. Of these "missing" 37, only one was a total-loss and 2 had to be sent back to Germany for factory repair, although the missing ones would have been classed as knocked-out using the Soviet method of assessing losses. Although the operation itself was a success, the downside was that the Soviets became aware of the presence of I. SS Panzerkorps in Hungary well in time before Operation Spring Awakening. This was something the Germans did try to mask as much as possible before. This gave the Soviets ample time to strengthen their defenses for the coming offensive.
