= 510th Heavy Panzer Battalion =

- Active: 6. June 1944- 8. May 1945
- Country: Nazi Germany
- Branch: Army
- Type: Panzer
- Size: Battalion
- Equipment: Tiger I (1944–45); Tiger II (1945)

Insignia
- Identification symbol

The 510th Heavy Panzer Battalion (German: "schwere Panzerabteilung 510"; abbreviated: "s PzAbt 510") was a German heavy Panzer Abteilung (an independent battalion-sized unit), equipped with heavy tanks. The 510th saw action on the Eastern Front during the Second World War.

== History ==
The 510th was formed June 1944; in July it was sent to Lithuania, where it fought in the Courland Pocket until the end of the war, attached to the 14th Panzer Division. Elements of the battalion were evacuated from Courland and transferred to the Western Front, where they subsequently surrendered to the Western Allies. A battle group with the last 15 Tiger tanks was left behind in Courland, where it surrendered to the Red Army.

== See also ==
- German heavy tank battalion
- Organisation of a SS Panzer Division
- Panzer Division

== Bibliography ==
- Jentz, Thomas (1996). Panzertruppen 2: The Complete Guide to the Creation & Combat Employment of Germany's Tank Force 1943-1945. Schiffer. ISBN 978-0-7643-0080-6.
- Schneider, Wolfgang (2004) [2000]. Tigers in Combat. Vol. I. Stackpole Books. ISBN 0-8117-3171-5.
- Wilbeck, Christopher W. (2004). Sledgehammers: Strengths and Flaws of Tiger Tank Battalions in World War II. Aberjona Press. ISBN 0-9717650-2-2.
