= Hannibal von Lüttichau =

Hannibal Siegfried Wolff Curt von Lüttichau
- Born: 2 February 1915; Dresden
- Died: 25 January 2002 (aged 86); Bonn
- Military career
- Allegiance: Nazi Germany
- Branch: German Army
- Service years: 1934–1945
- Rank: Major
- Commands: 509th Heavy Panzer Battalion
- Conflicts: World War II
- Awards: Knight's Cross of the Iron Cross

Hannibal Siegfried Wolff Curt von Lüttichau (2 February 1915 – 25 January 2002) was officer in the Wehrmacht of Nazi Germany during World War II and a recipient of the Knight's Cross of the Iron Cross. He was a member of the Lüttichau noble family.

In the final weeks of the war, an SS division moved into the Tegernsee valley and built defenses against the American forces advancing from Bad Tölz. On May 3, 1945, as American artillery prepared to open fire on the town, a wounded officer in the German army, Maj. Hannibal von Lüttichau, who was recovering in the makeshift military hospital, persuaded the SS to withdraw in order to save the town and its large population of noncombatants from the imminent bombardment. After persuading the SS to withdraw from the town, the Major advanced unarmed, in uniform, and alone towards the American forces under a white flag and convinced the commanding officer to spare the town.

Post-war he became President of the German Castles Association from 1971 to 1986 and received the Federal Cross of Merit.

== Awards and decorations ==
- Knight's Cross of the Iron Cross on 16 January 1945 as Hauptmann and commander of II./Panzer-Regiment 2
- Knight of Justice of the Order of Saint John (Bailiwick of Brandenburg)

Military offices
Preceded by None	Commander of schwere-Panzer-Abteilung 509; May 1943 – October 1943	Succeeded by Major Gierka
