= 102nd SS Heavy Panzer Battalion =

SS Panzer Battalion

- schwere SS-Panzerabteilung 102
- Active: July 1943
- Country: Nazi Germany
- Branch: Waffen-SS
- Type: Panzer
- Role: Armoured warfare
- Size: Battalion, up to 45 Panzer
- Equipment: Tiger I Panzer
- Engagements: Battle of Normandy; Battle of Verrieres Ridge; Operation Totalize; Operation Tractable; Falaise Pocket

The 102nd Heavy SS Panzer Battalion (German: schwere SS-Panzerabteilung 102) was a German heavy tank battalion of the Waffen-SS during World War II. It fought as part of the II SS Panzer Corps during the Battle of Normandy and was nearly destroyed. Renumbered as 502nd Heavy SS Panzer Battalion in late 1944, the unit was destroyed in the Halbe Pocket in Spring 1945.

== Operational history ==
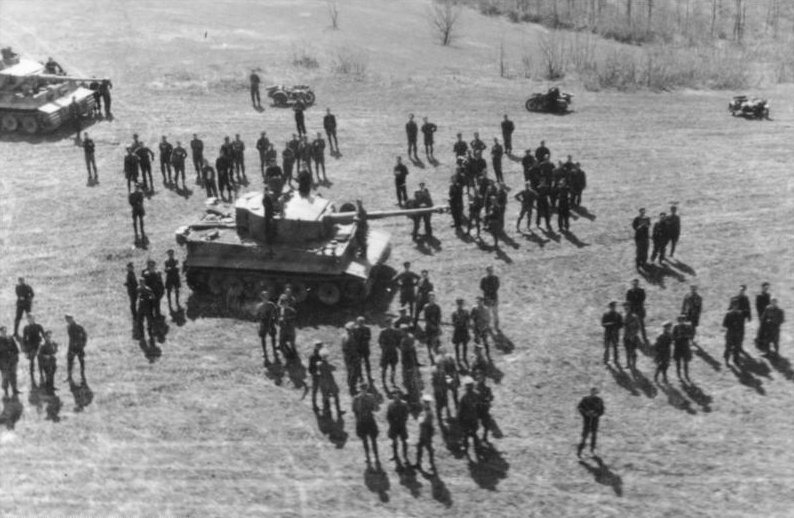
Heinrich Himmler inspecting tanks of the battalion, Soviet Union, 1943

In April 1943, the Waffen-SS ordered the creation of a series of heavy tank battalions equipped with the new Tiger I tanks — for use in offensive actions on the Eastern Front. Each of the heavy tank battalions would be attached to a Corps of the Waffen SS. Upon formation, the 102nd was attached to the II SS Panzer Corps. Originally, each heavy tank battalion was composed of a single company of Tiger I's, attached to each respective SS Panzer Division in the Panzerkorps. By July 1943, the predecessor of the 102nd — SS Panzer Regiment 2 of the SS Division Das Reich — was equipped with 14 Tiger I's.

The battalion was sent to Normandy after the Allied D Day landings. The battalion was almost completely destroyed during the fighting in Normandy; in September 1944 it was pulled back to Germany to reform. Stationed in Sennelager the battalion was renumbered the 502nd Heavy SS Panzer Battalion on September 9, 1944. Equipped with Tiger II tanks, the battalion took part in the defense against the Red Army at the Oder front. During the Battle of Berlin, the battalion was encircled in the Halbe Pocket in 1945 and destroyed.

== See also ==
- Panzer division
