= German heavy tank battalion =

Battalion-sized World War II tank unit of the German Army

German schwere Panzabteilung 1943 ( s PzAbt )
- (US Army map symbol: Panzer battalion)
- Active: 1943
- Country: Germany
- Branch: German Heer
- Type: Panzer
- Role: Armoured warfare
- Size: Battalion, up to 45 tanks
- Part of: Wehrmacht
- Engagements: World War II

A German heavy tank battalion (German: "schwere Panzerabteilung", short: "s PzAbt") was a battalion-sized World War II tank unit of the German Army during World War II, equipped with Tiger I, and later Tiger II, heavy tanks. Originally intended to fight on the offensive during breakthrough operations, the German late-war realities required it to be used in a defensive posture by providing heavy fire support and counter-attacking enemy armored breakthroughs, often organised into ad hoc Kampfgruppen (battlegroups).

The German heavy tank battalions destroyed a total of 8,100 enemy tanks for the loss of 1,482 of their own, an overall kill/loss ratio of 5.47 though individual unit ratios ranged from 1.28 to 13. The German losses also include non-combat tank write-offs.

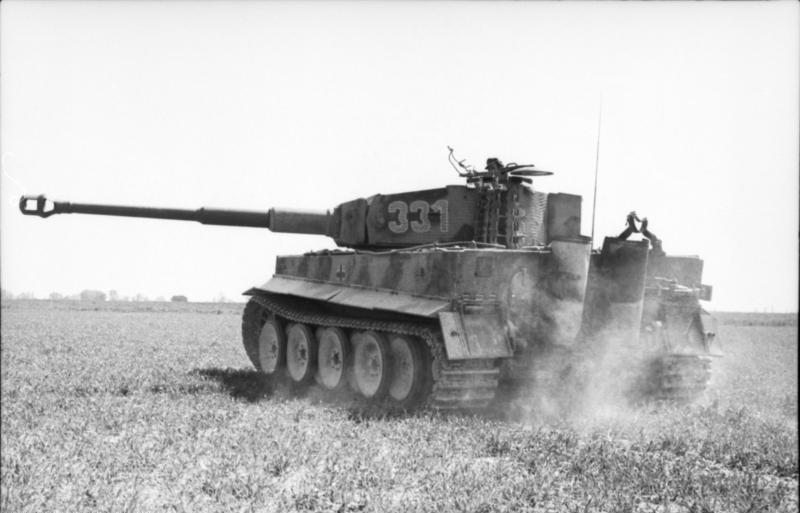
Tiger I in France.

== Formation ==
Early formation units experimented to find the correct combination of heavy Tiger tanks supported by either medium Panzer III tanks or reconnaissance elements. In 1942 this consisted of 20 Tigers and 16 Panzer IIIs, composed of two companies, each with four platoons of two Tigers and two Panzer IIIs. Each company commander would have an additional Tiger, and battalion command would have another two.

Later formations had a standard organization of 45 Tiger Tanks, composed of three companies of 14 Tigers each, plus three command vehicles. Maintenance troubles and the mechanical unreliability of the Tigers posed a continuous problem, so often the units would field a smaller number of combat-ready tanks.

The limited number of these heavy tanks, plus their specialized role in either offensive or defensive missions, meant they were rarely permanently assigned to a single division or corps, but shuffled around according to war circumstances.

In addition to tanks, each battalion planned to include the following

| Vehicle | vehicle type | 1 July 1943 | 1 January 1945 |
|---|---|---|---|
| Flakpanzer IV | Self-propelled anti-aircraft gun | 0 | 8 |
| Sd.Kfz. 7/1 8 ton 4 x 2 cm Flak | Self-propelled anti-aircraft gun | 6 | 3 |
| Sd.Kfz. 251 Schützenpanzerwagen | Armoured half-track | 10 | 11 |
| Bergepanther | Armoured recovery vehicle | 0 | 5 |
| Sd.Kfz. 9 18 ton Zugkraftwagen | Half-track prime mover | 8 | 7 |
| Sd.Kfz. 10 1 ton Zugkraftwagen | Light half-track | 8 | 13 |
| Sd.Kfz. 2 Kettenkrad | Gun tractor | 0 | 14 |
| Beiwagenkrad | Motorcycle with sidecar, e.g. BMW R75 | 25 | 0 |
| Solokrad | Motorcycle | 17 | 6 |
| Kübelwagen Personenkraftwagen | Staff car | 64 | 38 |
| Personenkraftwagen, zivil | Civilian car | 2 | 1 |
| Lastkraftwagen | Truck, e.g. Opel Blitz | 111 | 84 |
| Lastkraftwagen, zivil | Civilian truck | 24 | 34 |
| Maultier | Half-track truck | 0 | 6 |
| Kran-Kraftfahrzeug | Mobile crane | 3 | 3 |
| Total | | 278 | 233 |

=== Organisation structure ===
The organisation structure of a German heavy Panzer battalion in 1943, in this case the schwere Panzerabteilung 508, was as follows.

- staff / German: Stab
- staff company of three tanks ( Stabskompanie )
  - communications platoon / Nachrichtenzug
  - armoured reconnaissance platoon (on IFV) / gepanzerter Aufklärungszug
  - area reconnaissance platoon / Erkundungszug (ErkdZug)
  - engineer platoon ( Pionierzug (PiZug)
  - anti-aircraft platoon ( Fliegerabwehrzug (FlakZug)
- 1st – 3rd Panzer company (14 tanks each) / 1. – 3. Panzerkompanie
  - company detachment (two tanks) ( Kompanietrupp )
  - 1st – 3rd panzer platoon, each of four tanks each ( 1. – 3. Panzerzug )
  - medical service( Sanitätsdienst )
  - vehicle repair detachment ( Kfz. Instandsetzungstrupp )
  - combat train I ( Gefechtstross I )
  - combat train II ( Gefechtstross II )
  - baggage train / Gepäcktross
- workshop company ( Werkstattkompanie )
  - 1st and 2nd workshop platoon (1. and 2. Werkstattzug )
  - recovery platoon / Bergezug
  - armourer detachment ( Waffenmeisterei )
  - communications detachment ( Funkmeisterei )
  - spare part detachment ( Ersatzteiltrupp )

== Army units ==
By the end of the war, the following heavy panzer detachments had been created. Early units were re-built several times by the end of the war.

Independent units within the German Army (Heer) were:

- 501st Heavy Panzer Battalion - original unit surrendered in Tunisia campaign, reformed and destroyed on Eastern Front
- 502nd Heavy Panzer Battalion - redesignated 511th on 5 January 1945
- 503rd Heavy Panzer Battalion - largely destroyed in Normandy, refitted and deployed on Eastern Front
- 504th Heavy Panzer Battalion
- 505th Heavy Panzer Battalion
- 506th Heavy Panzer Battalion
- 507th Heavy Panzer Battalion
- 508th Heavy Panzer Battalion
- 509th Heavy Panzer Battalion
- 510th Heavy Panzer Battalion
- 511th Heavy Panzer Battalion
- 301st Heavy Panzer Battalion (radio control)

== SS units ==
Waffen-SS units were

- 101st SS Heavy Panzer Battalion largely destroyed by end of the battle of Normandy, withdrawn and refitted with Tiger II and renamed as SS Heavy Panzer Battalion 501 (German: schwere SS-Panzerabteilung 501), part of I SS Panzer Corps in September 1944.
- 102nd SS Heavy Panzer Battalion largely destroyed in battle of Normandy, refitted and renamed in September 1944, as SS Heavy Panzer Battalion 502 (schwere SS-Panzerabteilung 502), part of II SS Panzer Corps
- 103rd SS Heavy Panzer Battalion renamed in 1944, as SS Heavy Panzer Battalion 503 (schwere SS-Panzerabteilung 503), part of III (Germanic) SS Panzer Corps
- 104th SS Heavy Panzer Battalion (schwere SS-Panzerabteilung 104) was planned 22 October 1943, for IV SS Panzer Corps, but was never formed

== Combat performance ==
Kill and losses of heavy tank battalions (1942–1945):
| Unit | Losses | Destroyed | Ratio |
|---|---|---|---|
| 501st Heavy Panzer Battalion | 120 | 450 | 3.75 |
| 502nd Heavy Panzer Battalion | 107 | 1,400 | 13.08 |
| 503rd Heavy Panzer Battalion | 252 | 1,700 | 6.75 |
| 504th Heavy Panzer Battalion | 109 | 250 | 2.29 |
| 505th Heavy Panzer Battalion | 126 | 900 | 7.14 |
| 506th Heavy Panzer Battalion | 179 | 400 | 2.23 |
| 507th Heavy Panzer Battalion | 104 | 600 | 5.77 |
| 508th Heavy Panzer Battalion | 78 | 100 | 1.28 |
| 509th Heavy Panzer Battalion | 120 | 500 | 4.17 |
| 510th Heavy Panzer Battalion | 65 | 200 | 3.08 |
| 13./Panzer-Regiment Großdeutschland | 6 | 100 | 16.67 |
| III./Panzer-Regiment Großdeutschland | 98 | 500 | 5.10 |
| 13./SS-Panzer-Regiment 1 | 42 | 400 | 9.52 |
| 8./SS-Panzer-Regiment 2 | 31 | 250 | 8.06 |
| 9./SS-Panzer-Regiment 3 | 56 | 500 | 8.93 |
| 101st SS Heavy Panzer Battalion | 107 | 500 | 4.67 |
| 102nd SS Heavy Panzer Battalion | 76 | 600 | 7.89 |
| 103rd SS Heavy Panzer Battalion | 39 | 500 | 12.82 |
| Total: | 1,715 | 9,850 | 5.74 |

Tank losses include losses inflicted other than by enemy tanks. Also, many tanks were abandoned by their crews due to a lack of fuel, ammunition or breakdown, especially at the end of war.

== See also ==
- Organisation of a SS Panzer Division
- Panzer Division
