= 510 Squadron =

510 Squadron or 510th Squadron may refer to:

- No. 510 Squadron RAF, United Kingdom
- 510th Bombardment Squadron, United States
- 510th Fighter Squadron, United States
- 510th Missile Squadron, United States
