= SS Panzer Division order of battle =

SS Panzer Division
- SS-Panzerdivision (1943); SS-PzDiv
- Active: 1943
- Country: Germany
- Branch: (Schutzstaffel) Waffen-SS
- Type: Panzer
- Role: Armoured warfare
- Size: Division, up to 20,000 soldiers
- Part of: Waffen-SS
- Engagements: World War II

An SS Panzer Division (German: SS-Panzerdivision, short: SS-PzDiv) was a Waffen-SS formation during World War II. The ogranization shown below is the order of battle to which an SS panzer division aspired.

The average complement of a SS Panzerdivision was approximately 19,000. However, only two out of seven SS panzer divisions contained that strength. In the second half of the war in Europe, in particular close to the end of war, some divisions achieved only the complement of regiment sized units. A Werfer (rocket) Battailon was only part of the 1st SS Panzer Division Leibstandarte Adolf Hitler and the 12th SS Panzer Division "Hitlerjugend" until they were made independent in the second half of 1944.

An SS Panzer division consisted of a panzer (tank) regiment, two panzergrenadier regiments of mechanized infantry and an artillery regiment together with supporting units. Each panzergrenadier regiment contained three battalions making it roughly the size of a brigade in the Allied armiies

== Organisation ==
Division headquarters (Divisionsstab) was made up of

- Divisionskommandeur (abbreviated DivKdr) - the commander of the division
- Generalstabsoffizier, general staff officer
- Kartographieeinheit, mapping unit
- Fernmeldeeinheit, the communications unit
- Divisionsbegleitschutz, Division escort
- Militärpolizei - military police (the SS-Feldgendarmie)

Quartiermeister (Qu) - quartermaster, administrating supplies and equipment

- Waffenzug - Weapon platoon
- Mechaniker - Mechanical
- Stabsarzt - Captain Dr physician
- Stabszahnarzt - Captain Dr dentist

Panzeraufklärungsabteilung (PzAufklAbt) - "armoured reconnaisance battalion"

- 2 Panzerspähkompanien ("armoured scout company") - equipped with amoured cars
- 2 Panzeraufklärungskompanien ("armoured reconnaissance companies")
- 1 schwere Kompanie - "heavy company"

Panzerregiment (PzRgt) - tank regiment of three battalions

- I. Abteilung (1st battalion)
  - 4 Kompanien (companies numbered 1–4)
  - Werkstattkompanie - workshop company
- II. Abteilung
  - 5 Kompanien (5–9)
  - Werkstattzug - workshop platoon
- Panzerjägerabteilung (PzJgAbt) - Anti-tank battalion
  - 3 Kompanien von Sturmgeschützen (numbered 1–3) with assault guns

Flag of the commander of Panzergrenadierregiment 40 (Panzergrenadier regiment 40)

Two Panzergrenadierregiment (PzGrenRgt) each of three battalions:

- I. Bataillon
  - 4 companies (Kompanien) numbered 1–4
- II. Bataillon
  - 4 companies (numbered 5–8)
- III. Bataillon
  - 4 companies (numbered 9–12)
  - Schwere Infanteriegeschützkompanie (13) - heavy infantry gun company
  - Flakkompanie (14) - Anti-aircraft gun company
  - Aufklärungskompanie (15) - Reconnaissance company
  - Pionierkompanie (16) - Engineer company

Panzerartillerieregiment (PzArtRgt)

- I. Abteilung - 3 batteries
- II. Abteilung - 3 Batterien
- III Abteilung - 4 batteries

Rocket launcher battalion (Werferabteilung )

- 4 Batterien (1–4) - with Nebelwerfer

Anti-aircraft battalion (Flakabteilung, FlakAbt)

- 5 batteries (1–5)

Support units
Armoured engineer battalion	Panzerpionierabteilung (PzPiAbt)
1 (armoured) company - in armoured personnel carriers; 3 engineer companies; Bridge convoy B	1 (gepanzerte) Kompanie (auf SPw); 3 Pionierkompanien; Brückenkolonne B
Armoured signals battalion	Panzernachrichtenabteilung
1 communications company; 1 radio company	1 Fernmeldekompanie; 1 Funkkompanie
Divisional supply troops	Divisions-Nachschubtruppe
6 vehicle companies; 1 supply company	6 Kraftfahrkompanien; 1 Nachschubkompanie
Panzer maintenance battalion	Panzer-Instandsetzungsabteilung
3 workshop companies; 1 (weapon) workshop company; 1 spare and repair part company	3 Werkstattkompanien; 1 (Waffen-) Werkstattkompanie; 1 Ersatzteilkompanie
Provisioning battalion	Wirtschaftsbataillon
Bakery company; Butcher company; Divisional food services office; Military post office	Bäckereikompanie; Schlächtereikompanie; Divisions-Verpflegungsamt; Feldpostamt
Medical battalion	Sanitätsabteilung
2 medical companies; 1 ambulance company; 1 medical supply company	2 Sanitätskompanien; 1 Krankenkraftwagekompanie; 1 Versorgungskompanie

Feldersatzbataillon ("Replacement battalion")

Each division had a training battalion attached. The battalion included the permanent training staff and took in soldiers sent to the division for training before combat.

== See also ==
- German heavy tank battalion German: "schwere Panzerabteilung"
- Panzer division
- List of Waffen-SS divisions
