= Abteilung =

German word for German or Swiss military formations

Abteilung ([apˈtaɪ̯lʊŋ]; abbrv. Abt.) is a German word that is often used for German or Swiss military formations and depending on its usage could mean detachment, department or battalion; it can also refer to a military division. In German, it is used both for military and civilian departments (as in "office department").

In the military of the German Empire, the Weimar Republic and the Wehrmacht (during World War II), the term Abteilung was generally a battalion equivalent in the armoured, cavalry, reconnaissance and artillery arms of the Wehrmacht and Waffen-SS. For example, Schwere Panzerabteilung refers to German heavy tank battalions. However, when the term was used for large military formations, it generally meant "detachment". For example, Armee-Abteilung translates to "army detachment" and Korpsabteilung to "corps detachment". The German term Abteilung is used in the same sense as the Russian term divizion (дивизион) or the Polish term dywizjon.

== Abteilung in the East German military ==
Both terms are used most often for artillery battalion (field, air defence, coastal) or a flotilla of ships and this was also used in the National People's Army (East Germany's military).

=== Ground Forces ===
Examples of the various types of Abteilungen in the East German ground forces are found in the 11. Motorisierte Schützendivision (11th Motor Rifle Division) and the 7. Panzerdivision (7th Tank Division).

The 11. Motorisierte Schützendivision (based in Halle/Saale) consisted of the 16th, 17th and 18th Motor Rifle Regiments, the 11th Tank Regiment, the 11th Artillery Regiment and various combat and service support units. Each MRR had an organic Artillerieabteilung, designated by its mother-regiment, like the Artillerieabteilung/MSR-16 (the field artillery battalion of the 16th MRR). Each Artillerieabteilung of an MRR consisted of 3 artillery batteries (in this example the 1., 2. and the 3. Artilleriebatterie/AA/MSR-16 (1st, 2nd and 3rd Artillery Battery) of 6 2S1 Gvozdika self-propelled howitzers each, although in some cases the 3rd Battery could be downgraded to a wartime mobilization unit. The Artillerieregiment 11 "Wilhelm Koenen" based in Wolfen consisted of the I. and the II. Artillerieabteilung/AR-11 of 3 artillery batteries (2 active, 1 wartime mobilization) of 6 D-30 towed howitzers each and the III. Artillerieabteilung/AR-11 of 3 artillery batteries (all active) of 6 2S3 Akatsiya self-propelled howitzers each. The division also had a ballistic missile, a multiple rocket launch and an anti-tank Abteilungen. The Raketenabteilung 11 "Magnus Poser" (ballistic missile battalion) based in Tautenhain included the 1. and the 2. Raketenbatterie/RA-11 of two 2K6 Luna (NATO reporting name FROG) ballistic missile launch vehicles each. The Geschosswerferabteilung 11 "Hermann Falke" (MRLS battalion) based in Wolfen included the 1., 2. and 3. Geschosswerferbatterie/GeWA-11 of 6 RM-70 multiple rocket launcher vehicles each. The Panzerjägerabteilung 11 "Hermann Vogt" (ATGM battalion) based in Halle included the 1. Panzerjägerbatterie/PJA-11 of 9 ATGM Konkurs launchers and the 2. and 3. Panzerjägerbatterie/PJA-11 (1./PJA-11) of 6 MT-12 anti-tank guns each.

The 7. Panzerdivision (based in Dresden) consisted of the 14th, 15th and 16th Tank Regiments, the 7th Motor Rifle Regiment, the 7th Artillery Regiment and various combat and service support units. The tank regiments did not have organic field artillery. The motor rifle regiment had the Artillerieabteilung / MSR-7 (artillery battalion of 7th MRR), consisting of the 1., 2. and the 3. Artilleriebatterie/AA/MSR-7 of 6 2S1 howitzers each. At division level the 7th Artillery Regiment consisted of the I., II. and the III. Artillerieabteilung/AR-7 also of 3 artillery batteries of 6 2S1 howitzers each, with a fourth 2S1 Abteilung - the IV. Artillerieabteilung/AR-7 to mobilize in wartime. The V. Artillerieabteilung/AR-7 was also active in peacetime with 3 artillery batteries of 6 2S3 each. Also part of the division were the separate Raketenabteilung 7 "Alfred Kurella" (7th Ballistic Missile Battalion) based in Zeithain and including the 1. and the 2. Raketenbatterie/RA-7 (1./RA-7) of 2 OTR-21 Tochka missile launch vehicles each and the Geschosswerferabteilung 7 "Ernst Schneller" (7th Multiple Rocket Launcher Battalion) in Frankenberg/Saale, consisting of the 1., 2. and the 3. Geschosswerferbatterie/GeWA-7 (MLRS batteries) of 6 RM-70 each. Each East German army division also had two separate medical battalions (sing. Selbständige Medizinische Abteilung) mobilized in wartime.

At the district level the two military districts Militärbezirk III and Militärbezirk V each had various artillery units. Each MD had a complex artillery reconnaissance Abteilung - the Artillerieaufklärungsabteilung-3 and the Artillerieaufklärungsabteilung-5 of one optical reconnaissance, one radar measurement, one radio measurement and one meteorological observation battery, both Abteilungen to expand into regiments in wartime. Each MD also had a Geschosswerferabteilung (MRL battalion) and a Panzerjägerabteilung (AT battalion) also to expand into regiments in wartime. An artillery regiment of several Artillerieabteilungen under each MD was to expand into an artillery brigade in wartime. Each military district also had a ballistic missile brigade as the case with the Militärbezirk V's 5. Raketenbrigade "Bruno Leuschner" based in Demen. The 5. RBr included the I. and the II. Raketenabteilung/5. RBr (I. RA/5. RBr) with two launch batteries of 2 R-300 ballistic missile launchers (NATO reporting name Scud) each and the III. Raketenabteilung/5. RBr (III. RA/5. RBr) with two launch batteries of 2 R-400 Oka (NATO reporting name Spider) each. Each military district also had an air defence missile regiment like the 3rd MD's Fliegerabwehrraketenregiment 3 "Kurt Kresse" based in Hohenmölsen. The regiment included the I. and the II. Fliegerabwehrraketenabteilung/FRR-3 with 5 air defence missile batteries of 4 2K11 Krug missile launchers between the two Abteilungen. The divisions also had their own air defence missile regiments, but they did not have Abteilungen, instead they consisted of directly reporting air defence missile batteries.

=== Air Force ===
The East German Air Force and Air Defence also had Fliegerabwehrraketenregimenter (air defence missile regiments) consisting of air defence missile Abteilungen.

=== Navy ===
In the East German People's Navy the Küstenraketenregiment 18 "Waldemar Verner" (18th Coastal Missile Regiment) based in Rövershagen had a peacetime composition of the I. and the II. Küstenraketenabteilung (coastal missile battalions) and the 1. Fliegerabwehrbatterie (air defence artillery battery), adding the III. Küstenraketenabteilung and the 2. Fliegerabwehrbatterie in wartime. Each Küstenraketenabteilung had 2 Startbatterien (launch batteries) of two 4K51 Rubezh (NATO codename SSC-3 Styx) missile launch vehicles each.

In the fleet of the Volksmarine a Flottille - the equivalent of an army division consisted of brigades of ships, which were made up of Abteilungen of ship. For example, the 4. Sicherungsbrigade (4th Security [Coastal Defence] Brigade) of the 4. Flottille, based in the Hohe Düne Naval Station in Rostock - Warnemünde consisted of the 2. and 4. Küstenschutzschiffsabteilungen of 4 Parchim-class corvettes each and the 2. and 4. Minenabwehrschiffsabteilung of 6 Kondor-II class minesweepers each. The landing ships of the 1. Flottille were grouped into the 1. Landungsschiffsbrigade (1st Landing Ships Brigade), based at Peenemünde Naval Station and consisting of the 1. and 3. Landungsschiffsabteilung of 6 Frosch-I landing ships each.

== Abteilung in the Bundeswehr ==
The Bundeswehr did not reintroduce the Abteilung term for field and naval formations, using it only to denote staff, research and education departments. The artillery uses the term Bataillon (battalion) and the navy uses Gruppe (group) for groupings of small ships of fast attack craft or landing boat size.

== See also ==
- Aufklärungsabteilung
- Korpsabteilung
- Sonderabteilung
- Sturmabteilung - The Nazi "SA" or "Brownshirts"
- Schwere Panzerabteilung
