= Ader (disambiguation) =

Ader is a French automobile.

Ader may also refer to:

- Ader (surname)
- Ader Tower, historical monument in Buenos Aires
- Mount Ader, mountain in Antarctica
