= Ader (surname) =

Ader is a German, Hungarian and Jewish surname derived from the ancient Germanic personal name Adheri ("nobility" + "army") or the Middle High German word ader ("vein," used for barber-surgeons) Notable people with the surname include:

- Alfred Ader (1892–1941), Polish fencer
- Bas Jan Ader (1942–1975), Dutch conceptual artist
- Clément Ader (1841–1925), French flight pioneer
- Robert Ader (1932–2011), American psychologist and academic
- Tammy Ader (born 1962), American television writer, director and producer
- Walt Ader (1913–1982), American racecar driver
- János Áder (born 1959), President of Hungary
- Jean-Joseph Ader (born 1796), French playwright, writer and historian
- Reinhard Ader (born 1949), German painter

== See also ==
- Adèr
- Erwin Aders
