= Adèr =

Adèr is a surname. Notable people with the surname include:

- Guilhèm Adèr (1567?–1638), Occitan language writer
- Herman J. Adèr (born 1940), Dutch statistician/methodologist and consultant

== See also ==
- Ader (surname)
