= Moto-Cardan =

Early 20th century motorcycle built in France

The Moto-Cardan was a V-twin engined motorcycle built by the Ader company in France in 1903. The Moto-Cardan was one of the first motorcycles to feature a Cardan drive shaft which delivered torque and rotation to the rear wheel, instead of a chain drive.
