= Tiger I =

German WWII heavy tank

Panzerkampfwagen VI Tiger Ausf. E
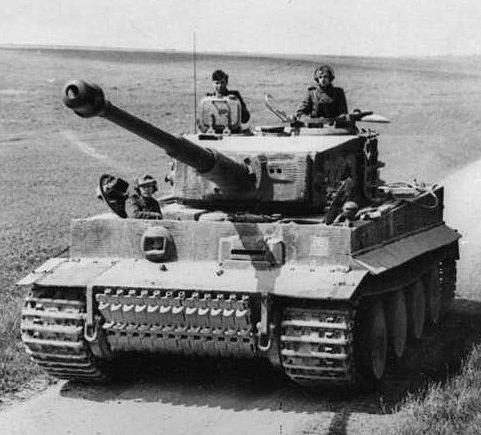
- Tiger I in northern France, March 1944
- Type: Heavy tank
- Place of origin: Nazi Germany

Service history
- In service: 1942–1945
- Used by: See Operators
- Wars: World War II

Production history
- Designer: Erwin Aders; Henschel & Son
- Designed: 1938–1941
- Manufacturer: Henschel
- Unit cost: 250,700 ℛ︁ℳ︁ (Note: Without weapons, optics, or radio. 299,800 ℛ︁ℳ︁ combat ready.) (Note: Firstly produced Tigers price was 800.000 ℛ︁ℳ︁.)
- Produced: 1942–1944
- No. built: 1,347 (Note: Although 1,350 is a common figure, World War II magazine reported the figure of 1,355 in their January 1994 edition (p.16). Jentz gives a revised number of 1,347, including the prototype, following investigation of the primary sources.)

Specifications (RfRuK VK 4501H Ausf.E, Blatt: G-330)
- Mass: 54 tonnes (60 short tons); 57 tonnes (63 short tons) (Ausf. E) (Combat weight)
- Length: 6.316 m (20 ft 8.7 in); 8.45 m (27 ft 9 in) gun forward
- Width: 3.56 m (11 ft 8 in)
- Height: 3.00 m (9 ft 10 in)
- Crew: 5 (commander, gunner, loader, driver, radio operator)
- Armour: 25–120 mm (0.98–4.72 in)
- Main armament: 1× 8.8 cm KwK 36 L/56; 92 AP and HE rounds
- Secondary armament: 2× 7.92 mm MG 34; 4,500 rounds 4,800 rounds (Ausf. E)
- Engine: Maybach HL230 P45 V-12 petrol engine 700 PS (690 hp, 515 kW)
- Power/weight: 13 PS (9.5 kW) / tonne
- Transmission: Maybach Olvar Typ OG 40 12 16 (8 forward and 4 reverse)
- Suspension: Torsion bar
- Ground clearance: 0.47 m (1 ft 7 in)
- Fuel capacity: 540 liters
- Operational range: Road: 195 km (121 mi); Cross country: 110 km (68 mi)
- Maximum speed: 45.4 km/h (28.2 mph) on roads (Note: Sustained road speed was 40 km/h (25 mph)); 20–25 km/h (12–16 mph) cross country

The Tiger I (German: [ˈtiːɡɐ]) was a German heavy tank of World War II that began operational duty in 1942 in Africa and in the Soviet Union, usually in independent heavy tank battalions. It gave the German Army its first armoured fighting vehicle that mounted the 8.8 cm (3.5 in) KwK 36 gun (derived from the 8.8 cm Flak 36, the famous "eighty-eight"). 1,347 were built between August 1942 and August 1944. After August 1944, production of the Tiger I was phased out in favour of the Tiger II.

While the Tiger I has been called an outstanding design for its time, it has also been criticized for being overengineered, and for using expensive materials and labour-intensive production methods. In the early period, the Tiger was prone to certain types of track failures and breakdowns. It was expensive to maintain, but generally mechanically reliable. It was difficult to transport and vulnerable to immobilisation when mud, ice, and snow froze between its overlapping and interleaved Schachtellaufwerk-pattern road wheels, often jamming them solid.

The tank was given its nickname "Tiger" by the ministry for armament and ammunition by 7 August 1941, and the Roman numeral was added after the Tiger II entered production. It was classified with ordnance inventory designation Sd.Kfz. 182. The tank was later re-designated as Panzerkampfwagen VI Ausführung E (abbreviated as Pz.Kpfw. VI Ausf. E) in March 1943, with ordnance inventory designation Sd.Kfz. 181.

Today, only nine Tiger I tanks survive in museums and private collections worldwide. As of 2021, Tiger 131 (captured during the North African campaign) at the UK's Tank Museum is the only example restored to running order.

== Development ==
=== Initial development ===
Combat experience against the French SOMUA S35 cavalry tank and Char B1 heavy tank, and the British Matilda II infantry tanks during the Battle of France in June 1940 showed that the German Army needed better armed and armoured tanks.

On 26 May 1941, Henschel and Ferdinand Porsche were asked to submit designs for a 45-tonne heavy tank, to be ready by June 1942. Porsche worked on an updated version of their VK 30.01 (P) Leopard tank prototype while Henschel worked on an improved VK 36.01 (H) tank. Henschel built two prototypes: a VK 45.01 (H) H1 with an 8.8 cm L/56 cannon, and a VK 45.01 (H) H2 with a 7.5 cm L/70 cannon.

=== Final designs ===
On 22 June 1941, Germany launched Operation Barbarossa, the invasion of the Soviet Union. The Germans encountered large numbers of Soviet T-34 medium and KV-1 heavy tanks. According to Henschel designer Erwin Aders, "There was great consternation when it was discovered that the Soviet tanks were superior to anything available to the Heer."

Weight increase to 45 tonnes and an increase in gun calibre to 8.8 cm (3.5 in) were ordered for it on 26 May 1941. The due date for the new prototypes was set for 20 April 1942, Adolf Hitler's 53rd birthday. Unlike the Panther tank, the designs did not incorporate sloped armour.

Porsche and Henschel submitted prototype designs, each making use of the Krupp-designed turret. They were demonstrated at Rastenburg in front of Hitler. The Henschel design was accepted, mainly because the Porsche VK 4501 (P) prototype design used a troubled petrol-electric transmission system which needed large quantities of copper for the manufacture of its electrical drivetrain components, a strategic war material of which Germany had limited supplies with acceptable electrical properties for such uses. Production of the Panzerkampfwagen VI Ausf. H began in August 1942. Expecting an order for his tank, Porsche built 100 chassis. After the contract was awarded to Henschel, they were used for a new turretless, casemate-style tank destroyer; 91 hulls were converted into the Panzerjäger Tiger (P) in early 1943.

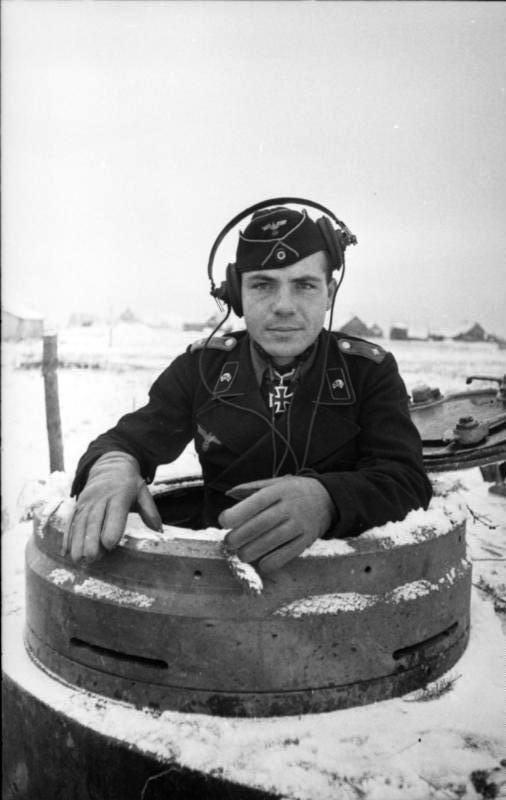
Early Tiger with tall cupola

The Tiger was still at the prototype stage when it was first hurried into service, and therefore changes both large and small were made throughout the production run. A redesigned turret with a lower cupola was the most significant change. The river-fording submersion capability and an external air-filtration system were dropped to cut costs.

== Design ==
The Tiger differed from earlier German tanks principally in its design philosophy. Its predecessors balanced mobility, armour and firepower and were sometimes outgunned by their opponents.

While heavy, this tank was not slower than the best of its opponents. Although the general design and layout were broadly similar to the Panzer IV medium tank, the Tiger weighed more than twice as much. This was due to its substantially thicker armour, the larger main gun, greater volume of fuel and ammunition storage, larger engine, and a more solidly built transmission and suspension.

=== Armour ===
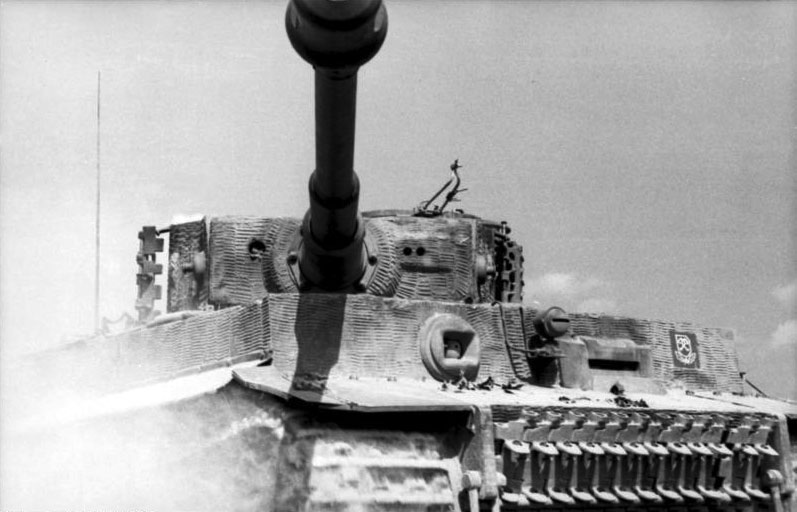
The Tiger I's armour was up to 200 mm on the gun mantlet.

The Tiger I had frontal hull armour 100 mm (3.9 in) thick, frontal turret of 100 mm and gun mantlet with a varying thickness of 110 mm (4.3 in) around the edges and 200 mm (7.9 in) around the gun. The overlap between the mantlet and turret front added to at least 200 mm behind the thinner edges. The Tiger had 60 mm (2.4 in) thick hull side plates and 80 mm (3.1 in) armour on the side superstructure/sponsons, while turret sides and rear were 80 mm. The top and bottom armour was 25 mm (1 in) thick; from March 1944, the turret roof was thickened to 40 mm (1.6 in). Armour plates were mostly flat, with interlocking construction. This flat construction encouraged angling the Tiger hull roughly 30-45° when firing in order to increase effective thickness.

At the height of its service, the Tiger’s front was practically invulnerable to all Allied guns except the British 17-pounder, US 90-mm, and Soviet 122-mm guns. According to British analysis, the Tiger proved to have exceptionally high-quality armor steel. British firing tests found that the 60 mm lower hull side plate offered resistance equivalent to 80 mm of British RHA, while the 80 mm upper hull plate was equivalent to 90 mm.

Otto Carius (who commanded 2nd Company, 502nd Battalion) remembered: "Again and again, we admired the quality of the steel on our tanks. It was hard without being brittle. Despite its hardness, it was also elastic. If an AT round didn’t hit the armour head on, it slid off on its side and left behind a gouge as if you had run your finger over a soft piece of butter."

=== Gun ===
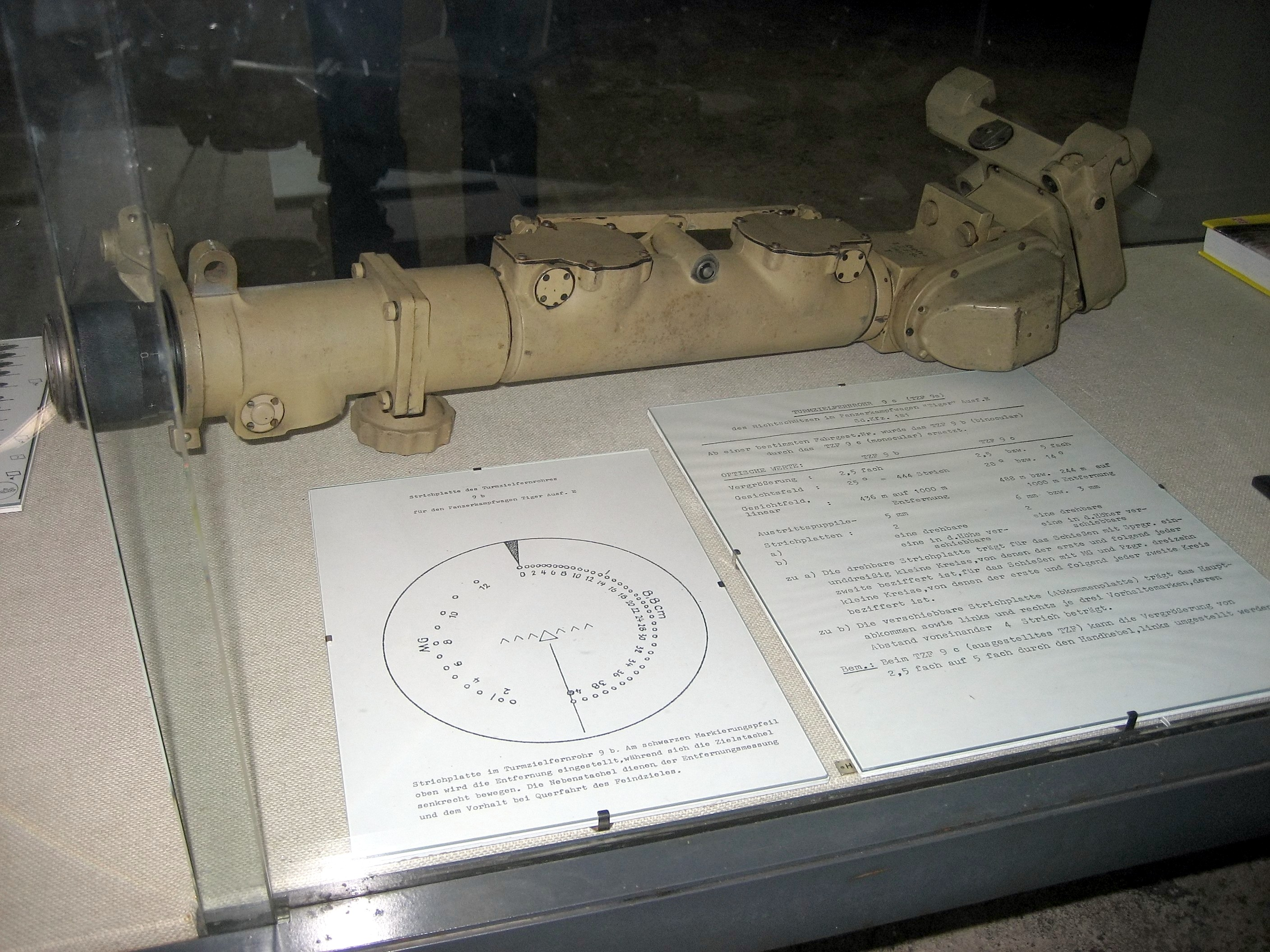
Turmzielfernrohr TZF 9c gun sight

The 56-calibre long 8.8 cm KwK 36 was chosen for the Tiger. A combination of a flat trajectory from the high muzzle velocity and precision from the Leitz Turmzielfernrohr TZF 9b sight (later replaced by the monocular TZF 9c) made it very accurate. In British wartime firing trials, five successive hits were scored on a 16 by 18 in (410 by 460 mm) target at a range of 1,200 yards (1,100 m). Compared with the other contemporary German tank guns, the 8.8 cm KwK 36 had superior penetration to the 7.5 cm KwK 40 on the Sturmgeschütz III and Panzer IV but inferior to the 7.5 cm KwK 42 on the Panther tank under ranges of 2,500 metres. At greater ranges, the 8.8 cm KwK 36 was superior in penetration and accuracy. British trials found the gun took from 6 to 16 seconds to reload varying on turret position and consequently which storage bin was being used.

The ammunition for the Tiger had electrically fired primers. Four types of ammunition were available but not all were fully available; the PzGr 40 shell used tungsten, which was in short supply as the war progressed.

- PzGr. 39 (armour-piercing, capped, ballistic cap)
- PzGr. 40 (armour-piercing, composite rigid)
- Hl. Gr. 39 (high explosive anti-tank)
- sch. Sprgr. Patr. L/4.5 (incendiary shrapnel)

=== Engine and drive ===
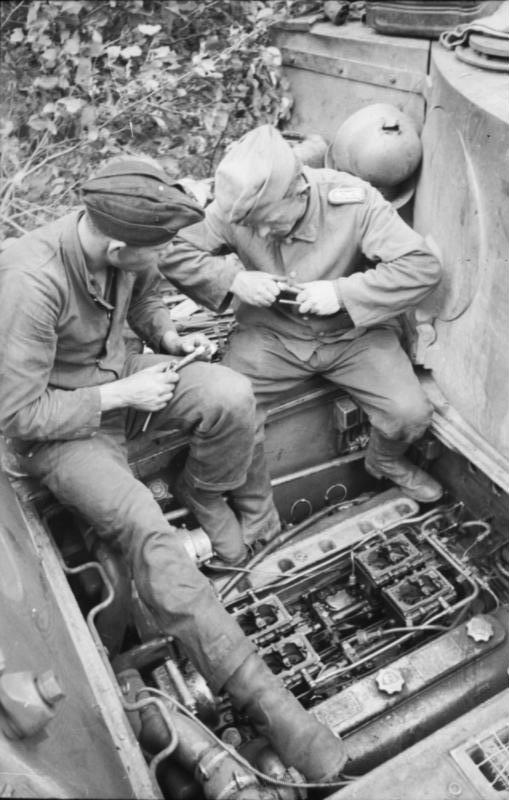
Crew working on the engine through the hatch on the rear hull roof

The rear of the tank held an engine compartment flanked by two separate rear compartments each containing a fuel tank and radiator. The Germans had not developed an adequate diesel engine, so a petrol (gasoline) powerplant had to be used instead. The original engine used was a 21.35 L (1,303 in^{3}) 12-cylinder Maybach HL210 P45 developing 485 kW (650 hp) at 3,000 rpm and a top speed of 38 km/h (24 mph). It was found to be underpowered for the vehicle. From the 251st Tiger onwards, It was replaced by the upgraded HL 230 P45, a 23.095 L (1,409 in^{3}) engine developing 521 kW (699 hp) at 3,000 rpm. The main difference between these engines was that the original Maybach HL 210 used an aluminium engine block while the Maybach HL 230 used a cast-iron engine block. The cast-iron block allowed for larger cylinders (and thus, greater displacement) which increased the power output to 521 kW (699 hp). The engine was in V-form, with two cylinder banks set at 60 degrees. An inertia starter was mounted on its right side, driven via chain gears through a port in the rear wall. The engine could be lifted out through a hatch on the rear hull roof. In comparison to other V12 and various vee-form gasoline engines used for tanks, the eventual HL 230 engine was nearly 4 L (240 in^{3}) smaller in displacement than the Allied British Rolls-Royce Meteor V12 AFV power plant, itself adapted from the RR Merlin but de-rated to 448 kW (601 hp) power output; and the American Ford-designed precursor V12 to its Ford GAA V-8 AFV engine of 18 litre displacement, which in its original V12 form would have had the same 27 L (1,600 in^{3}) displacement as the Meteor

The 501st Heavy Panzer Battalion (sPzAbt 501) reported in May 1943:

…Regarding the overheating engines, the HL 210 engine caused no troubles during the recent time. All occurring breakdowns resulted from the low quality of driver training. In several cases engine failures have to be put down to the missing remote engine thermometer. Five engines have reached more than 3,000 km without essential failures. A good driver is essential for the successful deployment of the Tiger, he must have a good technical training and has to keep his nerve in critical situations…

The engine drove the front sprockets through a drivetrain connecting to a transmission in the front portion of the lower hull; the front sprockets had to be mounted relatively low as a result. The Krupp-designed 11-tonne turret had a hydraulic motor whose pump was powered by mechanical drive from the engine. A full rotation took about a minute.

Another new feature was the Maybach-Olvar hydraulically controlled semi-automatic pre-selector gearbox. The extreme weight of the tank also required a new steering system. Germany's Argus Motoren, where Hermann Klaue had invented a ring brake in 1940, supplied them for the Arado Ar 96 and also supplied the 55 cm (22 in) disc. Klaue was acknowledged in the patent application that he had improved, it can even be traced back to British designs dating to 1904. It is unclear whether Klaue's patent ring brake was used in the Tiger brake design.

The clutch-and-brake system, typical for lighter vehicles, was retained only for emergencies. Normally, steering depended on a double differential, Henschel's development of the British Merritt-Brown system first encountered in the Churchill tank. The vehicle had an eight-speed gearbox, and the steering offered two fixed radii of turns on each gear, thus the Tiger had sixteen different radii of turn. In first gear, at a speed of a few km/h, the minimal turning radius was 3.44 m (11 ft 3 in). In neutral gear, the tracks could be turned in opposite directions, so the Tiger I pivoted in place. There was a steering wheel instead of either a tiller – or, as most tanks had at that time, twin braking levers – making the Tiger I's steering system easy to use, and ahead of its time.

Powered turret traverse was provided by the variable speed Boehringer-Sturm L4 hydraulic motor, which was driven from the main engine by a secondary drive shaft. On early production versions of the Tiger maximum turret traverse was limited to 6 degrees per second, whilst on later versions a selectable high speed traverse gear was added. Thus, the turret could be rotated 360 degrees at up to 6 degrees per second in low gear independent of engine rpm (same as on early production versions), or up to 19 degrees per second with the high-speed setting and engine at 2,000 rpm, and at over 36 degrees per second at the maximum allowable engine speed of 3,000 rpm. The direction and speed of traverse was controlled by the gunner through foot pedals, the speed of traverse corresponding to the level of depression the gunner applied to the foot pedal. This system allowed for very precise control of powered traverse, a light touch on the pedal resulting in a minimum traverse speed of 0.1 degrees per second (360 degrees in 60 minutes), unlike in most other tanks of the time (e.g., the US M4 Sherman or Soviet T-34) this allowed for fine laying of the gun without the gunner needing to use his traverse handwheel.

=== Suspension ===
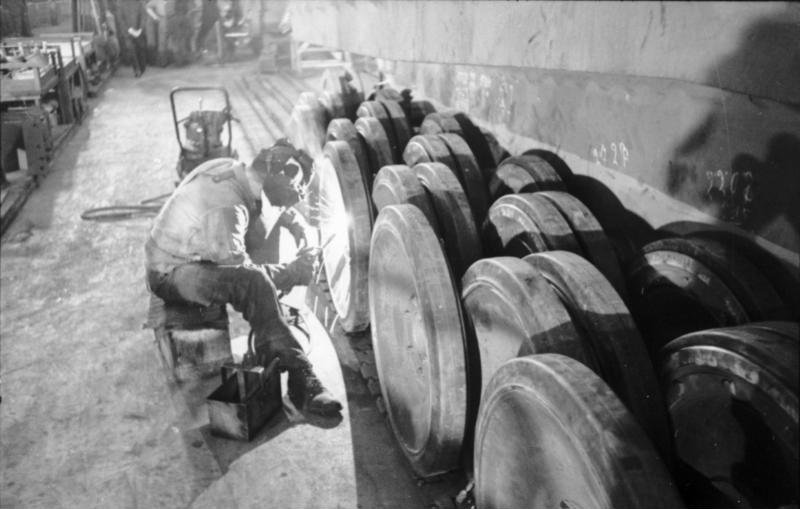
Clear view of the Tiger I's Schachtellaufwerk overlapping and interleaved road wheels during production

The suspension used sixteen torsion bars, with eight suspension arms per side. To save space, the swing arms were leading on one side and trailing on the other side; this is called an H suspension setup. There were three road wheels (one of them double, closest to the track's centre) on each arm, in a so-called Schachtellaufwerk overlapping and interleaved arrangement, similar to that pioneered on German half-tracked military vehicles of the pre-World War II era, with the Tiger I being the first all-tracked German AFV built in quantity to use such a road wheel arrangement. The wheels had a diameter of 800 mm (31 in) in the Schachtellaufwerk arrangement for the Tiger I's suspension, providing a high uniform distribution of the load onto the track, at the cost of increased maintenance.

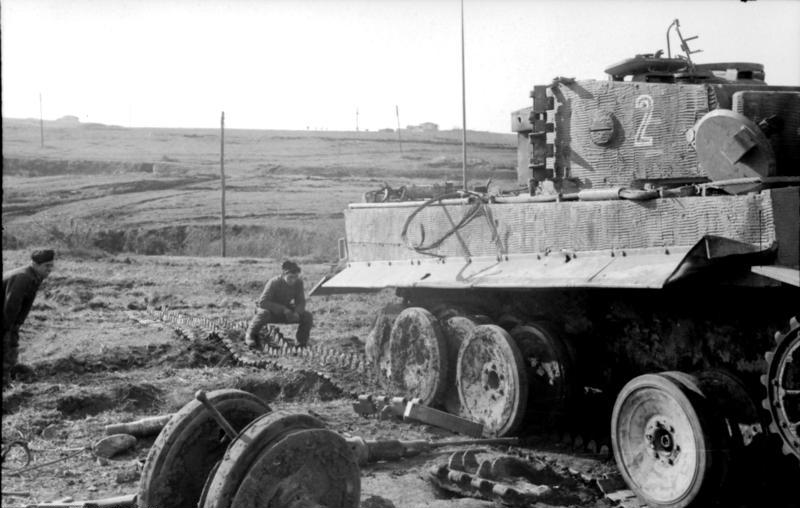
Wheel and track maintenance in muddy conditions

Removing an inner wheel that had lost its solid rubber tire (a common occurrence) required the removal of up to nine other wheels first. During the rainy period that brought on the autumn rasputitsa mud season and onwards into the winter conditions on the Eastern front, the roadwheels of a Schachtellaufwerk-equipped vehicle could also become packed with mud or snow that could then freeze. Presumably, German engineers, based on the experience of the half-tracks, felt that the improvement in off-road performance, track and wheel life, mobility with wheels missing or damaged, plus additional protection from enemy fire was worth the maintenance difficulties of a complex system vulnerable to mud and ice. This approach was carried on, in various forms, to the Panther and the non-interleaved wheel design for the Tiger II. Eventually, a new 80 cm diameter 'steel' wheel design with an internally sprung steel-rim tire was substituted. As these new wheels could carry more weight, the outermost wheel on each suspension arm was removed. The same wheels would also be used on the Tiger II.

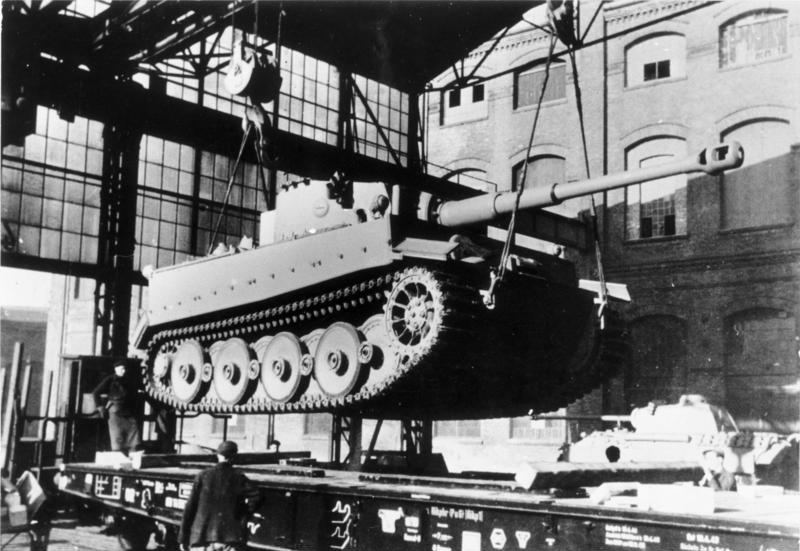
Tiger at the Henschel plant is loaded onto a special rail car. The outer road wheels have been removed and narrow tracks put in place to decrease vehicle width, allowing it to fit within the loading gauge of the German rail network.

To support the considerable weight of the Tiger, the tracks were 725 mm (28.5 in) wide. To meet rail-freight size restrictions, narrower 520 mm (20 in) wide 'transport' tracks (Verladeketten) could be installed. For Tigers equipped with rubber-tired wheels, this also required the outermost roadwheel on each axle (16 total) to be removed. The track replacement and wheel removal took 30 minutes for each side of the tank. However, in service, Tigers were frequently transported by rail with their combat tracks fitted, as long as the train crew knew there were no narrow tunnels or other obstructions on the route that would prevent an oversized load from passing, despite this practice being strictly forbidden.

=== Fording system ===
The Tiger tank's combat weight of 56 tons was often too heavy for small bridges which had 35 ton weight limits, so it was designed to ford bodies of water up to 5 m (15 ft) deep. This required unusual mechanisms for ventilation and cooling when underwater. At least 30 minutes of set-up time was required, with the turret and gun being locked in the forward position, and a large snorkel tube raised at the rear. An inflatable doughnut-shaped ring sealed the turret ring. The two rear compartments (each containing a fuel tank, radiator and fans) were floodable. However, this ability was found to be of limited practical value for its high cost and was removed from production lines in August 1943. As a result, only the first 495 units were fitted with this deep fording system; all later models were capable of fording water only two metres deep.

=== Crew compartment ===
The internal layout was typical of German tanks. Forward was an open crew compartment, with the driver and radio-operator seated at the front on either side of the gearbox. Behind them the turret floor was surrounded by panels forming a continuous level surface. This helped the loader to retrieve the ammunition, which was mostly stowed above the tracks. Three men were seated in the turret; the loader to the right of the gun facing to the rear, the gunner to the left of the gun, and the commander behind him. There was also a folding seat on the right for the loader. The turret had a full circular floor and 157 cm (62 in) headroom. Early versions of the Tiger I's turret included two pistol ports; however, one of these was replaced with a loader escape hatch and the other was removed from later designs.

Post-war testing by the Allies found the tank to be uncomfortable and spartan. For example, the gunner suffered from clumsy controls and a cramped area. This was in contrast to German crews who found them to be spacious and comfortable.

=== Cost ===
A substantial problem with the Tiger was, as a heavy tank, its production required considerable resources in terms of manpower and material, which led to it being more expensive than armored vehicles such as the Panzer IV and the StuG III assault gun. The procurement cost of a Tiger I was 290,375 Reichsmark (RM); at this price, approximately 2.8 Panzer IV tanks or 3.5 StuG III assault guns could be procured for the cost of a single Tiger. Henschel estimated an export price of RM645,000 for delivery of a Tiger to the Japanese government in December 1942. However, the Tigerfibel crew manual of 1 August 1943 stated that each Tiger cost RM800,000 and required 300,000 work-hours. Steven J. Zaloga regarded the Japanese purchase price as being closer to the Tiger's underlying production cost, while Bruce Newsome argued that the Tiger was sold with a profit margin of 55 percent and that the higher figures presented in the Tigerfibel reflected wartime propaganda intended to encourage operational efficiency. According to Newsome, Tigers were relatively rare because they were produced in part of one factory, not because they were relatively difficult to produce. Only 1,347 Tiger I and 492 Tiger II tanks were built.

The closest counterpart to the Tiger from the United States was the M26 Pershing (around 200 deployed to the European Theater of Operations (ETO) during the war) and the IS-2 from the USSR (about 3,800 built during the conflict).

From a technical point of view, it was better than its contemporaries. Despite the low number produced, shortages in qualified crew and the considerable fuel consumption in the face of ever shrinking resources, Tigers (including Tiger IIs) destroyed at least 8,100 enemy tanks and 11,380 anti-tank guns and artillery pieces for the loss of 1,725 Tigers (including large numbers of operational and strategic losses, i.e. abandoned, broken down, etc.).

== Production history ==
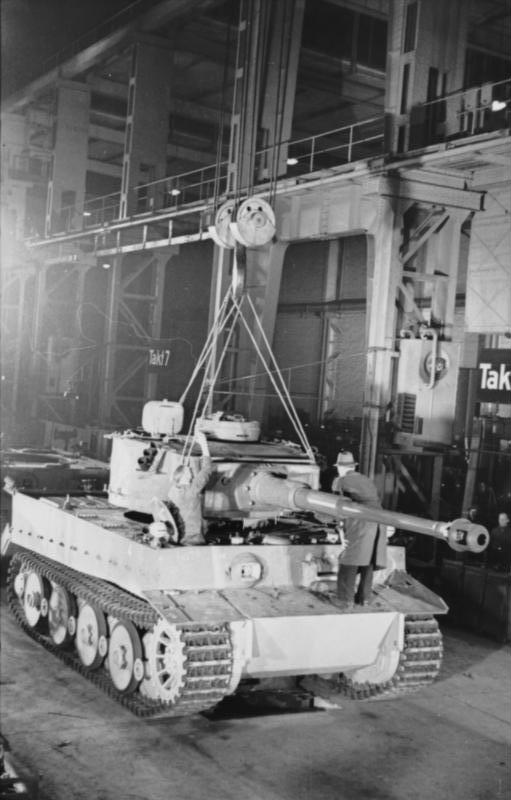
Installing the turret

Production of the Tiger I began in August 1942 at the factory of Henschel und Sohn in Kassel, initially at a rate of 25 per month and peaking in April 1944 at 104 per month. An official document of the time stated that the first Tiger I was completed on 4 August. 1,355 had been built by August 1944, when production ceased. Deployed Tiger I's peaked at 671 on 1 July 1944. It took about twice as long to build a Tiger I as another German tank of the period. When the improved Tiger II began production in January 1944, the Tiger I was soon phased out.

In 1943, Japan bought several specimens of German tank designs for study. A single Tiger I was apparently purchased, along with a Panther and two Panzer IIIs, but only the Panzer IIIs were actually delivered. The undelivered Tiger was loaned to the German Wehrmacht by the Japanese government.

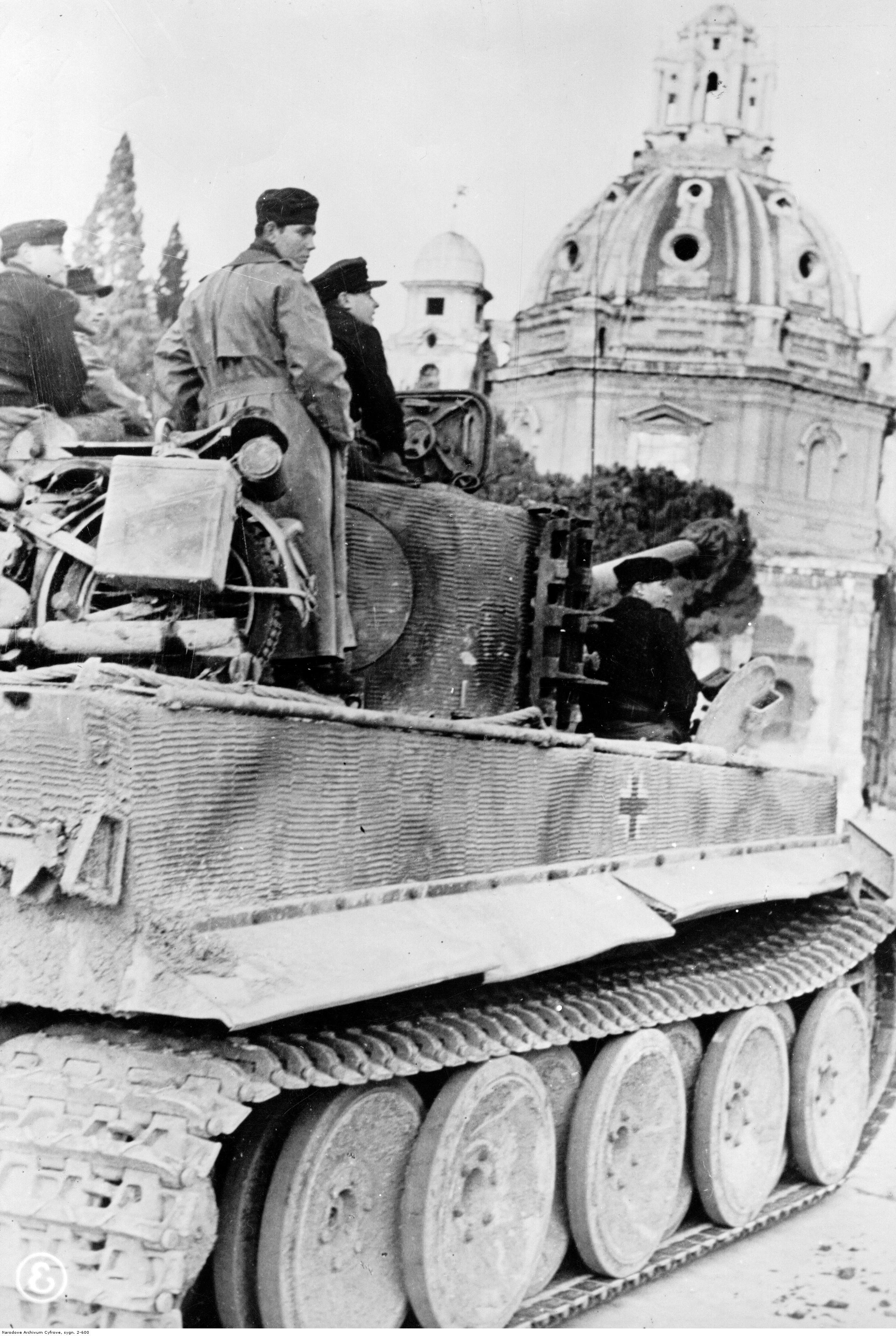
Tiger I Ausf. H1 covered in Zimmerit anti-magnetic mine paste in Greece, 1944.

Many modifications were introduced during the production run to improve automotive performance, firepower and protection. Simplification of the design was implemented, along with cuts due to raw material shortages. In 1942 alone, at least six revisions were made, starting with the removal of the Vorpanzer (frontal armour shield) from the pre-production models in April. In May, mudguards bolted onto the side of the pre-production run were added, while removable mudguards saw full incorporation in September. Smoke discharge canisters, three on each side of the turret, were added in August 1942. In later years, similar changes and updates were added, such as the addition of Zimmerit (a non-magnetic anti-mine coating), in late 1943. Due to slow production rates at the factories, incorporation of the new modifications could take several months.

The humorous and somewhat racy crew manual, the Tigerfibel, was the first of its kind for the German Army and its success resulted in more unorthodox manuals that attempted to emulate its style.

== Variants ==
Among other variants of the Tiger, a heavily armoured casemate self-propelled rocket projector, today commonly known as the Sturmtiger, was built, which mounted a 38 cm (15 in) rocket launcher. A tank recovery version of the Porsche Tiger I (Bergetiger), and one Porsche Tiger I, was issued to the 654th Heavy Tank Destroyer Battalion, which was equipped with the Ferdinand/Elefant. In Italy, a demolition carrier version of the Tiger I without a main gun was built by maintenance crews in an effort to find a way to clear minefields. It is often misidentified as a BergeTiger recovery vehicle. As many as three may have been built. It carried a demolition charge on a small crane on the turret in place of the main gun. It was to move up to a minefield and drop the charge, back away, and then set the charge off to clear the minefield. There is no verification of any being used in combat.

Another variant was the Fahrschulpanzer VI Tiger tanks (driving school Tiger tanks). These tanks were Tigers with modified engines to run on either compressed Towngas gas (Stadtgas System) or wood gas (Holzgas System). This was due to shortages in fuel supply. They used a mixture of turreted and turretless hulls. They were used to train Tiger tank crews, and were not used in combat.

== Designations ==
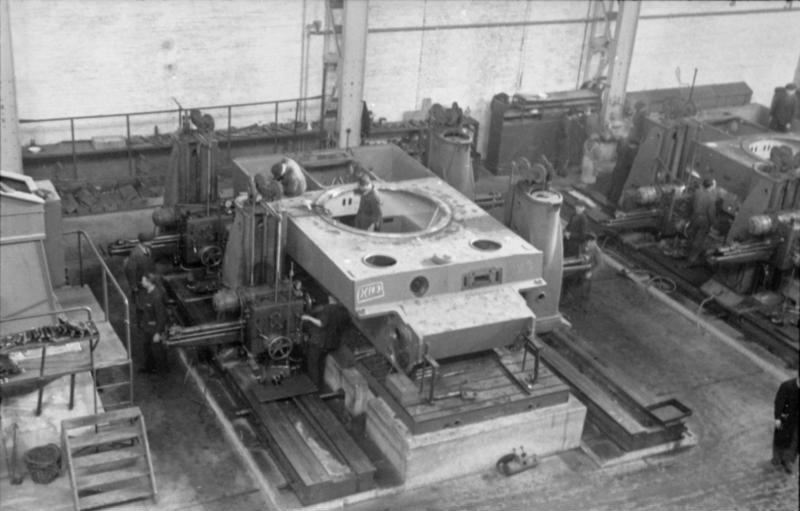
Tigers under construction. This hull rests on a jig (1944)

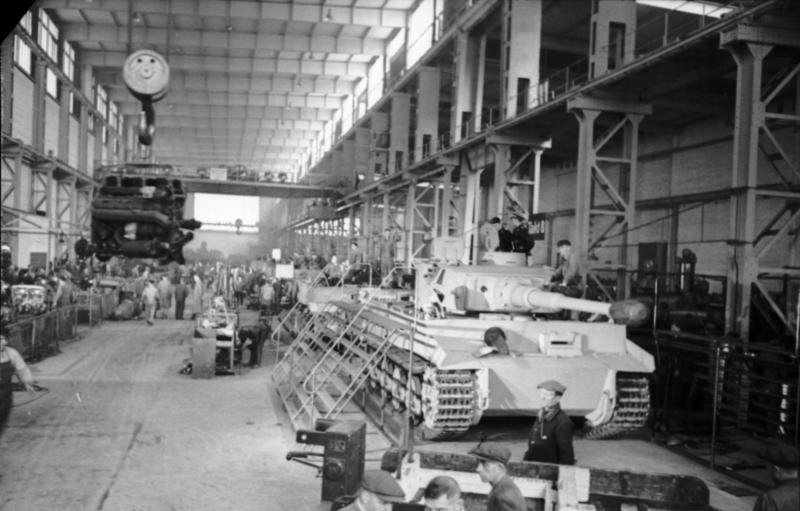
Assembly facility; the vehicles are fitted with the narrower transport tracks (1943)

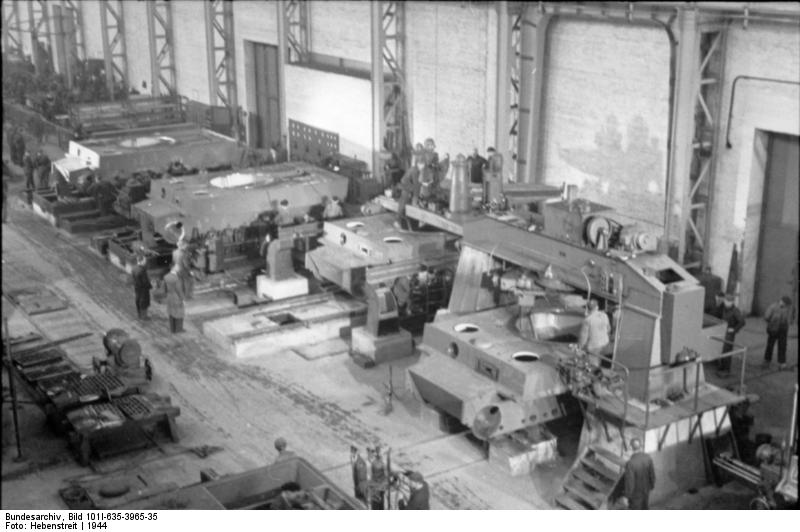
Tigers being built(1944)

Designations of Tiger I
Designation	Reference	Date
Prototypes
VK 45.01	Henschel	28 July 1941
Pz.Kpfw. VI Ausf. H1 (VK 4501)	Wa Prüf 6 (Note: Waffenamt Prüfwesen 6 – Panzer and Motorized Equipment Branch of the Heereswaffenamt (Army Weapons Department))	21 October 1941
VK 4501 (H)	Wa J Rue (WuG 6) (Note: Wa J Ru-WuG 6—Panzerkraftwagen und Zugkraftwagenabteilung ("Tanks and Tractors Branch") of the Amtsgruppe fur Industrielle Rüstung—Waffen und Gerät ("Group for Weapons and Equipment Manufacture"))	5 January 1942
Tiger H1 (VK 4501 – Aufbau fur 8,8 cm Kw.K.Krupp-Turm)	Wa Prüf 6	February 1942
Pz.Kpfw. VI (VK 4501/H Ausf. H1 (Tiger))	Wa Prüf 6	2 March 1942
Pz.Kpfw. "Tiger" H	Wa J Rue (WuG 6)	20 June 1942
Pz.Kpfw. VI; VK 4501 (H); Tiger (H) Krupp-Turm mit 8.8 cm Kw.K. L/56 fur Ausf. H1	Wa Prüf 6	1 July 1942
Production
Panzerkampfwagen VI H (Sd.Kfz. 182)	KStN 1150d	15 August 1942
Tiger I	Wa Prüf 6	15 October 1942
Pz.Kpfw. VI H Ausf. H1 (Tiger H1)	–	1 December 1942
Panzerkampfwagen VI H Ausf. H1; Panzerkampfwagen Tiger Ausf. E	D656/21+ (Tank manual)	March 1943
Pz.Kpfw. Tiger (8,8 cm L/56) (Sd.Kfz. 181)	KStN 1176e	5 March 1943
Panzerkampfwagen Tiger Ausf. E (Sd.Kfz. 181); Panzerkampfwagen Tiger Ausf. E	D656/22 (Tank manual)	7 September 1944

Hitler's order, dated 27 February 1944, abolished the designation Panzerkampfwagen VI and ratified Panzerkampfwagen Tiger Ausf. E, which was the official designation until the end of the war. For common use it was frequently shortened to Tiger.

== Combat history ==
=== Gun and armour performance ===
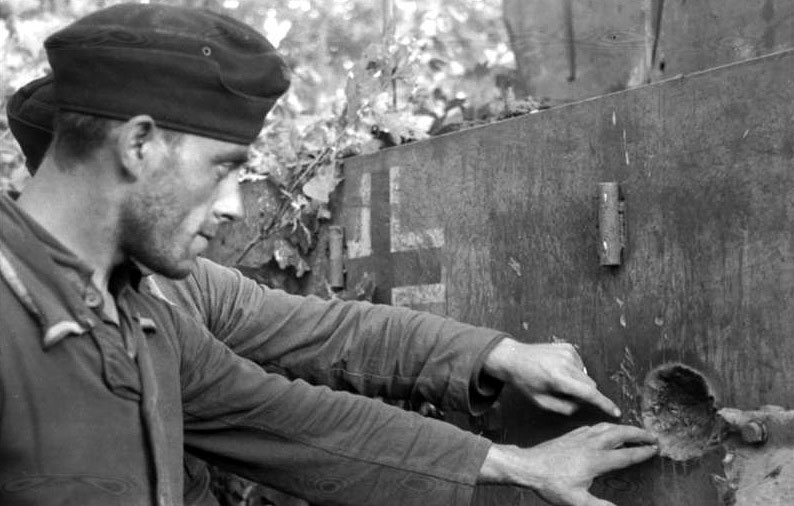
German soldiers inspect a non-penetrating hit to the Tiger's armour.

A report prepared by the Waffenamt-Prüfwesen 1 gave the calculated probability of perforation at range, on which various adversaries would be defeated reliably at a side angle of 30 degrees to the incoming round.

The Wa Prüf report estimated that the Tiger's 88 mm gun would be capable of penetrating the differential case of an American M4 Sherman from 2,100 m (1.3 mi) and the turret front from 1,800 m (1.1 mi), but the Tiger's 88 mm gun would not penetrate the upper glacis plate at any range assuming a side angle of 30 degrees. Users found that the gun could destroy tanks far beyond official estimates. For instance, a Tiger claimed a Sherman at 2,700 m (1.68 mi) during a US counter-attack from Sidi Bou Zid on 14 February 1943; and, in Sicily, a Tiger claimed Shermans at 2,800 m (1.74 mi).

The M4 Sherman's 75 mm gun would not penetrate the Tiger frontally at any range, and needed to be within 100 m (300 ft) to achieve a side penetration against the 80 mm upper hull superstructure. The Sherman's upgraded 76 mm gun might penetrate the Tiger's driver's front plate from 600 m (2,000 ft), the nose from 400 m (1,300 ft) and the turret front from 700 m (2,300 ft). The M3 90 mm cannon used as a towed anti-aircraft and anti-tank gun, and later mounted in the M36 tank destroyer and finally the late-war M26 Pershing, could penetrate the Tiger's front plate at a range of 1,000 m (0.62 mi) using standard ammunition, and from beyond 2,000 m (1.2 mi) when using HVAP.

Soviet ground trial testing conducted in May 1943 determined that the 8.8 cm KwK 36 gun could pierce the T-34/76 frontal beam nose and front hull from 1,500 m (0.93 mi). A hit to the driver's hatch would force it to collapse inwards and break apart. (Note: The data used here is from the Soviet Military Intelligence Service. With the capture of an intact Tiger at Lake Ladoga the Soviets obtained data regarding the Tiger's technical and tactical capabilities. By test firing the 8.8 cm gun against a T-34 hull, data was obtained that led to several improvements of the T-34 and development of the IS II as a new breakthrough tank. By increasing the thickness of the armour and mounting it with a very heavy 122 mm gun, the Soviet IS II became a very difficult tank to deal with.) According to the Wa Prüf 1 report, the Soviet T-34-85's upper glacis and turret front armour would be defeated between 100 and 1,400 m (0.062 and 0.870 mi) at a side angle of 30 deg, while the T-34's 85 mm gun was estimated to penetrate the front of a Tiger between 200 and 500 m (660 and 1,640 ft) at a side angle of 30 degrees to the incoming round. Soviet testing showed that the 85 mm gun could penetrate the front of a Tiger from 1,000 m (0.6 mi) with no side angle.

At a side impact angle of 30 degrees the 120 mm hull armour of the Soviet IS-2 model 1943 would be defeated between 100 and 300 m (330 and 980 ft) at the driver's front plate and nose. The IS-2's 122 mm gun could penetrate the Tiger's front armour from between 1,500 and 2,500 m (0.93 and 1.55 mi), depending on the impact angle. However, according to Steven Zaloga, the IS-2 and Tiger I could each knock the other out in normal combat distances below 1,000 m (0.62 mi). At longer ranges, the performance of each respective tank against each other was dependent on the crew and the combat situation.

The British Churchill Mk IV was vulnerable to the Tiger from the front at between 1,100 and 1,700 m (0.68 and 1.06 mi) at a 30 degrees side angle, its strongest point being the nose and its weakest the turret. According to an STT document dated April 1944, it was estimated that the British 76.2 mm 17-pounder (used as an anti-tank gun, on the Sherman Firefly tank, and self-propelled guns) firing its normal APCBC ammunition, would penetrate the turret front and driver's visor plate of the Tiger out to 1,700 m; 1.1 mi.

When engaging targets, Tiger crews were encouraged to angle the hull to the 10:30 or 1:30 clock position (45 degrees) relative to the target, an orientation referred to as the Mahlzeit Stellung. (Note: This roughly translates as "meal position", using 10:30 for breakfast time and 1:30 for lunch.) This would maximize the effective front hull armour to 180 mm and side hull to 140 mm, making the Tiger impervious to any Allied gun up to 152 mm. The Tiger's lack of slope for its armour made angling the hull by manual means simple and effective, and unlike the lighter Panzer IV and Panther tanks, the Tiger's thick side armour gave a degree of confidence of immunity from flank attacks. The tank was also immune to Soviet anti-tank rifle fire to the sides and rear. Its large calibre 8.8 cm provided superior fragmentation and high explosive content over the 7.5 cm KwK 42 gun. Therefore, comparing the Tiger with the Panther, for supporting the infantry and destroying fortifications, the Tiger offered superior firepower.

The destruction of an antitank gun was often accepted as nothing special by lay people and soldiers from other branches. Only the destruction of other tanks counted as a success. On the other hand, antitank guns counted twice as much to the experienced tanker. They were much more dangerous to us. The antitank cannon waited in ambush, well camouflaged, and magnificently set up in the terrain. Because of that, it was very difficult to identify. It was also very difficult to hit because of its low height. Usually, we didn't make out the antitank guns until they had fired the first shot. We were often hit right away, if the antitank crew was on top of things, because we had run into a wall of antitank guns. It was then advisable to keep as cool as possible and take care of the enemy, before the second aimed shot was fired.

— Otto Carius (translated by Robert J. Edwards), Tigers in the Mud

=== First actions ===
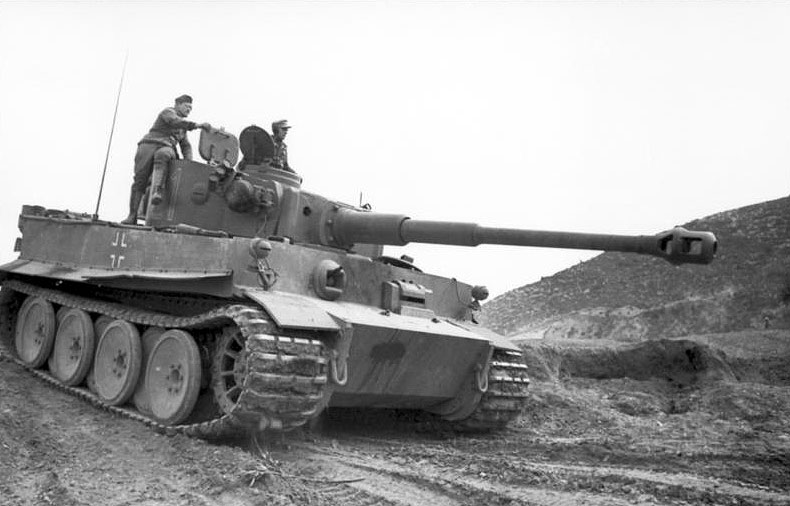
A Tiger I deployed to supplement the Afrika Korps operating in Tunisia, January 1943

Eager to make use of the powerful new weapon, Hitler ordered the vehicle be pressed into service months earlier than had been planned. A platoon of four Tigers went into action on 23 September 1942 near Leningrad. Operating in swampy, forested terrain, their movement was largely confined to roads and tracks, making defence against them far easier. Many of these early models were plagued by problems with the transmission, which had difficulty handling the great weight of the vehicle if pushed too hard. It took time for drivers to learn how to avoid overtaxing the engine and transmission, and many broke down. The most significant event from this engagement was that one of the Tigers became stuck in swampy ground and had to be abandoned. Captured largely intact, it enabled the Soviets to study the design and prepare countermeasures.

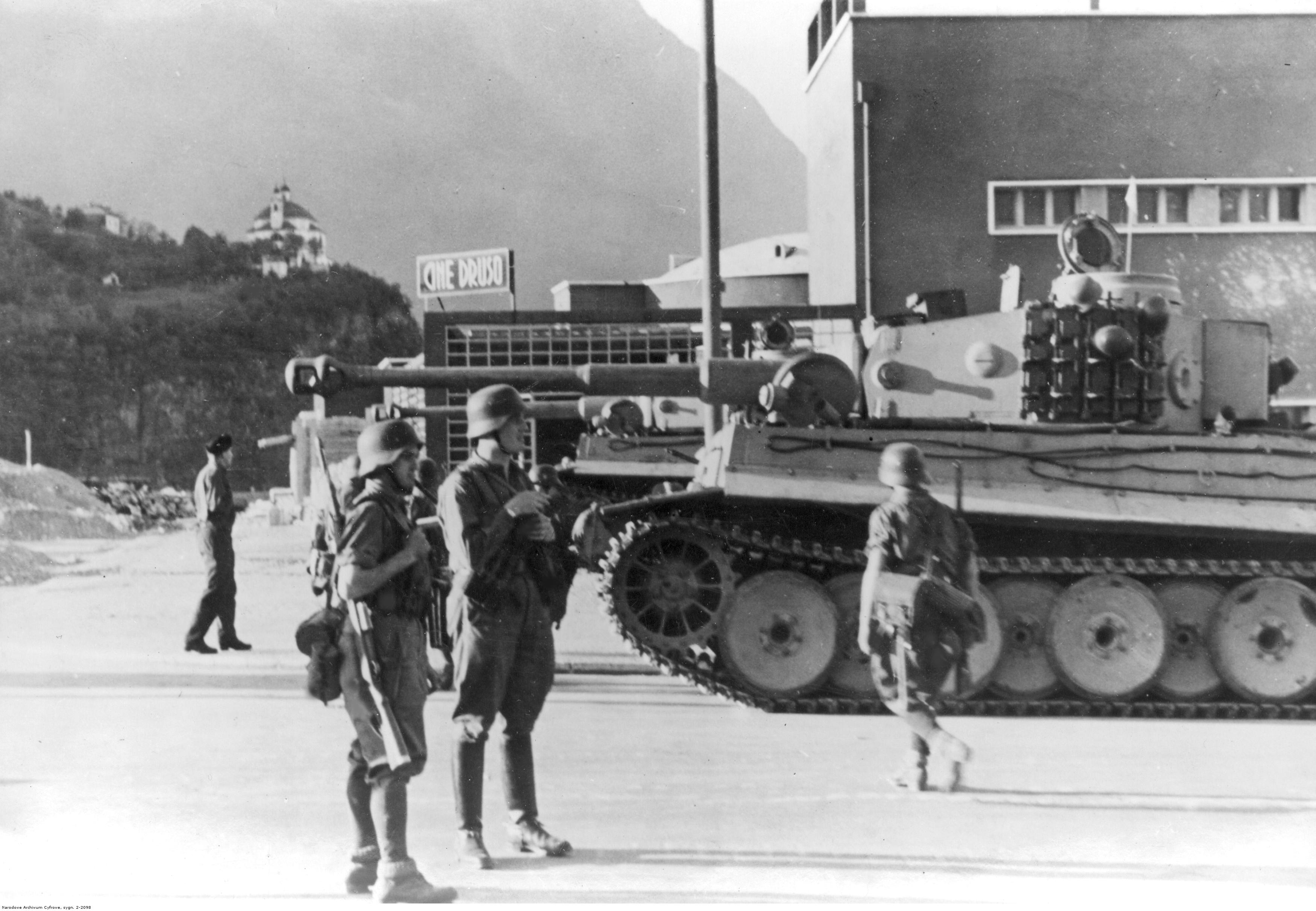
Tiger I tank on the streets of Bolzano Italy, September 1943

The 503rd Heavy Panzer Battalion was deployed to the Don Front in the autumn of 1942, but arrived too late to participate in Operation Winter Storm, the attempt to relieve Stalingrad. It was subsequently engaged in heavy defensive fighting in the Rostov-on-Don and adjacent sectors in January and February 1943.

In the North African Campaign, the Tiger I first saw action during the Tunisian Campaign on 1 December 1942 east of Tebourba, when three Tigers attacked an olive grove 5 km (3.1 mi) west of Djedeida. The thick olive grove made visibility very limited and enemy tanks were engaged at close range. The Tigers were hit by a number of M3 Lee tanks firing at a range of 80 to 100 metres (260 to 330 ft). Two of the Lees were knocked out in this action, while the Tiger tanks provided effective protection from enemy fire, which greatly increased the crews' trust in the quality of the armour. The first loss to an Allied gun was on 20 January 1943 near Robaa, when a battery of the British 72nd Anti-Tank Regiment knocked out a Tiger with their 6-pounder (57 mm) anti-tank guns. Seven Tigers were immobilised by mines during the failed attack on Béja during Operation Ochsenkopf at the end of February.

=== Later actions ===
In July 1943, two heavy tank battalions (503rd and 505th) took part in Operation Citadel, including the Battle of Kursk, with one battalion each on the northern (505th) and southern (503rd) flanks of the Kursk salient the operation was designed to encircle. Although the Tiger often proved dominating, when it saw action, the operation ultimately failed and the Germans were again put on the defensive. The resulting withdrawal led to the loss of many broken-down Tigers which had to be abandoned, with battalions unable to perform required maintenance or repairs.

On 11 April 1945, a Tiger I destroyed three M4 Sherman tanks and an armoured car advancing on a road. On 12 April, a Tiger I (F02) destroyed two Comet tanks, one half-track and one scout car. This Tiger I was destroyed by a Comet tank of A Squadron of the 3rd Royal Tank Regiment on the next day without infantry support.

=== Mobility and reliability ===
Percentage of late war panzer models operational
Date	Western front			Eastern front		
Date	Pz IV	Panther	Tiger	Pz IV	Panther	Tiger
31 May 44	88	82	87	84	77	79
14 Sep 44	80	74	98	65	72	70
30 Sep 44	50	57	67	65	60	81
31 Oct 44	74	85	88	52	54	54
15 Nov 44	78	71	81	72	66	61
30 Nov 44	76	71	45	78	67	72
15 Dec 44	78	71	64	79	69	79
30 Dec 44	63	53	50	72	62	80
15 Jan 45	56	47	58	71	60	73
15 Mar 45	44	32	36	54	49	53
Average	71	65	65	68	62	70

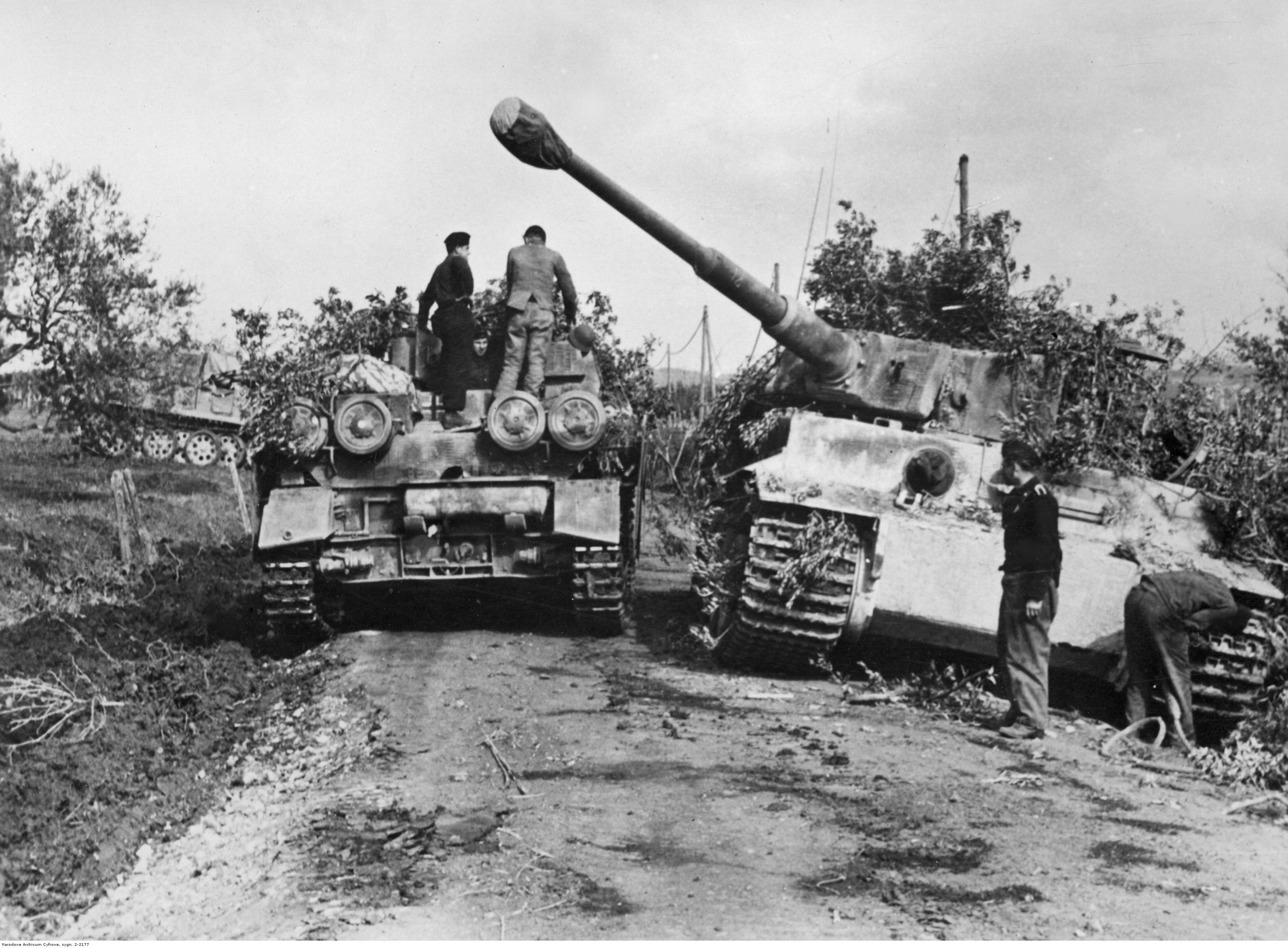
A camouflaged Tiger I and several other vehicles at a field repair point during the Anzio-Nettuno operation in 1943.

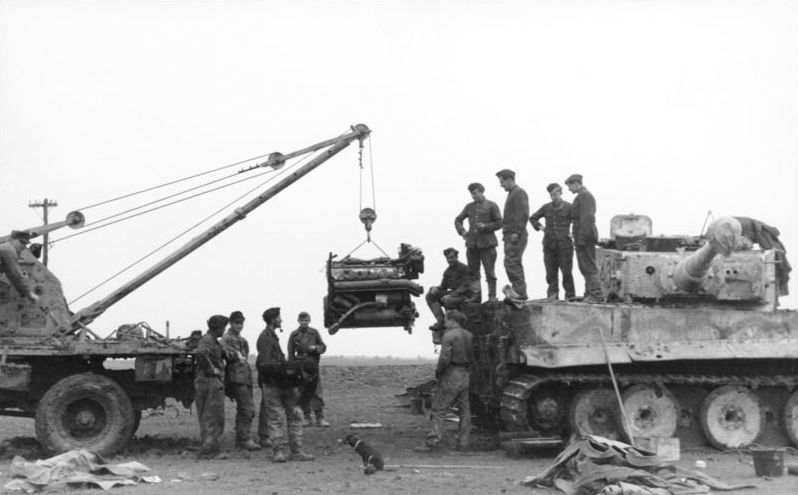
A Tiger undergoing engine repairs

The tank's weight significantly limited its use of bridges. For this reason, the Tiger was built with water-tight hatches and a snorkel device that allowed it to ford water obstacles four metres deep. The tank's weight also made driving through buildings risky, as the presence of a cellar could result in a sudden drop.

Due to reliability problems with the Maybach HL 210 TRM P45, which was delivered within the first production batch of 250 Tigers, performance for its maximum power output at high gear ratio could not be fulfilled. Though the Maybach engines had a maximum of 3,000 rpm, crews were told in the Tigerfibel not to exceed 2,600 rpm. The engine limitation was alleviated only by the adoption of the Maybach HL 230. The turret could also be traversed manually, but this option was rarely used, except when the engine was turned off or sometimes for very small adjustments.

The Tiger’s power-assisted driving controls, semi-automatic 8-speed transmission, regenerative controlled differential steering, powerful engine, large interleaved roadwheels, torsion bar suspension, broad tracks, and squarer ground contact made for exceptional ease of driving, agility, and speed for a heavy tank of its time.Early Tigers had a top speed of about 45 km/h (28 mph) over optimal terrain; comparable with US medium tanks and most British cruiser tanks, which were just over half as heavy. This was not recommended for normal operation, and was discouraged in training. An engine governor was installed in November 1943, capping the engine at 2,500 rpm and the Tiger's maximum speed to about 38 km/h (24 mph).

According to British calculations for "mean maximum pressure" from the 1970s, the mean maximum pressures exerted by Tiger and T-34 were practically the same, the Churchill tank about one quarter more, the Sherman and Soviet heavy tanks about one half more, and the cruiser tanks about twice as great. In the medium to heavy classes, only Panther exerted less ground pressure and mean maximum pressure than Tiger, and no main battle tank has done better. The Tiger's low ground pressure meant that it could cross soft ground that most Western Allied tanks could not.

The disadvantages of overlapping wheels are expense, the build-up of mud, rocks, or ice between wheels, and the difficulty of replacing wheels on the inner row. The British 25th Tank Brigade reported that changing a single wheel unit on a Churchill tank took two hours. One German unit reported that changing an innermost wheel on a Tiger took up to ten hours.

A combat report from the 13. Kompanie/Panzer-Regiment "Großdeutschland", dated 27 March 1943, noted the following about the Tiger’s mobility:

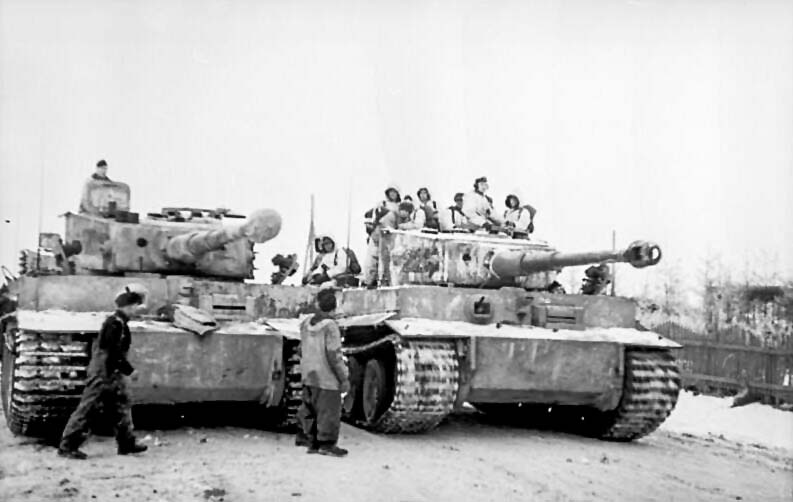
Tiger tanks in snow

In one instance, two Tigers pursued five T-34s at a distance of approximately 2 km (1.2 mi). Despite the thin layer of snow covering the ground and the relatively firm terrain, the gap between the two groups could not be reduced. The Tiger's maneuverability is in no way inferior to that of the T-34. Due to its good maneuverability characteristics, the Tiger is suitable for operating in the vanguard. Particularly surprising, in relation to other tanks, is its rapid acceleration, a very important characteristic within a vanguard company; snow depths of up to 1.3 m and loose snow terrain pose no obstacle.

Tiger battalions had instructions to march at 30 km/h (19 mph) on roads, and 20–25 km/h (12–16 mph) on "average terrain." The sPzAbt 501 reported that this was plenty to keep up with lighter tanks. British infantry tanks and cruiser tanks were prescribed march speeds of respectively 7.5 mph (12.1 km/h) and 12.5 mph (20.1 km/h); British wheeled vehicles were instructed to average 15 mph (24 km/h) on road marches. Tiger crews report that typical march speed off-road was 10 km/h (6.2 mph).

The Tiger was least reliable at its introduction, due to issues with the Maybach HL 210 TRM P45 engine, leaking seals and gaskets, and improperly sized brakes, exacerbated by rushed assembly, operational tempo, and missing service and support. Over time, however, reliability improved as these issues were addressed.

On 3 February 1943, the engineer of the sPzAbt 501 reported that the problems affecting their tanks were attributable to rushed assembly and sea transport, and had been resolved between 200–400 km (120–250 mi) of operation, after which the tanks were regarded as functioning correctly:

The three Tigers of the 1st Company and the two Tigers of the staff company, integrated into the Lueder group, with the exception of a single wheel replacement, have successfully completed operations without any problems. Since all these tanks have covered an average of 700 km (430 mi), it reinforces the assumption that the new Tigers, once the aforementioned problems—undoubtedly due to manufacturing and assembly defects—have been resolved, are functioning correctly.

For each of the Eilbote operations (18 to 24 January; 31 January to 2 February), the Tigers fought along at least 63 mi (101 km) of hilly, muddy roads to reach their ultimate objective, ignoring the tactical manoeuvres and the roundtrips for replenishment and repairs. After returning from the first Operation Eilbote, the commander of the sPzAbt 501 reported:

The Tigers have proven to be outstanding even during marches and combat in the mountains. However, they now need a complete overhaul and inspection. The fact that only one Tiger out of nine [starters] was still fully operational and two or three others were conditionally operational at the end of the operation should not be disregarded. The time it will take to repair them will be governed by the possibility of performing the work needed. The difficult towing required, the necessary dispersal of the workshop and repair sections, as well as the hauling of repair parts, require rapid shipment of the still missing elements of the workshop company and supply column of the battalion to Tunisia.

The first production series Tiger Fgst Nr 250001 with Motor Nr 46052 was only run-in for 25 km (16 mi) by Henschel before being sent to Kummersdorf for testing. During a test drive on 28 May 1942, with only 52 km (32 mi) on the odometer, a blockage occurred in the steering gear. This Tiger quickly went through the original and two replacement engines (Motor Nr 46051 from 1 to 3 July, Motor Nr 46065 from 6 to 8 July) and was fitted with a fourth motor, Nr 46066, after 13 July. By 3 August 1942, this Tiger had covered a total of 1,046 km (650 mi) by 31 March 1943 a total of 5,623 km (3,494 mi) and by 31 July 1943 a total of 7,736 km (4,807 mi).These figures clearly demonstrate that once the Tiger had overcome its teething troubles, it could withstand a lot of purposefully administered abuse during test programmes.

The sPzAbt 501 noted the following in Technical Report No. 6 dated 3 May 1943:

A striking aspect of recent operations is the fact that, after marches of 400 km (250 mi), it has been possible to operate Tiger tanks in combat. While it is true that, following these operations, the Tigers that had not been completely knocked out were unable to leave the operational area under their own power and had to be towed, it can be confirmed that Tigers are now capable of marching alongside lighter tanks at speeds previously thought impossible.

It remains to be seen whether, after marches exceeding 300 km (190 mi) and if sufficient time were available for a technical overhaul, the Tiger would withstand subsequent operations. Since a march like the one mentioned above has not been repeated in coordination with subsequent operations, no prediction can be made in this regard.

Regarding engine overheating, it can be observed that in recent times the Maybach HL 210 engine no longer causes virtually any technical difficulties, and that engine failures are mostly caused by drivers, who are no longer the best (insufficient training). In some cases, the reason lies in the lack of a remote temperature gauge.

Five engines have covered a distance of 3,000 km (1,900 mi) without major breakdowns.

By February 1943, the Tiger companies in Tunisia and Russia were using Panzer IIIs, Panzer IVs, and Tigers at the same time. The Tiger company of Panzerregiment Grossdeutschland undertook its most demanding operation so far on 7-19 March, after which it reported as follows:

With the exception of known childhood diseases, the Pz.Kpfw. VI has proven itself to be good. Already, it can be said that its reliability is superior to the Pz.Kpfw.III and IV. When routine care and maintenance are accomplished (that means one day for maintenance for three days in action), even the way it is now, the Tiger can achieve exceptional success.

These demands were no greater than for other tanks. On 1 April 1943, the British 25th Tank Brigade prescribed one hour of maintenance in every eight hours of marching, at a maximum speed that would allow only 42 mi (68 km) in that period. It estimated 2.5 hours of replenishment and maintenance at the end of every operational day, and prescribed one day of maintenance after three days of operation.

Otto Carius (who commanded 2nd Company, 502nd Battalion) told an interviewer: "I have no complaints about the Tiger … Maintenance of the Tiger presented no problem for us … Most of our breakdowns were due to damaged running gear". A separate German veteran told a historian, "Tiger was not a lady, but she was like a good woman. If you treated her right, she’d treat you right."

A memorandum dated 3 May 1944 indicates that transmission failures had become a problem and were attributed to manufacturing defects rather than flaws in the transmission's design:

Memorandum on the topics discussed during the meeting of the Tank Committee under the chairmanship of Dr. Blaicher on 2 May 1944: Both WaPrüf 6 and Henschel are of the opinion that the problems with the Olvar-B transmission are manufacturing problems and not design problems. Most of the breakdowns occur in the gearbox.

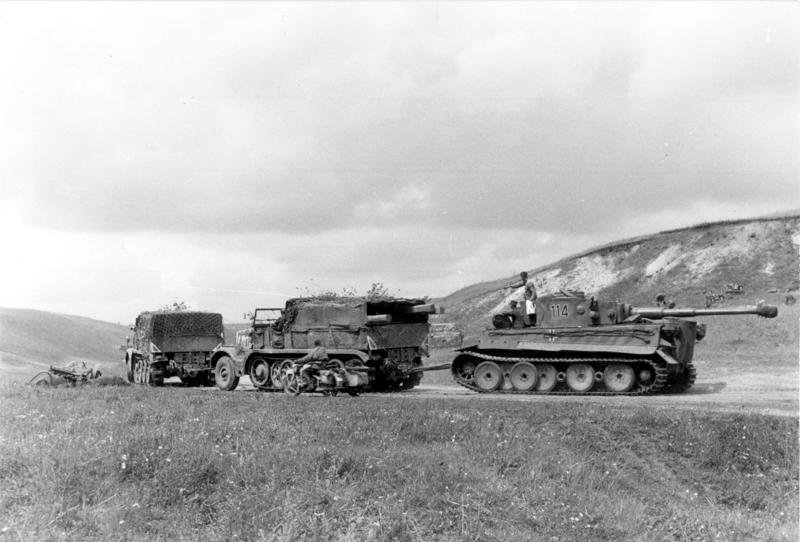
Tiger I towed by two Sd.Kfz. 9

Tiger I tanks needed a high degree of support. It required two or sometimes three of the standard German Sd.Kfz. 9 Famo heavy recovery half-track tractors to tow it. However, due to shortages of these recovery vehicles, Tiger crews were often forced to use another Tiger to tow disabled tanks, even though this practice was officially forbidden, as it frequently resulted in rapid mechanical wear and breakdowns, with the typical damage being thrown tracks, damaged sprockets, bent suspension arms, and engine overheating. The low-mounted sprocket limited the obstacle clearance height. The tracks also had a tendency to override the rear sprocket, resulting in immobilisation. If a track overrode and jammed, two Tigers were normally needed to tow the tank. The jammed track was also a big problem itself, since due to high tension, it was often impossible to split the track by removing the track pins. The track sometimes had to be blown apart with a small explosive charge.

According to armor researcher Bruce Newsome, Tiger units were usually deployed without their requisite service and support, as Germany's strategic problem was expressed as operational overstretch, which prevented maintenance for days and hundreds of km. For instance, on 15 January 1944, sPzAbt 506 complained that it had been operating without maintenance constantly for 14 days and between 250 km (160 mi) and 340 km (210 mi).

The average readiness rates of the Tiger tank in the second half of 1943 was similar to that of the Panther, 36%, compared to the 48% of the Panzer IV and the 65% of the StuG III. From May 1944 to March 1945, the readiness rates of the Tiger tank was comparable to the Panzer IV. With an average of 70%, the Tiger's operational availability on the Western Front was better than that of Panthers, at 62%. On the Eastern Front, 65% of Tigers were operationally available, compared to the 71% of Panzer IVs and 65% of Panthers.

As a factor contributing to the generally lower readiness rates of German armoured units compared with Allied armoured units, German authors have pointed out that German units would appear to hold a higher proportion of unready tanks and to require more time to repair tanks given that they were responsible for almost all repairs, and were unwilling to write-off or return tanks to echelons that might issue them elsewhere. Units carried broken tanks in the hope of a lull that never came, while Allied units sent most repairs to higher echelons and were more willing to classify tanks as total losses.

=== Tactical organization ===
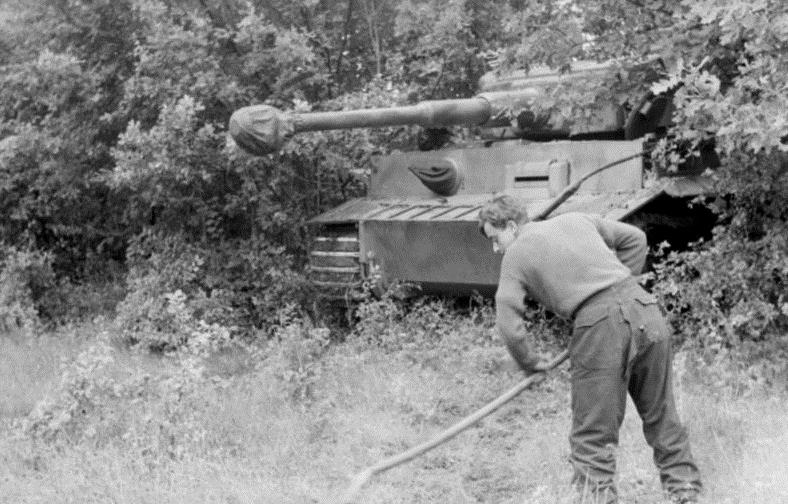
A Tiger I camouflaged in a static defensive position

Tigers were usually employed in separate heavy tank battalions (schwere Panzer-Abteilung) under army command. These battalions would be deployed to critical sectors, either for breakthrough operations or, more typically, counter-attacks. A few favoured divisions, such as the Grossdeutschland, and the 1st SS Leibstandarte Adolf Hitler, 2nd SS Das Reich, and 3rd SS Totenkopf Panzergrenadier Divisions at Kursk, had a Tiger company in their tank regiments. The Grossdeutschland Division had its Tiger company increased to a battalion as the III Panzer Battalion of the Panzer Regiment Grossdeutschland. 3rd SS Totenkopf retained its Tiger I company through the entire war. 1st SS and 2nd SS had their Tiger companies taken away and incorporated into the 101st SS Tiger Battalion, which was part of 1st SS Panzer Corps.

The Tiger was originally designed to be an offensive breakthrough weapon, but by the time it went into action, the military situation had changed dramatically, and its main use was on the defensive, as a mobile anti-tank and infantry gun support weapon. Tactically, this also meant moving the Tiger units constantly to parry breakthroughs, causing excessive mechanical wear. As a result, Tiger battalions rarely entered combat at full strength.

== Allied response ==
=== British response ===
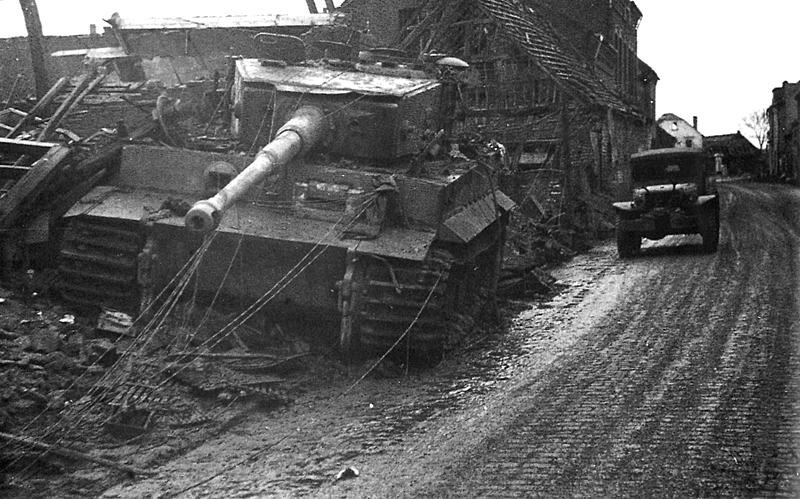
Tiger I that knocked out the first M26 Pershing in combat. It then backed into a pile of rubble and became stuck, leading to the crew abandoning it.

The British had observed the gradual increase in German AFV armour and firepower since 1940 and had anticipated the need for more powerful anti-tank guns. Work on the 76.2 mm calibre Ordnance QF 17 pounder had begun in late 1940 and in 1942 100 early-production guns were rushed to North Africa to help counter the new Tiger threat. The gun carriage had not yet been developed, and the guns were mounted on the carriages of 25-pounder gun-howitzers and were known by the code name "Pheasant".

Efforts were hastened to get cruiser tanks armed with 17-pounder guns into operation. The Cruiser Mk VIII Challenger (A30) was already at the prototype stage in 1942, but this tank had relatively weaker armor with a front hull thickness of 64 mm. In the end, it was produced and deployed in limited numbers (around 200 were ordered in 1943), though crews liked it for its high speed. The extemporised Sherman Firefly, armed with the 17-pounder, proved to be an excellent anti-tank weapon, but the gun lacked general-purpose capability until later in the war. Fireflies were successfully used against Tigers; in one engagement, a single Firefly destroyed three Tigers in 12 minutes with five rounds. Sherman Fireflies were deployed one per troop of four 75mm armed standard Shermans. The Germans learned to target Fireflies, so the gun barrel of the Firefly was painted to disguise its length, resembling the M3 75mm gun. This was partially effective. Over 2,000 Fireflies were built during the war. Five different 17-pounder-armed British designs saw combat during the war: the Challenger, the A34 Comet (using the related QF 77mm HV), the Sherman Firefly, the 17pdr SP Achilles (up-gunned M10 GMC), and the 17pdr SP Archer self-propelled gun, while one more, the A41 Centurion, was about to enter service as the European war ended. In 1944 the British introduced an APDS round for the 17-pounder, which increased penetration performance considerably.

=== Soviet response ===
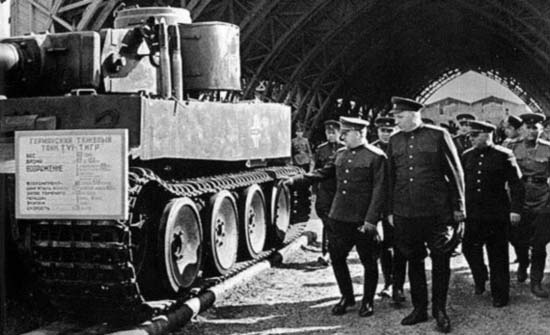
Marshal Georgy Zhukov inspecting a Tiger captured by the Red Army in 1943

The first Tiger tank was captured by Soviet troops in January 1943 on the Volkhov Front.

Initially, the Soviets responded to the Tiger I by restarting production of the 57 mm ZiS-2 anti-tank gun (production was stopped in 1941 in favour of cheaper and more versatile alternatives – e.g. the ZiS-3 – as the gun's performance was excessive for early German armour). The ZiS-2 had better armour penetration than the 76 mm F-34 tank gun used by most Red Army tanks, or the ZiS-3 76 mm divisional cannon, but was still inadequate against Tigers. A small number of T-34s were again fitted with a tank version of the ZiS-2, the ZiS-4, but it could not fire an adequate high-explosive round, making it an unsuitable tank gun.

Firing trials of the new 85 mm D-5T also had proved disappointing. Several captured German Tiger I tanks were shipped to Chelyabinsk, where they were subjected to 85 mm fire from various angles. The 85 mm gun could not reliably penetrate the Tiger I's armour except at ranges within the lethal envelope of the Tiger I's own 88 mm gun. It was still initially used on the SU-85 self-propelled gun (based on a T-34 chassis) from August 1943. The production of KV heavy tanks armed with the 85 mm D-5T in an IS-85 turret was also started. There was a short production run of 148 KV-85 tanks, which were sent to the front beginning in September 1943 with production ending by December 1943. By early 1944, the T-34/85 appeared; this up-gunned T-34 matched the SU-85's firepower, but with the advantage of mounting the gun in a turret. It also matched the firepower of the heavier IS-85 tank in a more cost-effective package, resulting in a repetition of the events which heralded the decline of KV-1 production. The IS was subsequently rearmed with the 122 mm D-25T, which with BR–471 AP rounds was capable of punching through the Tiger's armour from 1,200 m, and with the improved BR–471B APHEBC rounds at over 2,000 m. (Note: The Br-471B projectile was ordered in early 1945, but arrived too late to be issued for combat in Europe.) The redundant SU-85 was replaced by the SU-100, mounting a 100 mm D-10 tank gun, that could penetrate 149 mm of vertical armour plate at 1,000 m.

In May 1943, the Red Army deployed the SU-152, which was replaced in 1944 by the ISU-152. Both these self-propelled guns mounted the large 152 mm howitzer-gun. The SU-152 was intended to be a close-support gun for use against German fortifications rather than armour; however, it shared with the later fielded ISU-152 the nickname Zveroboy ("beast killer") for its rare ability to knock out German heavy tanks. The 152 mm armour-piercing shells weighed over 45 kilograms (99 lb) and could penetrate a Tiger's frontal armour from about 1,000 metres (1,100 yd). Its high-explosive rounds would destroy anything that was attached to the outside of the tank, and had a knack for immobilizing any tank it hit. The sheer force of the shell meant that at certain points it could knock off the turrets of the Tiger series. However, the size and weight of the ammunition meant both vehicles had a low rate of fire.

=== US response ===
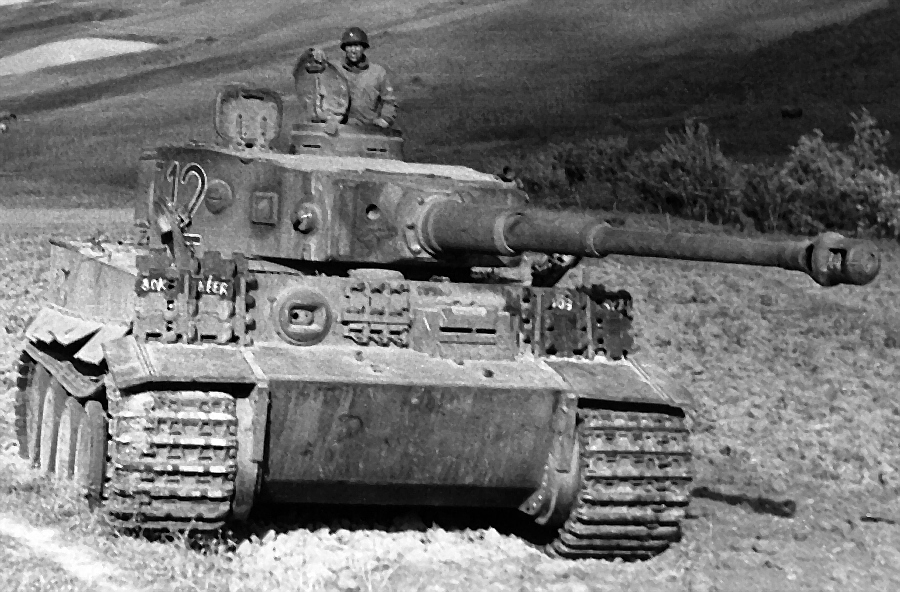
Tiger 712 captured by US forces in Tunis, 1943.

As early as 1942, the US planned and tested the rearming of the M4 Sherman with the 76 mm M1 gun, expecting to encounter heavier German armor later in the war. However, the US Army hesitated to do so, as combat through early 1944 indicated that the 75 mm M3 was more than adequate for handling the German tank threat. This conclusion was partly based on the correct estimate that Tigers would be encountered in relatively small numbers, and on the assumption that anti-tank gun-fire (as in Tunisia and Sicily) rather than tanks could knock them out.

== Operators ==
- Germany – main operator
- Hungary – 13-15 examples given by Germany in 1944 to the First Hungarian Army fighting under German command on the Eastern Front. A lack of repair capabilities led to the destruction of most of the tanks. 3 damaged Tigers were sent back to Germany.

Captured:

- France – used captured Tigers in the Saint Nazaire salient and the Allied offensive into Germany
- Romania – two (lacking fuel) captured in August 1944 after King Michael's Coup, but were immediately confiscated by the Soviets.

== Surviving vehicles ==
=== Running ===
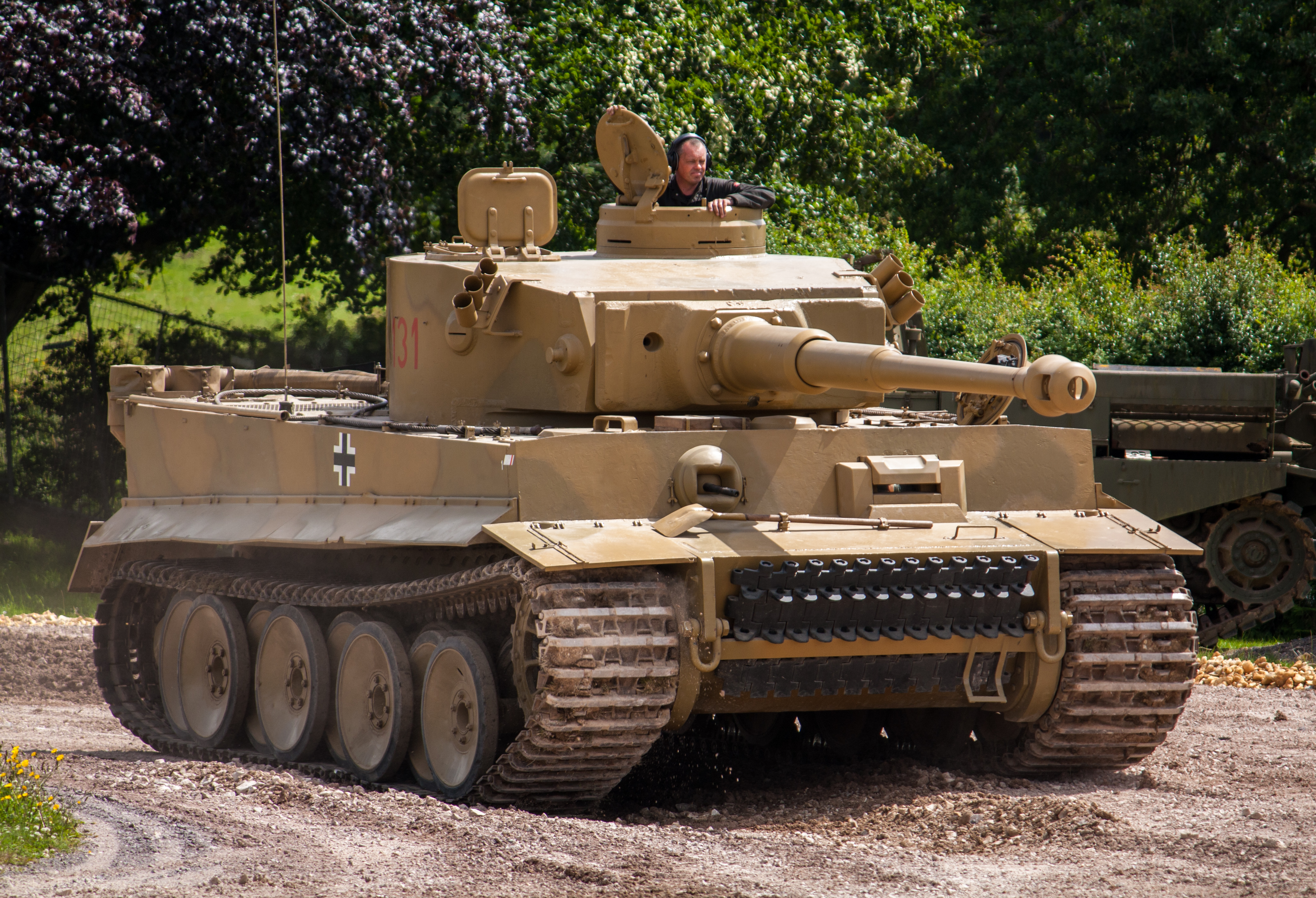
Tiger 131, Bovington Tank Museum, United Kingdom

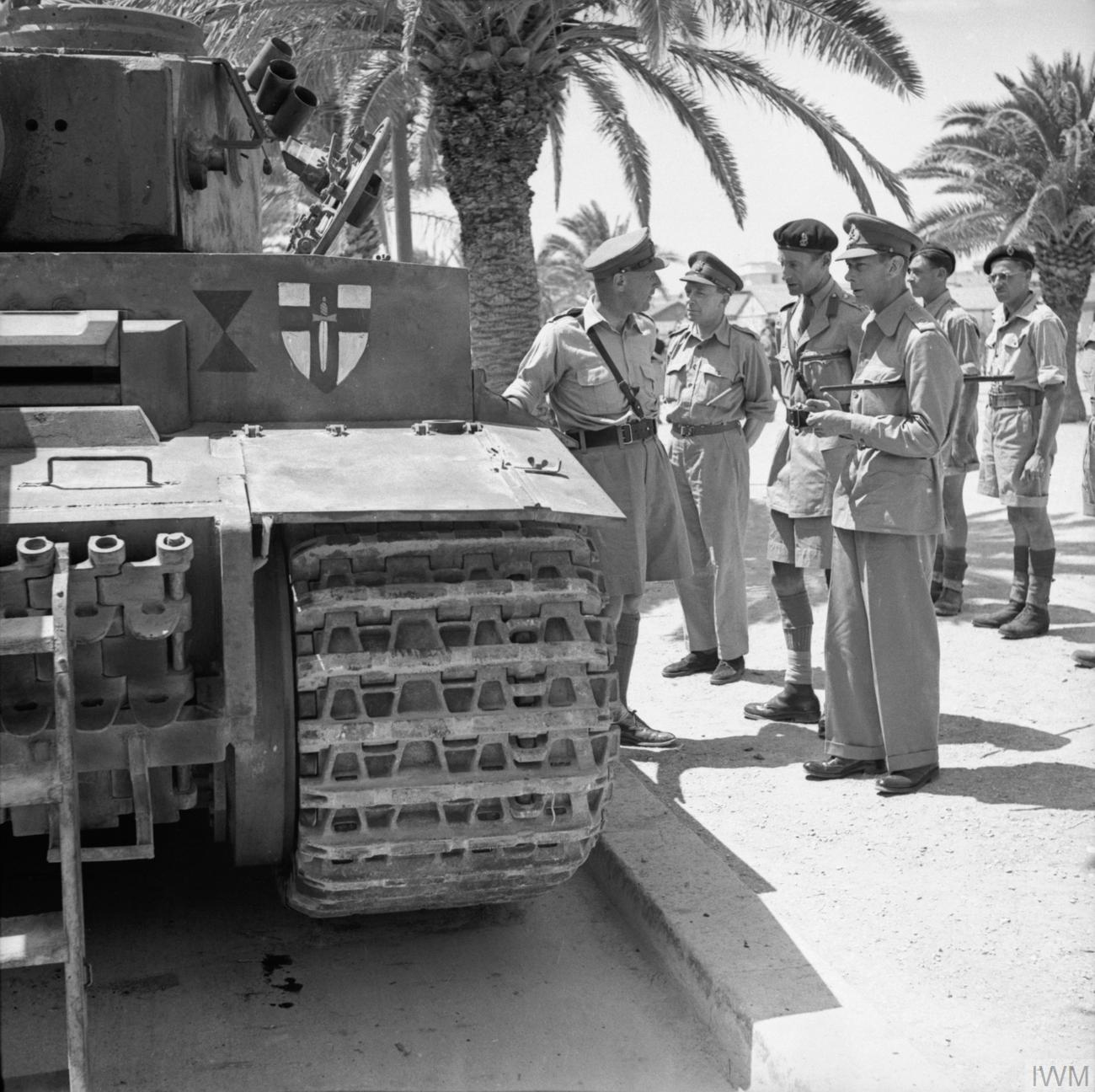
King George VI inspecting Tiger 131 in Tunis, June 1943. The badge of the British First Army had been painted onto the tank.

On 24 April 1943, a Tiger I of the 504th German heavy tank battalion, with turret number 131, was captured at Point 174 (Gueriat el Atach) in Tunisia. Earlier accounts stated that the tank had been disabled at Djebel Djaffa on 21 April 1943 by 6-pounder solid shot fired from a Churchill tank of the British 48th Royal Tank Regiment, which ricocheted from the Tiger's gun barrel into the turret ring, jamming the turret traverse and forcing the crew to abandon the vehicle. However, research published by The Tank Museum in 2019 concluded that Tiger 131 was actually disabled three days later, on 24 April 1943, at Point 174 (Gueriat el Atach) during fighting involving the 2nd Battalion Sherwood Foresters and supporting Churchill tanks. The turret was jammed by a 6-pounder round fired from one of the supporting Churchill tanks, (Note: The damage that immobilized the turret can still be observed.) causing the crew to abandon the vehicle, which was subsequently captured by British forces. After repairs, the tank was sent to England for a thorough inspection.

The captured tank was officially handed over to the Bovington Tank Museum by the British Ministry of Supply on 25 September 1951. In June 1990, the tank was removed from display at the museum and work began on its restoration. This was carried out both by the museum and the Army Base Repair Organisation and involved an almost complete disassembly of the tank. The Maybach HL230 engine from the museum's Tiger II was installed (the Tiger's original Maybach HL210 had been sectioned for display), along with a modern fire-suppressant system in the engine compartment. In December 2003, Tiger 131 returned to the museum, restored and in running condition. Tiger 131 was used in the film Fury, the first time an original, fully mechanically operable Tiger I appeared in a movie since World War II. The fire suppression system was removed as it interfered with engine maintenance and was too obtrusive.

=== Others ===
Given the low number of just over 1,300 Tiger Is produced during World War II, very few survived the war and the subsequent post-war scrapping drives. According to the memoirs of the veterans of the Kubinka training ground, dozens of captured Tigers were used in the USSR as targets in the 50s, and then were sent to the Stalingrad plant for smelting. The Tiger, preserved in the Lenino-Snegiri Museum, was used as a target at the Nakhabino engineering range and survived. Many large components have been salvaged over the years, but the discovery of a more or less and generally complete vehicle has so far eluded armour enthusiasts and tank collectors. In addition to Tiger 131, nine other Tiger I tanks survive:

- Musée des Blindés in Saumur, France. Indoor exhibit in good condition. Mid-production (1944) version with overlapping 'steel'-type roadwheels adopted from the Tiger II and fitted with the narrow transport tracks. This Tiger was part of the 2nd company of the SS Heavy Panzer Battalion 102 which fought in the Cauville sector and was later abandoned by her crew after a mechanical breakdown. She was recommissioned as Colmar with the 2nd squadron of the Free French 6th Cuirassier Regiment and joined the new unit in fighting all the way back to Germany. In late 2023, the museum initiated a crowdfunding campaign to restore it to running status. As the crowdfunding campaign was successful, the tank is now, as of early 2024, under restoration by the museum and is expected to return to running status soon.In September 2026, the fully refurbished engine has been installed in the tank, which is now fully operational.
- Vimoutiers in Normandy, France. The renowned "Vimoutiers Tiger tank". Abandoned and then destroyed (to prevent enemy capture) by its German crew in August 1944. An outdoor monument in poor condition due to the effect of time and the elements (many original parts such as hatches and both rear exhaust pipes missing).
- Kubinka Tank Museum in Moscow, Russia. In good condition; displayed as an indoor exhibit (although the outermost row of four roadwheels is missing on this vehicle).
- Military-Historical Museum of Lenino-Snegiri in Russia. In very bad condition; displayed outdoors. This tank was a former Nakhabino firing-range target in and has been badly shot-at and cut up (damage includes broken running gear and multiple shell-holes in its armour). The tank received additional damage during improper transportation from Moscow to Saratov on the Volga and back, losing some of its parts. Saved pictures of the condition before it was transported.
- Tiger 712 (hull number 250031) of the 501st Heavy Panzer Battalion was captured in North Africa in May 1943 and is a part of the United States Army Armor & Cavalry Collection, Fort Benning, Georgia. In good condition; formerly displayed outdoors, it has since been moved indoors. This vehicle had its left turret and upper-hull sides partially cutaway in 1946 for instructional and display purposes.
- Mr Hoebig, a private collector – Long Island, New York, United States. The "Hoebig Tiger" (marked as 231) is a Tiger reconstructed by Hoebig from various components sourced from the Trun Scrapyard in Normandy, with the wheels and gun coming from Kurland (in Latvia). Prior to December 2016, it was on display at the German Panzer Museum in Munster.
- "Hoebig Second Tiger". Put together from a Russian scrapped chassis and various other found parts. This is non-running late model Tiger, the second built by Hoebig, construction starting in 2012. It was first displayed at Militracks in 2023.
- Australian Armour and Artillery Museum. This Tiger, restored in 2021, is an externally complete Tiger using battlefield relics and a proportionally small amount of replica plate/components, similar to the Hoebig Tigers and Wheatcroft Tigers.
- The Wheatcroft Collection. Has a significant number of components to assemble three Tigers -two runners, one static- made from a mixture of new replacement and original Tiger pieces. Project details of this well advanced project are as of 2026 continuously updated on their official Facebook page. Kevin Wheatcroft has maintained that the restorations would use 100% original components and parts; however, photos obtained within "the secure zone" (Wheatcroft safe storage and workshop facility) show clearly that more than 60% of the upper deck and the entire engine area have been fabricated from new materials.
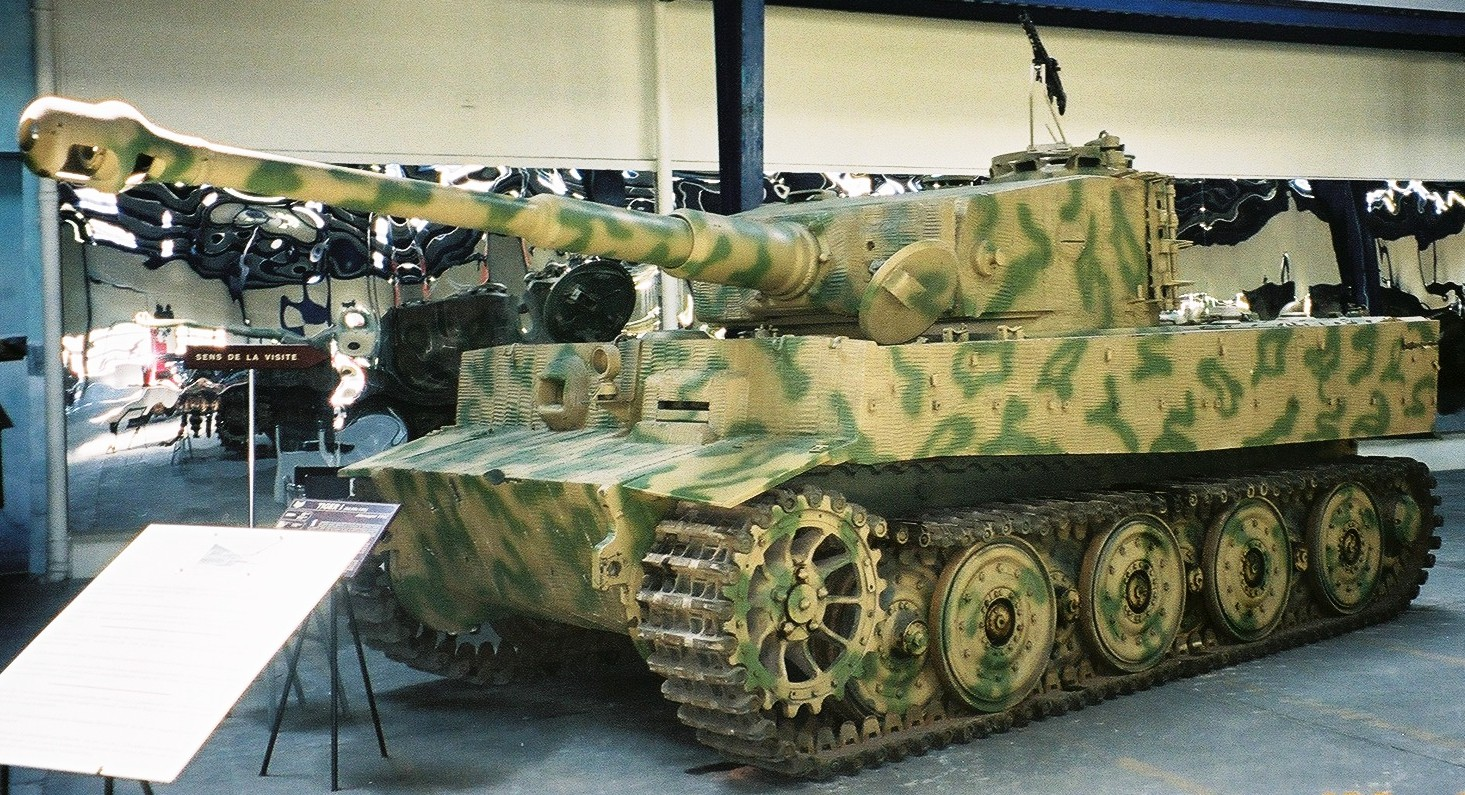
Tiger Colmar in the Musée des Blindés in Saumur, France

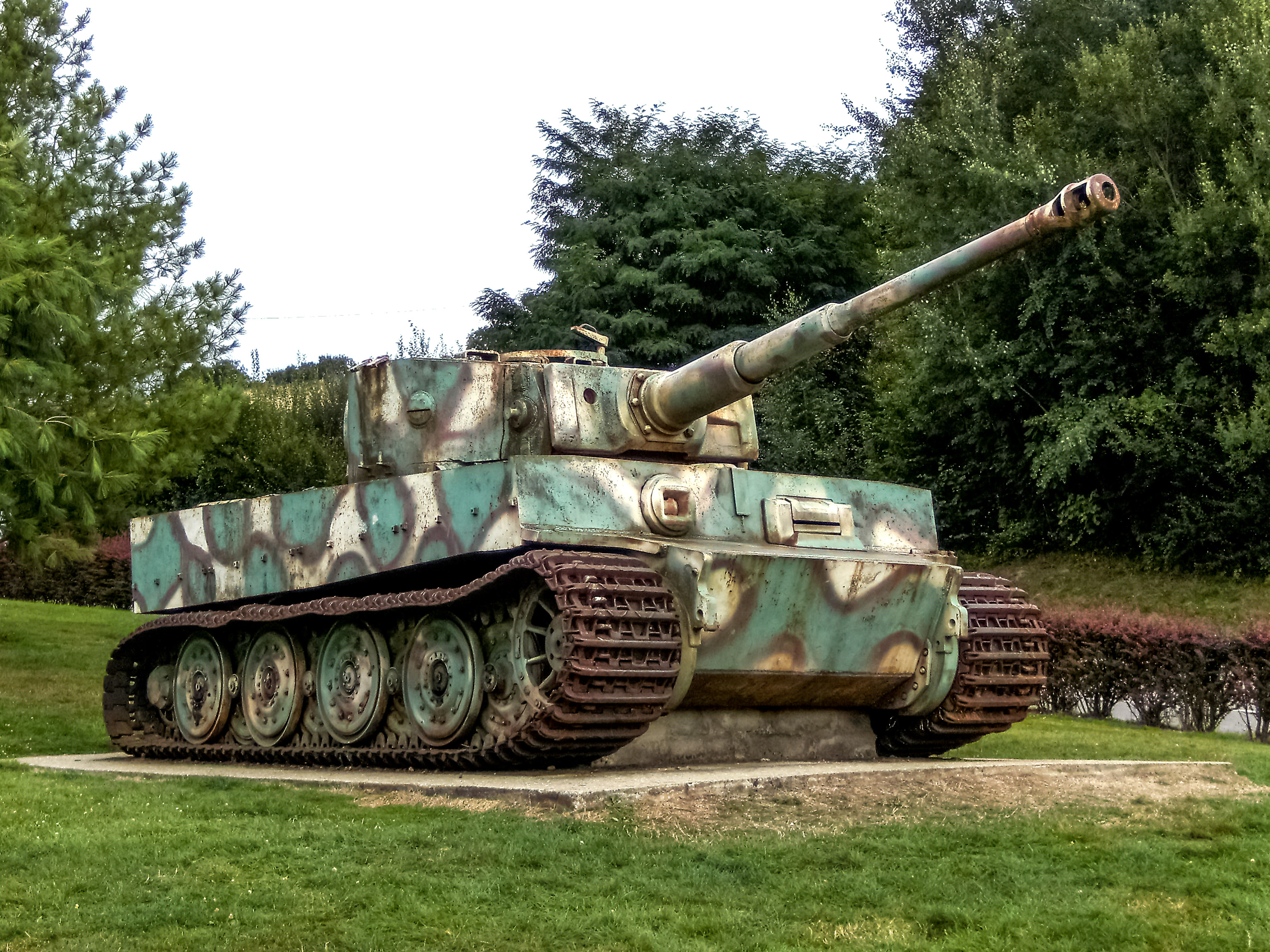
The Vimoutiers Tiger tank in Vimoutiers in Normandy, France

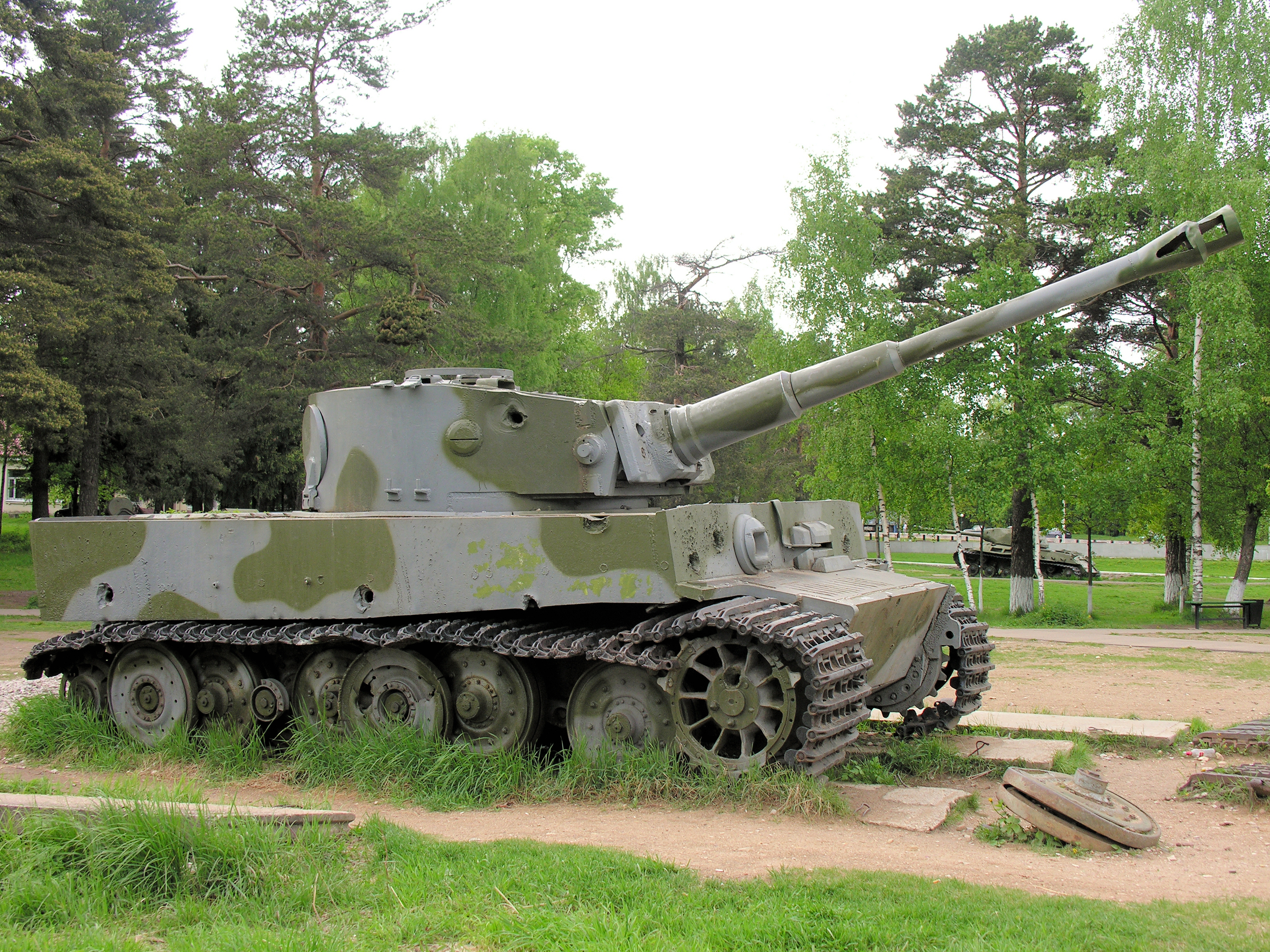
Badly damaged Tiger on display in the Lenino-Snegiri Military-Historical Museum, Russia

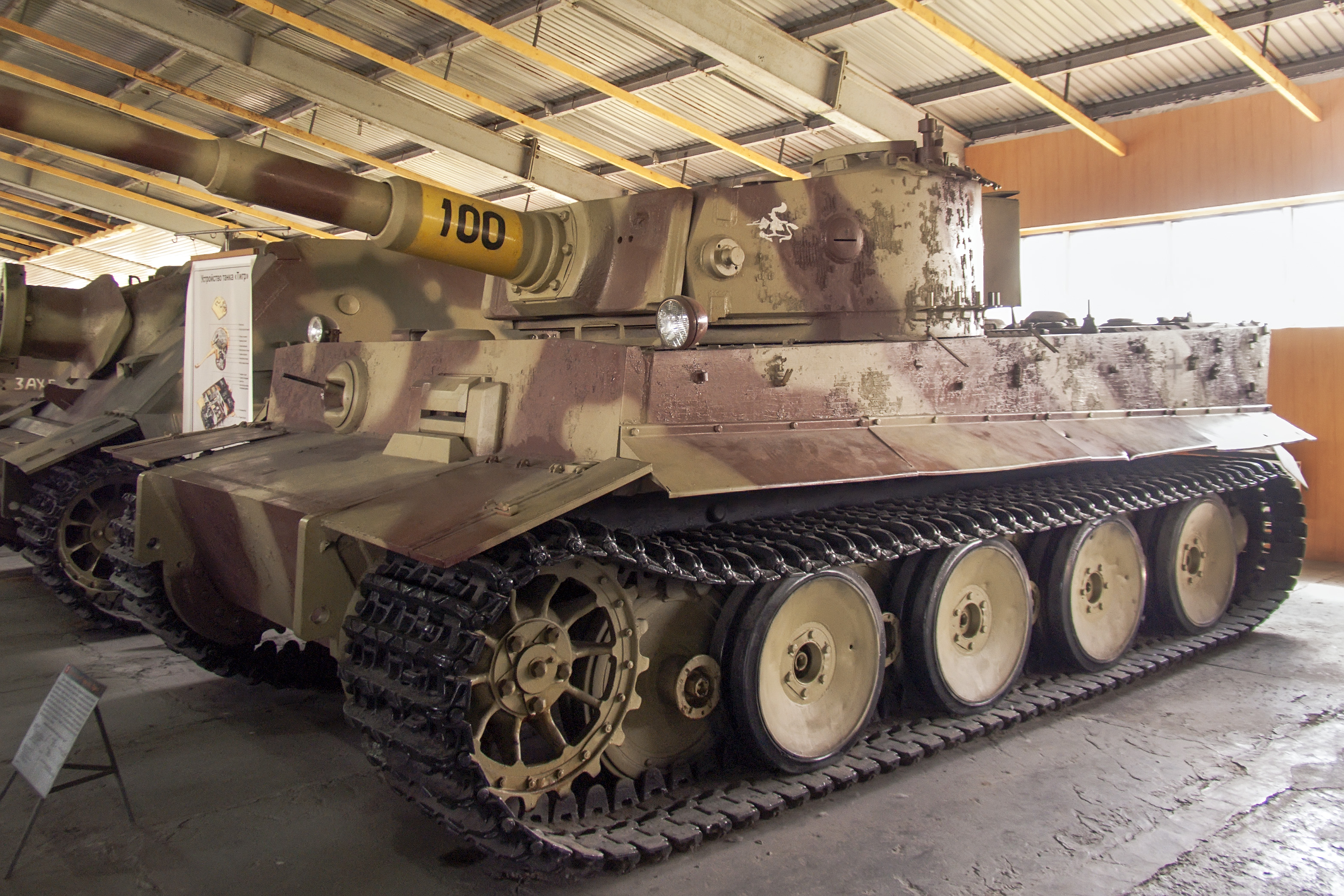
In Kubinka Tank Museum, Russia

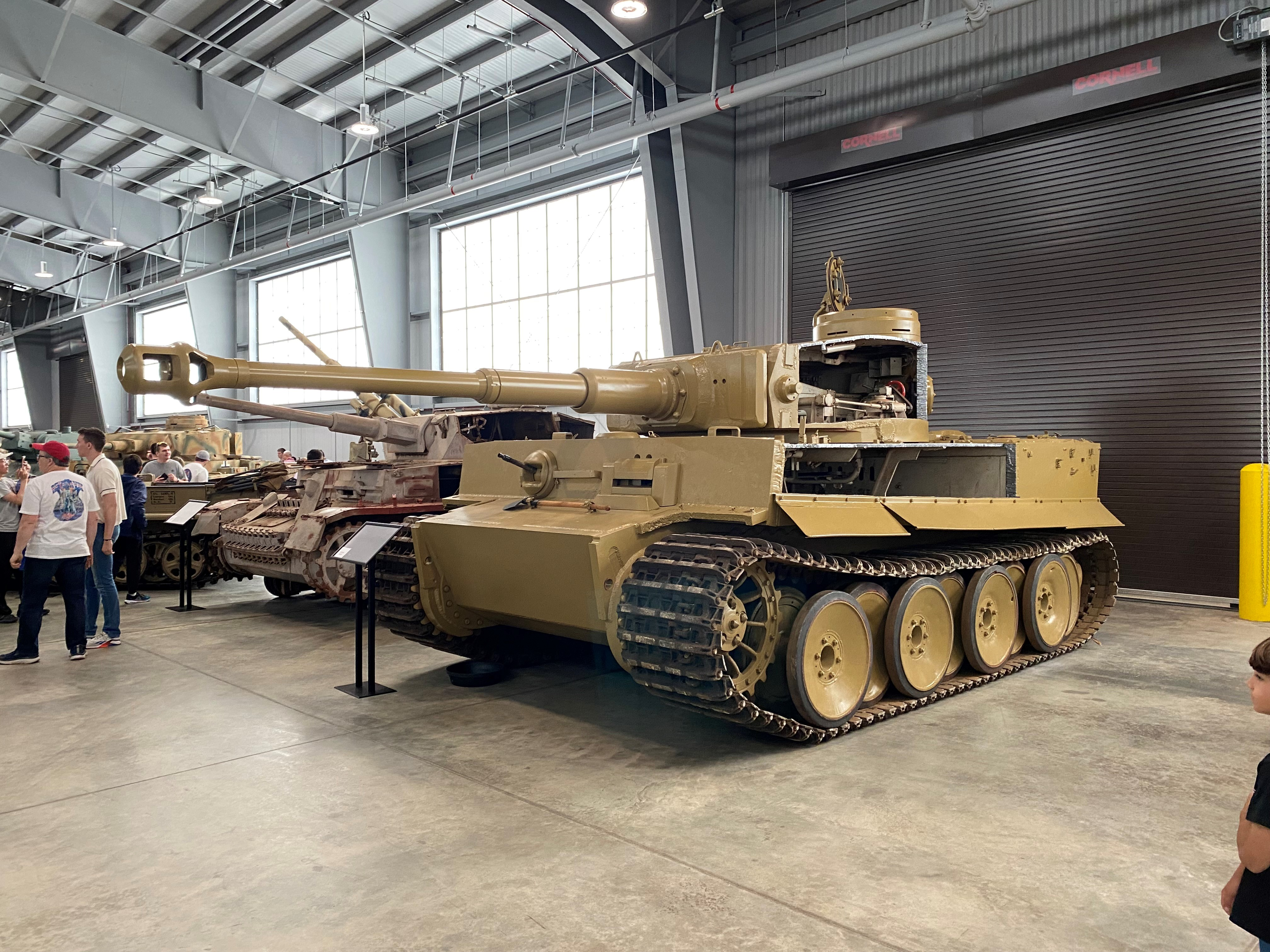
Tiger 712 on display at the U.S. Army Armor & Cavalry Collection, Fort Benning, Georgia, showing the cutaway sections of the left hull and turret.

== Tanks of comparable role, performance and era ==
- Soviet KV-1 and IS-2
- American M26 Pershing and M4A3E2 Sherman assault tank
- British Churchill tank

== See also ==
- List of WWII Maybach engines
- Grosstraktor
