= Tigerfibel =

Tiger tank manual

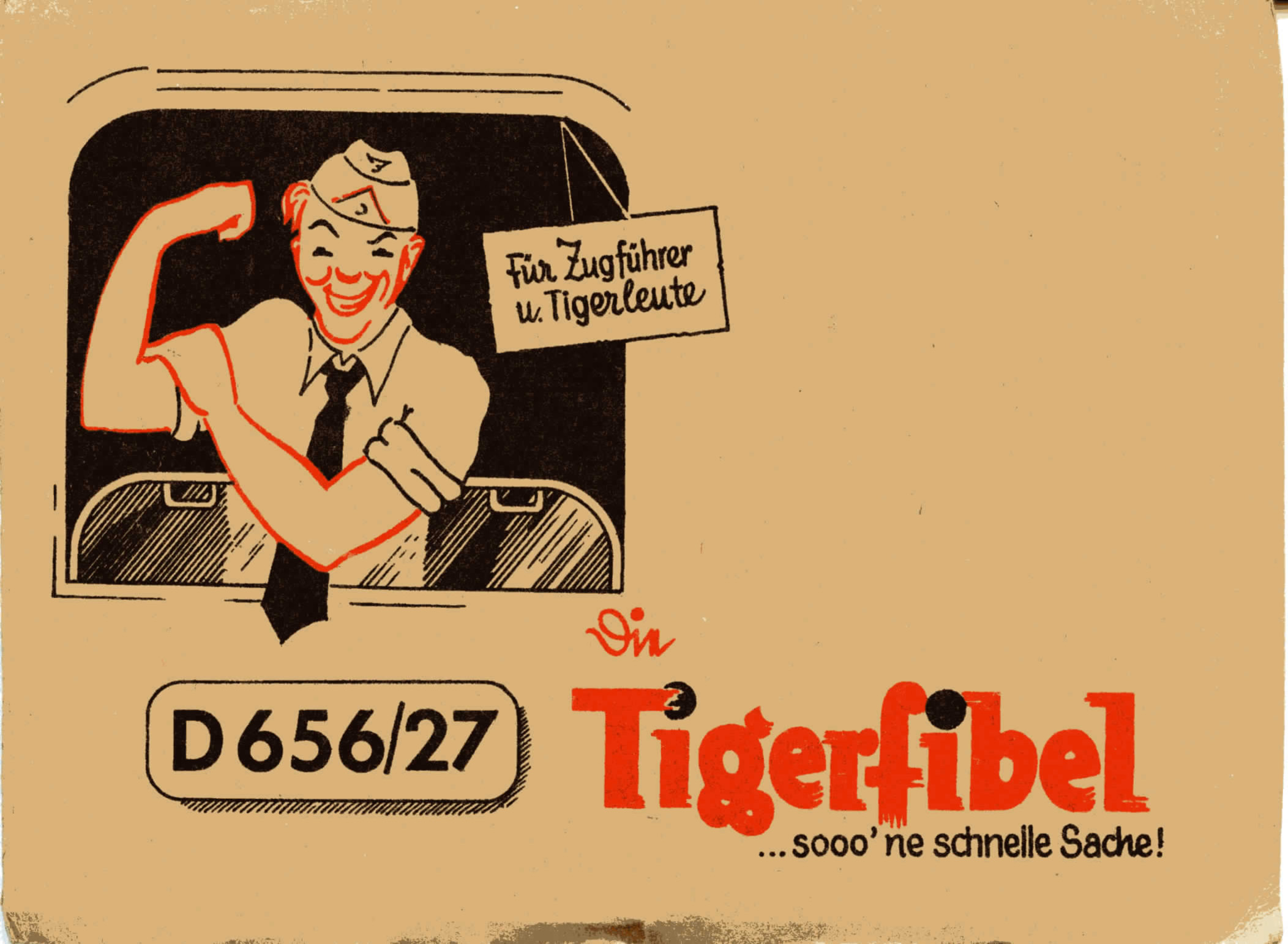
Cover of the Tigerfibel tank manual published during WWII in Germany

The Tigerfibel and Pantherfibel were crew instruction manuals for the German tanks of World War II, the Panzer VI Tiger heavy tank and the Panzer V Panther medium tank.

Like other manuals designated as Fibel (basic primer), they summarised what the crew needed to know for day-to-day use of the tank, but unlike the typical tedious style of a German tank manual of that period, it is well illustrated in a comic style and much of the text is written as humorous poetry.

The manuals were approved by Heinz Guderian, the Inspector-General of Panzer troops. In the case of the Panther manual, he issued his approval in the manual's rhyming style, ending with the words, Die Pantherfibel ist genehmigt; wer sie nicht kennt, der wird erledigt (roughly "The Panther primer is approved; who knows it not will be removed.")

In the same manner other comic-style-manuals were published by the German forces:

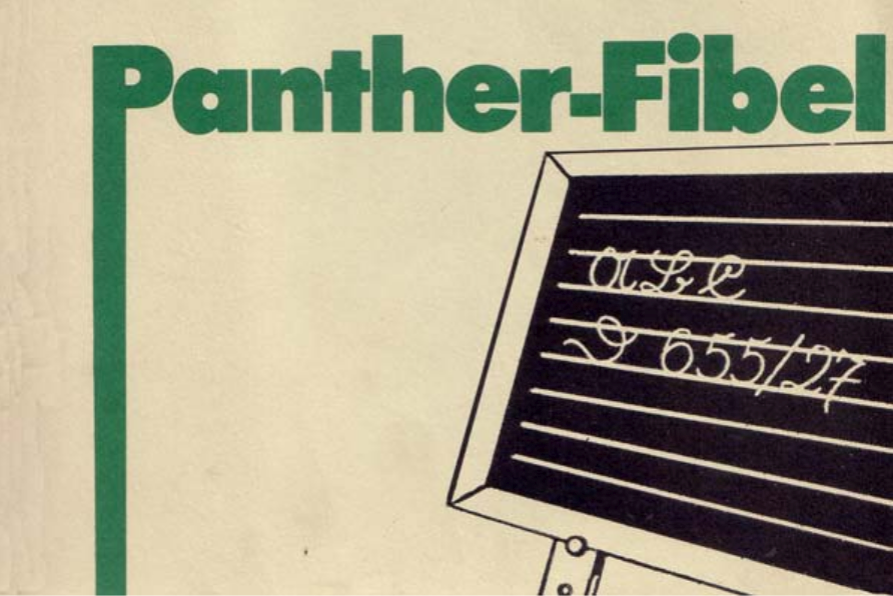
Cover of D655-27 Pantherfibel

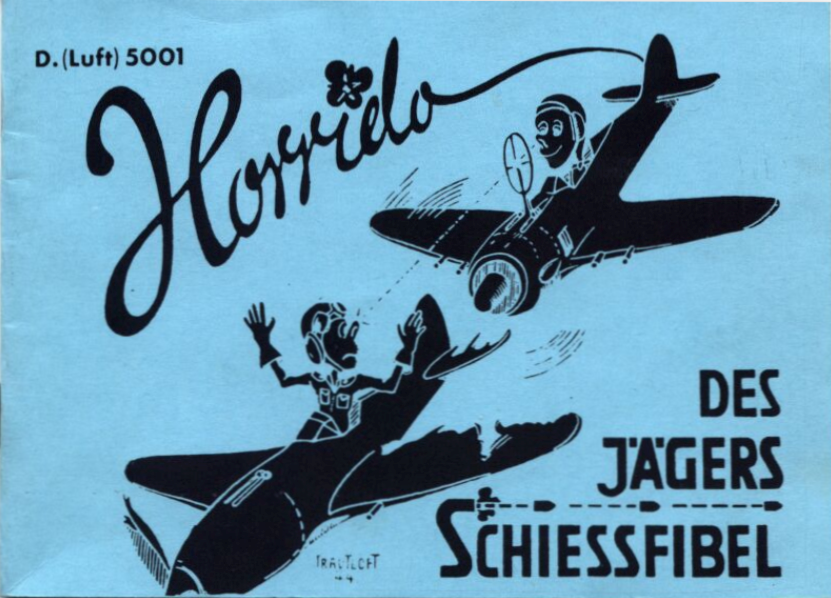
Cover of D.(Luft)5001 Horrido – Des Jägers Schiessfibel
