= Guilhèm Adèr =

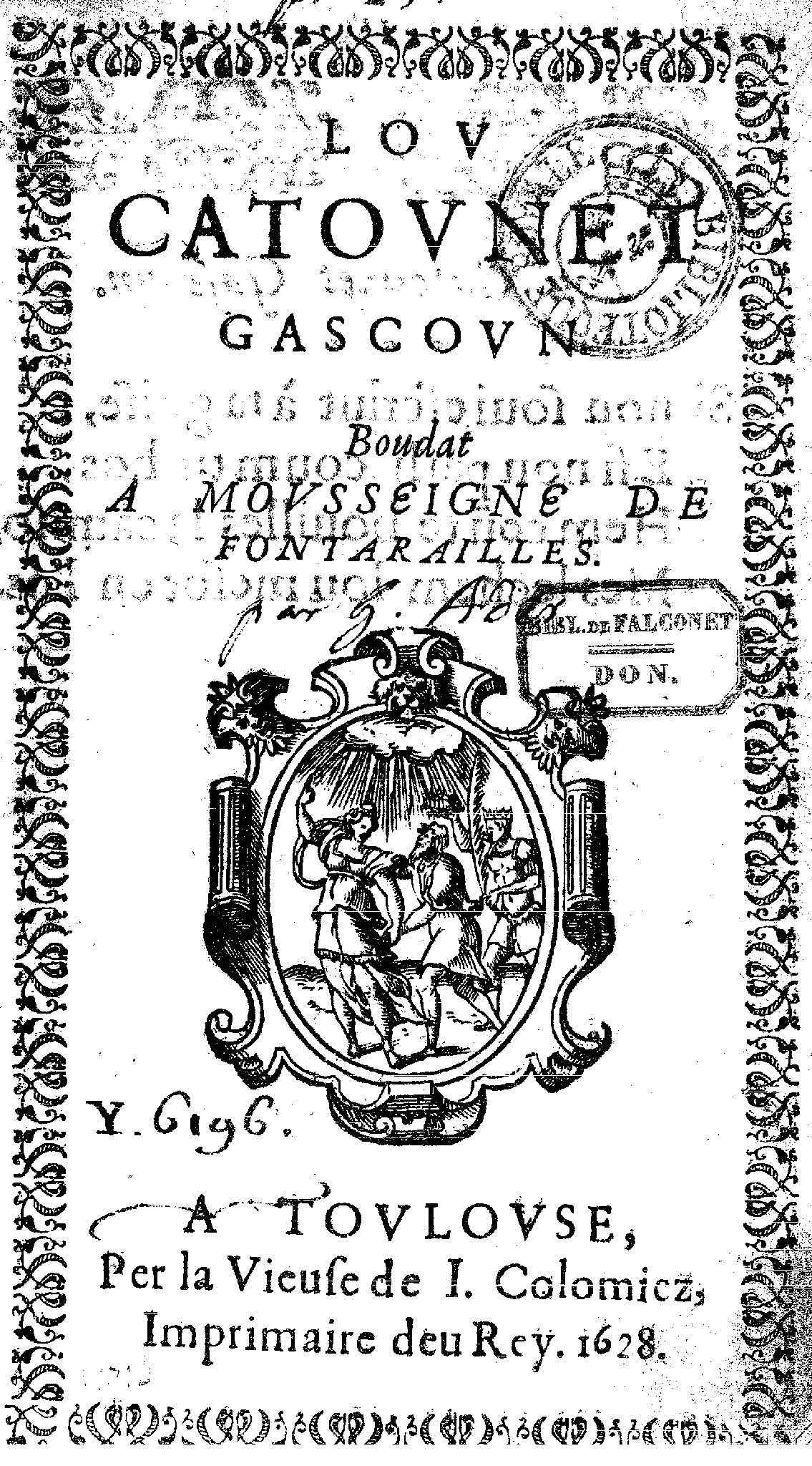

Guilhèm Adèr (in French language Guilhem Ader; Gimont ?, 1567 ? - Gimont, 1638) was an Occitan language writer from Gascony. He is the author of a book of maxims inspired by Cato (Lo Catonet Gascon) and of an epic poem dedicated to Henry III of Navarre and IV France in 2690 alexandrines.

He was born in Gimont, Gascony. He studied in Toulouse and became a physician and served in the Duc of Joyeuse's army. Afterward he returned to Gimont and settled there. He married Magdalena de Lux and they had a daughter and son.

== Bibliography ==
=== Ader's edition ===
- Jeanroy, Alfred Poésies de Guillaume Ader, publiées avec notice, traduction et Notes. Tolosa : Privat, 1904
- Adèr Guilhèm. Lo Catonet gascon. Ortès : Per Noste, 2008.
- Adèr Guilhèm. Lo gentilòme gascon. Ortès : Per Noste, 2010.

=== Critics ===
- Garavini, Fausta. La letteratura occitanica moderna. Bologna : Sansoni, 1970
- Gardy, Felip. Guilhem Ader (1567?-1638) : actes du colloque de Lombez (21-22 septembre 1991). Beziers : Centre International de Documentacion Occitana, 1992.
- Gardy, Felip, Histoire et anthologie de la littérature occitane, Tome II, l'âge du baroque - 1520 -1789. Montpellier : Presses du Languedoc, 1997.
