= Torre Ader =

Tower in Buenos Aires, Argentina

Coordinates: 34°32′02″S 58°32′42″W

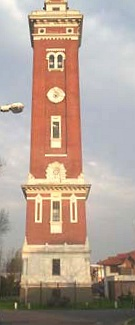
View of Torre Ader.

The Torre Ader (Ader Tower in English) is an 18th-century Florentine-style tower located in Carapachay in Vicente López Partido, Buenos Aires, Argentina. It is an historical monument built in similar style to the Torre Monumental (Monumental Tower) in Buenos Aires. It reaches a height of 42.30 m (138 ft 9 1/2 in) and has a 217-step staircase to the lookout point.

The tower was conceived in 1916 by Bernado Ader as Torre de la Independencia (Independence Tower) in honour of his deceased children and as a monument to the centenary of Argentine independence. Construction began in 1917; the architects were Artaza and Marino and the construction company was P. Stefanetti and Sons.
