= Per Noste =

Per Noste's logotype for publishing activities

Per Noste is a French association founded in 1960 under the name Per Nouste with the aim of supporting and promoting the Occitan language and civilization in Gascony. Its founding chairman is Roger Lapassade. Among the 26 founder members are Robert Darrigrand, Pierre Tucoo-Chala, and Xavier Ravier. Michel Grosclaude joined them in 1965. Since its very beginnings, the association has promoted the language teaching through the publication of handbooks.

The magazine Per Nouste was created in 1967 (its name changed to Per Noste in 1968). Its title later became País Gascons (1978).

Per Noste acted also as a local section of the IEO until 2009. Per Noste has promoted or participated in the creation of many projects linked to Occitan language revival (Calandreta, Nadau, Ràdio País, Ostau Bearnés in Pau…)

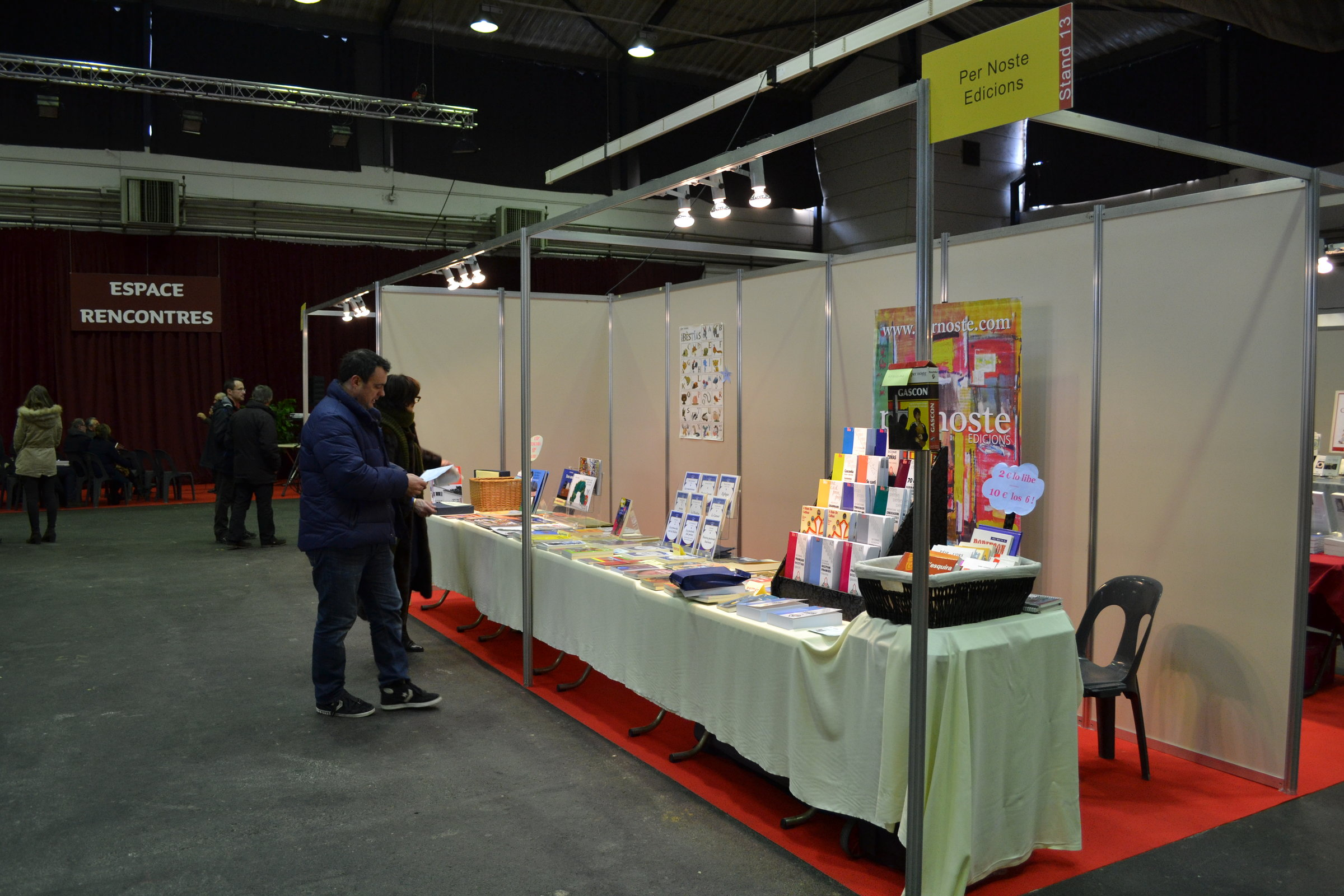
Per Noste during "Le Livre en Béarn" 2015

Its activity is mainly focused on publishing books in the Occitan language of Gascony, also called Gascon language, or about Gascony.
