= Erwin Aders =

German engineer

- Born: 7 March 1881; Düsseldorf, Germany
- Died: 6 January 1974 (aged 91)
- Occupation: Chief Designer For Germany's Henschel & Son

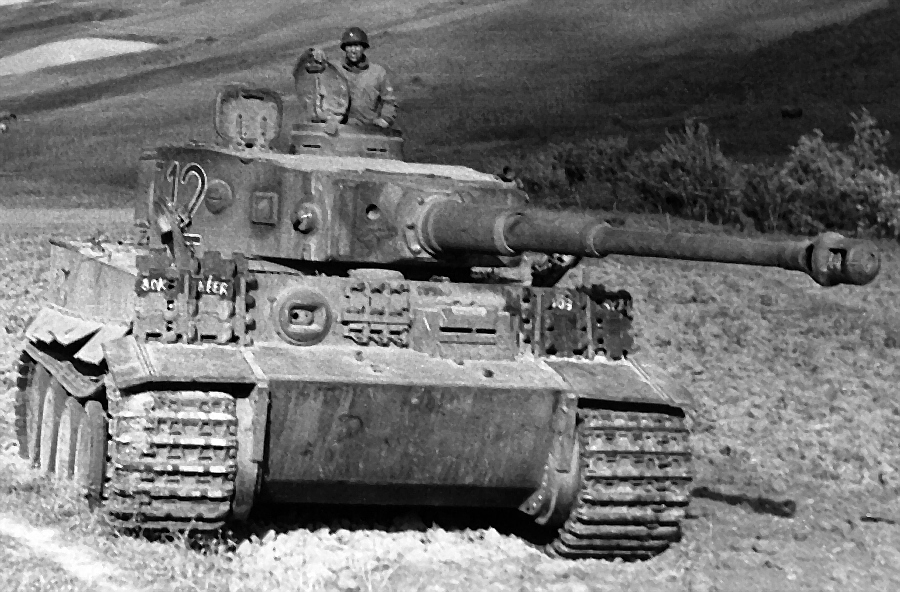
The Tiger I tank captured by the Allied Forces in North Africa during World War II

Erwin Aders (1881, Düsseldorf – 1974) was the chief designer for Germany's Henschel & Son during World War II. He led the design for the heavy tanks Tiger I and Tiger II.
