= Alfred Ader =

Polish fencer (1892–1941)

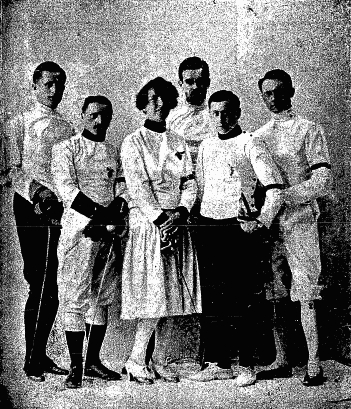
- Fencers team AZS Kraków in 1922. Second from the right is Alfred Ader.

Personal information
- Born: 17 October 1892 Kraków, Austria-Hungary
- Died: 19 October 1941 (aged 49) Warsaw, Poland

Sport
- Sport: Fencing

Alfred Ader (17 October 1892 – 19 October 1941) was a Polish fencer. He competed in the team sabre event at the 1924 Summer Olympics.
