= Ader =

French automobile

The Ader was a French automobile designed and built by Clément Ader, a pioneer in flight and telephone service.

The Ader car was built in Levallois-Perret, Seine, by his Société Industrielle des Téléphones-Voitures Système Ader between 1900 and 1907. The company first built bicycles in 1869 and tried steam powered aeroplanes between 1890 and 1897. In 1900 the first car was made with a V-twin engine of 904 cc and chain drive. In 1901 shaft drive was introduced along with a four cylinder car where the engine was essentially two of the V-twins coupled together. Two of the four-cylinder engines were joined to make a 3616 cc V-8 which was fitted to a car that ran in the 1903 Paris-Madrid race. That year Ader listed twin-cylinder cars of 904 cc and 1571 cc, as well as four-cylinder ones of 1810 cc and 3142 cc; each was available in a wide range of coachwork. A 24 hp vertical four was introduced in December 1903 at the Paris Salon.

A new company was formed in 1905 to separate car building activities from the other activities and registered as Société Ader. The factory was located at 40 bis Avenue de Suffren, Paris. The V engines were dropped in favour of the vertical ones in 1907 but this was the final year cars were made though the V-4 engines were made for supplying to other car and boat makers for a few years.

The Ader car was sold in the United Kingdom as the Pegasus.

In 1903 the company also made a shaft-driven motorcycle sold as the Moto-Cardan.
