= Paul-Werner Krapke =

German battle tank engineer (1915–2011)

- Born: 1915; Berlin, German Empire
- Known for: Leopard 2

Paul-Werner Krapke (1915–2011) was a German armored fighting vehicle engineer, notable for his management of the Leopard 2 project.

== Biography ==
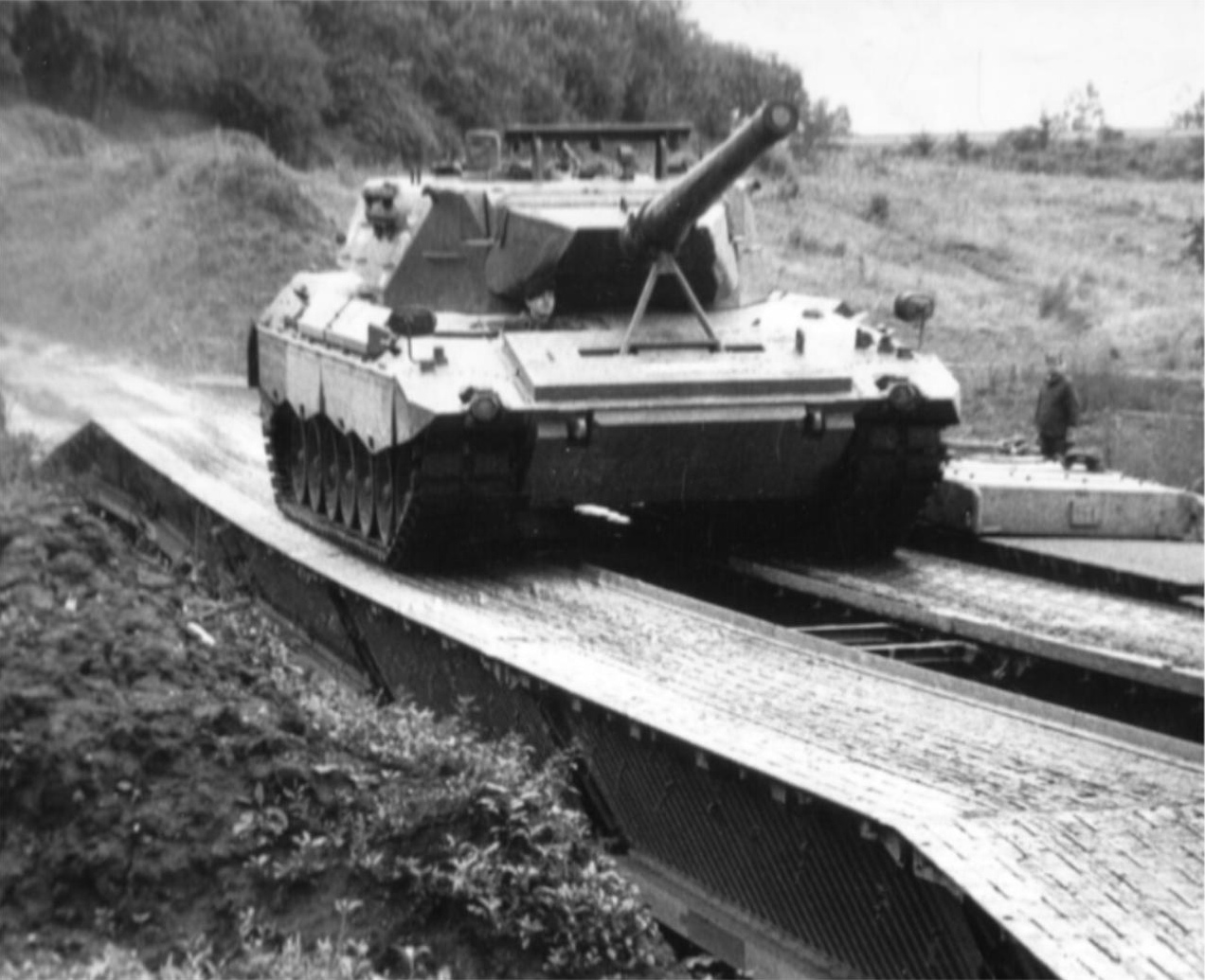
Leopard 2 prototype (1983)

Krapke was born in Autumn of 1915 in Berlin, German Empire. He graduated from high school in 1937, and began studying industrial engineering, graduating in 1940. He worked in the Deutsche Waffen und Munitionsfabriken for a short duration, before being drafted into the Wehrmacht's Sturmartillerie in 1942 and subsequently worked as a speaker for the Panzer III and Panzer IV projects for the Heereswaffenamt.

After the war, Krapke began construction of a paint factory in Hanover, and later Berlin. The difficult post-war economy convinced Krapke to settle down in West Germany in 1963. Through personal contacts, Krapke became employed in the Federal Office for Defense Technology and Procurement in January 1964, overseeing mass production of the Leopard 1.

After the failure of the KPz 70 program in 1969, Krapke was appointed to manage the Leopard 2 project in 1970. Following the successful introduction of the Leopard 2 into series production in 1979, Krapke retired in 1980. He remained as a consultant for armored fighting vehicle development until his retirement.

== Work ==
- Krapke, Paul-Werner (1986), Leopard 2: Sein Werden und seine Leistung, Mittler, ISBN 3813202054

== See also ==
- Leopard 1
- Leopard 2
- KPz 70
