= VT tank =

Versuchsträger 1–2
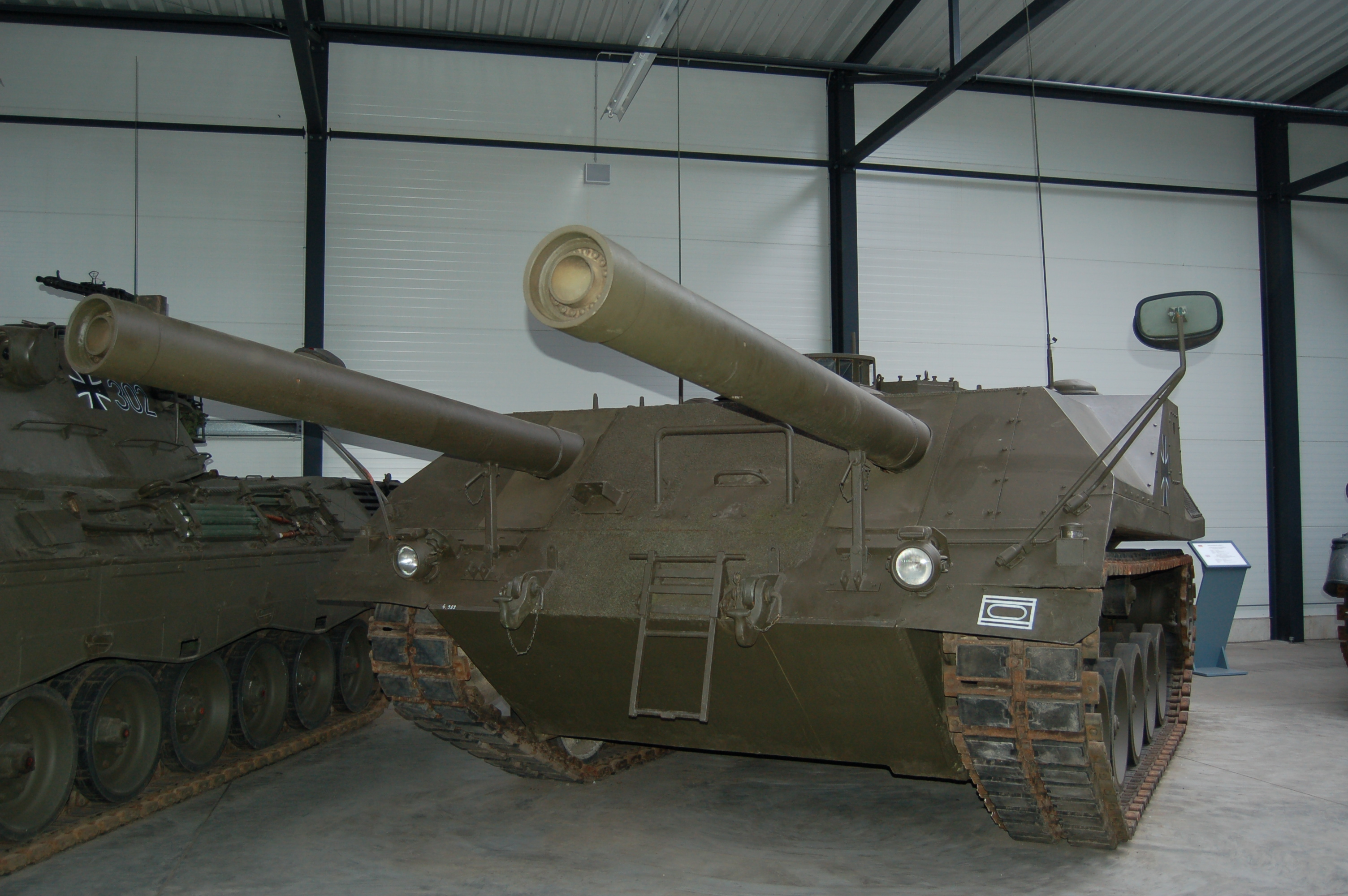
- The GVT 04 tank
- Type: Tank destroyer, medium tank
- Place of origin: West Germany

Production history
- Designer: MaK
- Designed: 1970s
- Manufacturer: MaK
- Produced: 1974 and 1975 (VT 1-1 and VT 1–2)
- No. built: 2 VTs and 5 GVTs
- Variants: VT 1-1, VT 1–2, GVTs

Specifications
- Mass: 43.5 tonnes (42.8 long tons; 48.0 short tons)
- Length: 9.06 m
- Width: 3.54 m
- Height: 2.04 m
- Crew: 3 (commander, driver, gunner)
- Main armament: 2 x 105 mm guns or 2 x Rh120 L/44 guns
- Engine: MTU MB803 Ra-500; 1,500 PS (sustained )(1,100 kW); 2,400 PS (short time)(1765 kW)
- Power/weight: 34.5 PS/t(sustained)(25.3 kW/t); 55 PS/t (short time)(40.5 kW/t)
- Suspension: hydropneumatic
- Maximum speed: 70 kilometres per hour (43 mph); 40 kilometres per hour (25 mph) offroad

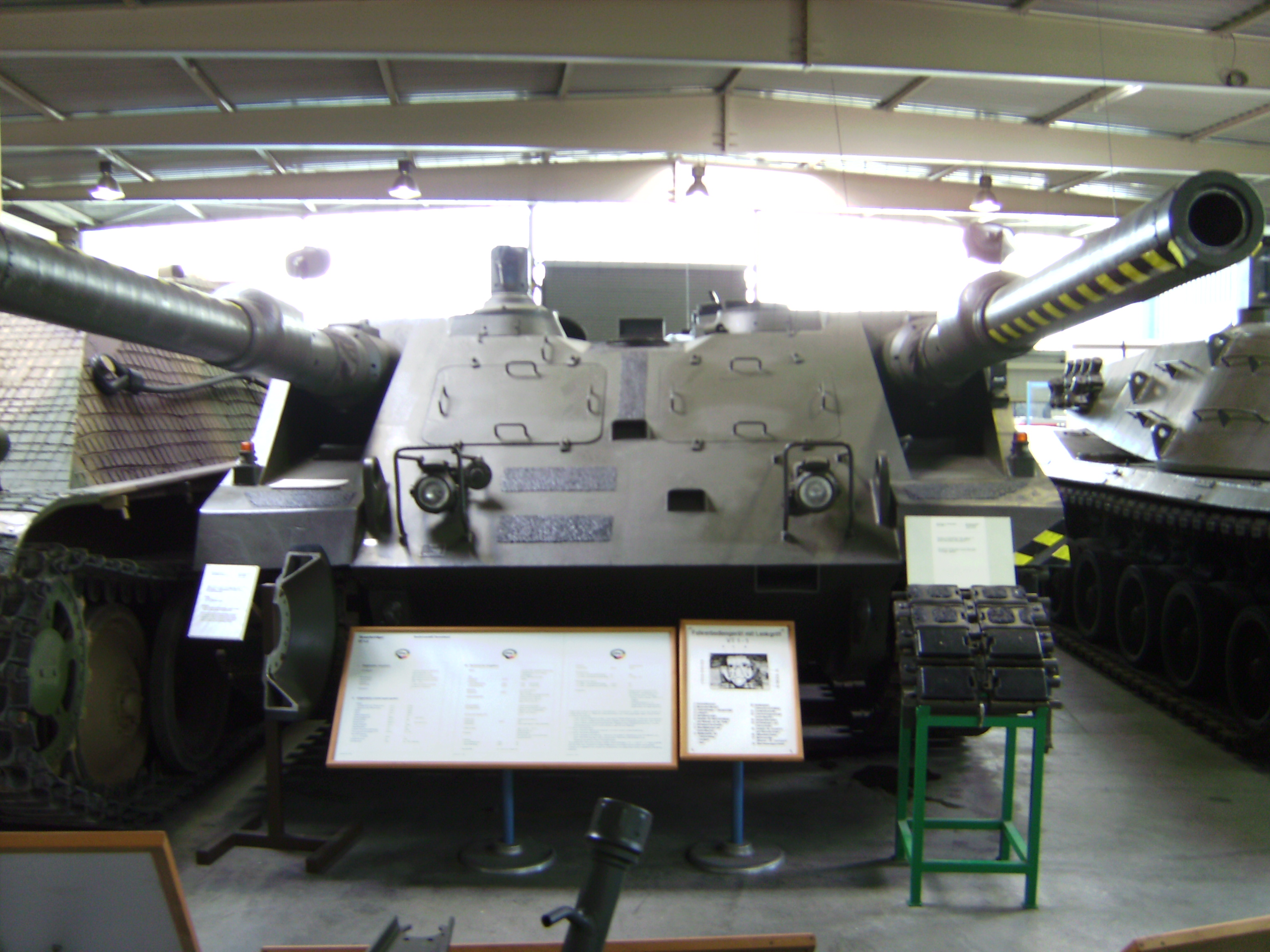
VT 1–2 front

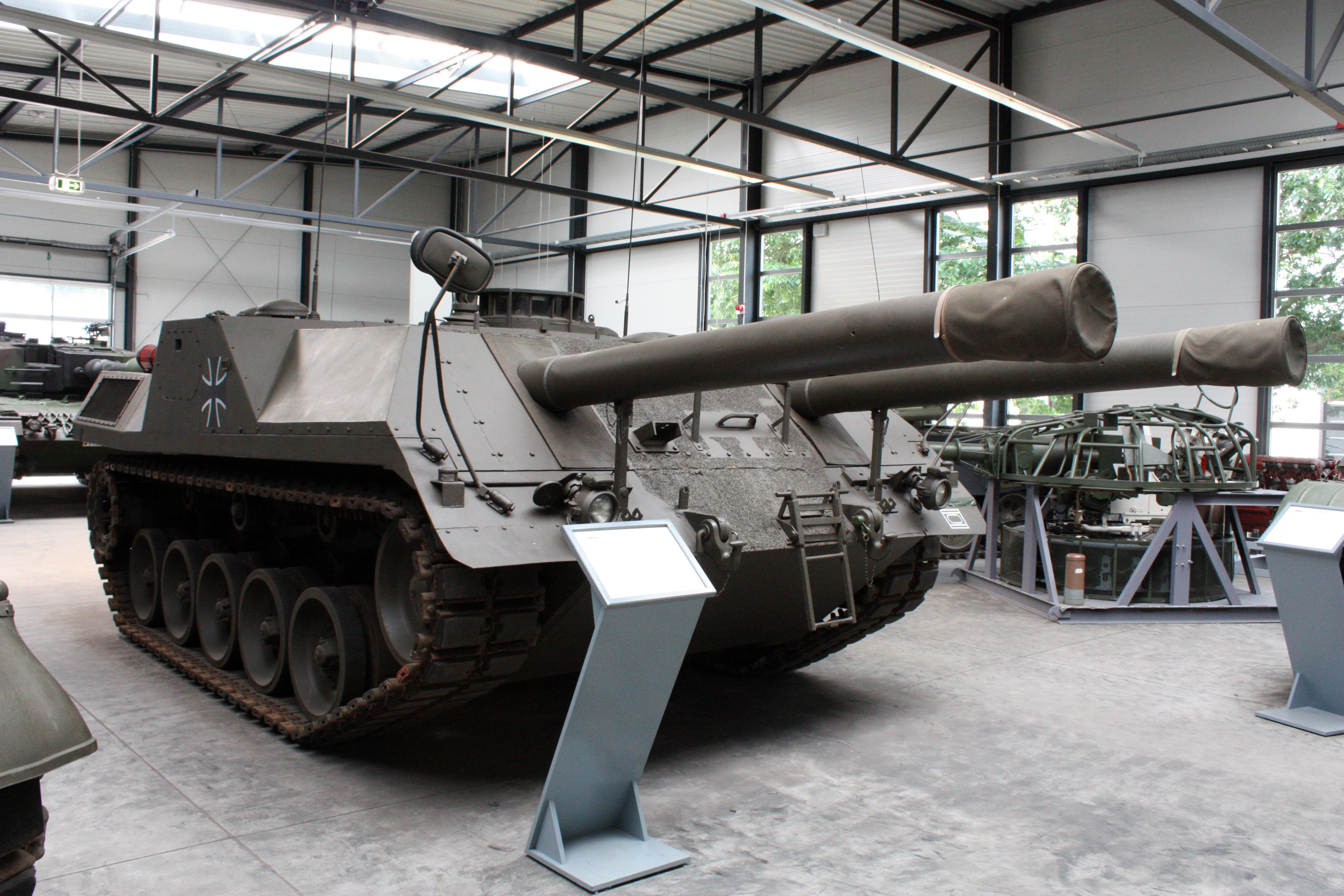
GVT 04

The Versuchsträger 1–2 (abbreviated: VT, meaning 'test-beds' or 'experiment carrier') were two German prototype twin gun turretless main battle tanks. Since the early 1970s a number of West German companies have been working on conceptual designs for a successor to the Leopard 1. This project had the name Kampfpanzer 3 (KPz 3). The KPz 3 project was temporarily a British-German joint project, until the UK withdrew because they wanted a turreted tank. The Germans had already developed the Leopard 2 and therefore didn't see the need for another conventional tank. One of the companies involved was MaK, developing the VT 1-1 and VT 1–2. The test programme ended proving that a twin-gunned turretless tank could be created with enough technical effort, but had drawbacks in both practical and tactical use.

== History ==
The first VT tank, VT 1-1, was built in 1974 by Maschinenbau Kiel (MaK). One year later they produced the second VT tank, the VT 1–2. For further testing of the mobility and the concept of a tank with two main guns, five Gefechtsfeldversuchträger (GVT, 'battlefield test-beds') were designed and built in 1975 and 1976.

== Design ==
The VT 1-1 was based on the shortened chassis of the cancelled MBT-70 tank. Since the tank had no autoloaders, a crew of four was needed to operate it. All VT tanks followed in some extent the traditional design of German Jagdpanzers, like the post-war Kanonenjagdpanzer.

The VT 1–2 featured a turbocharged engine, which was capable of 1,500 PS sustained and 2,400 PS for short periods of time. The tank had a three-man crew seated at the front, with driver between commander and gunner. A comparison with the Leopard 2 was held, which proved that the VT 1–2 tank wouldn't have any significant advantages over the Leopard 2. The engine of the Leopard 2 was not defining the concept and could therefore be replaced by the more powerful 12-cylinder engine of the VT 1–2 if required. The Leopard 2 also had a high first round hit probability, due to its advanced fire control system, which corresponds to or even surpass the calculated first round hit probability of the twin guns.

The VT tanks were designed to:

- reach a higher weapon efficiency through short reaction times, higher hit probability and higher kill probability by using twin guns in a casemate structure.
- be more mobile by using a stronger engine and a new suspension while saving weight through the absence of a turret.
- have a higher level of survivability by reducing the crew compartment, using heavy frontal armour and a much lower silhouette.

The idea was that the tank would close in on the enemy on a zig-zag course (Wedelfahrt, much like a skier wedeling downhill). The target would be locked into the aiming computer, the gunner would hold the trigger and the gun would fire automatically in the moment when the muzzle was on the target during the next change of direction.

The VT 1-1 was armed with two 105 mm rifled guns, which were loaded manually. The VT 1–2 carried two 120 mm smoothbore guns equipped with 6-round automatic loaders. The GVTs were not fitted with guns, instead they mounted two gun simulators. For combat simulations they used Talissi laser fire simulators. The propellant gases were created with a 20 mm cannon mounted on the roof.

== Variants ==
- VT 1-1 – 105 mm rifled guns with manual loading, based on the German–American KPz 70/MBT-70.
- VT 1–2 – 120 mm smoothbore guns with an automatic loader and an engine upgrade.
- GVT 01 – GVT 05

== See also ==
- M50 Ontos – tank destroyer with six M40 recoilless rifles
- Type 60 self-propelled 106 mm recoilless rifle – tank destroyer armed with two 105 mm recoilless rifles
- Stridsvagn 103 – turret-less main battle tank of the same era
