= U.S. Army Armor and Cavalry Collection =

Combat vehicle collection at Fort Benning, Georgia, USA

- Location within Georgia
- Location: Fort Benning, Georgia
- Coordinates: 32.3762°N 84.8403°W
- Type: Military museum
- Website: www.armorcavalryheritagefoundation.org

A walk through the "Tankodrome" in 2022

The United States Army Armor and Cavalry Collection is a combat vehicle collection owned by the Armor School located at Fort Benning, Georgia. It is one of the largest collections of armored fighting vehicles in the world.

In 2011 the U.S. Army Armor and Cavalry Collection relocated with the Armor School from Fort Knox, Kentucky to Fort Benning, Georgia. With the move a majority of the collection that was at the Patton Museum moved with the Armor and Cavalry Collection.

As of 2024 the museum was not open to the public. The museum began an open house series in 2018 when it had 36 vehicles. As of 2023 it had 190 pieces of armored fighting vehicles and anti-tank weapons.

== Gallery ==
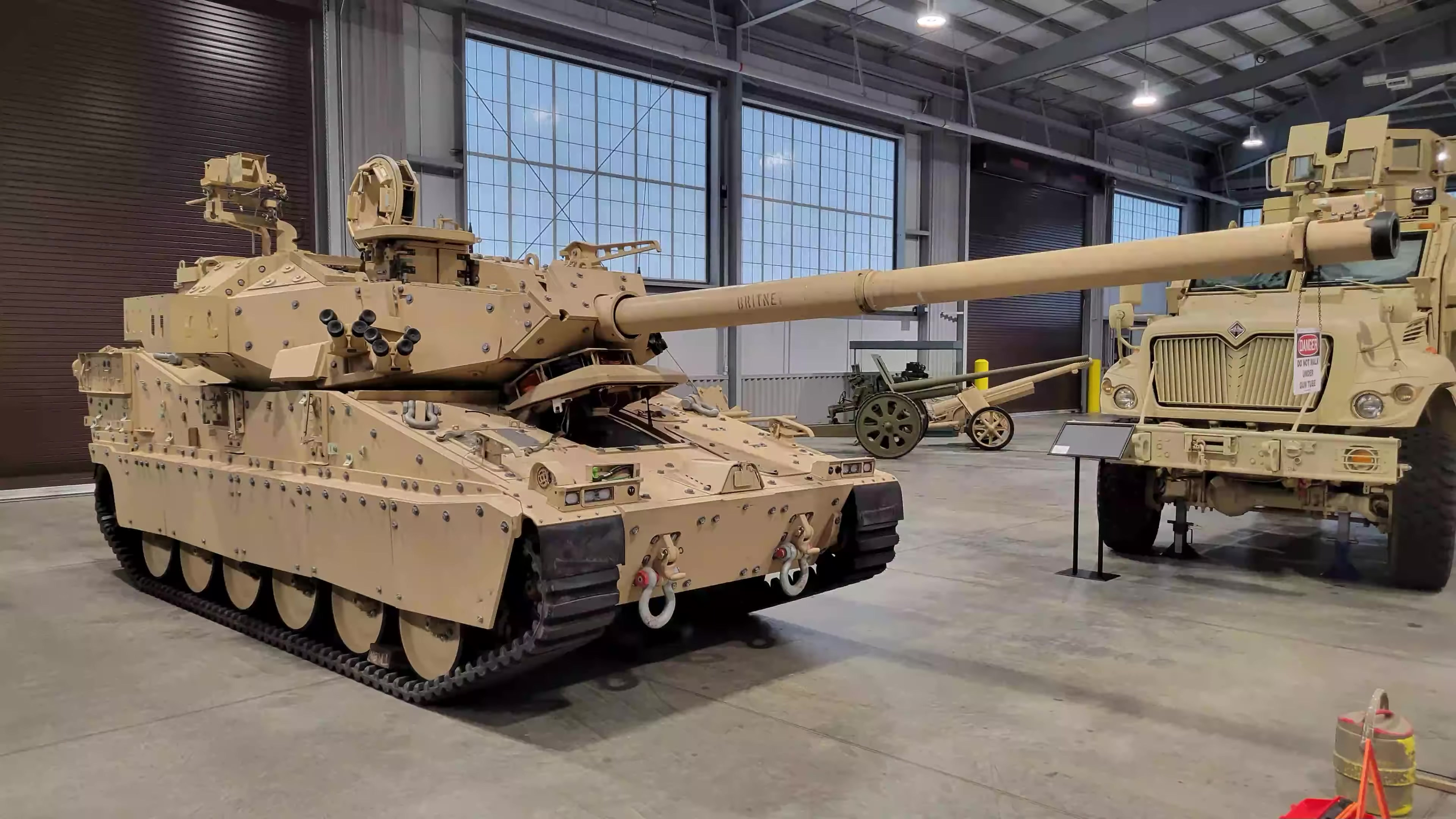
XM1302 Mobile Protected Firepower

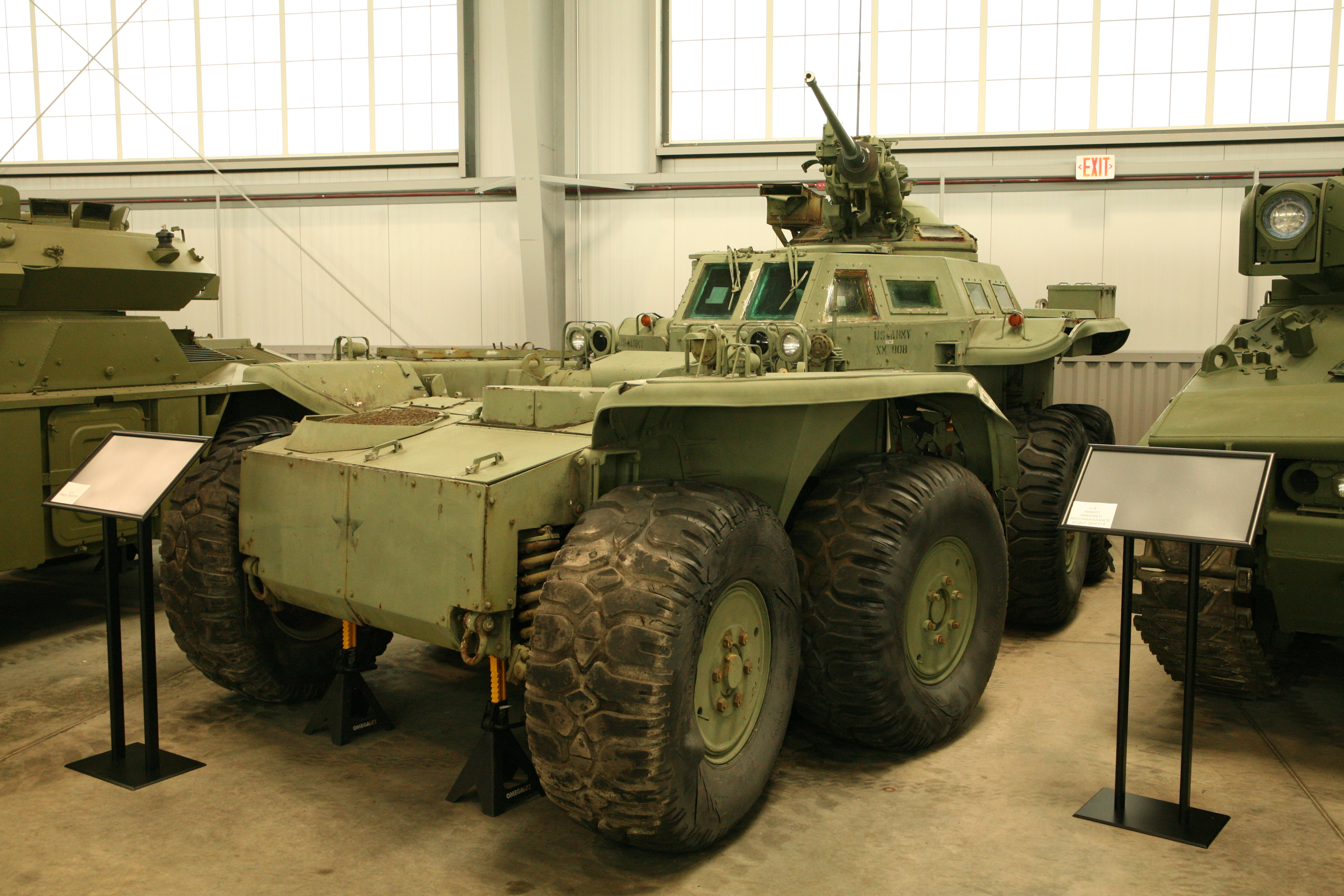
XM808

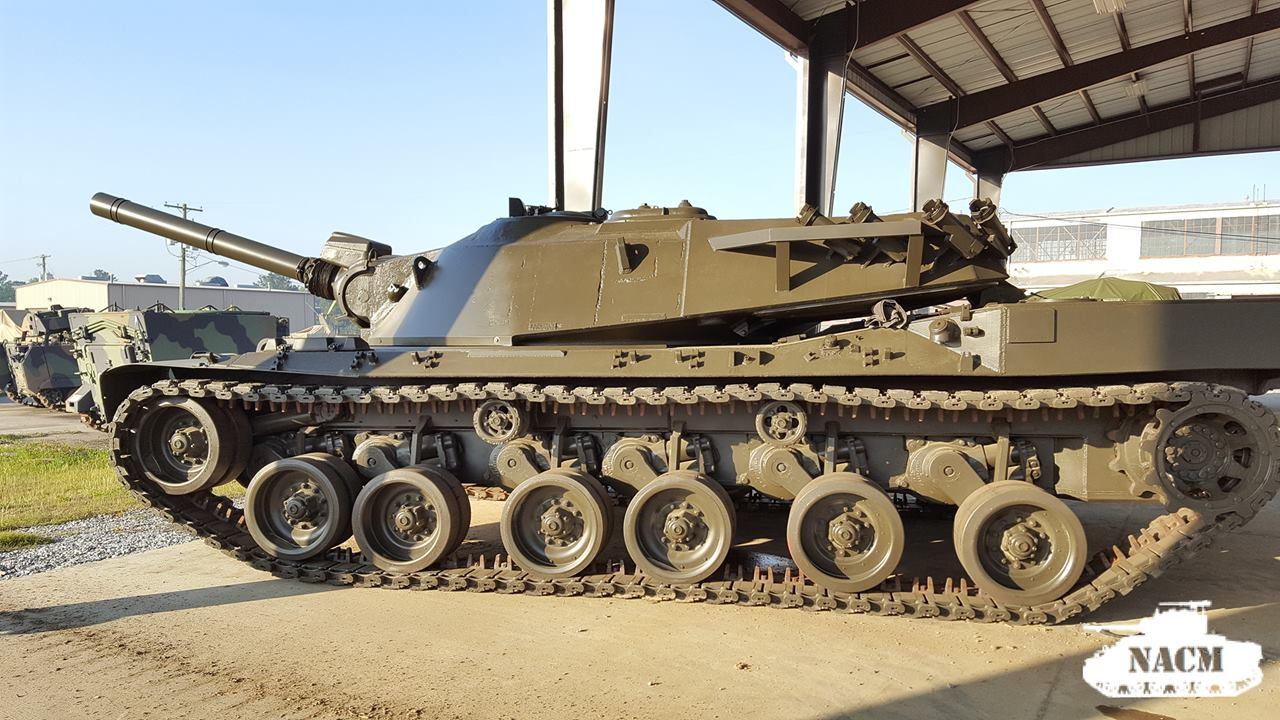
XM803

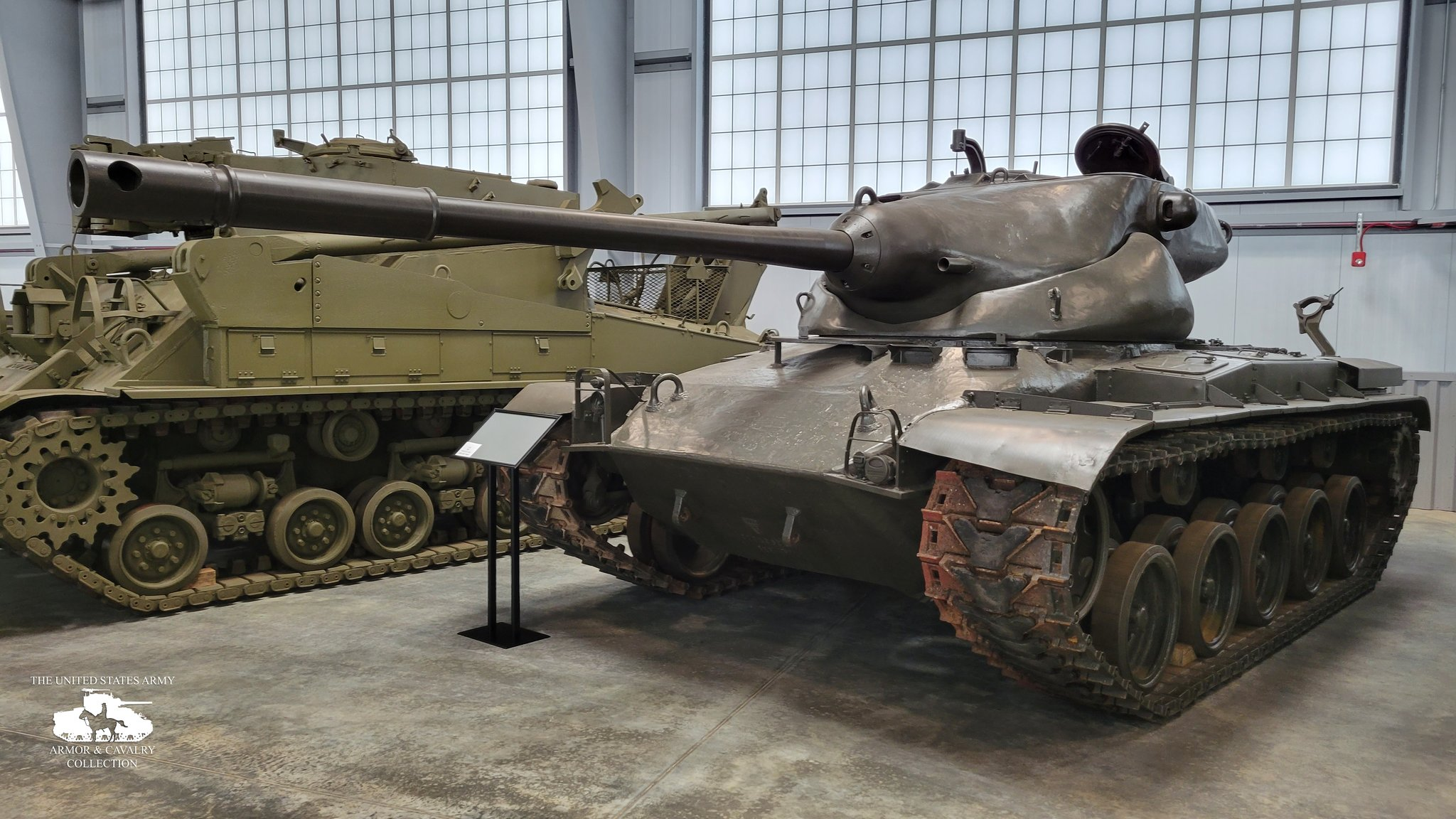
T69

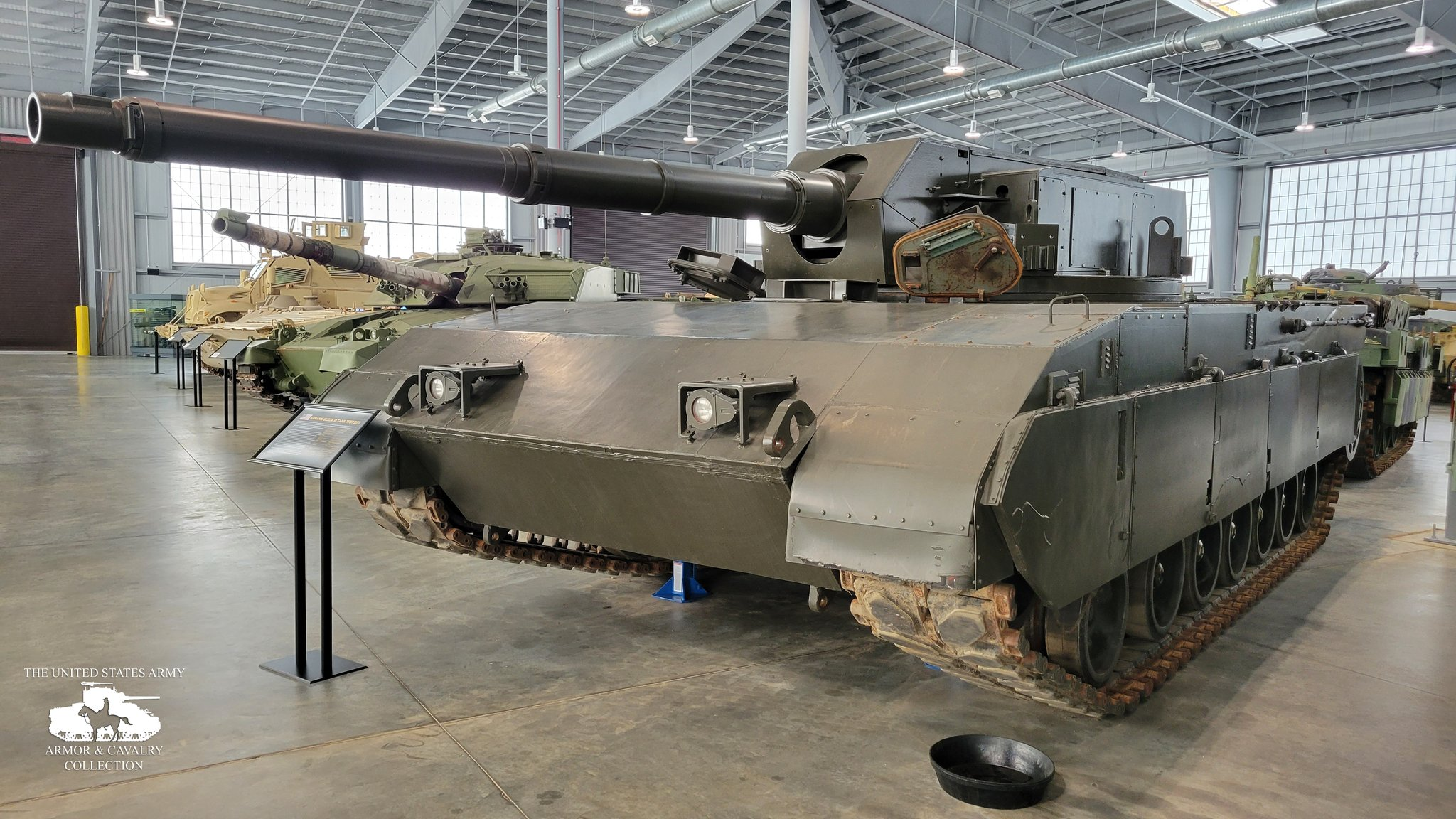
M1 Abrams Tank Test Bed

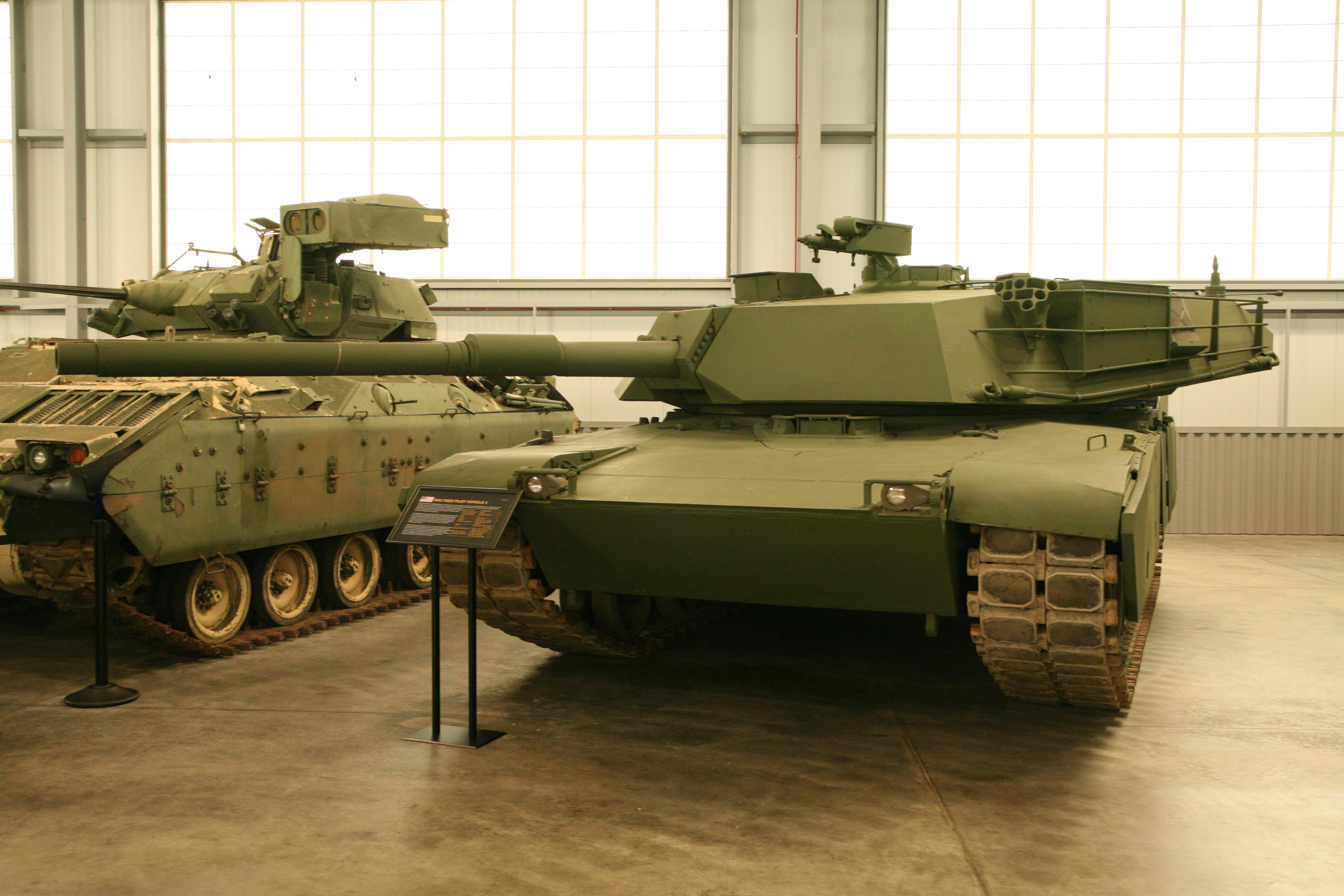
XM1 Abrams pilot vehicle 1

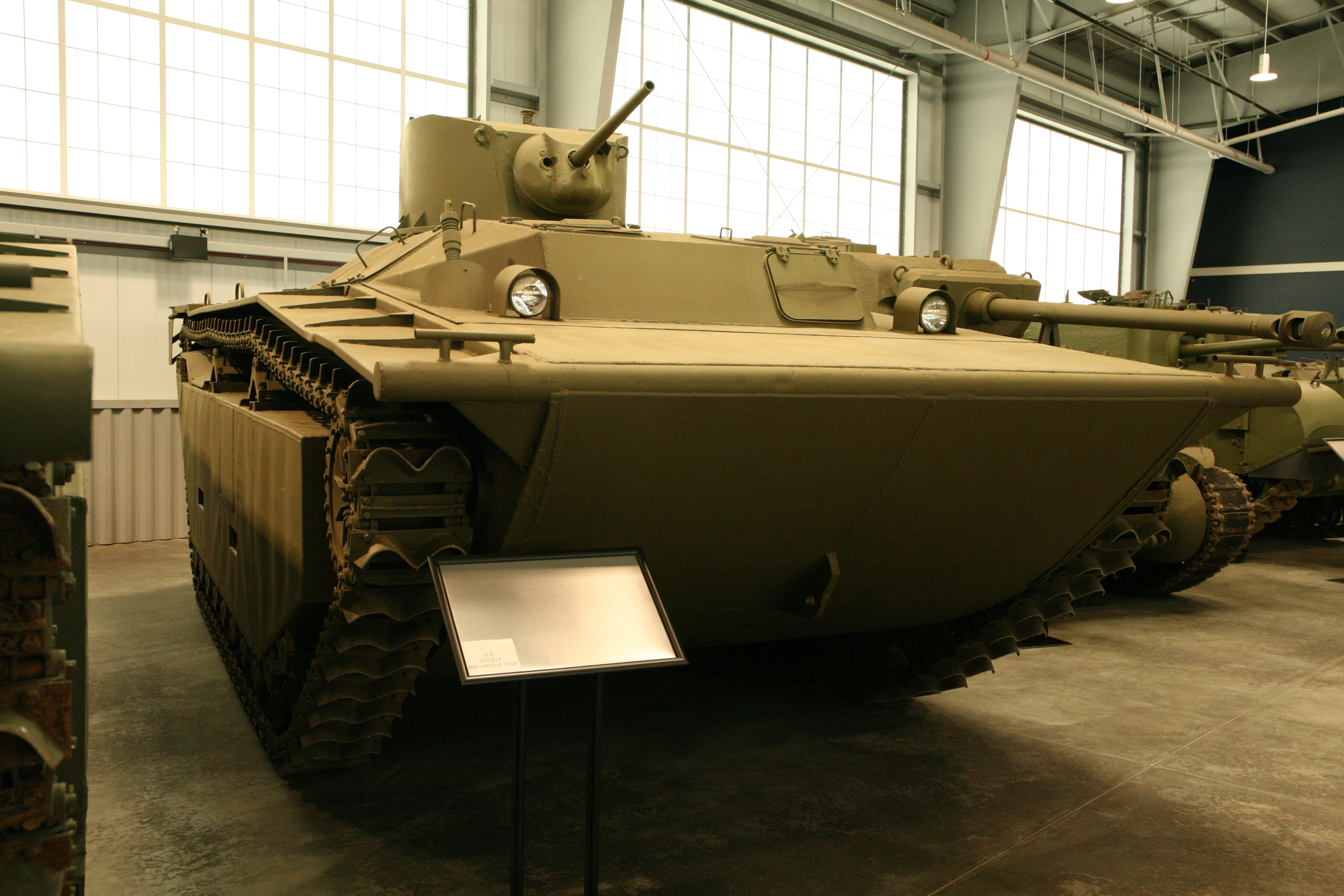
LVT(A)-1

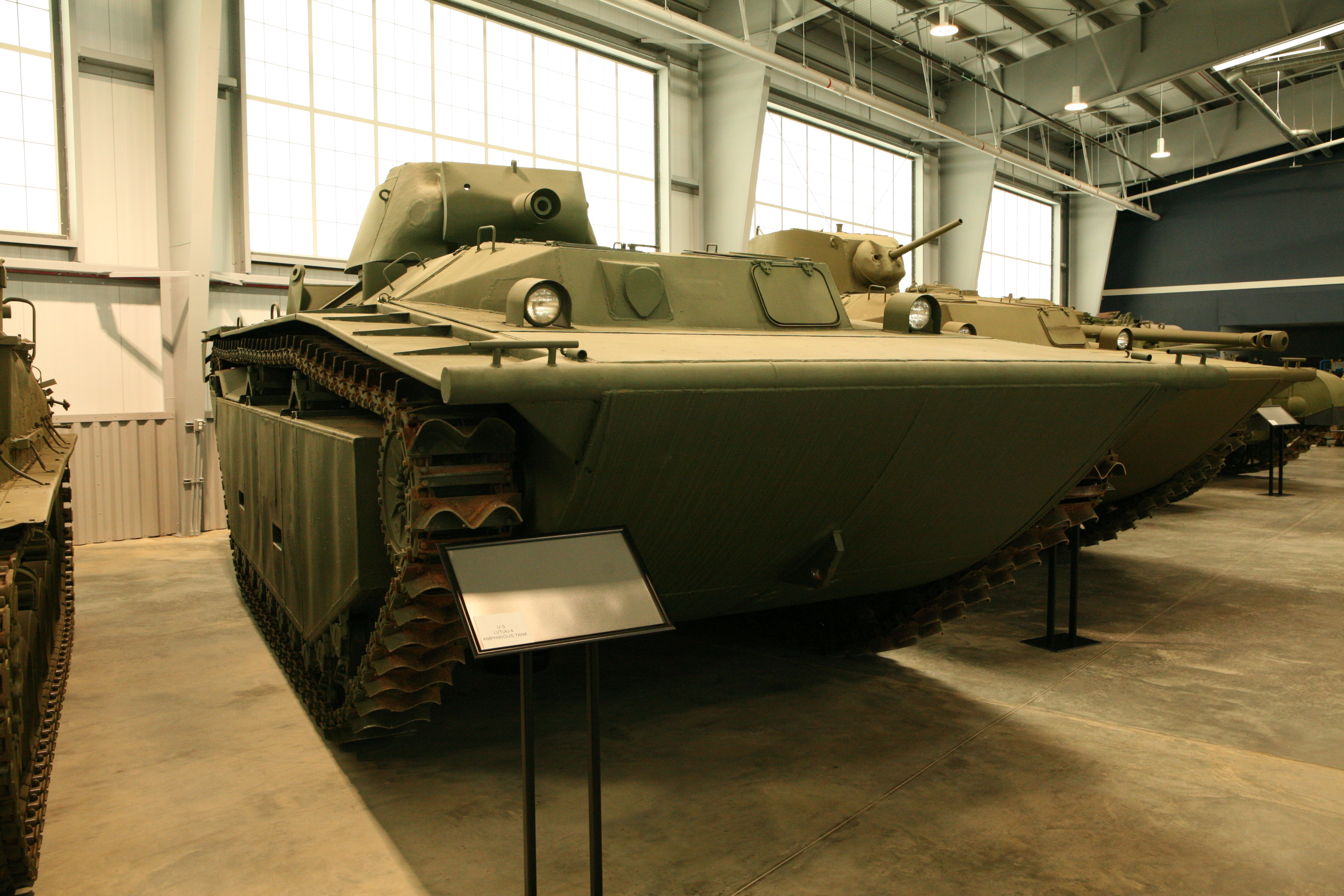
LVT(A)-4

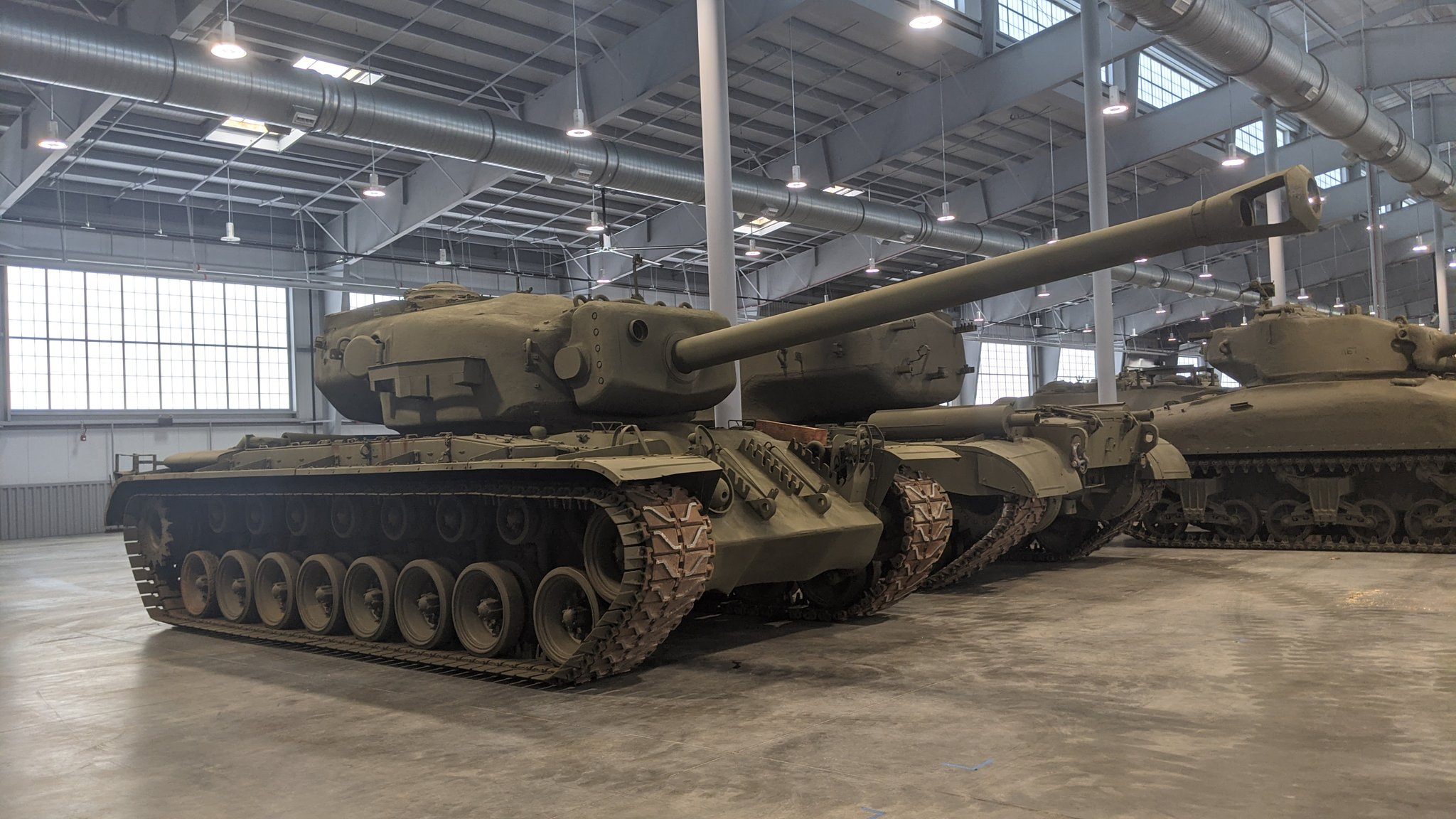
T30 heavy tank

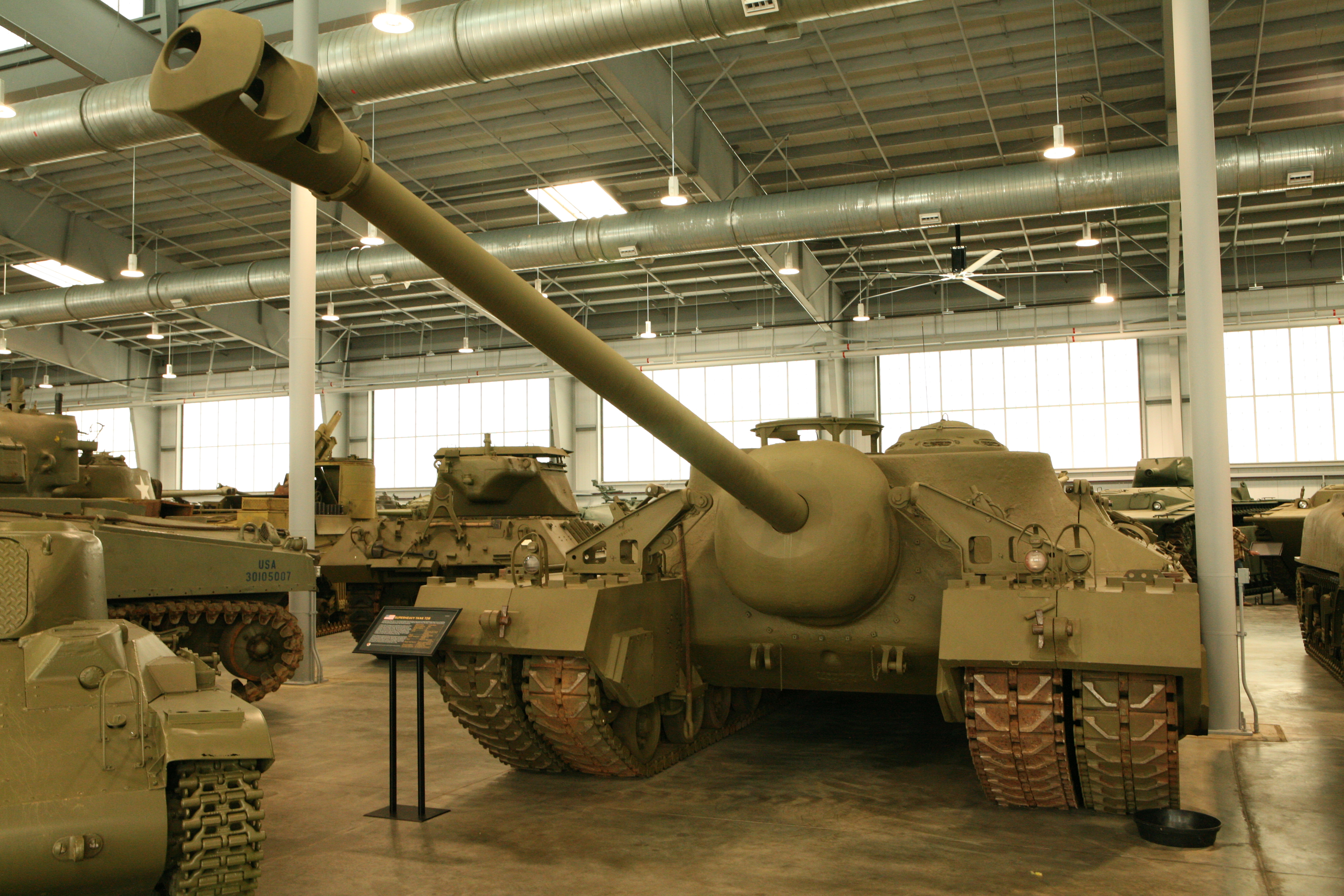
T28 super-heavy tank

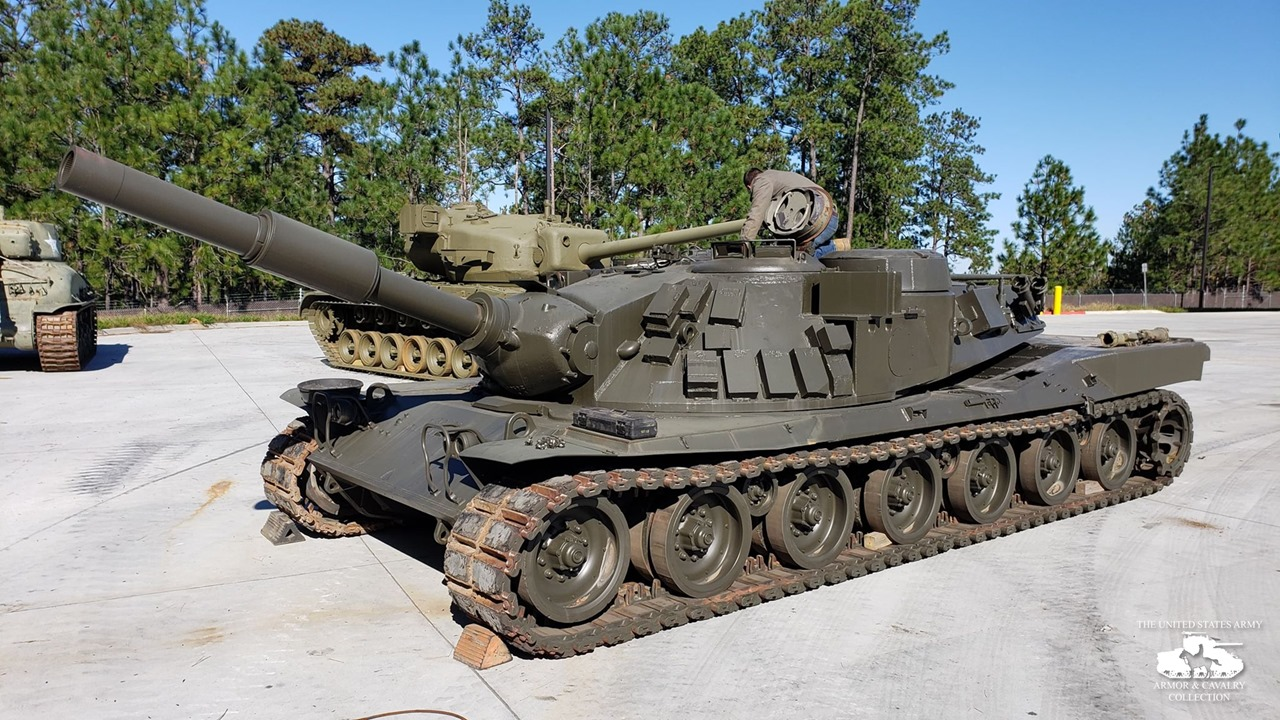
MBT-70
