= Avco-Lycoming AGT1500 =

Turbine engine

AGT1500
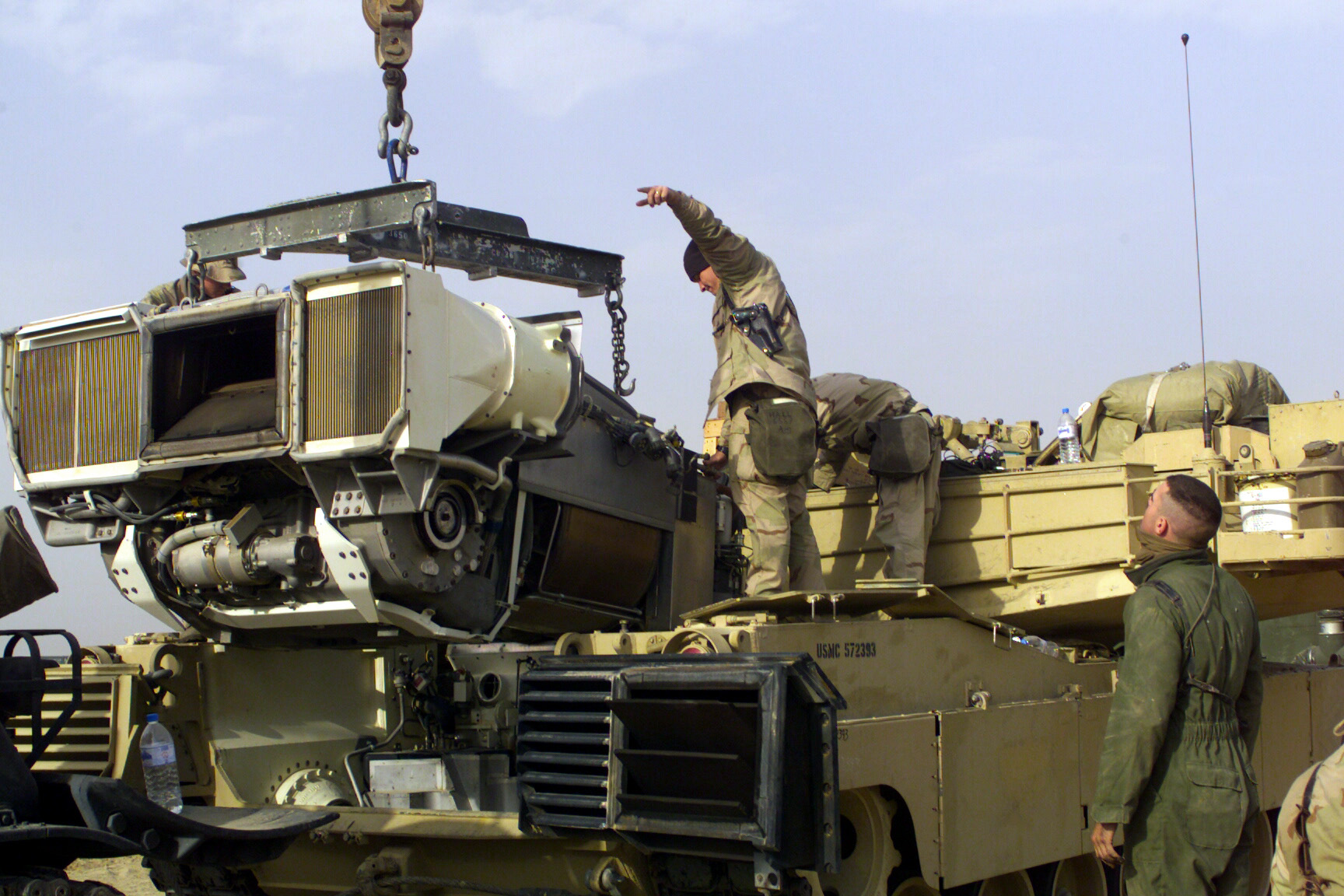
- U.S. Marines load an AGT1500 engine back into an M1A1 Abrams tank at Camp Coyote, Kuwait in February 2003.
- Type: Turboshaft gas turbine
- National origin: United States
- Manufacturer: Lycoming Engines; Honeywell Aerospace
- Major applications: M1 Abrams

The Avco-Lycoming AGT1500 is a gas turbine engine. It is the main powerplant of the M1 Abrams series of tanks. The engine was originally designed and produced by the Lycoming Turbine Engine Division in the Stratford Army Engine Plant. In 1995, production was moved to the Anniston Army Depot in Anniston, Alabama, after the Stratford Army Engine Plant was shut down.

== Specifications ==
Engine output peaks at 1,500 hp (1,100 kW), with 2,750 lb⋅ft (3,730 N⋅m) of torque at that peak, which occurs at 3,000 rpm. The turbine can provide torque in excess of 667 lb⋅ft (904 N⋅m) at significantly lower RPMs. The engine weighs approximately 2,500 lb (1,100 kg) and occupies a volume of 40 ft^{3} (1.1 m^{3}), measuring 63 in × 40 in × 28 in (1,600 mm × 1,020 mm × 710 mm).

The engine can use a variety of fuels, including jet fuel, gasoline, diesel and marine diesel.

The engine is a three-shaft machine composed of five sub-modules:

1. Recuperator – a fixed cylindrical regenerative heat exchanger that extracts waste heat from the exhaust gases and uses it to preheat the compressed air
2. Rotating Gas Producer – the five-stage, dual-spool compressor which achieves a 14.5:1 compression ratio at full power, driven by the compressor turbine, which operates with a maximum turbine inlet temperature of 2,180 °F (1,190 °C)
3. Accessory Gearbox – bevel gears that extract 35 to 100 hp (26 to 75 kW) from the high-pressure spool to operate the fuel control unit, starter, oil pump, and vehicle hydraulic pump
4. Power Turbines – the first stage of the two-stage power turbine is driven by a variable-geometry nozzle to improve efficiency
5. Reduction Gearbox – reduces power turboshaft speed

== History ==
Development had started by 1964 with a contract given to Chrysler in 1976, originally as an engine for the later cancelled MBT-70.

In the early 1970s, the AGT1500 was developed into the PLT27, a flight-weight turboshaft for use in helicopters. This engine lost to the General Electric GE12 (T700) in three separate competitions to power the UH-60, AH-64, and SH-60. Serial production of the AGT1500 began in 1980; by 1992, more than 11,000 engines had been delivered. In 1986, with the Cold War about to wind down, Textron Lycoming began developing a commercial marine derivative, which they called the TF15.

== See also ==
- Anselm Franz, lead designer of AGT1500 at the early stage
