= MBT-70 =

American-West German main battle tank

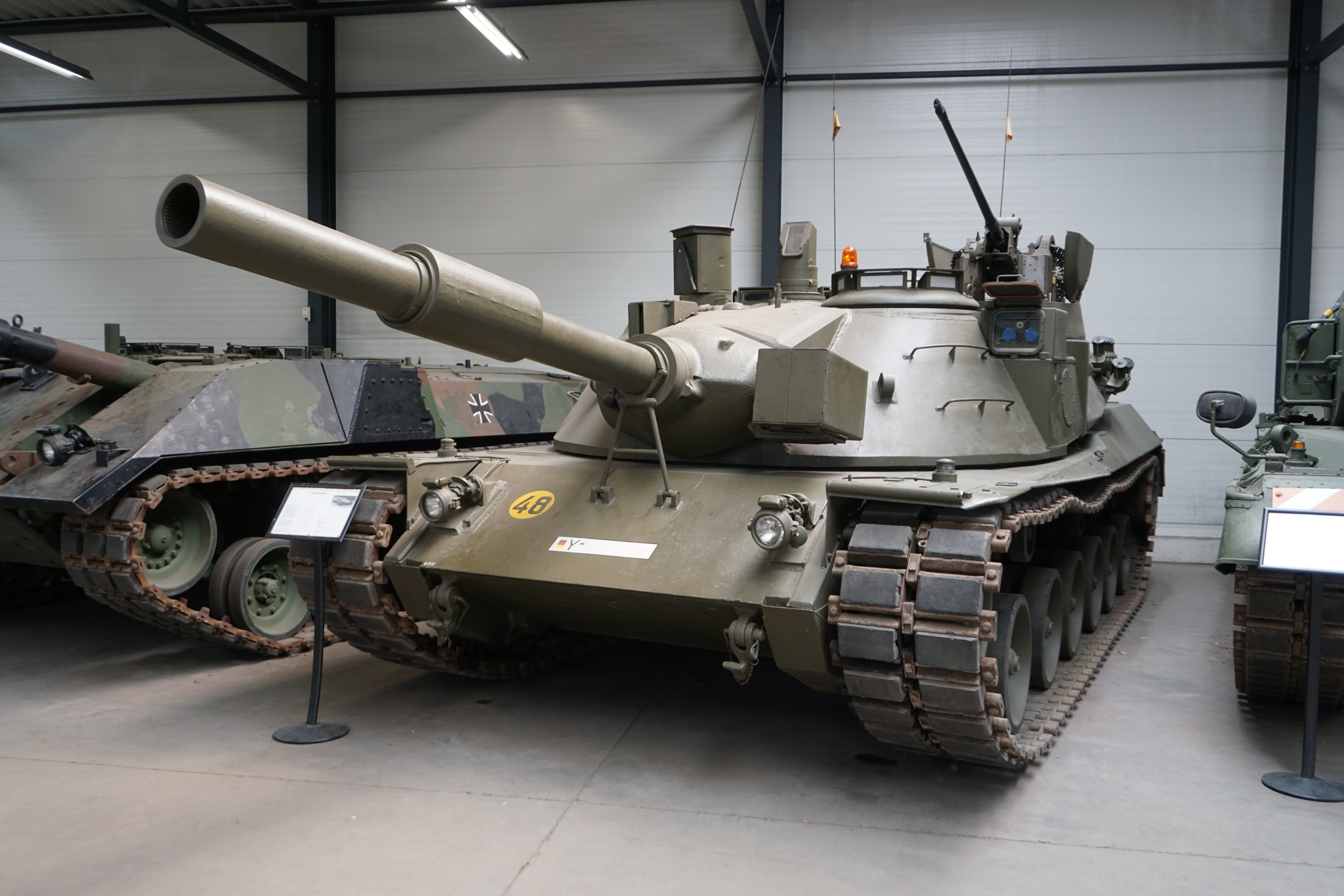
- MBT-70 (KpfPz-70)
- Type: Main battle tank
- Place of origin: United States; West Germany

Production history
- No. built: 14 (prototypes and pilots)

Specifications
- Mass: 50.4 tonnes (49.6 long tons; 55.6 short tons)
- Length: 9.1 metres (29 ft 10 in)
- Width: 3.51 metres (11 ft 6 in)
- Height: 1.99 to 2.59 m (6 ft 6 in to 8 ft 6 in)
- Crew: 3
- Armor: Spaced armour Two layers spaced with 127mm, the inner a softer steel that also served as a spall liner (46mm), and the outer of harder cold-rolled steel (34mm).
- Main armament: 152 mm XM150E5
- Secondary armament: 20 mm Rh-202 autocannon 7.62 mm M73 or MG 3 machine gun (coaxial)
- Engine: 1,470 horsepower (1,100 kW) (MBT-70); 1,500 horsepower (1,100 kW) (KPz-70)
- Power/weight: 29.2 hp/t (MBT-70); 29.8 hp/t (KPz-70)
- Transmission: Renk HSWL354/2
- Suspension: Hydropneumatic
- Fuel capacity: 1,300 litres (343 gallons)
- Operational range: 644 km (400 miles)
- Maximum speed: 68.7 km/h (42.7 mph)

The MBT-70 (German: KPz 70 or KpfPz 70) was an American–West German cancelled joint project to develop a new main battle tank during the 1960s.

The MBT-70 was developed by the United States and West Germany in the context of the Cold War, intended to counter the new generation of tanks developed by the Soviet Union for the Warsaw Pact. The new tank was to be equipped with a number of advanced features such as newly developed "kneeling" hydropneumatic suspension and housing the entire crew in the large turret, and was armed with a 152mm XM150 gun/launcher, which could use both conventional ammunition and the MGM-51 Shillelagh missile for long range combat.

The program faced significant challenges from the start, including poor communication and coordination between the American and West German teams working on the project. The U.S. Army and the German Bundeswehr had different requirements which were not aligned and were not resolved before the project was too far advanced to be changed.

By the late 1960s, the development of the MBT-70 was well over budget, leading West Germany to withdraw from the project in 1969. The United States continued development of the MBT-70 (spun off as the XM803) until 1971 when the program was finally cancelled, with funds and technology from the MBT-70 project redirected to the development of the M1 Abrams. West Germany independently developed the Leopard 2 as its new main battle tank.

== History ==
=== Background ===
The joint German–US main battle tank program was the brainchild of US Secretary of Defense Robert McNamara. After serving in the US Army Air Forces during World War II, McNamara became a "Whiz Kid" at Ford Motor Company, where he later rose to become president. McNamara's interest in German engineering had been shown during his tenure as head of Ford. He had shepherded development of the abortive Ford Cardinal – a cancelled project involving the redevelopment for US and other international markets of a compact family car designed by engineers in both the US and Germany. This, it was hoped, would result in a new, competitive product for international markets, with reduced development costs.

As Defense Secretary, McNamara began to apply his methods of industrial management to military production. At the time, NATO member states fielded many different weapons systems and these generally lacked common ammunition, fuel and parts; few weapons were developed jointly, including tanks. While West Germany used American M48 Pattons, it had historically excelled in engineering armored fighting vehicles and was known to be proceeding with plans to design, develop and build its own tanks. McNamara regarded Germany as an increasingly important member of NATO and believed that joint development would yield superior weapons that could also be used by other NATO members, as well as allies outside NATO.

In 1961, McNamara approached German Minister of Defence Franz Josef Strauss about beginning a collaborative main battle tank program. Strauss wrote off McNamara's idea and suggested that the U.S. should buy the Leopard 1. Germany, which was readying production of its indigenous Leopard 1 tank, had little interest in starting another main battle tank project. Strauss did however agree to a common component program. McNamara continued to press for Germany's cooperation in a common tank program, succeeding the next year in brokering a tentative agreement with the Germans.

The US Armor Branch had long been pressing the Pentagon to fast-track new main battle tank designs. Consequently, McNamara's seven-year timeline to production was opposed by senior armor officers, who believed an all-new MBT was more urgently needed. Others questioned McNamara's high regard for German engineering, arguing that Germany's collective abilities in tank design and engineering had dwindled and not kept pace with innovations since the end of World War II. Within US armored circles, it was believed that there would be a net technology transfer towards Germany and there was a common belief that the UK would make a better partner. However, McNamara's choice of Germany was also due to the country's excellent economic position, following its successful post-war rebuilding: the so-called "economic miracle". Hence Germany was better positioned to financially commit to a project of this scale.

In order to develop a tank that would meet the requirements of both armies, in August 1963, Germany and the United States signed a memorandum of understanding that specified certain desired characteristics and organized a Joint Engineering Agency and a Joint Design Team with equal representation from both countries. Despite these measures, conflicts between the differing engineering practices of each country would plague the MBT-70 project throughout its development.

=== Development of the MBT-70 ===
In 1963, General Welborn G. Dolvin, a former tank commander, was chosen to lead the US team as project manager. Three contractors—Chrysler Defense, General Motors and a joint venture of Ford and FMC—entered contention to become the contractor on the American side. Dolvin chose GM, anticipating the company would bring more fresh ideas to the table than longtime incumbent tank producer Chrysler. For the Germans, the German Development Corporation was formed as a joint venture of several German firms.

For the first phase of development, GM engineers would work alongside German engineers in Augsburg. For this part, Americans would manage Germans. For the second phase, the arrangement would be reversed: Germans would take over management at GM's factories in Detroit.

There were disputes over almost every part of the design: the gun, the engine, and the use of both metric and SAE units in the separately manufactured components of the tank. This last dispute was, by far, the most contentious. The disagreement rose to McNamara and German Defense Minister Kai-Uwe von Hassel, who were also unable to settle on a common measurement system. An agreement was made for both sides to use their own preferred measurements on parts they designed. The Americans conceded that metric be used on all fastening points. This was settled by an agreement to use a common metric standard in all interface connections. The resulting complexity contributed to delays in the development schedule, and an inflated project budget. Another national difference was different methods of projection. In production, confusion over which projection method was being used could result in fabrication errors such as holes placed in the wrong side.

The Americans were taken aback by the German's approach to intellectual property. The German firms jealously guarded their trade secrets from the Americans and pushed aggressively for the use of their products in the final product. This cultural confusion stemmed from differences in the procurement system of both countries. In the US, the Pentagon footed the expenses for most research and development. In return, the government kept complete ownership of the product of the research. German firms conducted research and development under government contracts like in the US, but retained all the rights to their design. There was thus a great incentive for German firms to solicit orders for their designs.

Dolvin stepped down in October 1966 to assume command of an armored division. The program was considered to be at least moderately successful when Major General Edwin H. Burba took over the project.

Nevertheless, many problems with the tank's political future arose in the US. When a design was finalized in 1965, US program costs were estimated at $138 million. With a production decision looming in 1968, this rose to $303 million. The following year critics came up with a different estimate of more than half a billion by accounting for other additional costs.

Programmatic complexity and growing costs contributed to Germany's disillusionment with the joint project. Germany was concerned about the design differences that were emerging between the two teams. Germany regarded the unconventional American engine as unproven and believed the American gun/launcher as a design that would add costs and complexity to the design while offering only marginal gains in accuracy at ranges beyond 2000 meters (while being worse at ordinary ranges). The use of non-metric fasteners, insisted upon by the Americans, was also believed by Germany to have been an unnecessary compromise. In 1965, Germany reduced its financial commitment to the program, claiming it was unable to pay for its half of the expenses. By 1969, Germany had reduced its involvement with the project, which was becoming a political embarrassment within the Bundeswehr. Germany reduced its Detroit office presence to a mere skeleton crew. Germany sought to reduce the size of its KPz-70 purchase, originally 500 tanks, if not cancel it altogether.

Many Americans both inside and outside the project, including General Creighton Abrams, hoped for an amicable end to German involvement in the program. Burba was succeeded by Brigadier General Bernard R. Luczak in mid-1968. Luczak agreed that the German partnership was not working out. Luczak found support from Deputy Secretary David Packard, who brokered an agreement to end the tank partnership in January 1970.

=== Concurrent developments ===
By 1965 the German Leopard 1 and the US M60 were the newest main battle tanks in their respective country's service. They were armed with the M68 105 mm rifled gun (developed from the British 105mm L7) and designed to counter Soviet T-54/55 tanks, which they successfully did, according to Israeli combat experience. But it became very clear that due to the same experience the next generation of Soviet tanks would have increased firepower and protection, and both designs would be placed at a disadvantage by the new smoothbore gun in the T-62. An upgrade project for the Leopard was planned, but it appeared this model would not be enough of an advance to be worthwhile.

== Design ==
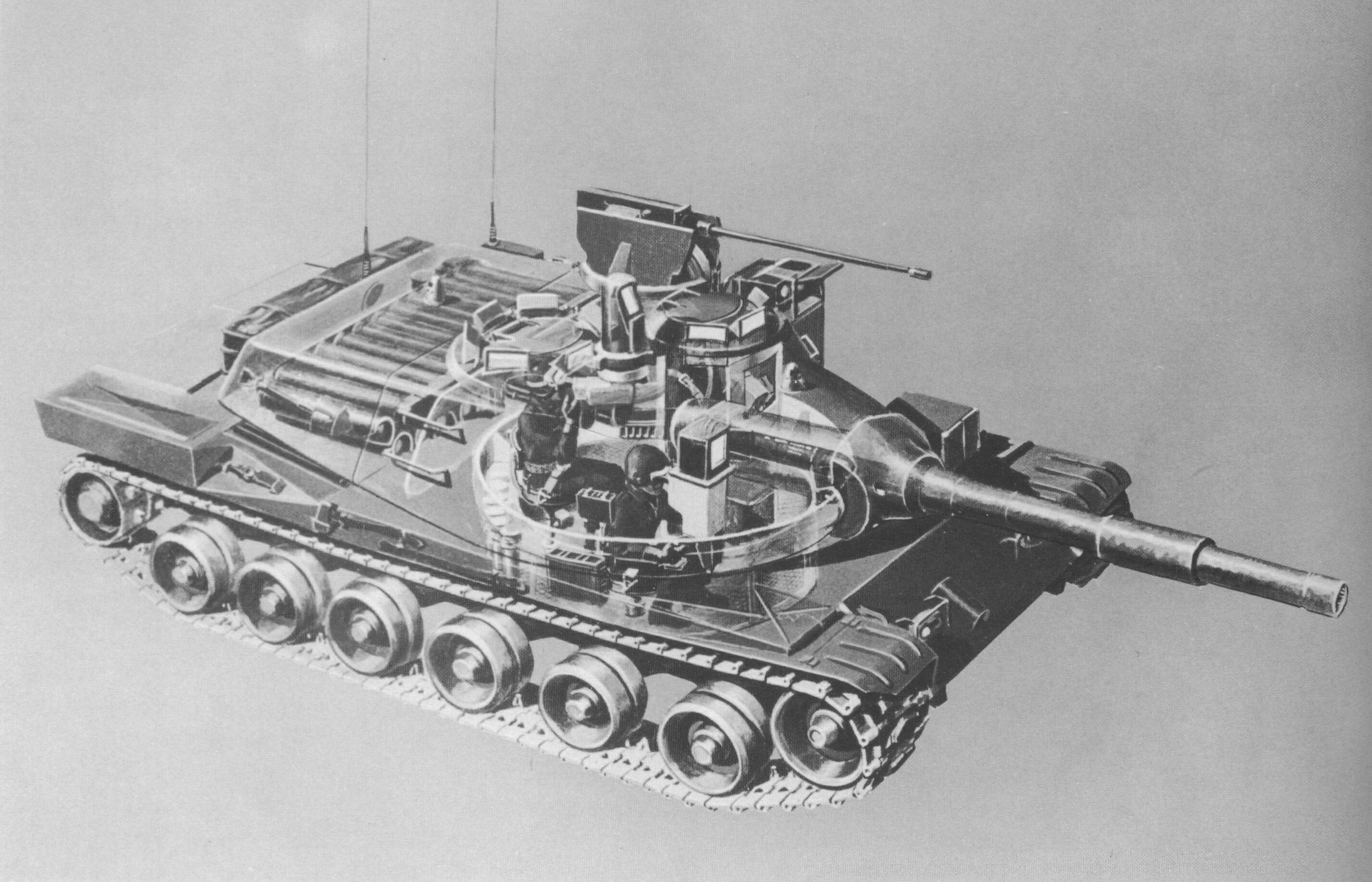
Interior arrangement. Gunner's station in right foreground, commander's station to his rear, driver's rotating capsule partially obscured in left side of turret

Many features of the MBT-70 were ahead of their time. The vehicle used an advanced hydropneumatic suspension system that allowed for fast cross-country speeds even though it was to weigh 45 tonnes (50 short tons). The suspension could be raised or lowered on command by the driver, down to put the bottom of the tank just over 4 inches (100 mm) from the ground, or up to 28 inches (710 mm) for cross-country running.

The MBT-70 was designed with a low silhouette, unlike the M60, one of the tallest tanks ever built. The MBT-70 ended up very low, just over 6 feet (1.8 m) from the floor to the turret-roof. This left no room in the hull for the driver, who had to be moved into the turret. He was located in a cupola which was geared to rotate so that he was always looking in the same direction even if the turret turned. He could also spin the cupola around, so the tank could be driven backwards at full speed.

The US version was to mount the newly developed Continental AVCR air-cooled V-12 diesel of 1,470 horsepower (1,100 kW). German versions originally used a similar Daimler-Benz model, but later moved to an MTU design of 1,500 horsepower (1,100 kW). The MTU unit could be easily swapped out of the tank, along with the drive train, in 15 minutes. Both versions could reach 43 miles per hour (69 km/h) on their engines, compared to 31.06 miles per hour (49.99 km/h) for the T-62.

=== Armament ===
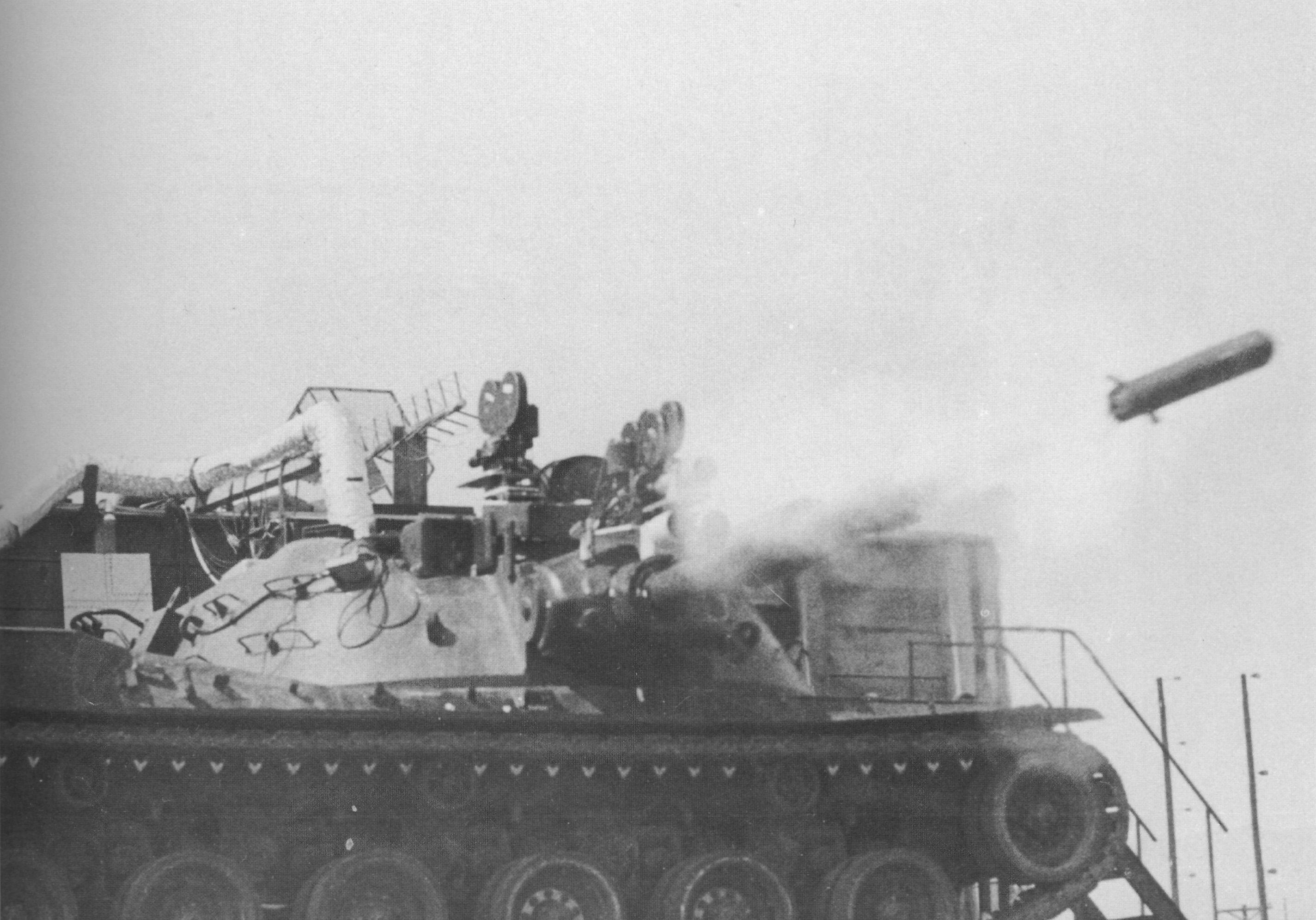
MBT-70 prototype test firing an MGM-51 missile

The MBT-70's main armament was a stabilized XM150 152 mm gun/launcher, a longer-barreled and improved variant of the XM-81 gun/launcher used in the light M551 Sheridan and the M60A2 "Starship". This gun/launcher could fire conventional 152 mm rounds like High Explosive, anti-personnel, M409A1 High Explosive Anti-Tank (HEAT) and the XM578E1 Armor-piercing fin-stabilized discarding sabot (APFSDS) rounds, Beehive anti-personnel rounds, but also the MGM-51 Shillelagh missile, a 152 mm guided missile, which had a combat range of some 3,000 metres (9,800 ft).

In the 1960s the effective combat range of the 105 mm L7 tank gun was considered to be about 1,800 metres (5,900 ft). The XM578 APFSDS round was made of a newly developed tungsten alloy, which was 97.5 percent tungsten. This new alloy had a density of 18.5 g·cm³, which was a big improvement compared to the older tungsten-carbide APDS and APFSDS rounds. Another new feature of the ammunition was that the tank rounds were "caseless"; i.e., they had combustible cases.

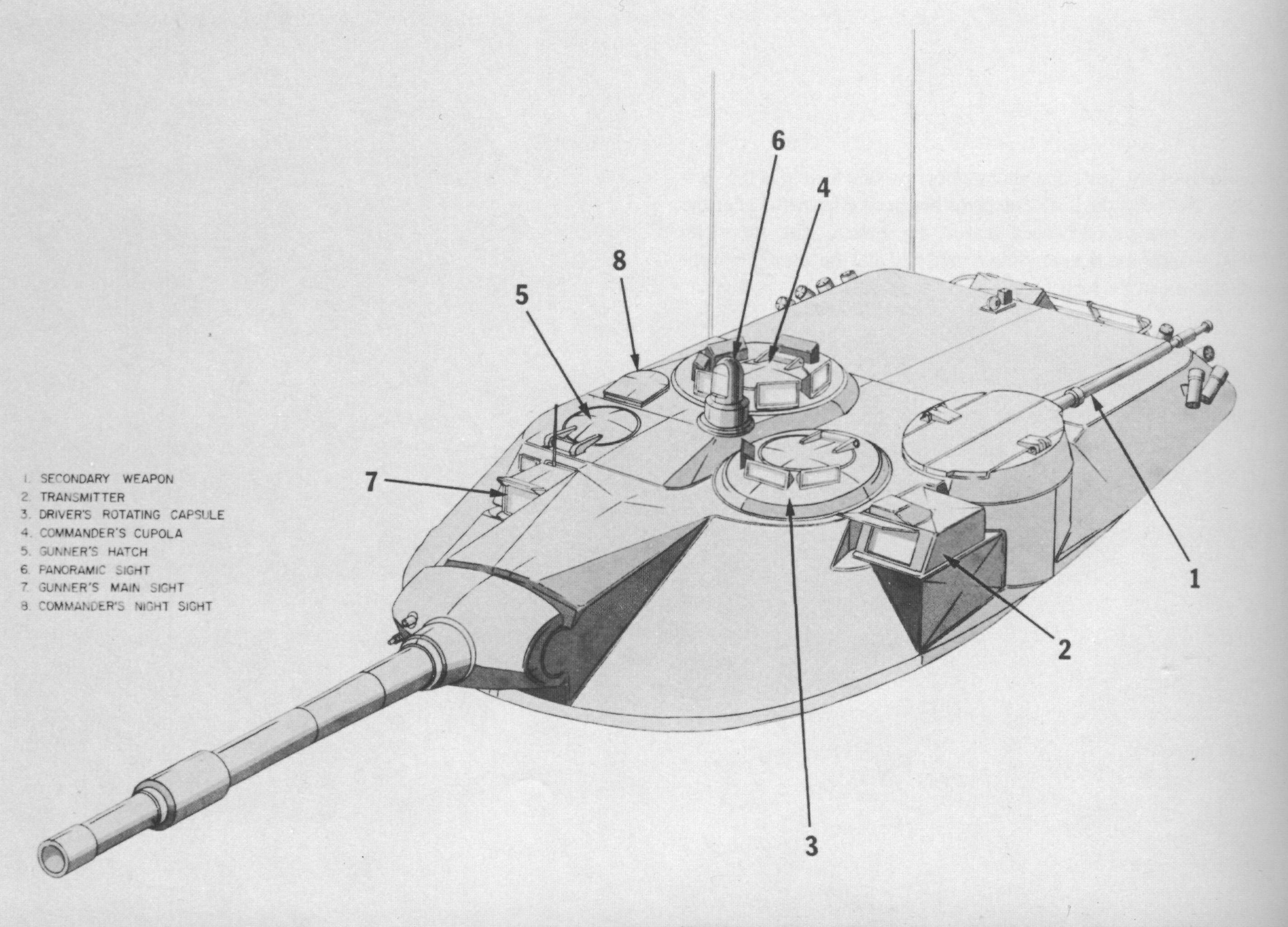
Turret weapon layout, autocannon in stowed position, barrel pointing backwards

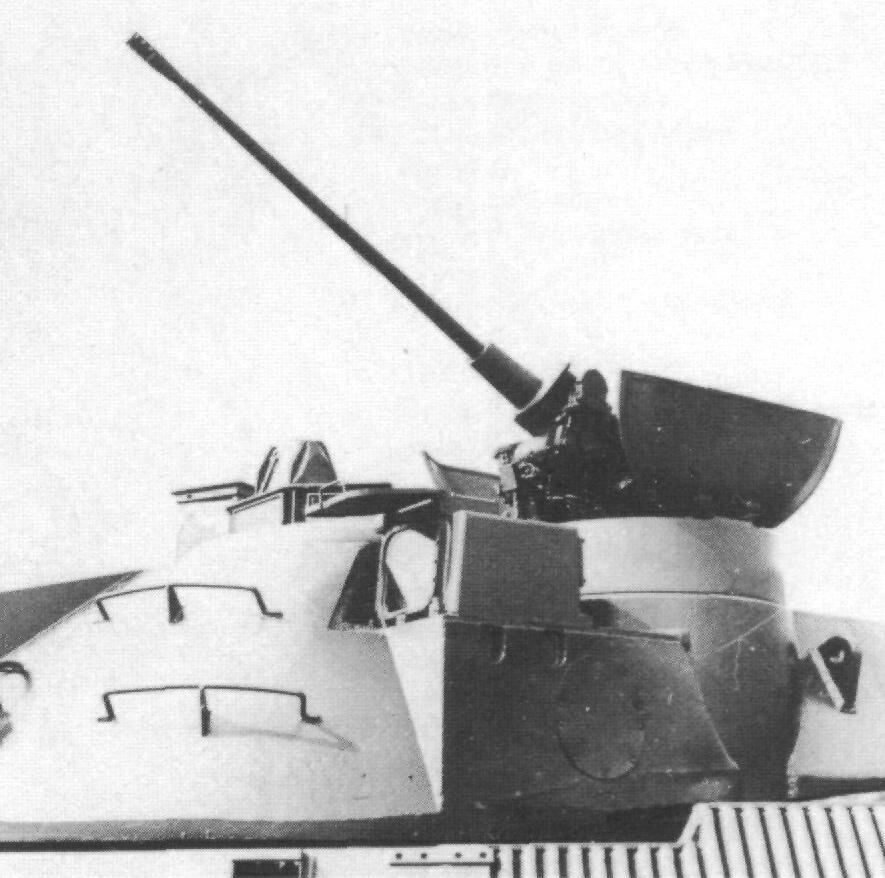
The 20 mm autocannon deployed

The MBT-70 was equipped with a laser rangefinder and a 26-round auto-loader in the turret bustle. Although the auto-loader was supposed to be capable of loading both missiles and combustible-case tank rounds, the German Rheinmetall autoloader was prone to deforming the ammunition's fragile combustible cases. The Americans substituted the German autoloader with a General Motors design, which increased the ammunition capacity to 48 rounds. Italy had also contributed to the XM-150 as the automatic loading system was built by OTO Melara (now Leonardo). This proposed automatic loading system had a vertical rotating magazine equipped with 16 containers, for 5 types of ammunition, which allowed a firing speed of 12 rounds per minute.

46 152 mm rounds could be carried on the models with Rheinmetall autoloaders. The MBT-70 with the GM autoloader could carry 48 rounds, and the XM803 could carry 50 rounds. The MBT-70 with the Rheinmetall loader carried 26 rounds in the autoloader. Twenty more rounds were carried in two compartments including eight rounds stowed on the rear hull bulkhead and twelve behind the driver's capsule.

The Germans were planning to use the MBT-70 in combination with the Keiler, a tank equipped with a Rheinmetall 120 mm smoothbore gun. Therefore, a suggestion was made to base a version of the Keiler on the MBT-70 chassis; this version was nicknamed Eber, but only a wooden mock-up was made. According to the German plans, the MBT-70 would destroy enemies at long ranges, while the Keiler would have an effective combat range of up to 2,000 metres (6,600 ft).

The secondary armament of the MBT-70 consisted of a remote-controlled 20 mm Rh 202 autocannon (with storage for 750 or 660 rounds) for use against aircraft and light armored vehicles. The gun could be retracted into a container behind the driver's rotating cupola for protection as well as to reduce overall height, and was operated remotely by the commander. Furthermore, a 7.62 mm was mounted co-axially alongside the main gun for close defense. The US prototypes were fitted with the M73 machine gun, while the German version utilized the MG 3 machine gun.

The ammunition load of the MBT-70 prototype seen in the Deutsches Panzermuseum consists of 42 tank rounds, 6 Shillelagh missiles, 660 20×139 mm cannon rounds and 2,700 7.62×51mm NATO machine gun rounds.

=== Protection ===
The frontal area of both the hull and turret was protected by spaced armor and provision was made for the installation of a polyethylene radiation shielding to achieve an attenuation ratio of 20:1 against neutron radiation.

The outer layer was made of High Performance Armour developed in the United States and incorporated in the mid-1960s in the design of the MBT-70. The High Performance Armour contained 9% of nickel and 4% of cobalt and was produced by vacuum arc remelting. It was heat treated to 500 BHN, like the other types of high hardness armor, but it was produced from the start in the form of plates 40 mm thick. The frontal arc of the MBT-70 was protected against 105 mm APDS ammunition fired from 800 m distance.

Two watertight armored transverse bulkheads separated the crew in the center from the multi-ply rubber fuel tank in the front compartment and the engine compartment in the rear.

To save weight, aluminum was used for the engine compartment floor and for access doors on the engine deck. The MBT-70 was protected against electromagnetic pulses and nuclear, biological and chemical weapons as well.

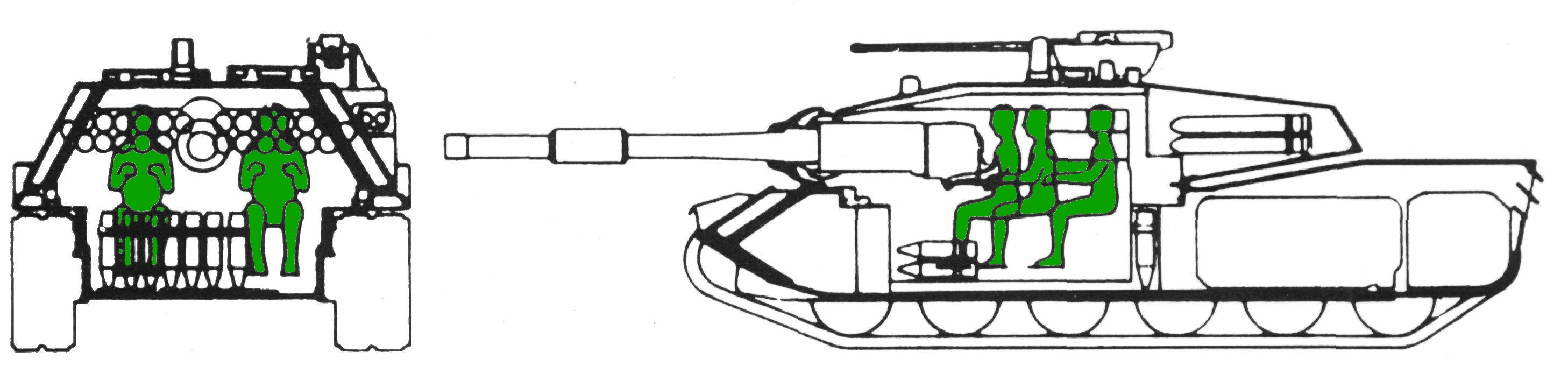
Sketch showing spaced frontal armor, low profile and seating arrangement of crew

The tank's low silhouette, which could be lowered from 2.59 metres (8 ft 6 in) to only 1.99 metres (6 ft 6 in), was also a large advantage. Compared to the M60 tank, the MBT-70 had a lower profile. With the hydropneumatic suspension lowered it was also smaller than the Leopard 1, which gave the MBT-70 a better hull down position.

The MBT-70 was equipped with eight XM176 smoke grenade dischargers, each discharger barrel contained two smoke grenades; one AN-M8 HC and one M34 WP. Actuated from the commander's station, these launchers provided close-in protection and concealment for the vehicle. The KPz-70 was equipped with 16 in four rows of 4.

=== Mobility ===
American variant

The American variant was powered by a Continental Motors AVCR-1100 diesel engine, 1,475 bhp (1,100 kW). This was paired to a German Renk electro-hydraulic transmission. The top speed was 68 kilometres per hour (42 mph) and the range was 645 kilometres (401 mi). The top reverse speed was the same as its top forward speed.

In 1969, the American team decided to eventually replace the diesel engine with an Avco-Lycoming AGT-1500 gas turbine engine on the production model.

West German variant

The Daimler-Benz/MTU MB 873 Ka-500 four-stroke diesel engine on the German variant was heavier and larger than the American Continental Motors engine. The choice of this engine required some changes to the chassis. The engine was paired with a Renk HSWL 354/2 hydraulically operated gearbox with four gears and two reverse. The top speed was 72 kilometres (45 mi) and the range was 580 kilometres (360 mi).

== Testing ==
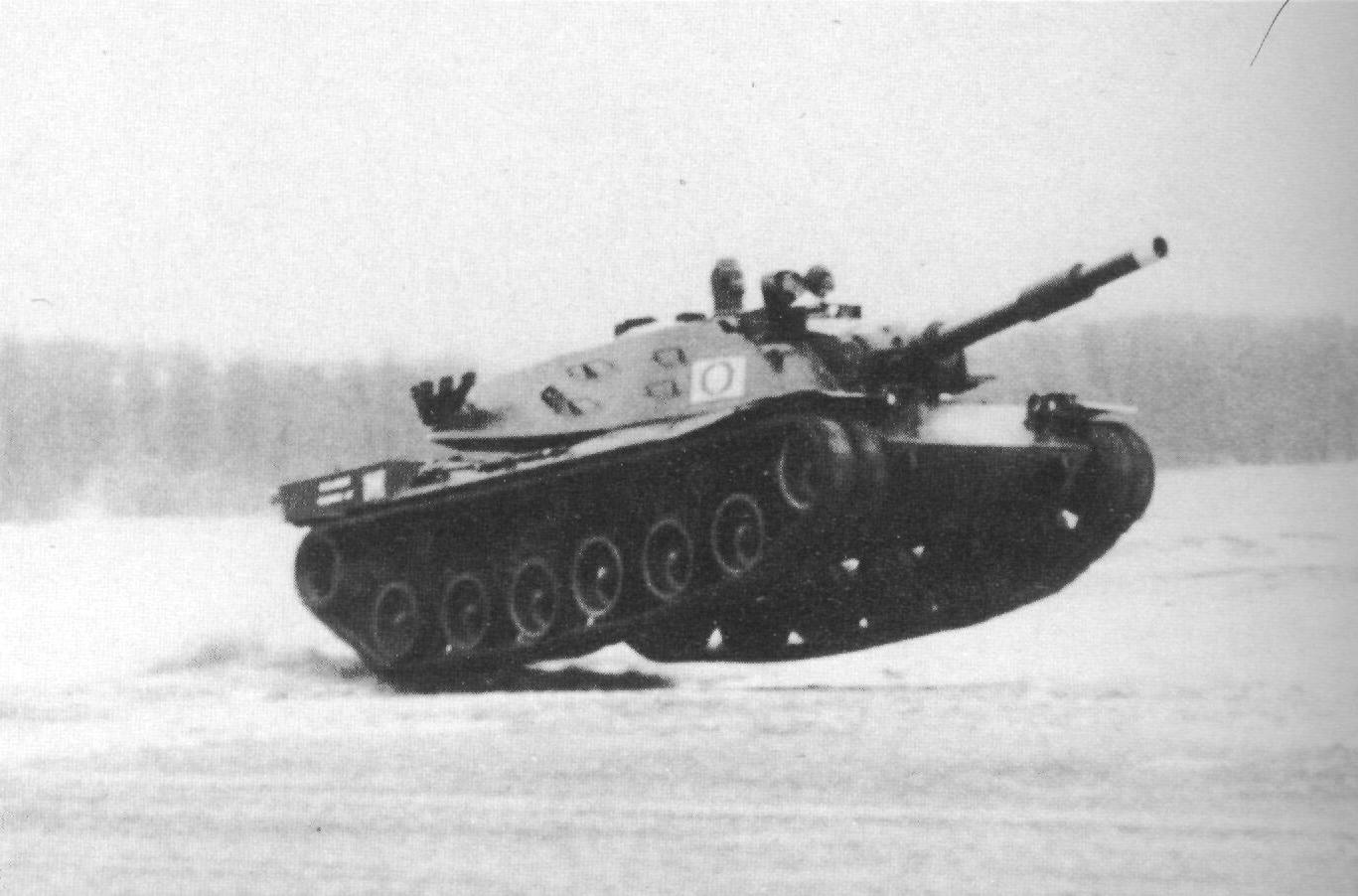
Pilot #2 at Aberdeen Proving Ground undergoing trials

A prototype series started in 1965, with two mild steel hull and six "complete" hulls of both the US and German versions, for a total of 14 hulls. The lower hull and drivetrain were tested in 1966, and full trials began in 1968.

The tank proved to have better mobility than the M60: it was considerably faster, both in all-out speed and, more importantly, with about three times the acceleration. All of this led to a reduction in the time the tank was exposed to fire, in testing it was 1/3 less likely to be seen while maneuvering than the M60, and it could run a 10 km (6.2 mi) obstacle course in 30% less time.

A year behind schedule, the U.S. and Germany debuted their MBT-70s publicly in October 1967. An American prototype was displayed outside the Association of the United States Army in Washington. The German demonstration in Augsburg ended prematurely: smoke poured out of the tank after the turret's hydraulics malfunctioned. Observers were nonetheless impressed and German officials said the tank was on track to replace all M48 Pattons of the Bundeswehr by 1972.

=== Problems ===
An unanticipated problem was that the drivers complained of disorientation when the turret was rotated, contrary to the predictions of the designers who felt the location of the cupola near the center of rotation would eliminate this effect. The XM150 gun/launcher had serious problems. The similar but smaller XM81 gun/launcher mounted on the M551 Sheridan proved to be just as troublesome. There were also several problems with the ammunition. The caseless design made conventional tank rounds too vulnerable to water. Wet rounds expanded so they would not fit into the barrel anymore or left hard residues after being fired.

The auto-loader was capable of handling the Shillelagh missile without problems, but the combustible cases of the tank rounds could be deformed by it. As is often a problem with caseless ammunition, the ammunition also had a tendency to "cook-off", or fire prematurely, due to heat build-up in the barrel from previously fired rounds. The attempted solution, to only carry a single round with the balance in missiles, also proved unacceptable. Deployment of the 20mm anti-aircraft cannon also proved difficult and the weapon itself was overcomplicated and nearly impossible to use effectively.

Another problem of the MBT-70 was the increasing weight. While at the beginning of the project, a weight of some 46.3 tonnes (45.6 long tons; 51.0 short tons) was projected, it increased to 54 tonnes (53 long tons; 60 short tons) during development, which forced the designers to redesign some elements, so that finally a weight of 50.3 tonnes (49.5 long tons; 55.4 short tons) was reached, still higher than required. This meant that the MBT-70 would require its own armored recovery vehicles and bridge-launching systems. Germany became concerned with the excessive weight of the tank. One solution proposed removing radiation hardening from the turret, but this called into question the wisdom of the driver-in-turret configuration, which was intended to protect the crew in the event of a nuclear blast.

Commentators on the MBT-70 typically assert that though it was innovative in many respects, the project was ruined by the use of too many untried and unproven technologies. Senator James W. Fulbright quipped that to drive an MBT-70, a master's degree from a technical institute would be required.

== Cancellation ==
By 1969 the MBT-70 cost five times what was projected, at $1 million a unit. Originally the planned costs of the MBT-70 project were as low as $80 million (or 292.8 million DM), but in 1969 the project had already cost $303 million (nearly 1.1 billion DM). West Germany's part alone of this was about $130 million (475.8 million DM), which in itself was more than the original planned total costs of the project.

Frustrated with the lack of resolution to the tank's technical problems and excessive weight, Germany announced in April 1969 that it would cut back on its purchase of the MBT-70 and begin development of a new tank.

A July 1969 House Armed Services subcommittee report on the troubled M551 Sheridan asked that funding for the MBT-70 be withheld pending a comprehensive review of the program. In August 1969, Senator Thomas Eagleton was granted a request that the Government Accounting Office undertake an audit of the program.

The GAO recommended the tank development program proceed on an austere basis. Acting on this recommendation, Deputy Secretary of Defense David Packard agreed to withhold $25 million earmarked for the production of six prototypes while the DoD completed a review of the project. Packard was ultimately persuaded by Army leaders that the American MBT-70 project was technically sound. The Army agreed that development would be better off without German cooperation. In January 1970, the Department of Defense ended its tank partnership with Germany and committed to forging ahead with its own design.

The U.S. spent $305.4 million on the MBT-70 and XM803 programs, while Germany spent $100 million.

Germany subsequently started the development of the "Keiler" tank on its own. Later this program would lead to the Leopard 2.

== XM803 ==
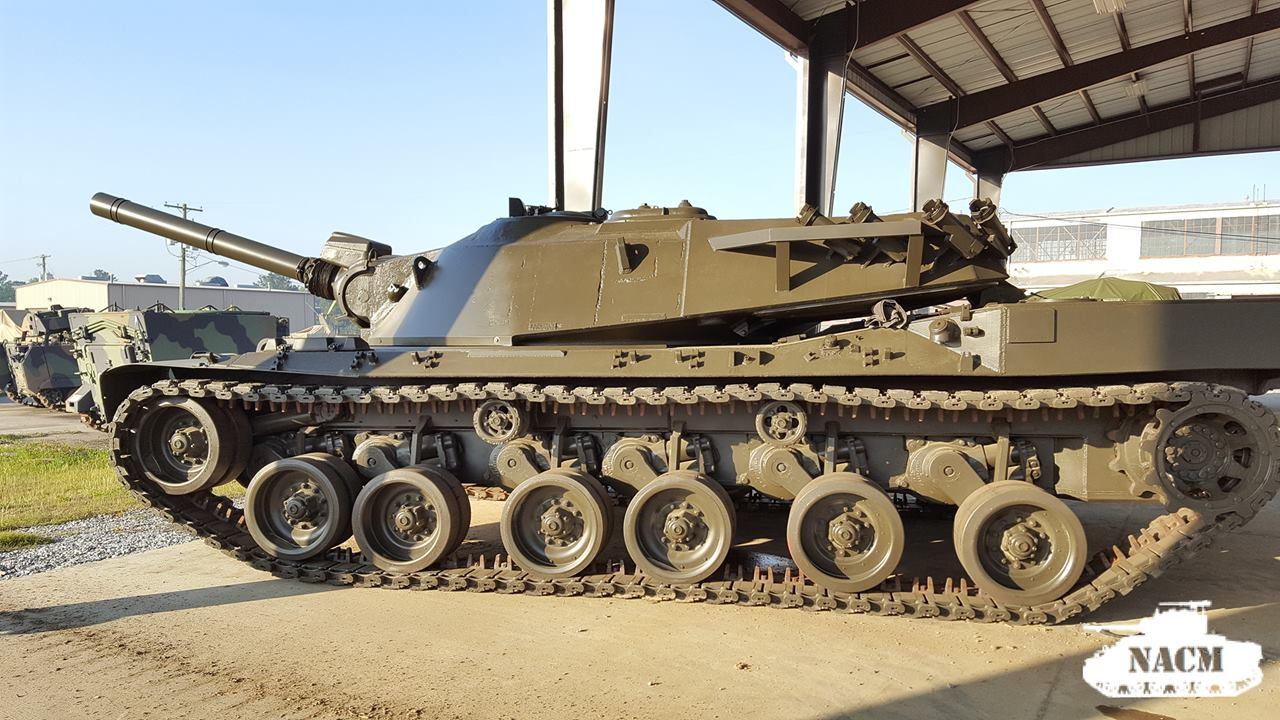
XM803 at the U.S. Army Armor & Cavalry Collection. Note the two return rollers, versus three on the MBT-70.

Work began on converting the existing MBT-70 design into a low-cost "austere" alternative that would use only American-made components, resulting in the visually similar XM803 prototype. Congress hoped to drive down the per-unit cost to $500,000–$600,000, saving $200,000 per tank versus the MBT-70.

The largest cost savings came from a switch to a less expensive steel armor plating. An American-made engine also reduced costs. The design was slightly heavier and slower. General Motors received a $16.5 million contract to develop the tank in July 1971. Systems were simplified or eliminated altogether to save costs. The XM150E5 gun-launcher was replaced with an XM150E6, which included a closed breech scavenging system. A 24-round General Motors autoloader was installed. Ammunition capacity was increased to 50 rounds. The commander's 20 mm cannon was replaced by a .50 caliber M85 machine gun. The driver's escape hatch was deleted and his television, as well as those of all the other crew, were eliminated. The Continental AVCR-1100-3B engine was derated to 1,250 horsepower (930 kW) at 2600 rpm and paired to a General Motors XHM-1500-2B transmission. A simplified National Water Lift hydropneumatic suspension was installed. Side skirts were installed, which allowed some armor to be removed from the hull. Meanwhile, the U.S. Army studied installing a gas-turbine AGT-1500 generating 1,500 horsepower (1,100 kW) (this was the engine that would come to power the M1 Abrams).

Only one of the two pilot vehicles authorized for construction was completed. In addition, a surrogate vehicle based on the components of MBT-70 pilot #4, the M60 and the M88 armored recovery vehicle, was constructed.

These changes were ultimately insufficient to allay concerns about the tank's cost. In September 1971, an amendment by Senator Thomas Eagleton was defeated that would cut $35.3 million in funding for XM803 prototype production. but in December 1971, Congress canceled the tank in the defense appropriation bill. The bill appropriated $20 million for cancelation costs and $20 million for the development of a new tank program. This became the XM1 design project, which led to the production-model M1 Abrams tank.

== Comparative table ==
	MBT-70	Kpz-70	XM803
Country	United States	West Germany	United States
Number of prototypes	14	7	1
Weight, combat loaded	51,700 kg (114,000 lb)	50,400 kg (111,100 lb)	51,700 kg (114,000 lb)
Engine	Continental AVCR-1100-3A	Daimler-Benz/MTU MB-873 Ka-500	Continental AVCR-1100-3B
Displacement	22.2 L	39.8 L	22.2 L
Net horsepower	1,475 hp (1,100 kW) at 2800 rpm	1,500 hp (1,100 kW) at 2600 rpm	1,250 hp (930 kW) at 2600 rpm
Net torque	3,728 N⋅m (2,750 lb⋅ft) at 2200 rpm	4,300 N⋅m (3,170 lb⋅ft) at 1950 rpm	unknown
Transmission	Renk HSWL 354/2		General Motors XHM-1500-2B
Top speed	68 km/h (42 mph)	68 km/h (42 mph)	64.37 km/h (40.00 mph)
Range	645 km (401 mi)	580 km (360 mi)	643.7 km (400.0 mi)
Suspension	National Water Lift Model 812 (twin cylinder)	Frieseke & Höpfner Hydrop-Feder	National Water Lift (single cylinder)
Tracks	Diehl 170 double pin tracks		unknown
Tracks width	635 mm (25.0 in)		622 mm (24.5 in)
Main armament	XM150E5 152 mm gun/launcher		XM150E6 152 mm gun/launcher
Autoloader	Rh or GM	Rheinmetall (24 rounds)	General Motors (26 rounds)
Rate of fire	6 rounds/min (on the move, shells and missiles)	10 rounds/min (stopped, shells only)	8 rounds/min, (shells only)
152 mm ammunition carried	48	46	50
Secondary weapon	Rh-202 autocannon retractable into a capsule		M85 heavy machine gun mounted on top of the commander's stabilized day/night
Coaxial machine gun	General Electric M73	Rheinmetall MG3A1	General Electric M73

== Legacy ==
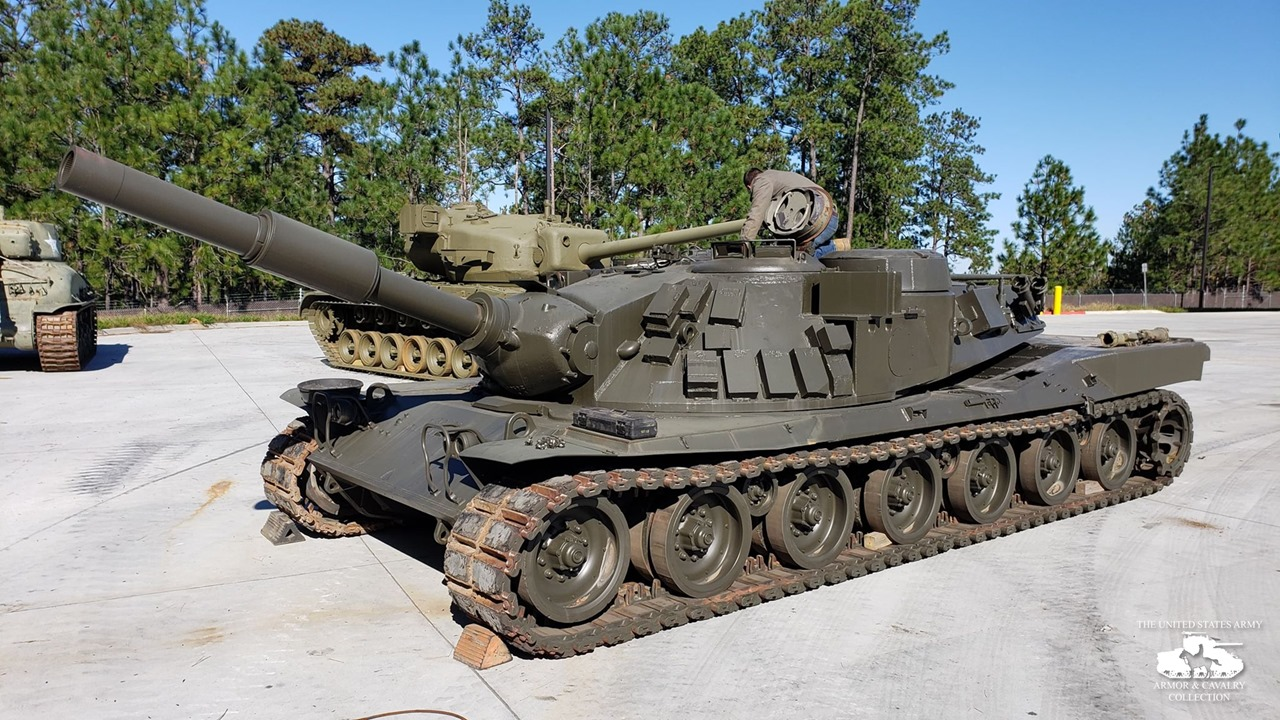
MBT-70 with suspension lowered at the U.S. Army Armor & Cavalry Collection

In a post-mortem report of his four years on the project, American program manager Brig. Gen. Bernard Luczak attributed the high cost of the tank to the difficulties of managing a joint program. Luczak claimed General Motors charged a premium for its defense contract work, which it considered insignificant compared to its burgeoning automotive business.

In the 1989 book King of the Killing Zone author Orr Kelly called the end of the MBT-70 program, "one of the most fortunate occurrences to befall the U.S. Army."

== Variants ==
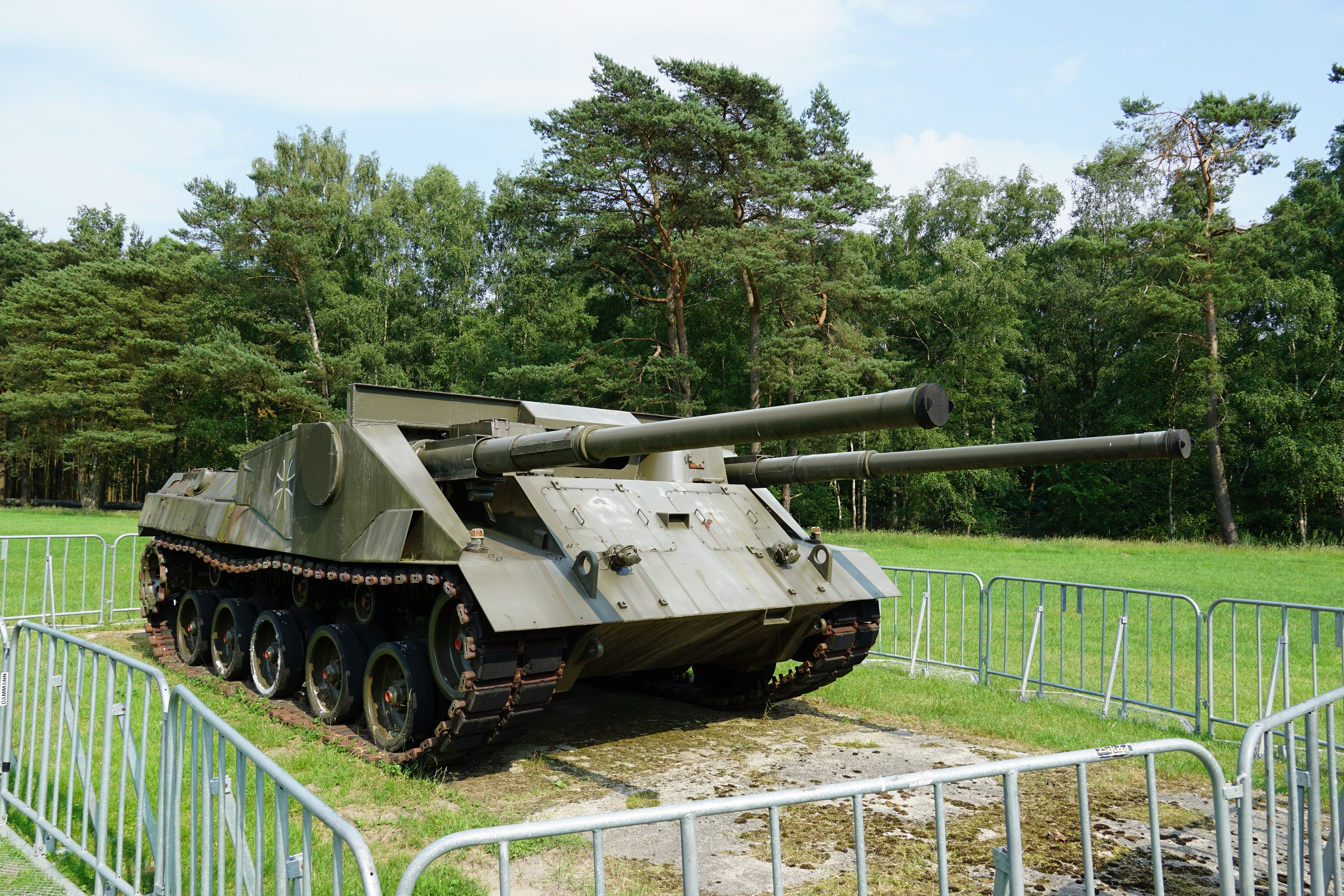
VT 1-1 at the Bundeswehr Technical Center for Weapons and Ammunition

- XM742 Recovery Vehicle – A proposed armored recovery vehicle.
- XM743 – A proposed armored vehicle-launched bridge layer carrying the 60-ton capacity XM744 double-folding bridge.
- XM745 Combat Engineer Vehicle – A proposed military engineering vehicle with four-man crew, 165 mm (alternatively 152 mm) demolition gun and a 25 mm autocannon.
- VT 1-1, a tank based on a shortened KPz 70 chassis.

== Surviving vehicles ==
Altogether 14 prototypes and test beds were built, two made of mild steel. Some of them have survived in museums and can still be visited today.

=== American prototypes ===
- One prototype is located at Fort Lee (military base) in Prince George County, Virginia. It was formerly at Aberdeen Proving Ground.
- One prototype is located in the Anniston Army Depot in Anniston, Alabama.
- Another prototype, as well as a prototype of the XM803, is located in the Armor Museum Restoration Yard at Fort Benning, Georgia.
- A mild steel prototype in bad condition could be seen in the Military Museum of Southern New England in Danbury, Connecticut until October 2019. Following the closure of the museum, it was sold for scrap metal. Only the turret remains.

=== German prototypes ===
- One prototype is located in the Deutsches Panzermuseum Munster
- Another is located in the Wehrtechnische Studiensammlung Koblenz
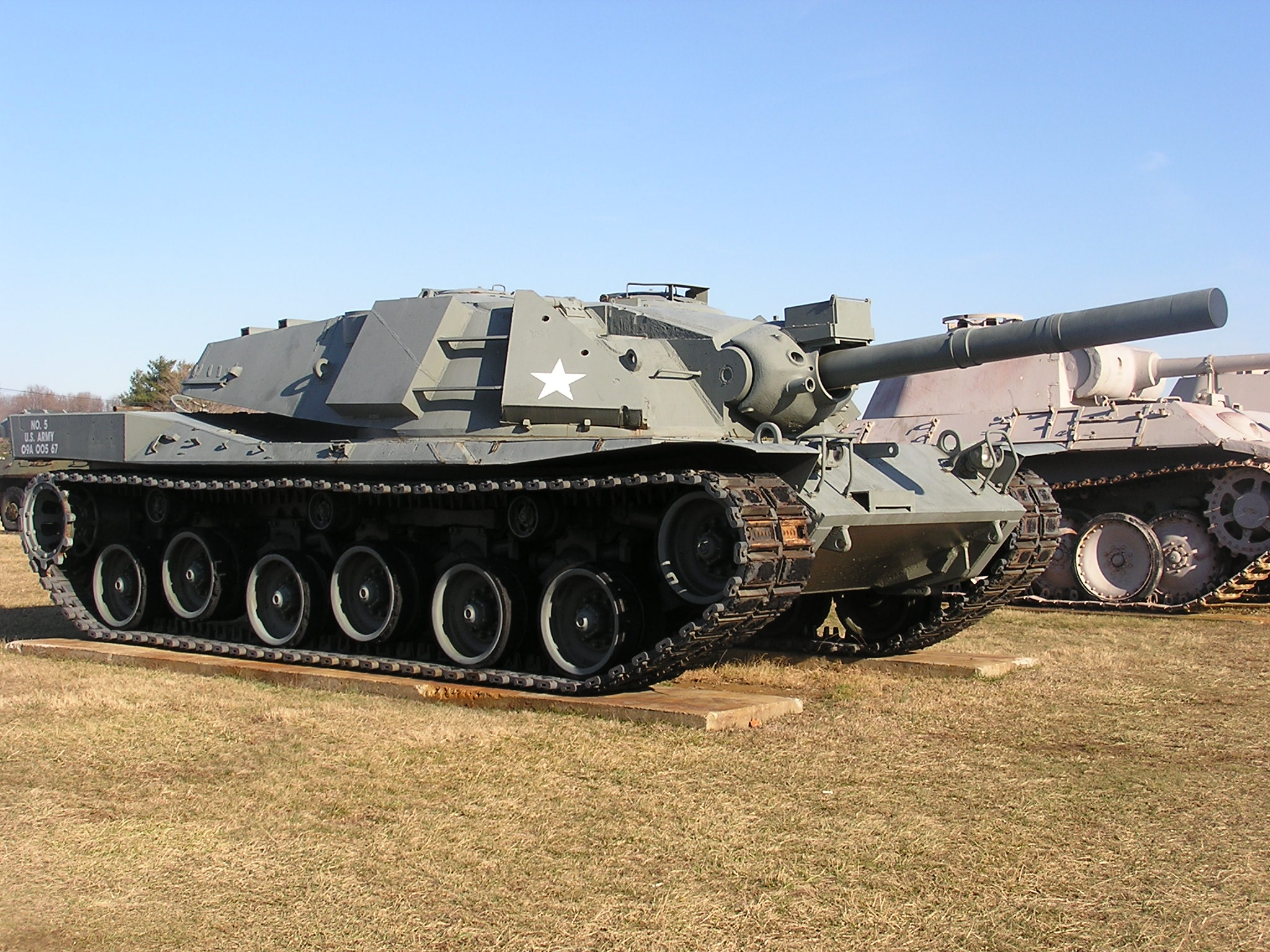
MBT-70 at Aberdeen Proving Ground

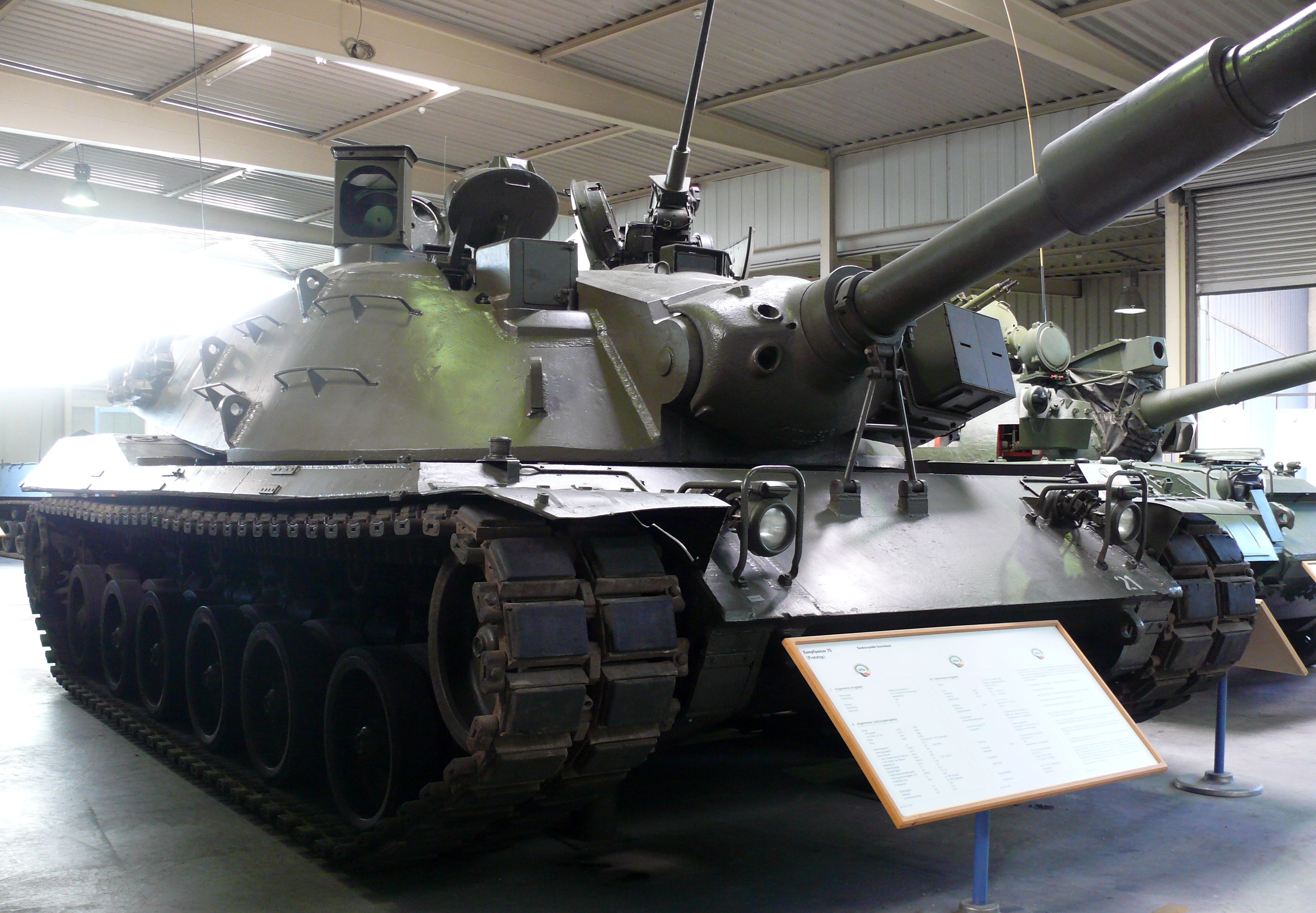
Kampfpanzer 70 at Koblenz

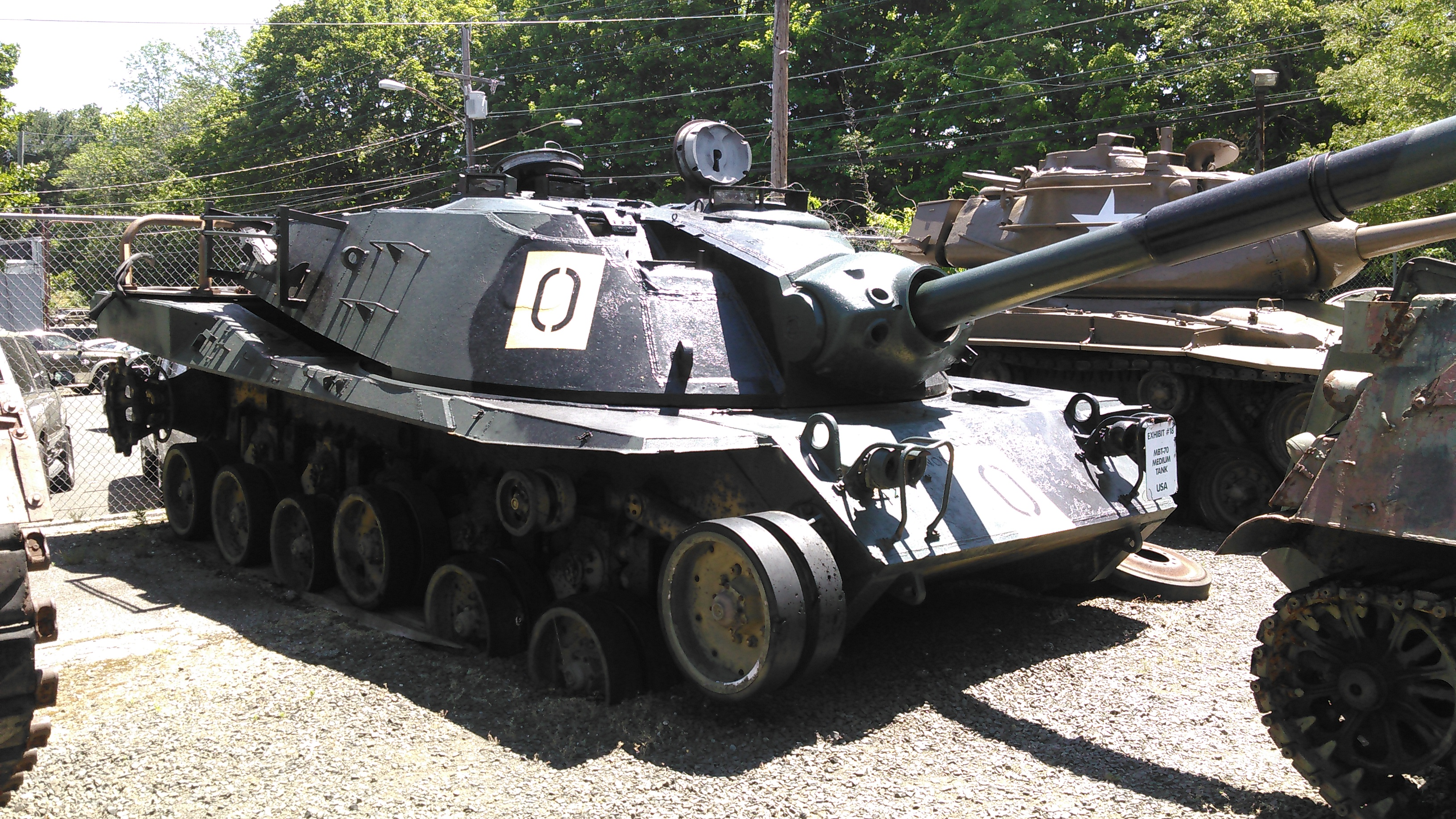
MBT-70 pilot #2 at Danbury, Connecticut

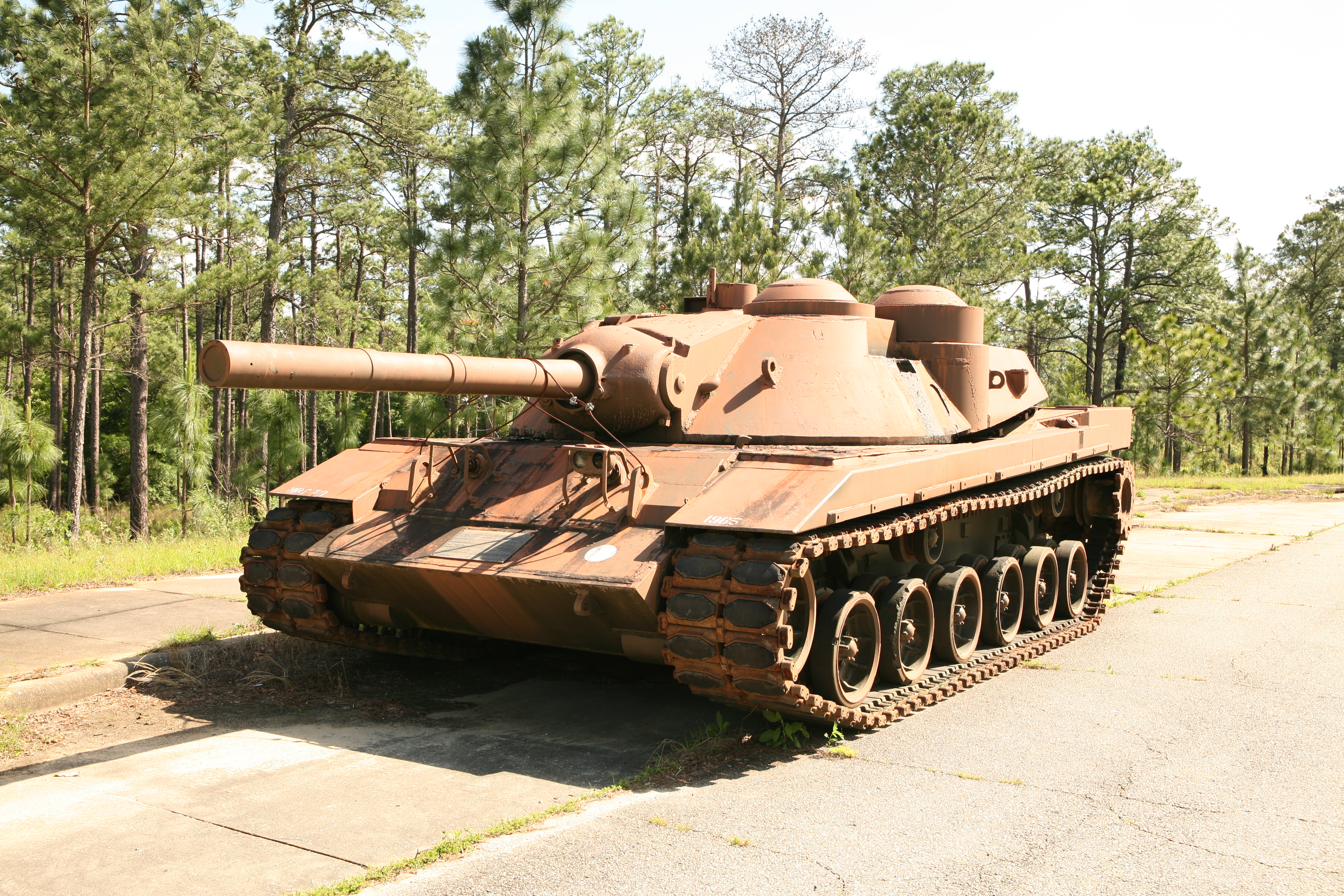
XM803 surrogate at the Armor and Cavalry Collection, Fort Benning, Georgia, made from the MBT-70 and M60 parts.

== See also ==
- VT tank – (West Germany)
- MBT-80 – (United Kingdom)
- Leopard 2 – (Germany)
- M1 Abrams – (United States)
- Main Ground Combat System – (Germany, France) to be produced in 2035.
