= Westernhagen =

German noble family

Westernhagen von Hagen
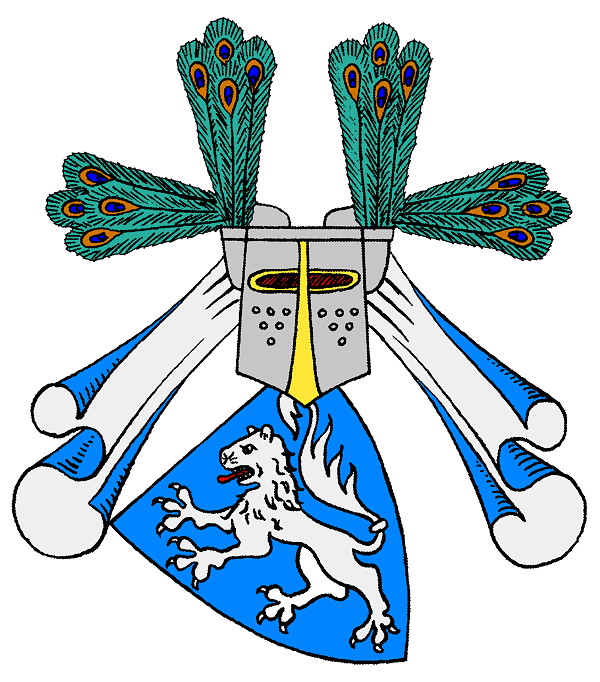
- A silver lion in blue, blue-silver helmet covers four, two posts and two bars, golden arrows.
- Country: Germany
- Origin: Lower Saxony
- Founded: 1258
- Titles: Junker

The House of Westernhagen is an old German noble family from Thuringia which originated in Lower Saxony. The first reference to the family was made in 1258. The original family name was von Hagen. The family acquired a fiefdom in 1283 and built Westernhagen Castle in Berlingerode, from which their name derives.

== History ==
The family is first mentioned in 1258 with Conradus and Hermannus Indagine (Latin for Hagen meaning hague, an area fortified and fenced with a hedge). From Hermannus an uninterrupted lingeage can be traced. The name changed from de Indagine to Hayn, then to Hagen and finally to Westernhagen.

The lords of Berlingerode in the Eichsfeld district had already built the old moated Castle Hagen (Westernhagen Castle) near Berlingerode by 1123, although it is first mentioned in documents in 1288. Around 1300 some relatives, probably tribally related to the lords of Berlingerode, built Castle Osternhagen (Eastern Hagen) at Hundeshagen. Some later members of this family named themselves after the old moated castle of Western Hagen after moving there. Westernhagen Castle was destroyed in 1525 during the German Peasants' War. The main seat of the family then became nearby Teistungen, which they had owned since 1283 and where they had built two tower houses that were later replaced by manor houses.

The family converted from Catholicism to Protestantism after the Reformation in the sixteenth century. Members of the family served in the Prussian military under Frederick the Great. In the twentieth century, most of the family properties were seized by the Communist government of East Germany. After the German reunification, the Oberhof manor and estate in Teistungen was re-purchased by Burghard von Westernhagen, the father of Princess Heinrich of Hanover.

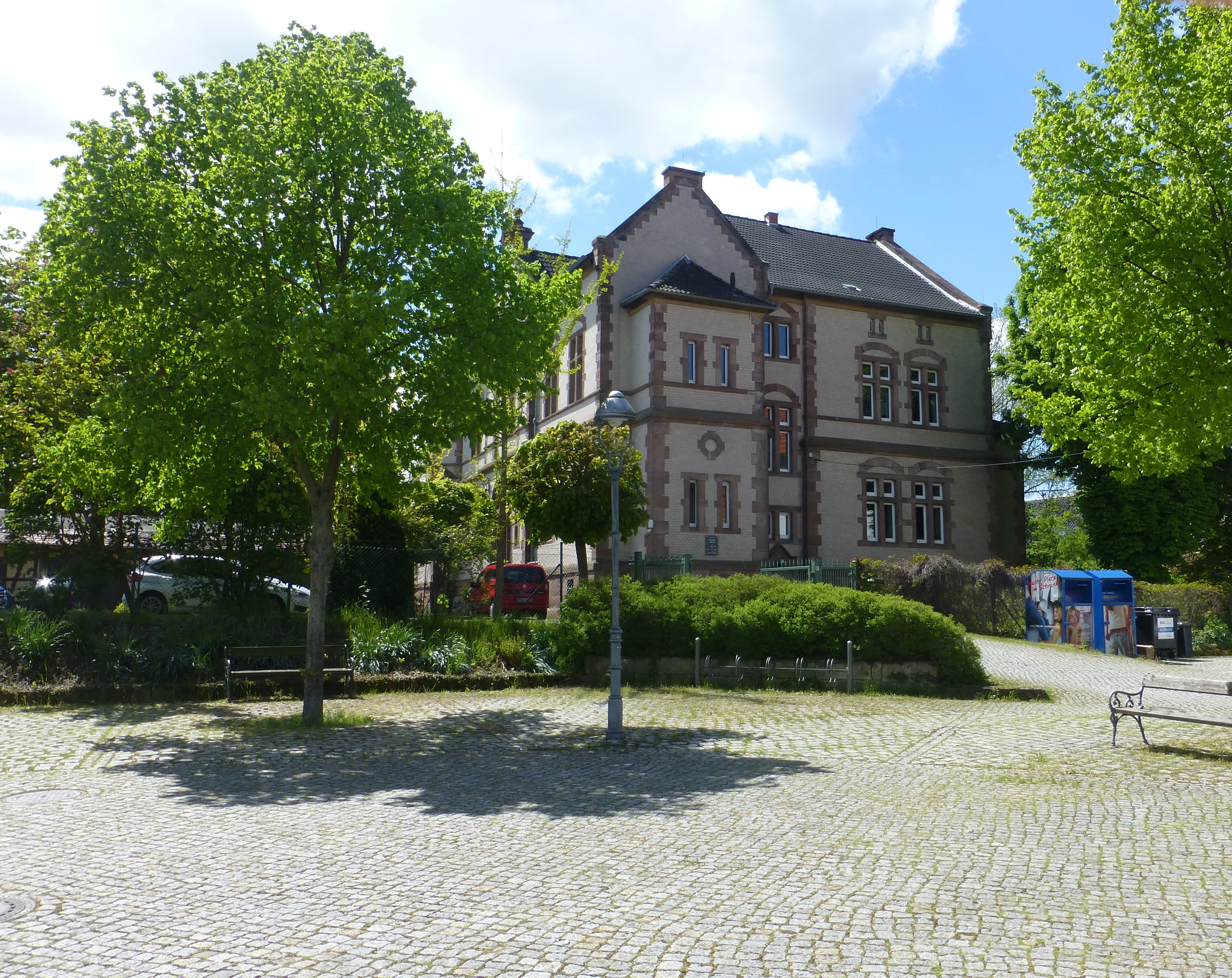
Teistungen, Oberhof (Upper court)

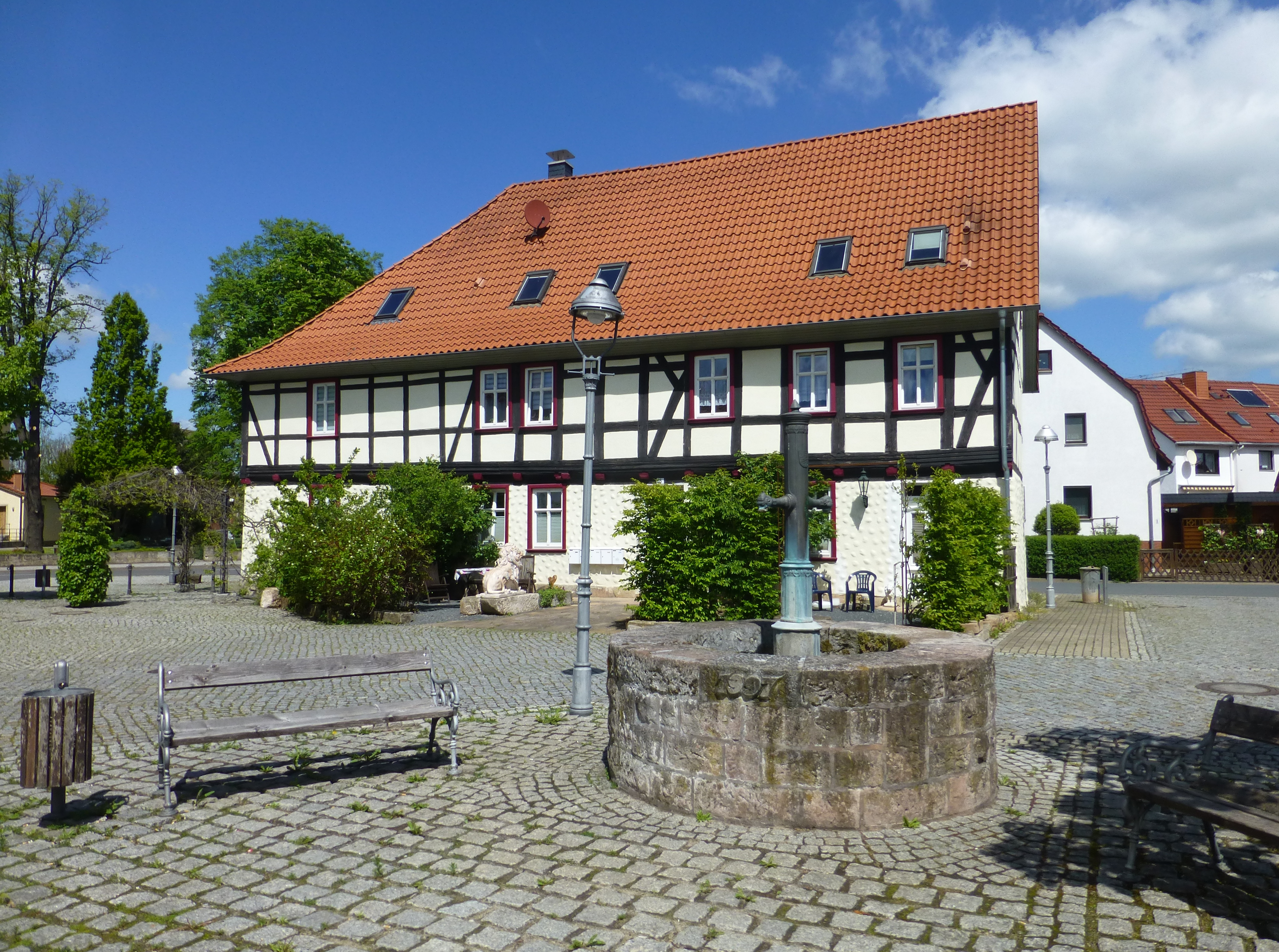
Teistungen, Unterhof (Lower court)

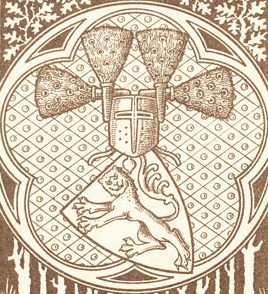
Coat of arms of the von Westernhagen family

== Notable family members ==
- Dörte von Westernhagen (born 1943), German writer
- Heinz von Westernhagen (1911–1945), German military officer
- Thilo von Westernhagen (1950-2014), German composer
- Thyra von Westernhagen (born 1973), German forester and wife of Prince Heinrich of Hanover
