= Royal tiger =

Royal tiger may refer to:

- Bengal tiger
- the Nazi-German tank King Tiger, see Tiger II
