= Heinz von Westernhagen =

German officer (1911–1945)

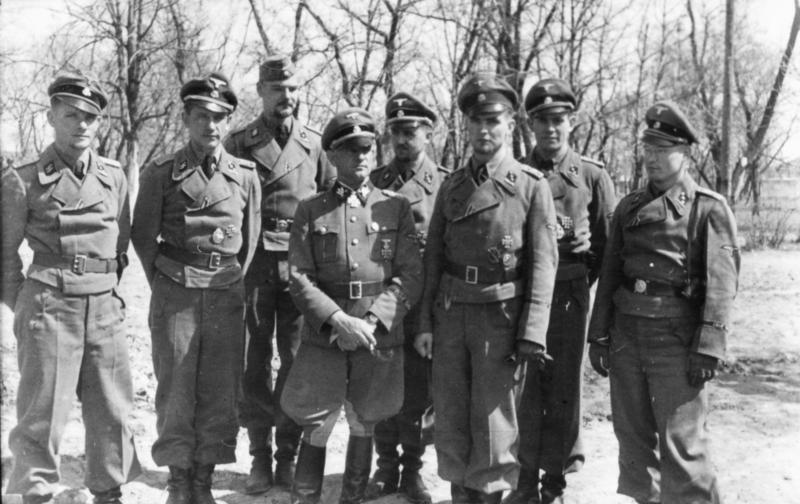
- Heinz von Westernhagen (first from left)
- Born: 29 August 1911; Riga, Latvia
- Died: 19 March 1945 (aged 33); Veszprém, Hungary
- Burial place: Veszprém, Hungary
- Relatives: Cristal Kiesselbach (sister), Michael Kiesselbach (nephew), Wilhelm Kiesselbach (nephew), Rolf Von Westernhagen (brother),Dörte von Westernhagen (daughter)
- Military career
- Allegiance: Nazi Germany
- Branch: Waffen-SS
- Service years: 1934–1945
- Rank: SS-Obersturmbannführer
- Nickname: Hein
- Units: 1st SS Division Leibstandarte SS Adolf Hitler; I SS Panzer Corps
- Commands: 501st (101st) SS Heavy Panzer Battalion
- Conflicts: World War II

Heinz von Westernhagen (29 August 1911 – 19 March 1945) was a SS-Obersturmbannführer in the Waffen-SS during World War II. He was a member of the Leibstandarte SS Adolf Hitler (LSSAH) and commander of the 501st (101st) SS Heavy Panzer Battalion.

== Early SS service ==
Westernhagen joined the Nazi Party in 1929 with membership number 174562, and later the SA. In April 1932, he joined the Allgemeine SS. He joined the SS-Verfügungstruppe on 1 October 1934 and assigned to a company of the Germania Regiment. In 1936, he took platoon commander training course at Dachau Training Area, where he became acquainted with Joachim Peiper. Afterwards Westernhagen was transferred to the Security Service (Sicherheitsdienst or SD) where he was an adjutant to Reinhard Heydrich.

== World War II ==
Assigned to SS Division Leibstandarte SS Adolf Hitler, Westernhagen took part in the fighting in the Netherlands, Belgium and France in 1940. Afterwards, Westernhagen was transferred back to the SD, returning to LSSAH in March 1941. During the Battle of Greece, he served in the staff of the Kampfgruppe Witt, commanded by then SS-Sturmbannführer Fritz Witt. On 1 June 1942 Westernhagen became the commander of Leibstandarte Sturmgeschütz (Assault Gun) Battalion. Westernhagen remained in this position until 5 August 1943 when he was appointed to command the 101st SS Heavy Panzer Battalion.

=== Battle of Kursk ===
Westernhagen's unit was to operate in the southern sector of the planned operation. The Assault Gun Battalion LSSAH commanded by Westernhagen was part of reinforced 2nd Panzergrenadier Regiment LSSAH; he sustained a head wound in the first day of the operation, on July 5. Westernhagen was evacuated that day, and later transferred to Berlin for additional surgery. The head injury sustained during Operation Zitadelle plagued Westernhagen for the rest of his life.

Westernhagen was appointed commander of the 101st SS Heavy Panzer Battalion on 19 July 1943. Further treatment of his head wound and subsequent participation in a training course for battalion commanders at the Armored Forces School in Paris delayed his arrival until 13 February 1944. The 101st SS Heavy Panzer Battalion was heavily engaged during the Normandy campaign, and lost virtually all its equipment in the retreat across France in August 1944. The remains of the unit were ordered to rest and completely refit with the new Tiger IIs. On 22 September 1944, it was redesignated as the 501st SS Heavy Panzer Battalion.

=== Battle of Normandy ===
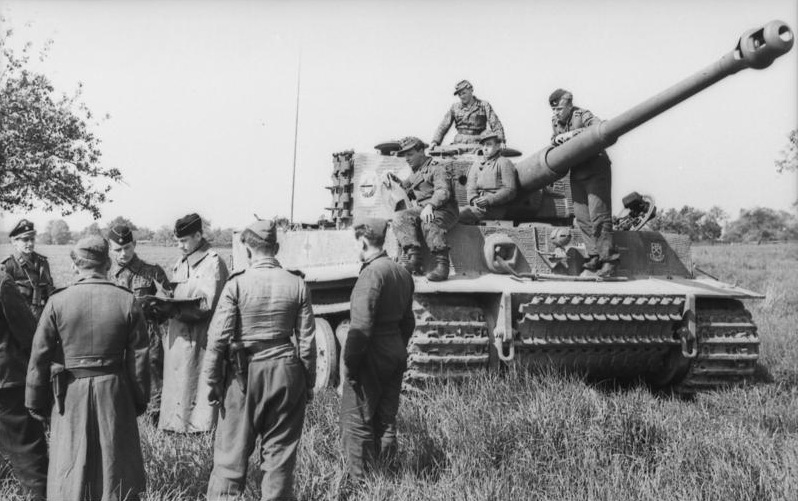
Westernhagen (in camouflage uniform) at a practice in May 1944 near east of Amiens, France

On 6 June 1944, the battalion was at Beauvais, 70 kilometres (43 mi) north of Paris. On that day in the early morning hours of 0600, it was placed on alert. Between 0200 and 0300 hours on 7 June, the Tiger battalion set off for the invasion front, under its own power, due to the extensive damage to the railway network northwest of Paris. Initially, the Tigers drove through Gournay-en-Bray to Les Andelys. The bridge at Les Andelys to cross Seine was badly damaged, the battalion had to move through Paris. In an effective bit of propaganda, the Tigers rolled along the Champs-Elysées, passing the Arc de Triomphe to Versailles. The march continued on to Falaise through Dreux, Verneuil and Argentan in the following days.

The entire road march was an arduous and strenuous journey, in the area of Allied air superiority; starting from day one the march was often strafed by Allied fight-bombers and casualties mounted. Tigers could only move at night with a single tank movement, that is one tank at a time with lengthy intervals between vehicles up to several hundred meters. The road march was nearly 450 kilometres (280 mi) in distance, but took the battalion six days to reach the battle area. By the time the battalion has reached its designated assembly area during the night of 12 June 1944, it had suffered total casualties of twenty-seven, including nine killed. The long road march had also caused mechanical problems and failures to the Tigers; of its theoretical strength of fourteen tanks, the 1st company ended with eight tanks; and the 2nd company, six. The 1st company assembled at Noyers (8 kilometres (5.0 mi) northeast of Villers-Bocage); the 2nd company assembled in a defile south of Montbrocq (2 kilometres (1.2 mi) northeast of Villers-Bocage); the 3rd company was still held up farther to rear; von Westernhagen's battalion command post was established at Baron-sur-Odon. The battalion was immediately ordered to cover the left flank of the I. SS Panzer Corps, the crews had no rest.

Battle of Villers-Bocage

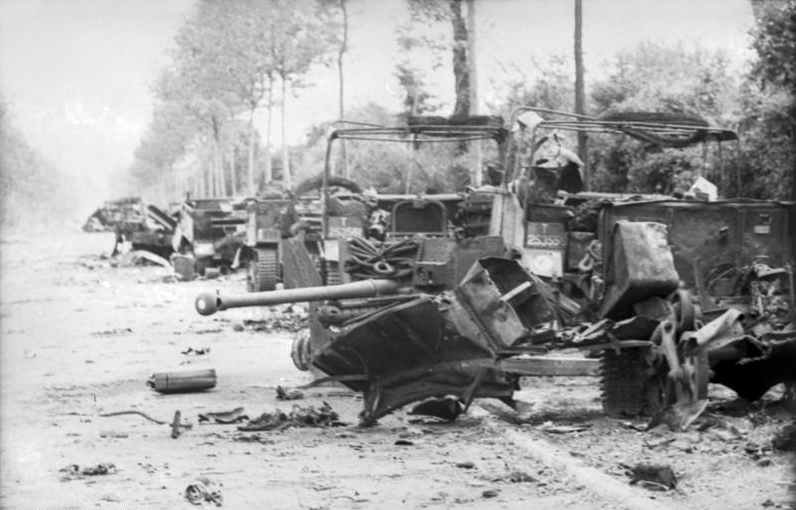
The wreckage of the British transport column, and an anti-tank gun, that Wittmann engaged.

In the days following the Allied D-Day landings of 6 June, both British and Germans regarded control of Caen as vital to the Normandy battle. When a 12 kilometres (7.5 mi) gap opened up between the 352nd Infantry Division and Panzer Lehr Division, the British 7th Armoured Division (Desert Rats) was given the mission to exploit through this gap and encircle Caen from the south-west to form what Montgomery termed the 'right hook'.

At 08:30 on 13 June 1944, the 22nd Armoured Brigade entered Villers-Bocage. The advancement conducted without additional reconnaissance was a costly mistake for the British as they were oblivious to the presence of 2nd Company, 101st SS Heavy Panzer Battalion. The Company commander, SS-Obersturmführer Michael Wittmann, engaged the British with a lone Tiger tank first along N175 as he advanced towards Villers-Bocage, and later in the town itself, until his Tiger was immobilized from an antitank gun. The British withdrawal indicated the end of the post D-Day "scramble for ground" and the start of the a grinding attritional battle for Caen. Westernhagen then went on a convalescent leave to deal with the aftermath of his head wound.

=== Battle of the Bulge ===
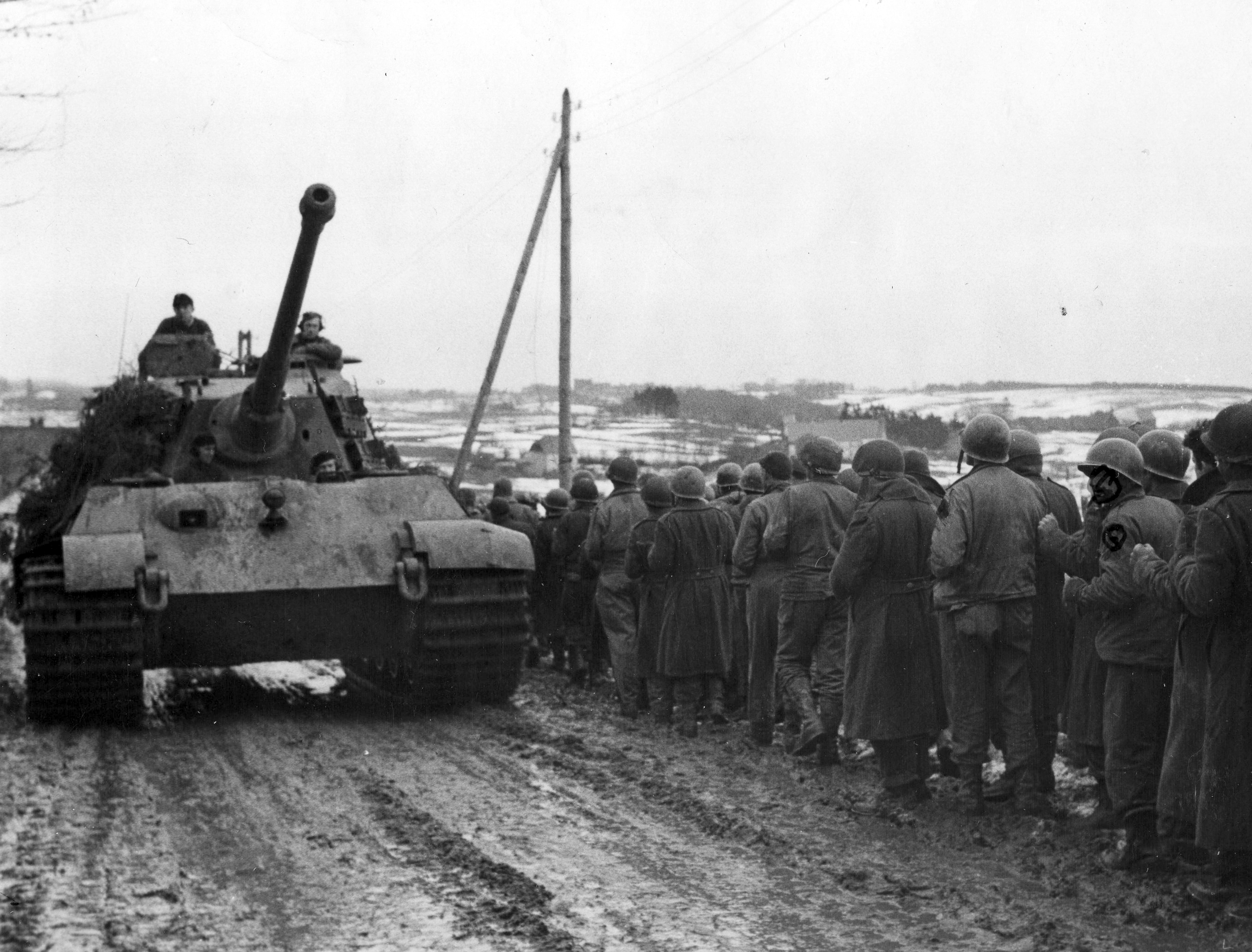
Tiger II tank from the 501st Heavy Panzer Battalion passes a column of American GIs taken prisoner day of the Battle of the Bulge.

On 21 November 1944, Westernhagen returned to the battalion, now designated as the 501st SS Heavy Panzer Battalion. The plan for the Ardennes Offensive was to deliver a powerful blow and to regain the initiative on the Western Front. The main attack would be led by the 6th Panzer Army advancing from Monschau to Losheim, crossing the Meuse on both sides of Liège and then advance on Antwerp. The advance roads were assigned to the 1st SS Panzer Division Leibstandarte and the 12th SS Panzer Division Hitlerjugend. Leibstandarte was to use Roads D and E, Hitlerjugend Roads A, B and C.

The 501st SS Heavy Panzer Battalion was at full strength except for the 4th (Light) Company. Each panzer company possessed 14 Tiger IIs, gave a total strength of 45. However the battalion was plagued with maintenance problems and mechanical breakdowns, it is probable that only around 30-35 Tigers actually participated in the initial advance of Kampfgruppe Peiper. Due to the blitzkrieg action KG Peiper needed as the spearhead of the offensive, considering the 68t Tigers could sustain a speed of only 38 km/h, and with rough terrain and road conditions, the Tiger battalions were placed to the rear of the march column from the beginning, forming the rearguard. However, after leaving the hilly section of the offensive zone the Tiger Battalion was to be moved forward and spearhead the breakthrough to the Meuse.

On 16 December 1944, due to 12th Volksgrenadier's (VG) slow progress in breaking through the American lines thus opening a gap for Route D, the Tiger battalion just started to roll out from its assembly area at Tondorf. Wessel's 1st Company was in the lead, which was brought up from the rear. Panzergruppe Peiper evacuated Stoumont and Cheneux in the early evening hours of 21 December 1944 and withdrew his entire battle group to La Gleize, the small village thus became the center point of the pocket. The breakout began at 0200 hours on 24 December 1944; of the approximately 3000 men of Panzergruppe Peiper, 850 of them who could still walk, including wounded, assembled to begin the breakout. Among them were Westernhagen and other members of the battalion. In the morning hour of 25 December 1944 he and his group has reached the Leibstandarte Division's command post in Wanner after a 33 hour march.

== Death ==
On 19 March 1945, Westernhagen received an order to leave the battalion and join the officer reserve; SS-Sturmbannführer Heinz Kling assumed command. According to the official statement, Westernhagen was killed by an aircraft bomb, however Wolfgang Schneider in his book Tigers in Combat (Volume Two), with almost daily activity account of 101st/501st SS Heavy Panzer Battalion, has clearly indicated that Westerhagen committed suicide after being relieved as battalion commander: "In fact, he shoots himself with his own pistol."
