= Thyra von Westernhagen =

German princess (born 1973)

Thyra
- Princess Heinrich of Hanover
- Born: Thyra Sixtina Donata von Westernhagen; 14 August 1973 (age 52); Oldenburg, Lower Saxony, West Germany
- Spouse: Prince Heinrich of Hanover (m. 1999)
- Issue: Prince Albert; Princess Eugenia; Prince Julius
Names
- Thyra Sixtina Donata Prinzessin zu Hanover
- House: Westernhagen
- Father: Burkhard von Westernhagen
- Mother: Uta Maria von Pape
- Occupation: Forester

Princess Heinrich of Hanover (née Thyra von Westernhagen; born 14 August 1973) is a German forester. As the wife of Prince Heinrich of Hanover, she is a princess of the House of Hanover.

== Early life and family ==
Thyra von Westernhagen was born on 14 August 1973 in Oldenburg, West Germany. She is the daughter of Burghard von Westernhagen, a medical doctor, and Uta Maria von Pape. By birth she is a member of the von Westernhagen family, a Junker family who were part of the landed nobility of Thuringia.

== Personal life ==
Von Westernhagen studied forestry at university. She married Prince Heinrich of Hanover on 30 April 1999 at St. Andrew's Church on her family's estate in Teistungen. She gave birth to their first child, Prince Albert, on 14 December 1999. On 19 July 2001 she gave birth to their second child, Princess Eugenia. On 22 February 2006 she gave birth to their third child, Prince Julius.

In 2011 von Westernhagen filed a legal complaint against German actress Désirée Nick for slander and insult. The Göttingen district court rejected the complaint in 2012. Von Westernhagen is the stepmother of Oskar Nick, her husband's son through his prior relationship with Désirée Nick.

In July 2017 she attended the wedding of Ernst August, Hereditary Prince of Hanover and Ekaterina Malysheva in Hanover.
