= Thilo von Westernhagen =

German composer

Thilo von Westernhagen (14 January 1950 – 11 January 2014) was a German composer and pianist.

== Biography ==
Thilo von Westernhagen was born on 14 January 1950 in Preetz, Schleswig-Holstein. His father, Wolfgang von Westernhagen, was a dentist. He was a member of the von Westernhagen family, who were part of the German minor nobility. He attended the University of Kiel where he studied dentistry before switching to music. He composed classical music and jazz music. He also composed scores for the 1980 television film Geheime Mission, the 1981 television films Don Quixote's Children and Beate und Mareile, the 1982 film Domino, the 1986 television film Storm, der Schimmelreiter, and for two episodes of the television crime series Tatort. He married Monika Borchfeldt and had two daughters. He died on 11 January 2014 in Lübeck.
