= 101st SS Heavy Panzer Battalion =

German heavy tank battalion in the Waffen-SS during World War II

101st SS Heavy Panzer Battalion 501st SS Heavy Panzer Battalion
- Schwere SS-Panzerabteilung 101 (renumbered: Schwere SS-Panzerabteilung 501)
- Active: 19 July 1943 – May 1945
- Country: Nazi Germany
- Branch: Waffen-SS
- Type: Panzer
- Role: Armoured warfare
- Size: Battalion, up to 45 tanks
- Part of: I SS Panzer Corps
- Equipment: Tiger I, Tiger II

Commanders
- Notable commanders: Heinz von Westernhagen; Heinrich Kling

Insignia
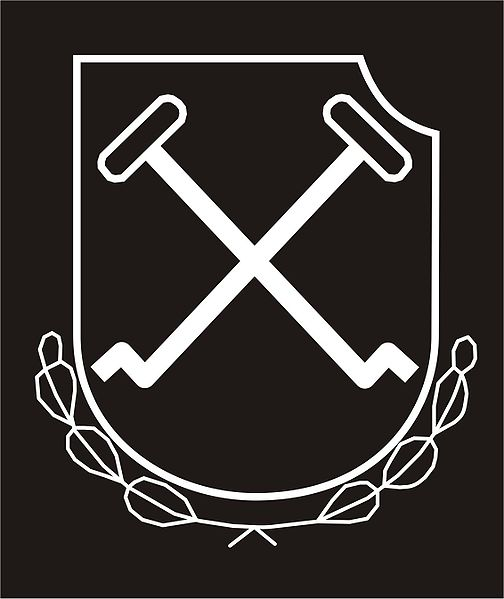
- Identification symbol

101st Heavy SS Panzer Battalion (German: Schwere SS-Panzerabteilung 101) was a German heavy tank battalion in the Waffen-SS during World War II. With the introduction of new Tiger II tanks in late 1944, the unit was renumbered as the 501st Heavy SS Panzer Battalion (German: Schwere SS-Panzerabteilung 501).

== Operational history ==
The battalion was created on July 19, 1943, as a part of the I SS Panzer Corps, by forming two new heavy tank companies consisting of Tiger I tanks and incorporating the 13th (Heavy) Company of the 1st SS Panzer Regiment. It was attached to 1st SS Panzer Division Leibstandarte and sent to Italy on August 23, 1943, where it stayed until mid-October. The 1st and 2nd company were then sent to the Eastern Front while the rest of the unit stayed in the West.

With the anticipated Allied invasion of Western Europe approaching, elements of the battalion in the East were ordered to the West in April 1944. On June 1, 1944, the battalion was located near Beauvais, north-west of Paris. Of its 45 Tigers, 37 were operational and eight more were under repair. With the D-Day landings on June 6, it was ordered to Normandy where it arrived on June 12 and 13. Fighting its first battle on 13 June, Kompanie 2, led by Michael Wittmann inflicted severe damage on the British in Villers-Bocage, resulting in the ending of Operation Perch. The battalion lost 15 of its 45 Tigers by July 5, including in the Battle of Villers-Bocage.

At this time the unit's surplus crews began outfitting with the new Tiger II tanks. By August 7 the division left in Normandy had 25 Tigers of which 21 were operational. On August 8, 1944, three of its seven Tigers, committed to a counter-attack near Saint-Aignan-de-Cramesnil, were destroyed by British Sherman Fireflies, and two more were destroyed by the 27th Canadian Armoured Regiment, killing Michael Wittmann. The battalion lost virtually all its remaining Tigers in the Falaise pocket and the subsequent German retreat from France.

On September 9, the remains of the unit were ordered to rest and refit with the new Tiger IIs. With this change on September 22, 1944, it was redesignated the 501st Heavy SS Panzer Battalion. On March 15, 1945, it reported a strength of 32 tanks, of which eight were operational. Four days later, Heinrich Kling was appointed as commander of the unit.

== Commanders ==
- SS-Sturmbannführer Heinz von Westernhagen (19 July 1943 - 8 November 1943)
- SS-Obersturmführer Otto Leiner (8 November 1943 - 13 February 1944)
- SS-Oberführer Heinz von Westernhagen (13 February 1944 - 20 March 1945)
- SS-Sturmbannführer Heinrich Kling (20 March - 8 May 1945)

== See also ==
- SS Panzer Division order of battle
- Panzer Division
