= Dörte von Westernhagen =

German writer (born 1943)

Dörte von Westernhagen (born 5 August 1943) is a German writer who wrote a book about her father, Heinz von Westernhagen, an SS functionary and Waffen-SS commander of the Nazi era.

Westernhagen was born in Perleberg, now in Prignitz, in 1943. She is descended from a Prussian Junker family, the Westernhagen, and daughter of Heinz von Westernhagen. She studied in Berlin, and earned a doctorate of law. She worked in the administration of Baden-Württemberg, until she decided to write her own story. Her book "Kinder der Täter" (The Perpetrators' Children) made quite a round in Germany when it was published in 1987. The book was immediately recognized as one of the first attempts to get the Nazi children out of their parents' shadow.

Westernhagen starts her narrative with her own childhood. Then her father takes over. Her father was a colonel in the Leibstandarte. He was shot through his head in Hungary in her first year. The book is about his daughter's sorrow. In the small-typed appendix she returns to her own childhood memories and those of other German NS-children. The importance of Westernhagen's work lies in the fact that she was the first European NS-child to discuss her father both as a personally brave man and a war criminal.
