= Heinrich Prinz von Hannover =

German prince (born 1961)

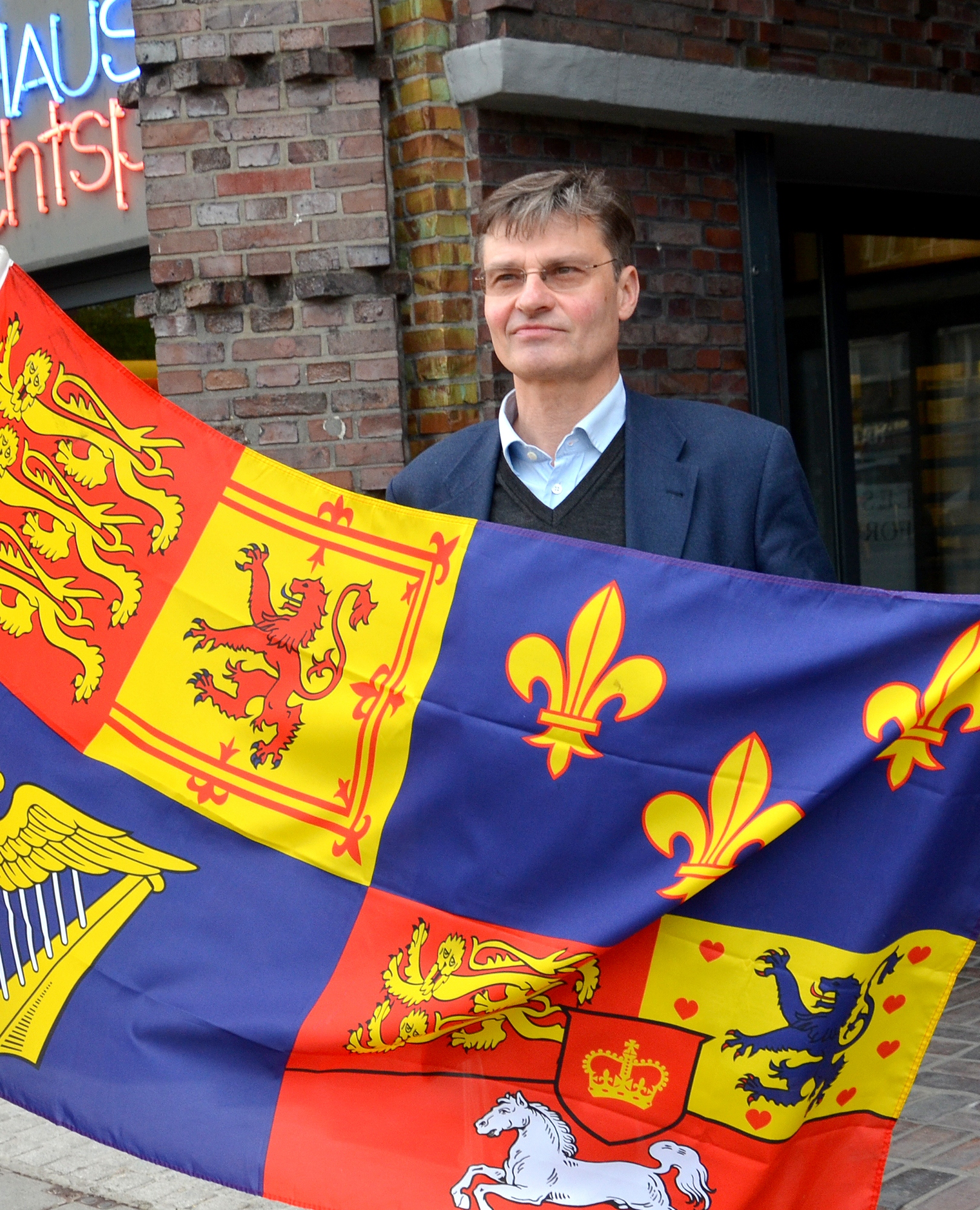
- Prince Heinrich with a banner bearing the arms of King George I of Great Britain
- Born: 29 April 1961 (age 65); Hanover, Lower Saxony, West Germany
- Spouse: Thyra von Westernhagen (m. 1999)
- Issue: Oskar Nick (illegitimate); Prince Albert; Princess Eugenia; Prince Julius
Names
- Heinrich Julius Christian Otto Friedrich Franz Anton Günter Prinz von Hannover
- House: Hanover
- Father: Ernest Augustus, Hereditary Prince of Brunswick
- Mother: Princess Ortrud of Schleswig-Holstein-Sonderburg-Glücksburg

Heinrich Prinz von Hannover (born 29 April 1961) is a German publisher. He is the managing director of MatrixMedia.

== Early life ==
Heinrich is the youngest child of Ernest Augustus, Hereditary Prince of Brunswick, and his first wife Princess Ortrud of Schleswig-Holstein-Sonderburg-Glücksburg. He was born in Hanover, Lower Saxony, Germany. His eldest brother, Prince Ernest Augustus of Hanover, is the present head of the House of Hanover.

== Professional life ==
Heinrich founded, owns and manages the publishing company MatrixMedia Verlag in Göttingen. The company publishes history books, mostly on the local history of the state of Lower Saxony, of which the predecessor states were the Kingdom of Hanover and the Duchy of Brunswick, and the history of the House of Welf. The company publishes books, monographs, historiographies, memoirs, illustrated books and films. He also operates a website on the House of Welf called Welfen.de.

== Personal life ==
Heinrich was in a relationship with cabaret artist Désirée Nick for 17 years. The couple have a son, born in 1996:

- Oscar Nick (born 29 September 1996)

In 1999 he married Thyra Sixtina Donata von Westernhagen, with whom he has three children. They are:

- Prince Albert (born 14 December 1999)
- Princess Eugenia (born 19 July 2001)
- Prince Julius (born 22 February 2006)
