= Heinrich Kling =

Waffen-SS commander (1913–1951)

- Born: 10 September 1913; Kassel, Hessen, German Empire
- Died: 30 September 1951 (aged 38); Lake Constance, West Germany
- Military career
- Allegiance: Nazi Germany
- Branch: Waffen-SS
- Service years: 1933–45
- Rank: Sturmbannführer
- Nickname: Heinz
- Unit: SS Division Leibstandarte
- Commands: 501st Heavy SS Panzer Battalion
- Conflicts: World War II
- Awards: Knight's Cross of the Iron Cross

Heinrich Heinz Kling (10 September 1913 – 30 September 1951) was a German Waffen-SS commander during the Nazi era, who served with the Leibstandarte SS Adolf Hitler (LSSAH).

== Biography ==
Kling graduated from the SS-Junkerschule Bad Tölz in 1938. On November 14, 1939 he joined the 12th SS Totenkopf Standarte in Łódź, which shot a thousand residents of the psychiatric hospital in Owinsk near Poznań. He participated in so-called operations against "partisans", which meant the execution of Polish intellectuals and Jews. For his service he was awarded with the Iron Cross 2nd Class and the War Merit Cross with swords. Prior to Operation Barbarossa he was transferred to the Leibstandarte, and commanded its 13th (heavy) company of Tiger I tanks. As an ardent Nazi, Kling was popular among his fellow Waffen-SS soldiers.

From late November 1943, the SS Panzer Regiment 1 was commanded by Joachim Peiper, of whom Kling was a personal favorite. Peiper consequently made Kling leader of the 2nd Battalion, and nominated him for the Knight's Cross of the Iron Cross. Kling received the award on 23 February 1944.

Kling was heavily wounded during Operation Overlord. On 19 March 1945, he was appointed commander of the 501st Heavy SS Panzer Battalion.
