= Désirée Nick =

German television personality (born 1956)

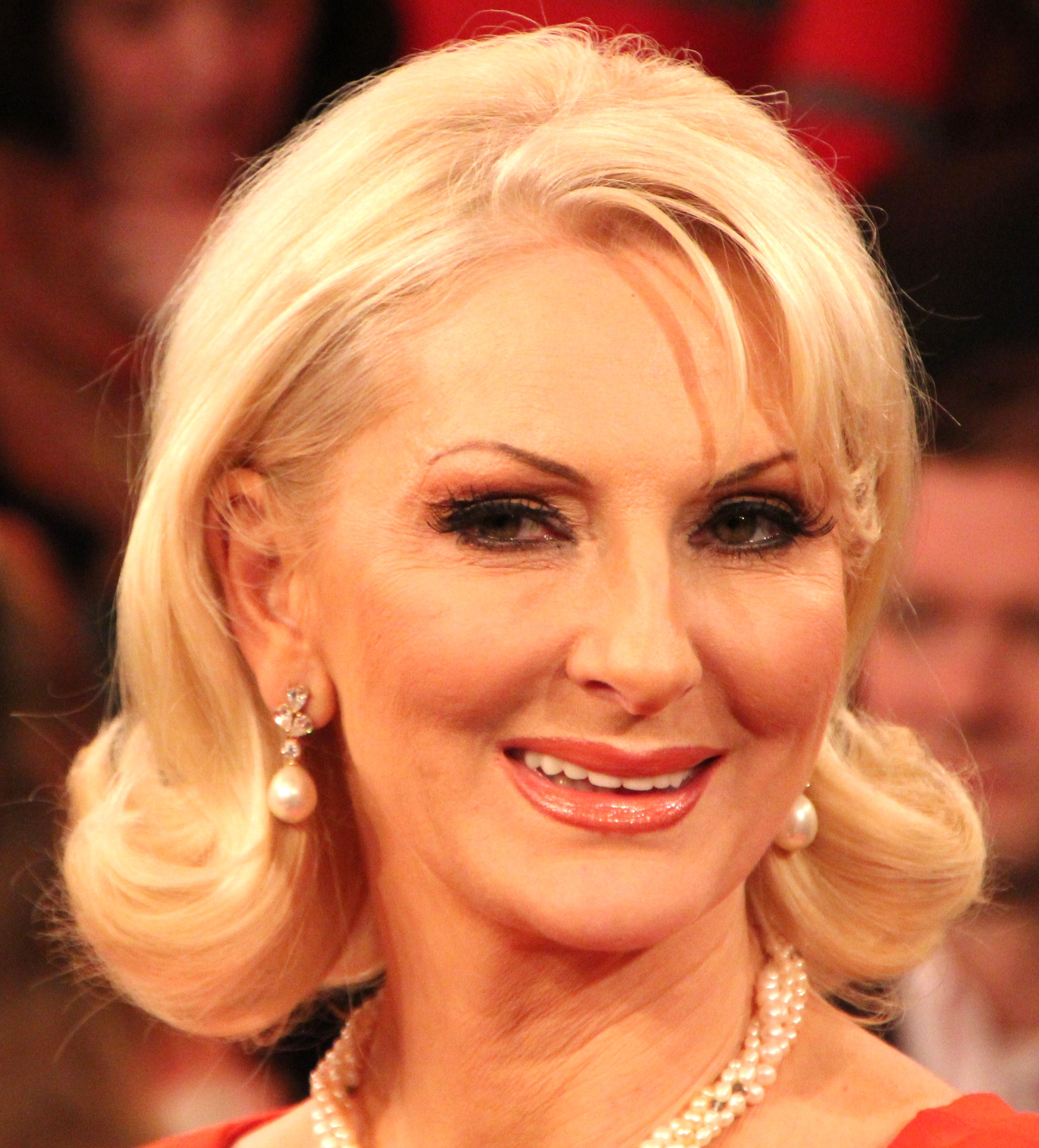
- Nick in 2011
- Born: Désirée Gerda Saskia Pamela Amneris Aida Nick; 30 September 1956 (age 70); West Berlin, West Germany
- Occupations: TV personality; actress; dancer; author
- Children: 1
- Website: www.desiree-nick.de

Désirée Gerda Saskia Pamela Amneris Aida Nick (born 30 September 1956) is a German reality television personality, actress, dancer, and author.

== Biography ==
Born in Berlin, Nick studied ballet at the Berliner Tanzakademie. She became a member of the ensemble of Deutsche Oper Berlin and later of Bavarian State Opera in Munich. Between 1982 and 1985 she lived in Munich and studied Roman Catholic theology. She then worked as a teacher for a few years.

In the 1990s, Nick worked as an actress. Her first film role was in Neurosia (1995) by Rosa von Praunheim. In 2000 she wrote her autobiography, Bestseller einer Diva – Seit Jahren vergriffen (Bestseller of a Diva – Out of Print for Years). In 2004, Nick had a legal dispute with actress Anouschka Renzi. That same year, Nick became popular in Germany, by winning the TV show Ich bin ein Star – Holt mich hier raus!, the German version of I'm a Celebrity...Get Me Out of Here!.

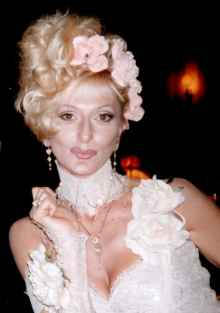
Nick in 1999

Since 2005, Nick has written several books. One of them, Eva go home, served as a response to the controversial claims about her motherhood and family and was published by former TV presenter Eva Herman.

Nick was in a relationship with Prince Heinrich Julius von Hannover for seventeen years, and they have one son together, Oscar Nick (29 September 1996 in Berlin). In 2017, their son became a British citizen while also taking on his father's title and last name as Oscar Julius Heinrich Ferdinand Prinz von Hannover.

In the 2020 film Enfant Terrible about the life of filmmaker Rainer Werner Fassbinder, directed by Oskar Roehler, Nick plays the role of Barbara Valentin.

In 2023 she made her English-language TV debut in Channel 4's reality TV show Fred's Last Resort. In the same year, Nick appeared on the cover of Playboy, thus making her the oldest German model to appear on the erotic magazine's cover at 66 years of age.

In 2025 she became increasingly active as an actress, appearing in three popular German TV series, SOKO Potsdam, In aller Freundschaft - Die jungen Ärzte, and a recurring role in Dahoam is Dahoam, as well as the made-for-TV film Keine Scheidung ohne Leiche.

To mark her 70th birthday, she created her new show “Reflection,” which will run in German and English at Berlin’s Wintergarten Varieté in September and October 2026.

== Works ==
- 1997: Bestseller einer Diva: Seit Jahren vergriffen. Droemer Knaur, Munich 1997. ISBN 3-426-60665-8 (together with Volker Ludewig)
- 2005: Gibt es ein Leben nach vierzig? Eine Anleitung zum Entfalten in Theorie und Praxis. Gustav Lübbe Verlag, Bergisch Gladbach 2005. ISBN 3-7857-2204-4
- 2006: Was unsere Mütter uns verschwiegen haben. Der Heimtrainer für Frauen in Nöten. Krüger, Frankfurt a.M. 2006. ISBN 3-8105-1325-3
- 2007: Eva go home! Eine Streitschrift. S. Fischer, Frankfurt a.M. 2007. ISBN 978-3-596-17669-4
- 2008: Liebling, ich komm später: Das große Buch vom Seitensprung. Krüger, Frankfurt a.M. 2008. ISBN 978-3-8105-1326-7
- 2011: Gibt es ein Leben nach fünfzig? Mein Beitrag zum Klimawandel. Marion von Schröder, ISBN 978-3547711769.
- 2012: Fürstliche Leibspeisen. Gerichte mit Geschichte. Lingen Verlag, ISBN 978-3941118928.
- 2014: Neues von der Arschterrasse. Marion von Schröder, ISBN 978-3547711981.
- 2016: Säger und Rammler und andere Begegnungen mit der Männerwelt. Heyne Verlag, ISBN 978-3453201057.
- 2018: Nein ist das neue Ja. Eden Books, ISBN 978-3959101837.
- 2020: Der Lack bleibt dran! Gräfe und Unzer, ISBN 978-3-8338-7284-6.
- 2021: Verboten gut! Schokolade. Knaur Verlag, ISBN 978-3-426-79138-7.
- 2023: Alte weiße Frau Penguin Random House, ISBN 978-3-328-11039-2.
- 2024: Bockwurst & Champagner - Zu Gast bei Désirée Nick Edition Lempertz, ISBN 978-3-96058-499-5.
- 2025: Nice to meet you, Berlin! Gräfe und Unzer, ISBN 978-3-8464-1027-1.
