= Wolfgang Thomale =

German general

- Born: 25 February 1900
- Died: 20 October 1978 (aged 78)
- Military career
- Allegiance: Nazi Germany
- Branch: Army (Wehrmacht)
- Service years: 1918–1945
- Rank: Generalleutnant
- Conflicts: World War I World War II: Operation Barbarossa; Battle of Białystok–Minsk; Battle of Smolensk (1941); Battle of Moscow
- Awards: Knight's Cross of the Iron Cross

Wolfgang Thomale (25 February 1900 – 20 October 1978) was a German general during World War II. He was a recipient of the Knight's Cross of the Iron Cross of Nazi Germany. He was a prisoner of war at Camp Ritchie in Maryland and was involved with the Hill Project, an effort to use German POWs to translate texts to better understand Military efforts of the Nazi regime following the end of the War.

== Awards and decorations ==
- Knight's Cross of the Iron Cross on 10 February 1942 as Oberstleutnant and commander of Panzer-Regiment 27

== Bibliography ==
- Fellgiebel, Walther-Peer (2000) [1986]. Die Träger des Ritterkreuzes des Eisernen Kreuzes 1939–1945 — Die Inhaber der höchsten Auszeichnung des Zweiten Weltkrieges aller Wehrmachtteile [The Bearers of the Knight's Cross of the Iron Cross 1939–1945 — The Owners of the Highest Award of the Second World War of all Wehrmacht Branches] (in German). Friedberg, Germany: Podzun-Pallas. ISBN 978-3-7909-0284-6.
