= Tiger II =

German WWII heavy tank

Panzerkampfwagen Tiger Ausf. B
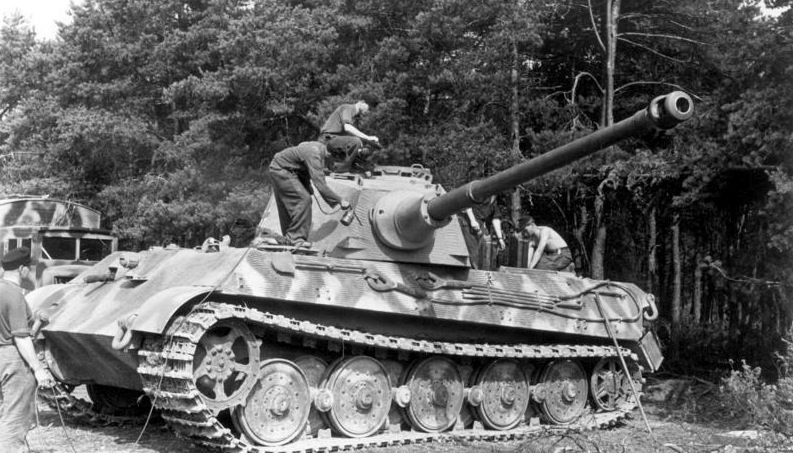
- Tiger II, France, June 1944
- Type: Heavy tank
- Place of origin: Nazi Germany

Service history
- In service: 1944–1945
- Wars: World War II

Production history
- Designer: Henschel & Son (hull); Krupp (turret)
- Designed: 1943
- Manufacturer: Henschel & Son; Krupp (turret)
- Unit cost: 321,500 ℛ︁ℳ︁ ($160,755 USD) in 1944–45
- Produced: 1944–45
- No. built: 492

Specifications
- Mass: 68.5 tonnes (67.4 long tons; 75.5 short tons) early turret; 69.8 tonnes (68.7 long tons; 76.9 short tons) production turret
- Length: 7.38 m (24 ft 3 in) hull; 10.29 m (33 ft 9 in) with gun forward)
- Width: 3.75 m (12 ft 4 in)
- Height: 3.09 m (10 ft 2 in)
- Crew: 5 (commander, gunner, loader, radio operator, driver)
- Armour: 25–185 mm (0.98–7.28 in)
- Main armament: 1× 8.8 cm KwK 43; Early Krupp design turret: 80 rounds; Production turret: 86 rounds
- Secondary armament: 2× 7.92 mm MG 34 machine guns; 5,850 rounds
- Engine: V-12 Maybach HL 230 P30 petrol engine 700 PS (510 kW; 690 hp)
- Power/weight: 10 PS (7.4 kW; 9.9 hp)/tonne
- Transmission: Maybach OLVAR OG 40 12 16 B (8 forward and 4 reverse)
- Suspension: Torsion bar
- Ground clearance: 495–510 mm (19.5–20.1 in)
- Fuel capacity: 860 litres (190 imp gal)
- Operational range: Road: 190 km (120 mi); Cross country: 120 km (75 mi)
- Maximum speed: Maximum, road: 41.5 km/h (25.8 mph); Sustained, road: 38 km/h (24 mph); Cross country: 15–20 km/h (9.3–12.4 mph)

The Tiger II was a German heavy tank of the Second World War. The final official German designation was Panzerkampfwagen Tiger Ausf. B, (Note: Panzerkampfwagen – abbr: Pz. or Pz.Kfw. (English: "armoured fighting vehicle"), Ausf. is abbreviation of Ausführung (English: variant). The full titles Panzerkampfwagen Tiger Ausf. B and Panzerbefehlswagen Tiger Ausf. B (for the command version) were used in training and maintenance manuals and in organisation and equipment tables.. Also sometimes referred to as "Pz. VI Ausf B", not to be confused with "Pz. VI Ausf E", which was the Tiger I.) often shortened to Tiger B. The ordnance inventory designation was Sd.Kfz. 182 (Sd.Kfz. 267 and 268 for command vehicles). It was also known informally as the Königstiger (Bengal tiger, lit. 'King Tiger') Allied soldiers often called it the King Tiger or Royal Tiger.

The Tiger II was the successor to the Tiger I, combining the latter's thick armour with the armour sloping used on the Panther medium tank. It was the costliest German tank to produce at the time. The tank weighed almost 70 tonnes (77 tons) and was protected by 100–185 mm (3.9–7.3 in) of armour to the front. It was armed with the long barrelled (71 calibre) 8.8 cm KwK 43 anti-tank cannon. (Note: KwK is abbreviation of Kampfwagenkanone – (literally 'fighting vehicle cannon')) The chassis was also the basis for the Jagdtiger turretless Jagdpanzer anti-tank vehicle.

The Tiger II was issued to heavy tank battalions of the Army and the Waffen-SS. It was first used in combat by 503rd Heavy Panzer Battalion during the Allied invasion of Normandy on 11 July 1944; on the Eastern Front, the first unit to be outfitted with the Tiger II was the 501st Heavy Panzer Battalion. Due to heavy Allied bombing, only 492 were produced.

== Development ==
Development started in 1937 with a design contract awarded to Henschel. Another design contract followed in 1939, given to Porsche. Both prototypes used the same turret design from Krupp. The main differences were in the hull, transmission, suspension and automotive features.

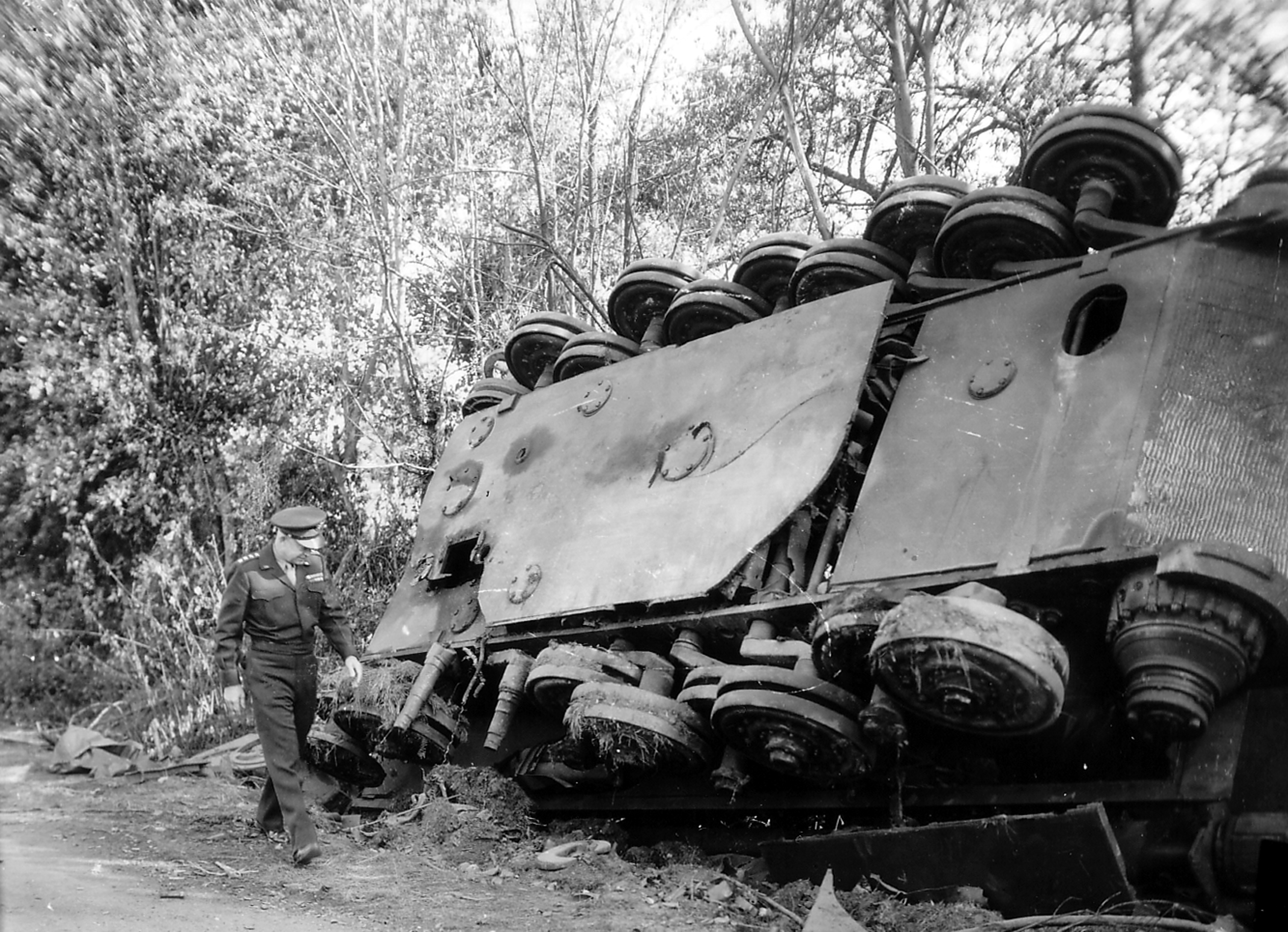
Supreme commander of the allied forces in Europe General Eisenhower walks by an overturned Tiger II destroyed in the Falaise pocket August 1944

The Henschel version used a conventional hull design with sloped armour resembling the layout of the Panther tank. It had a rear-mounted engine and used nine steel-tired, 80 cm-diameter (31 in) overlapping road wheels per side with internal springing, mounted on transverse torsion bars, in a similar manner to the original Henschel-designed Tiger I. To simplify maintenance, however, the wheels were only overlapping without being interleaved—the full Schachtellaufwerk rubber-rimmed road-wheel system that had been in use on nearly all German half-tracks used the interleaved design, later inherited by the Tiger I and Panther.

The Porsche hull designs included a rear-mounted turret and a mid-mounted engine. The suspension was the same as on the Elefant tank destroyer. This had six road wheels per side mounted in paired bogies sprung with short longitudinal torsion bars that were integral to the wheel pair; this saved internal space and facilitated repairs. One Porsche version had a gasoline-electric drive (fundamentally identical to a diesel-electric transmission, only using a gasoline-fueled engine as the prime mover), similar to a gasoline-electric hybrid but without a storage battery; two separate drivetrains in parallel, one per side of the tank, each consisting of a hybrid drive train; gasoline engine–electric generator–electric motor–drive sprocket. This method of propulsion had been used on the rejected Tiger (P) design, which had been rebuilt as Elefant, and in some US designs and was put into production in the French World War I era Saint-Chamond tank and post-World War I Char 2C. The Porsche suspension components were later used on a few of the later Jagdtiger tank destroyers. Another proposal was to use hydraulic drives; Dr Porsche's unorthodox designs gathered little favour.

== Design ==
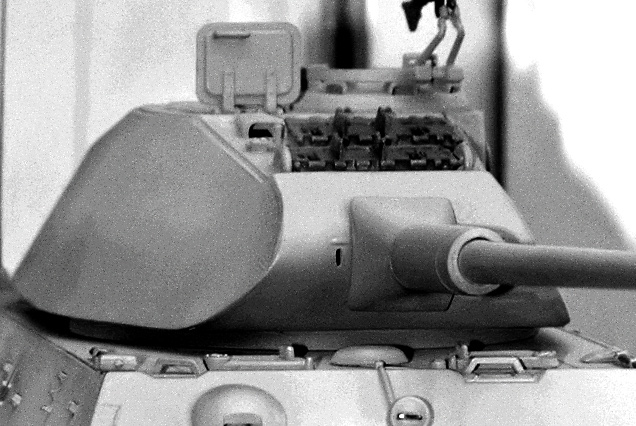
A model depicting the curved front of the first version of the Krupp turret (erroneously called "Porsche turret")

Henschel won the design contract, and all Tiger IIs were produced by the firm. Two turret designs were used in production vehicles. The initial design is often misleadingly called the "Porsche" turret due to the misbelief that it was designed by Porsche for their Tiger II prototype; in fact it was the initial Krupp design for both prototypes. This turret had a rounded front and steeply sloped sides, with a difficult-to-manufacture curved bulge on the turret's left side to accommodate the commander's cupola. Fifty early turrets were mounted to Henschel hulls and used in action. In December 1943 the more common "production" turret, sometimes erroneously called the "Henschel" turret, was simplified with a significantly thicker flat face (which eliminated the shot trap caused by the curved face of the earlier turret), and less-steeply sloped sides, which avoided the need for a bulge for the commander's cupola, and added additional room for ammunition storage.

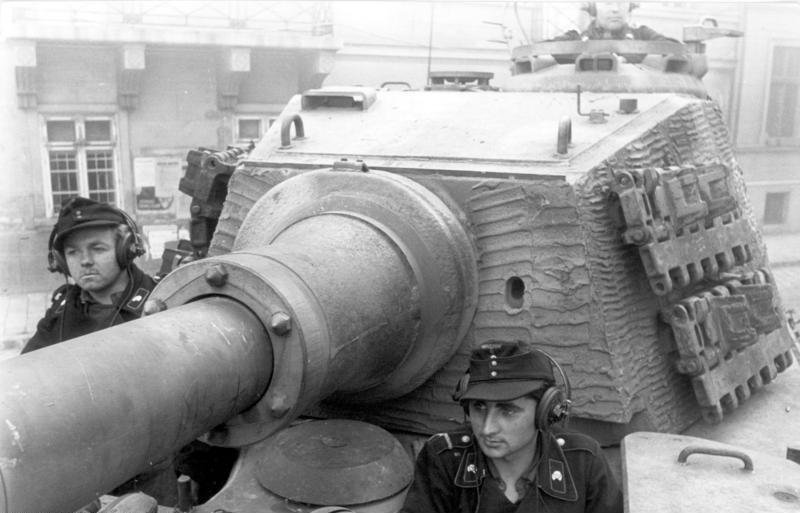
The vertical front of the "production turret" designed by Krupp (erroneously called "Henschel turret") taken during Operation Panzerfaust in Budapest, 15 October 1944. The rough Zimmerit coating is evident, used to prevent magnetic mines from adhering to the tank's armour.

The turrets were designed to mount the 8.8 cm (3.5 in) KwK 43 L/71 gun. Combined with the Turmzielfernrohr 9d (lit. 'turret telescopic sight') monocular sight by Leitz, which all but a few early Tiger IIs used, it was a very accurate and deadly weapon. During practice, the estimated probability of a first-round hit on a 2 m (6 ft 7 in) high, 2.5 m (8 ft 2 in) wide target was 100 percent at 1,000 m (1,100 yd), 95–97 percent at 1,500 m (1,600 yd) and 85–87 percent at 2,000 m (2,200 yd), depending on ammunition type. Recorded combat performance was lower, but still over 80 percent at 1,000 m, in the 60s at 1,500 m and the 40s at 2,000 m. Penetration of armoured plate inclined at 30 degrees was 202 and 132 mm (8.0 and 5.2 in) at 100 m (110 yd) and 2,000 m (2,200 yd) respectively for the Panzergranate 39/43 projectile (PzGr, lit. 'armour-piercing shell'), and 238 and 153 mm (9.4 and 6.0 in) for the PzGr. 40/43 projectile between the same ranges. The Sprenggranate 43 (SpGr) high-explosive round was available for soft targets, or the Hohlgranate or Hohlgeschoss 39 (HlGr, lit. 'High-explosive anti-tank warhead') round, which had 90 mm (3.5 in) penetration at any range, could be used as a dual-purpose munition against soft or armoured targets.

Powered turret traverse was provided by the variable speed Boehringer-Sturm L4S hydraulic motor, which was driven from the main engine by a secondary drive shaft. A high and a low speed setting was available to the gunner via a lever on his right. The turret could be rotated 360 degrees at 6°/s in low gear independent of engine rpm, at 19°/s – the same as with the Tiger I – with the high speed setting and engine at 2000 rpm, and over 36°/s at the maximum allowable engine speed of 3,000 rpm. The direction and speed of traverse was controlled by the gunner through foot pedals, whilst a high torque low speed (useful when on slopes) or low torque high speed final gearing could be selected via a control lever near his left arm. This system allowed for very precise control of powered traverse, a light touch on the pedal resulting in a minimum traverse speed of 0.1°/s (360°/h), unlike in most other tanks of the time (e.g. US M4 Sherman or Soviet T-34 medium tanks) this allowed for fine laying of the gun without the gunner needing to use his traverse handwheel. If power was lost, such as when the tank ran out of fuel, the turret could be slowly traversed by hand, assisted by the loader who had an additional wheel, which could manually rotate the turret at a rate of 0.5° per revolution of the hand crank; a 20° turret rotation required 40 full cranks of the handwheel, and to turn the turret a full 360° the gunner would be required to crank the handwheel 720 full revolutions.

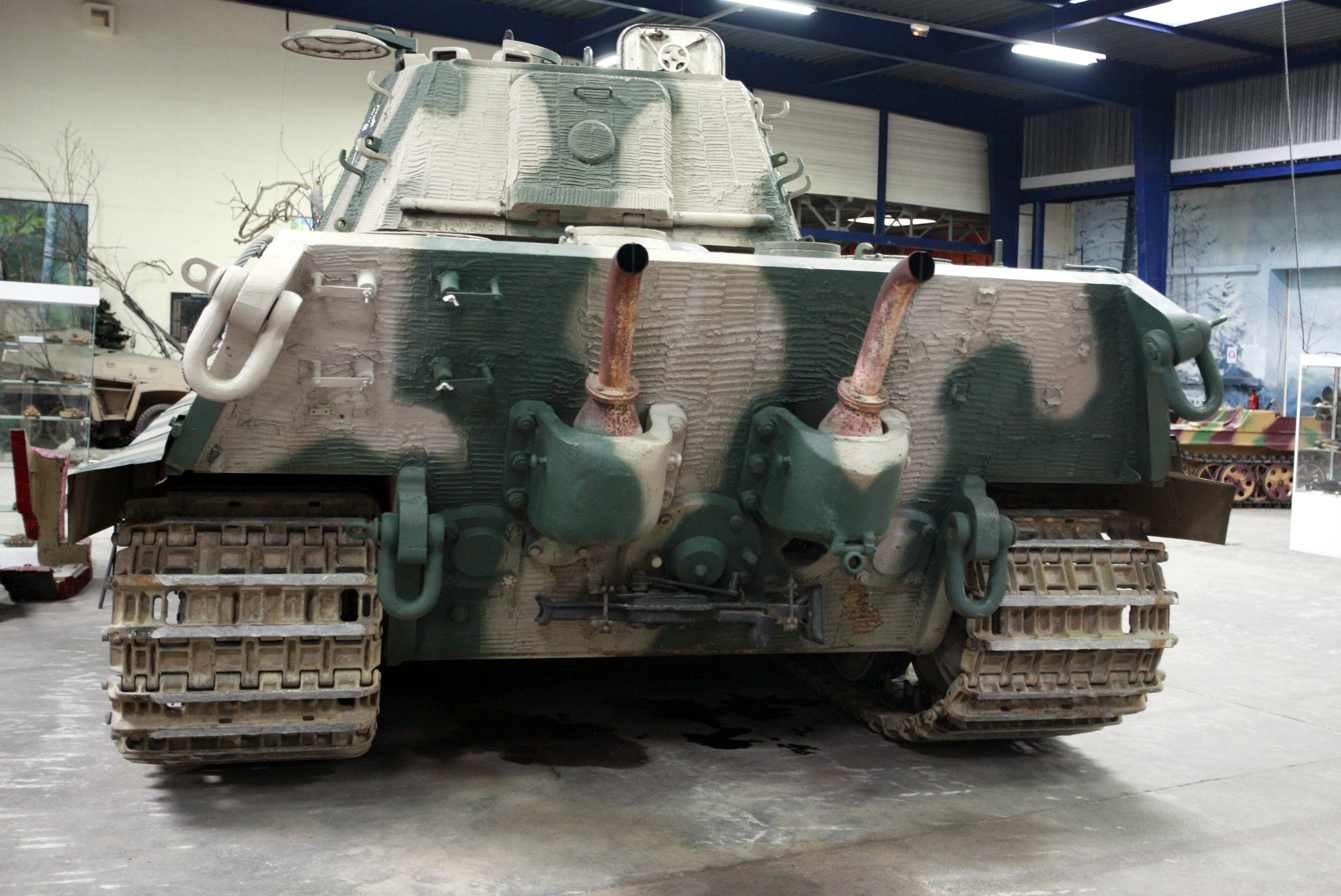
Rear view showing dual exhausts

Like all German tanks, the Tiger II had a petrol engine; in this case the same 700 PS (510 kW; 690 hp) V-12 Maybach HL 230 P30 which powered the much lighter Panther and Tiger I tanks. The Tiger II was under-powered, like many other heavy tanks of World War II, and consumed a lot of fuel, which was in short supply for the Germans. The transmission was the Maybach OLVAR OG 40 12 16 Model B, giving eight forward gears and four reverse, which drove the steering gear. This was the Henschel L 801, a double radius design which initially proved susceptible to failure. Transverse torsion bar suspension supported the hull on nine axles per side. Overlapped 800 mm (31 in) diameter road wheels with rubber cushions and steel tyres rode inside the tracks. Late production Tiger Is received the same wheels, which were one of the few interchangeable parts between the two tanks.

Like the Tiger I, each tank was issued with two sets of tracks: a normal "battle track" and a narrower "transport" version used during rail movement. The transport tracks reduced the overall width of the load and could be used to drive the tank short distances on firm ground. The crew were expected to change to normal battle tracks as soon as the tank was unloaded. Ground pressure was 0.76 kg/cm^{2} (10.8 psi)

=== Command variant ===
The command variant of the Tiger II was designated Panzerbefehlswagen Tiger Ausf. B. It had two versions, Sd.Kfz. 267 and Sd.Kfz. 268. These had reduced ammunition capacity (only 63 rounds of 8.8 cm ammunition) to provide room for the extra radios and equipment, and had additional armour on the engine compartment. The Sd.Kfz. 267 was to have used FuG 8 and FuG 5 radio sets, with the most notable external changes being a two-metre-long (6 ft 7 in) rod antenna mounted on the turret roof and a Sternantenne D ("Star antenna D"), mounted on an insulated base (the 105 mm (4.1 in) Antennenfuß Nr. 1), which was protected by a large armoured cylinder. This equipment was located on the rear decking in a position originally used for deep-wading equipment. The Sd.Kfz. 268 used FuG 7 and FuG 5 radios with a 2 m (6 ft 7 in) rod antenna mounted on the turret roof and a 1.4 m (4 ft 7 in) rod antenna mounted on the rear deck.

== Production ==
The Tiger II was developed late in the war and built in relatively small numbers. Orders were placed for 1,500 Tiger IIs—slightly more than the 1,347 Tiger I tanks produced—but production was heavily disrupted by Allied bombing raids. Among others, five raids between 22 September and 7 October 1944 destroyed 95 percent of the floor area of the Henschel plant. It is estimated that this caused the loss in production of 657 Tiger IIs. Only 492 units were produced: one in 1943, 379 in 1944, and 112 in 1945. Full production ran from mid-1944 to the end of the war. Each Tiger II cost 321,500 Reichsmark . The vehicle was the costliest German tank to produce at the time.

The Tiger II served as the basis for one production variant, the Jagdtiger casemated tank destroyer, and a proposed Grille 17/21/30/42 self-propelled mount for heavy guns which never reached production.

== Proposed upgrades ==
The Maybach HL234, an engine born from attempting to convert the Maybach HL230 to fuel injection, would have increased the power from 700 to at least 800 PS (590 kW; 790 hp). In January 1945 the Entwicklungskommission Panzer unanimously decided that HL234 be immediately included in the engine design and procurement program. The ZF AK-7-200 gearbox was also explored as an alternative to the Maybach Olvar-B semi-automatic gearbox, but Waffenamt research and development department Wa Prüf 6 found that it offered inferior driving characteristics and so the Maybach Olvar-B was retained. There was also a program using the Simmering-Graz-Pauker Sla.16-cylinder diesel engine, but the war's constraint on supplies and Germany's capitulation resulted in the cancellation of this program. Krupp proposed mounting a new main weapon, the 10.5 cm KwK L/68. Wa Prüf 6 did not support this as the Heer had not accepted the cannon. Other suggested improvements included stabilised sights, a stabilised main gun, an automatic ammunition feed, a Carl Zeiss AG stereoscopic rangefinder, heated crew compartment, stowage for an additional 12 rounds, and an overpressure and air filtration system to protect against poison gas. However, these also never got beyond the proposal stage or did not enter production before the war ended.

== Specifications ==
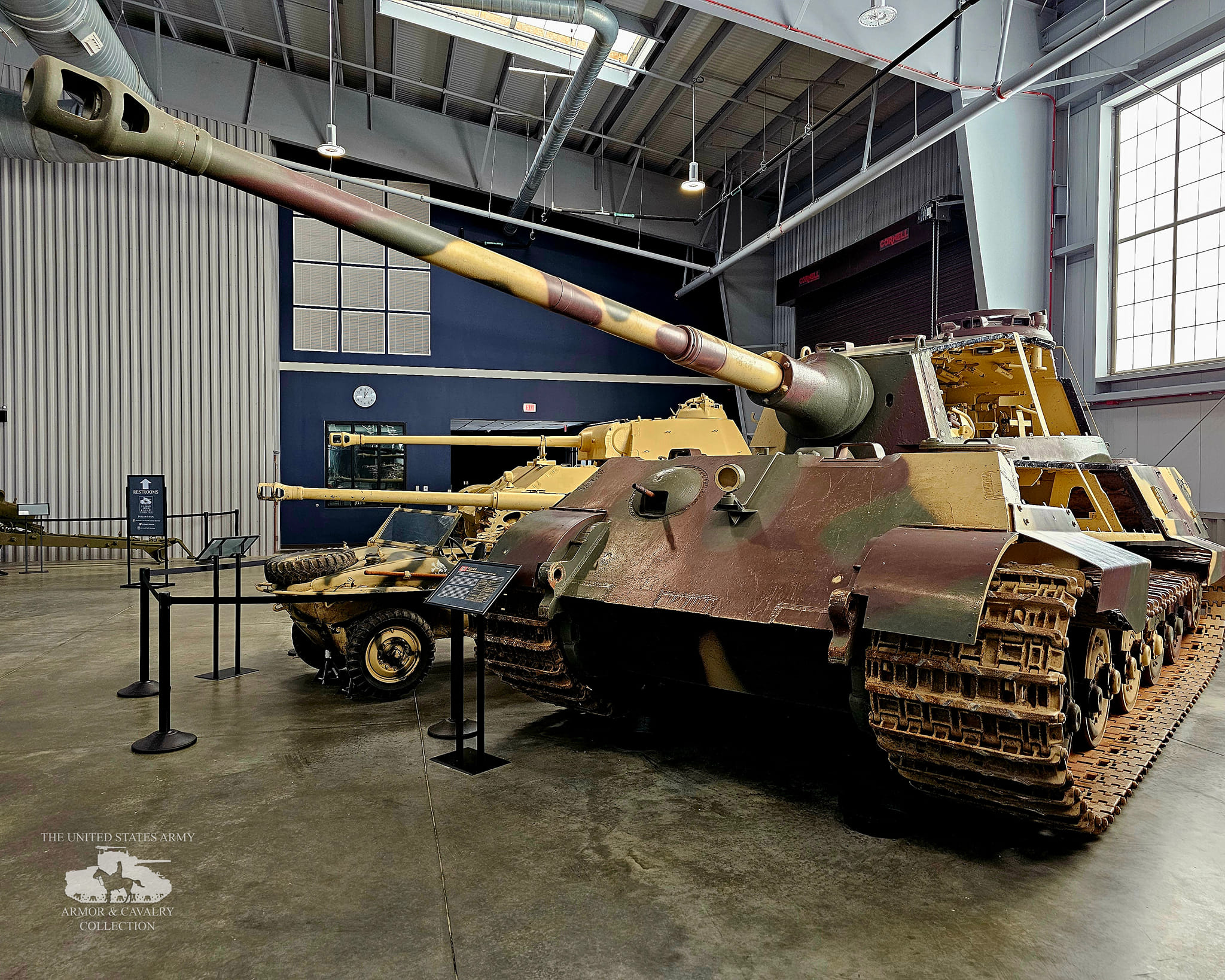
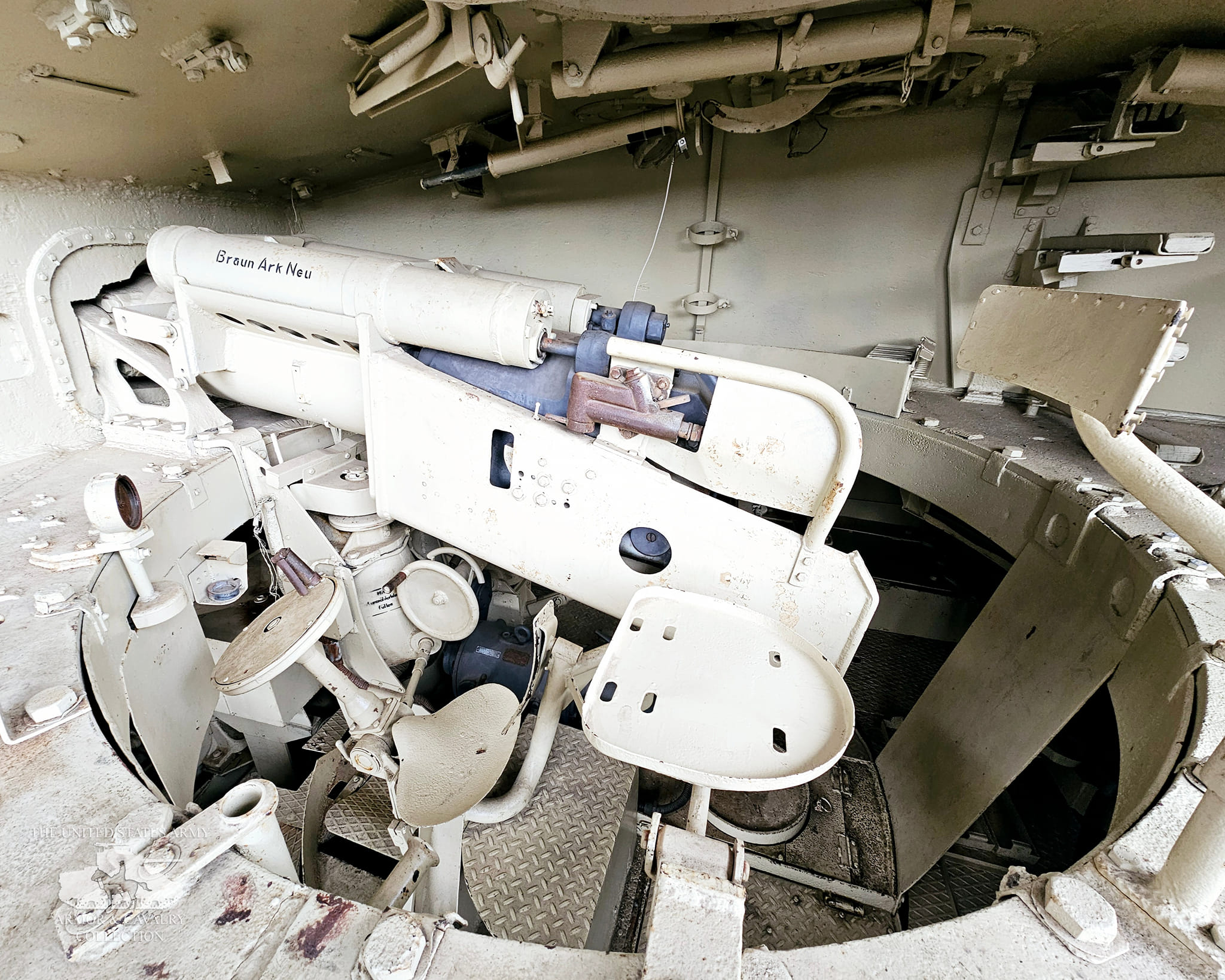
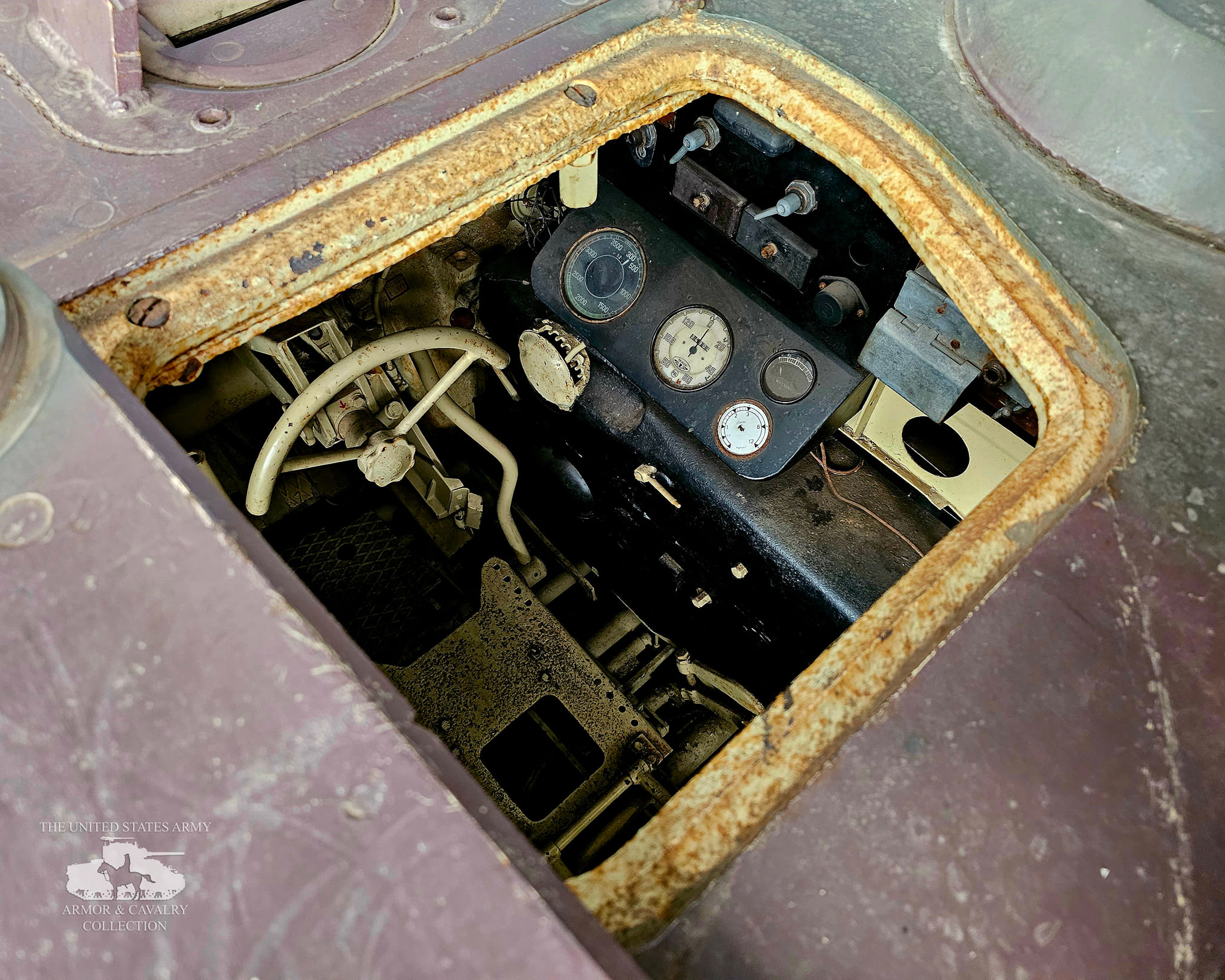
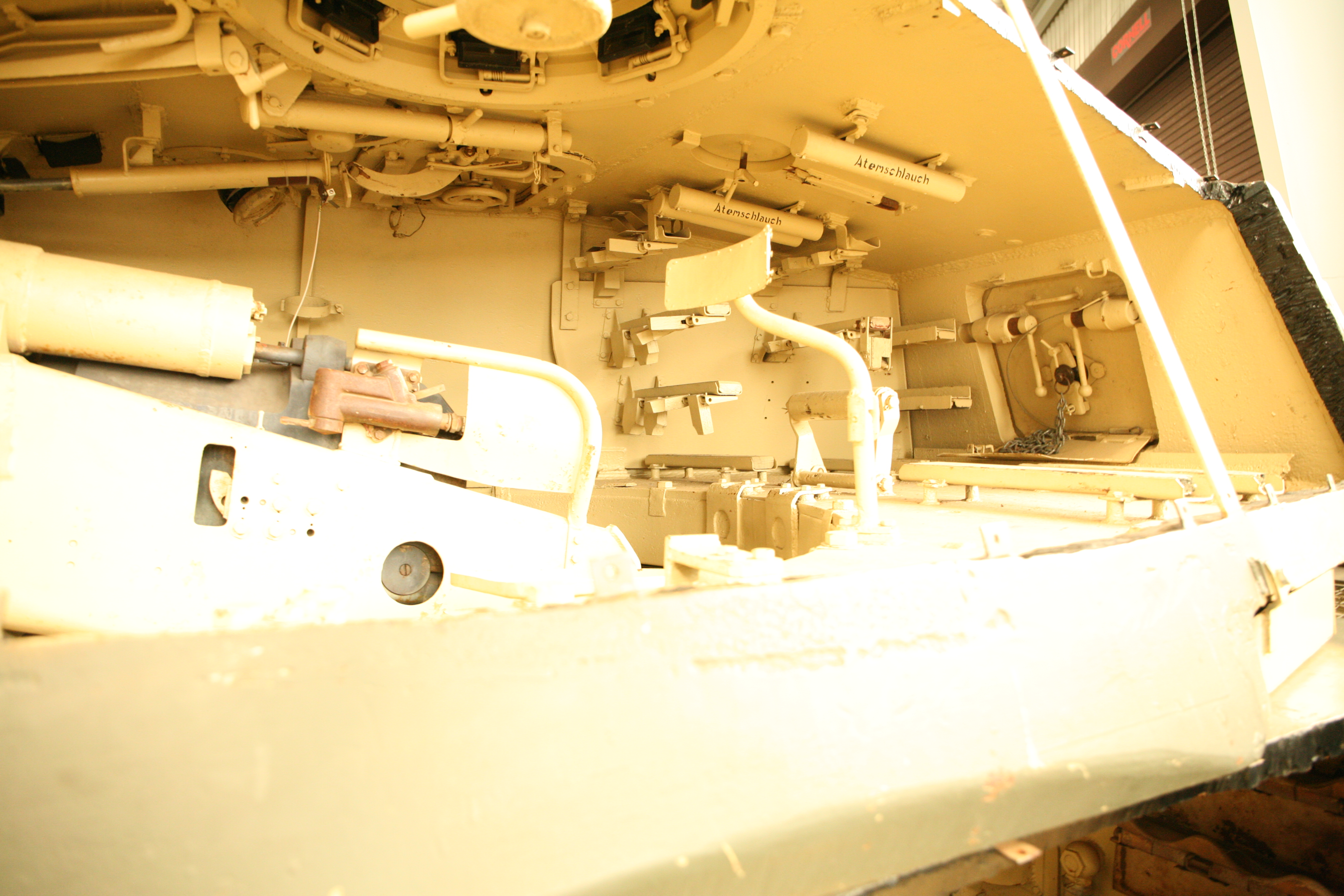
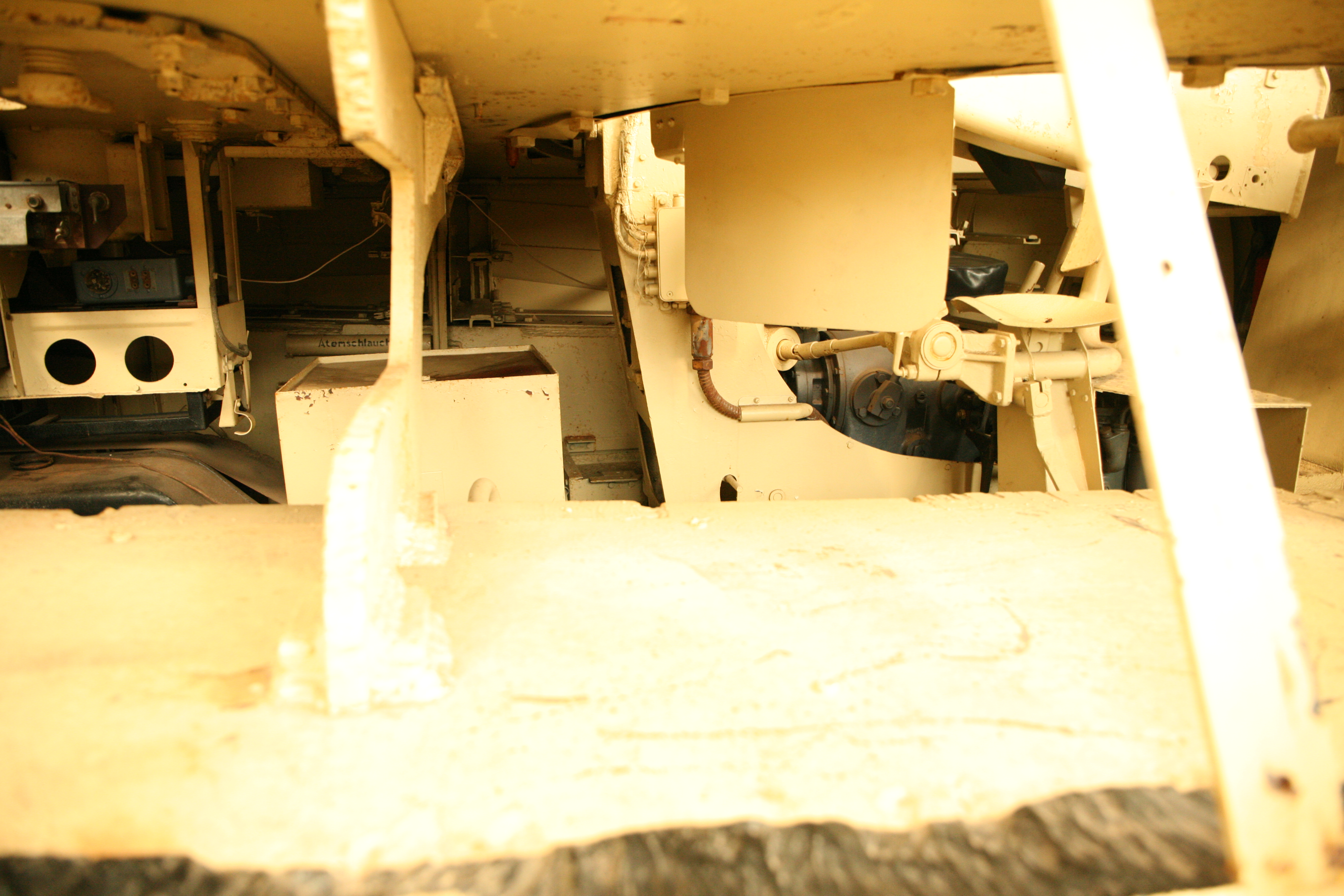
Tiger II 332 cutaway model at the U.S. Army Armor and Cavalry Collection

Gearbox
Maybach OLVAR OG 40 12 16 B (eight forward and four reverse)
Radio
FuG 5, Befehlswagen (lit. 'command tank') version: FuG 8 (Sd.Kfz. 267), FuG 7 (Sd.Kfz. 268)
Ammunition
8.8 cm – 80 rounds (early turret), 86 rounds (main production turret), usually 50% PzGr 39/43 and 50% SprGr 43, sometimes with a limited number of PzGr 40/43, or with the SprGr replaced by HlGr (Note: The rounds were: PzGr 39/43 Armour-piercing, hardened steel (APCBC)) giving longer range, lower penetration, explosive filler; PzGr 40/43 Armour-piercing, tungsten carbide core (APCR)) with shorter range, higher penetration, inert; SprGr 43 High explosive (HE)); HlGr 39 Hollow charge (HEAT)))
7.92mm – up to 5,850 rounds
Gun Sight
Turmzielfernrohr 9b/1 (TZF 9b/1) binocular to May 1944, then the 9d (TZF 9d) monocular.

Turret comparison
Feature	Early turret (Used on first 50 Tiger IIs)	Production turret (Used on subsequent Tiger IIs)
Front plate	Curved/rounded face (100 mm)	Flat face (180 mm)
Commander's cupola	Had a noticeable, difficult-to-manufacture curved bulge on the side of the turret to accommodate it.	The bulge was eliminated through a simplified turret casting and slightly less-sloped sides, improving protection.
Ammunition capacity	80 rounds	86 rounds

Armour layout (all angles from horizontal)
Location		Thickness		Aspect
Location		mm	in	°
Hull	Front (lower)	100	3.9	40
Hull	Front (upper)	150	5.9	40
Hull	Side (lower)	80	3.1	90
Hull	Side (upper)	80	3.1	65
Hull	Rear	80	3.1	60
Hull	Top	40	1.6	0
Hull	Bottom (front)	40	1.6	90
Hull	Bottom (rear)	25	0.98	90
Turret	Front (production)	180	7.1	80
Turret	Front ("Porsche")	60–100	2.4–3.9	rounded
Turret	Side (production)	80	3.1	69
Turret	Side ("Porsche")	80	3.1	60
Turret	Rear (production)	80	3.1	70
Turret	Rear ("Porsche")	80	3.1	60
Turret	Top (production)	44	1.7	0–10
Turret	Top ("Porsche")	40	1.6	0–12

== Operational history ==
=== Organisation ===
Apart from research, training, and a five-tank attachment to the Panzer Lehr, the Tiger II was only issued to heavy tank battalions (German: schwere Panzer-Abteilungen) of the German Army (Heer), or Waffen-SS.

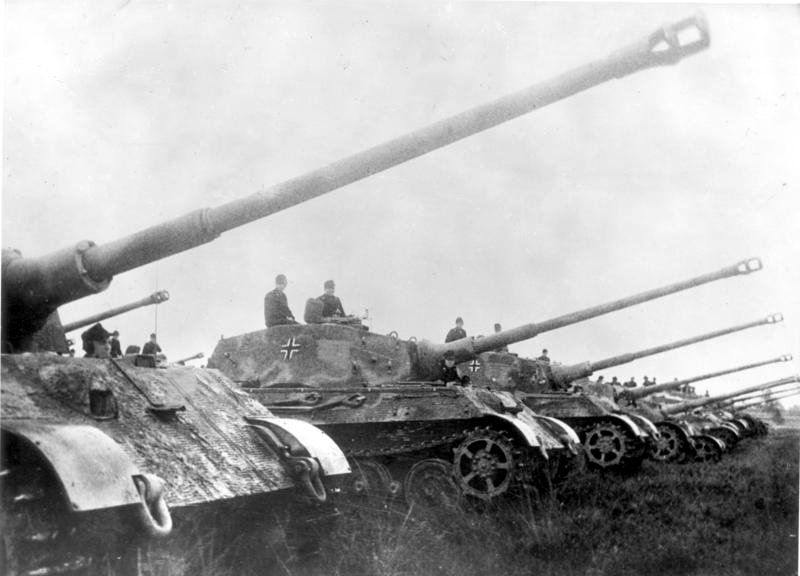
Tiger II tanks fitted with the narrower "vehicle-transport tracks" of the Schwere Heeres Panzer Abteilung 503 (s.H.Pz.Abt. 503) 'Feldherrnhalle' posing in formation for the Nazi German wartime-propaganda newsreel at the armour-training ground in Sennelager, Germany, prior to the unit's departure for Hungary

A standard battalion (Abteilung) comprised 45 tanks:

- Battalion command: 3 × Tiger II
  - 1st company command: 2 × Tiger II
    - 1st platoon: 4 × Tiger II
    - 2nd platoon: 4 × Tiger II
    - 3rd platoon: 4 × Tiger II
  - 2nd company command: 2 × Tiger II
    - 1st platoon: 4 × Tiger II
    - 2nd platoon: 4 × Tiger II
    - 3rd platoon: 4 × Tiger II
  - 3rd company command: 2 × Tiger II
    - 1st platoon: 4 × Tiger II
    - 2nd platoon: 4 × Tiger II
    - 3rd platoon: 4 × Tiger II

Units that used the Tiger II:

- Heer (s.H.Pz.Abt.):
  - 501
  - 502
  - 503
  - 504
  - 505
  - 506
  - 507
  - 508
  - 509
  - 510
  - 511
- SS (s.SS.Pz.Abt.):
  - 501
  - 502
  - 503

=== Reliability and mobility ===
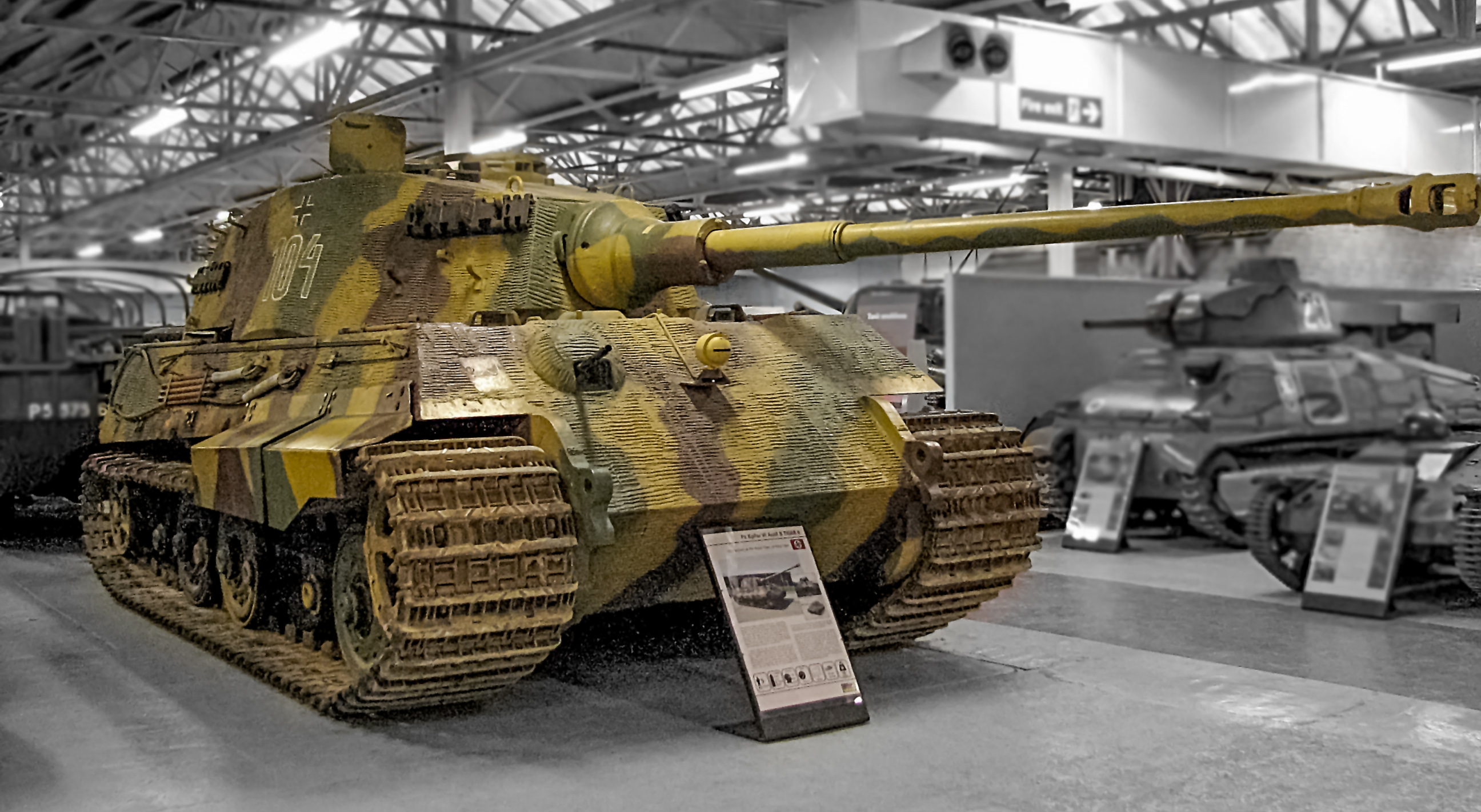
A camouflaged Tiger II on display at Bovington Tank museum. The long gun overhangs the bow by several metres.

Early Tiger IIs proved unreliable, owing principally to leaking seals and gaskets, an overburdened drive train originally intended for a lighter vehicle, manufacturing defects, and failures of the final drives, track tensioning adjusters, and sprocket wheels due to production simplifications in the tracks that led to manufacturing defects. The final drive unit and the double radius steering gear were initially particularly prone to failures.

The new double-link track design proved to be vulnerable to sideways stresses when the tank was driving on uneven terrain, as well as causing only every other sprocket tooth to engage with the track due to manufacturing defects, leading to rapid wear of the sprocket teeth and damage to final drives and track tensioning systems.

The inspector general of panzer troops, Wolfgang Thomale, stated in a briefing on 4 November 1944 regarding the Tiger II’s reliability problems:

The Führer has been informed of the complaints regarding the Tiger II, all of which stem from the new tracks. To simplify the manufacturing process, not every tooth of the drive sprocket engages with the track, as was previously the case, but only every second tooth. This has resulted in severe jerks in the final drives that reduce the driving force to the drive sprockets, which cannot withstand these blows.

At several occasions in early 1945, Thomale took a stance against the, in his eyes, exaggerated production simplifications that were carried out at any cost. According to him, prime examples were the Panther final drives and Tiger II tracks, which led to increased losses and expenditure in material and man-power to fix the problems created by the initial simplification.

Tiger II 332 arrives at the U.S. Army Armor and Cavalry Collection, Fort Benning, Georgia

Henschel's chief designer, Erwin Aders, wrote, "The failures occurred because the Tiger II went into production without considering the test results." Lack of crew training could amplify this problem; drivers originally given only limited training on other tanks were often sent directly to operational units already on their way to the front.

The 501st Heavy Tank Battalion arrived on the Eastern Front with only eight out of 45 tanks operational; these faults were mostly due to final drive failures. The first five Tiger IIs delivered to the Panzer Lehr Division broke down before they could be used in combat, and were destroyed to prevent capture.

The 506th Heavy Tank Battalion had been equipped with 45 Tiger IIs between late August and mid-September and made the following report on 30 September 1944 about its initial experiences with the Tiger II:

Experiences with the Panzerkampfwagen "Tiger" B:

The battalion has been fully equipped with Panzerkampfwagen VI B tanks since September 15, 1944. The troops are satisfied with the new vehicle. The breakdowns that have occurred so far are “teething problems,” and once these are resolved, the Tiger B will be the heavy tank.

After 50-100 km of travel, the following breakdowns have occurred:

- 12 final drives.
- 10 track tensioning systems: a) Steering fork breakage, b) Shaft breakage, c) sheared threaded shaft
- 4 sprocket teeth, sheared teeth (50% of all sprocket teeth showed severe tooth wear).
- 1 intermediate shaft to the side transmission: grooves deformed, requiring the shaft to be cut (80mm) for disassembly. Disassembly of the side transmissions also revealed varying degrees of groove deformation.
- 6 gearboxes with shift delay.
- 1 steering box.
- 1 engine, water in the cylinder.
- 1 broken torsion bar.
- 1 fuel tank, leaking due to torn spot welds on the intermediate walls, leading to fuel loss. Probably the cause of two fires at the training range.

Henschel worked closely with crews to solve the problems, and with the introduction of modified seals, gaskets, drive train components, a new track and sprocket wheel design, as well as improved driver training and sufficient maintenance, the Tiger II could be maintained in a satisfactory operational condition. Statistics from 15 March 1945 show reliability rates of 59 percent for the Tiger, almost equal to the 62 percent of the Panzer IV and better than the 48 percent of the Panther that were operational by this period.

The 503rd Heavy Panzer Battalion wrote in an after-action report, dated 22 November 1944, the following about its experiences with using the Tiger II during operations in Hungary since 9 October, concluding that it had "proven itself in every way":

...The battalion went into action in two battle groups with two different divisions on two different days. Provided the assault was successful in penetrating into the enemy rear, the battalion would then reunite. Both groups were extraordinarily successful. From 19–23 October 1944, 120 anti-tank guns and 19 guns were destroyed. The extremely tough and steadfast enemy (penal battalions) was shaken to the core by the energetic assault and his communications to the rear thrown into total confusion by the destruction of various columns and a transport train which, in the final analysis, forced the Russian Sixth Army from the Debrecen area. The total distance of about 250 kilometers covered during the operation was accomplished essentially without mechanical failure. The Tiger II proved itself extremely well, both in its armor and from a mechanical perspective. Vehicles which received up to twenty hits without becoming disabled were not uncommon ... The employment of American 9.2cm and conical antitank guns (7.5 down to 5.7cm) has, fortunately, only led to two total losses so far. Those weapons even penetrate the gun mantlet at ranges under 600 meters. Hits that penetrate the back of the turret cause explosion of the ammunition stored there and generally have resulted in total losses of the vehicles. In armor versus armor engagements, the 8.8 KwK 43 has proven effective in destroying all types of enemy armor, including the Stalin tank at ranges up to 1500 meters. T-34 and T-43 tanks could be knocked out in favorable firing conditions at ranges up to 3,000 meters. Frequently, as in the West, the Russian tanks avoided combating Tigers or turned away after the first tank was knocked out. The same holds true for assault guns as for the Stalin tanks. Assault guns have not yet been knocked out at ranges greater than 1,500 meters. In summary, the Tiger II has proven itself in every way and is a weapon that the enemy fears. When the formation is used as a single, unified entity and is employed in accordance with proper tactics, it always brings decisive success...

Notwithstanding its initial reliability problems, the Tiger II was remarkably agile for such a heavy vehicle. Contemporary German records and testing results indicate that its tactical mobility was as good as or better than most German or Allied tanks. (Note: The authors paid a visit to the Tiger II (Fgst.Nr. 280273, produced in October 1944) now located in the Ardenness in the village of La Gleize. Driving a modern car to the village on the narrow, steep and sharply curved roads, had required frequent use of low gears. That Tiger IIs had managed to make this same trip in the winter was indeed an impressive testimony to both their maneuverability and mobility.)

Lt Col H.A. Shields of the American Army's 66th Armored Regiment reported in 1945:

Wherever we have seen Tiger or Panther tanks, they have not demonstrated any inferior maneuverability. Near Pottendorf, several Royal Tiger tanks were encountered. These Royal Tigers were able to negotiate very soft ground and their tracks did not sink in soft ground as did our own.

=== Combat history ===
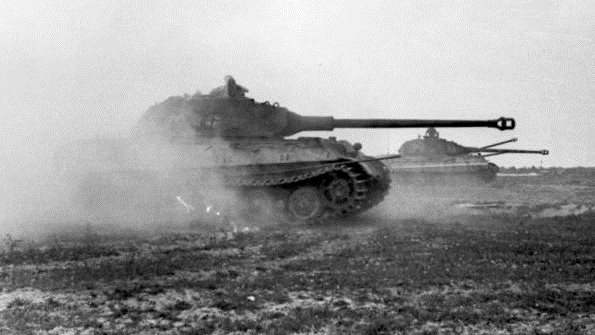
Tiger IIs (with the first version of the Krupp turret) on the move in France, June 1944

The first combat use of the Tiger II was by the 1st Company of the 503rd Heavy Panzer Battalion (s.H.Pz.Abt. 503) during the Battle of Normandy, opposing the Canadian offensive Operation Atlantic between Troarn and Demouville on 18 July 1944. Two were lost in combat, while the company commander's tank became irrecoverably trapped after falling into a bomb crater created during Operation Goodwood.

On the Eastern Front, it was first used on 12 August 1944 by the 501st Heavy Panzer Battalion (s.H.Pz.Abt. 501) resisting the Lvov–Sandomierz Offensive. It attacked the Soviet bridgehead over the Vistula River near Baranów Sandomierski. On the road to Oględów, three Tiger IIs were destroyed in an ambush by a few T-34-85s. Because these German tanks suffered ammunition explosions, which caused many crew fatalities, main gun rounds were no longer allowed to be stowed within the turret, reducing capacity to 68. Up to fourteen Tiger IIs of the 501st were destroyed or captured in the area between 11 and 14 August to ambushes and flank attacks by both Soviet T-34-85 and IS-2 tanks, and ISU-122 assault guns in inconvenient sandy terrain. The capture of three operational Tiger IIs allowed the Soviets to conduct tests at Kubinka and to evaluate its strengths and weaknesses

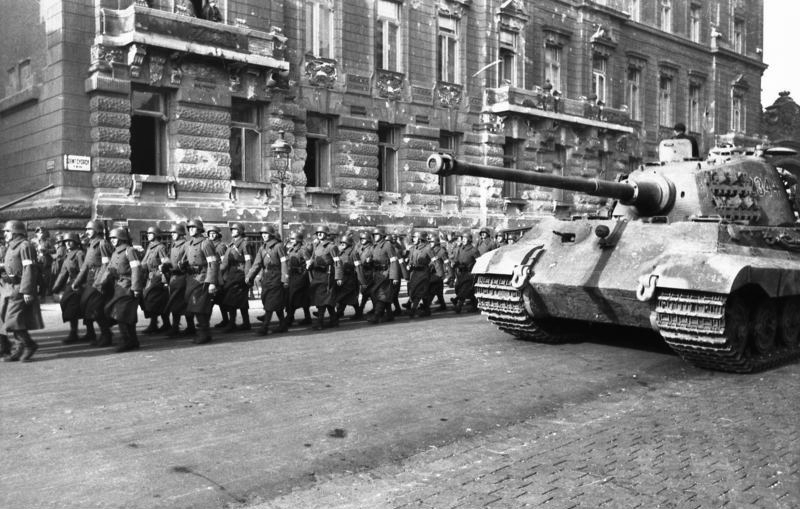
A Tiger II of s.H.Pz.Abt. 503 and Arrow Cross militia units in a battle-scarred street in Buda's Castle district, October 1944

On 15 October 1944, Tiger IIs of 503rd Heavy Panzer Battalion played a crucial role during Operation Panzerfaust, supporting Otto Skorzeny's troops in taking the Hungarian capital of Budapest, which ensured that the country remained with the Axis until the end of the war. The 503rd then took part in the Battle of Debrecen. The 503rd remained in the Hungarian theater of operations for 166 days, during which time it accounted for at least 121 Soviet tanks, 244 anti-tank guns and artillery pieces, five aircraft and a train. This was set against the loss of 25 Tiger IIs; ten were knocked out by Soviet troops and burned out, two were sent back to Vienna for a factory overhaul, while thirteen were blown up by their crews for various reasons, usually to prevent them from falling into enemy hands.

The Tiger II was also used in significant numbers, distributed into four heavy panzer battalions, during the Ardennes Offensive (also known as the 'Battle of the Bulge') of December 1944. At least 150 Tiger IIs were present, nearly a third of total production; most were lost over the course of the offensive.

Some Tiger IIs were also present during the Soviet Vistula–Oder and East Prussian Offensives in January 1945, as well as the German Lake Balaton Offensive in Hungary in March 1945, the Battle of the Seelow Heights in April 1945, and the Battle of Berlin at the end of the war.

The 103rd SS Heavy Panzer Battalion (s.SS Pz.Abt. 503) claimed approximately 500 kills in the period from January to April 1945 on the Eastern Front for the loss of 45 Tiger IIs (most of which were abandoned and destroyed by their own crews after mechanical breakdowns or for lack of fuel).

=== Gun and armour performance ===
A Tiger II with several failed penetrations in its front armour and a penetration in its turret.

The heavy armour and powerful long-range gun gave the Tiger II an advantage against all opposing Western Allied and Soviet tanks attempting to engage it from head on. This was especially true on the Western Front where, until the arrival of the few M26 Pershings in 1945 and the few M4A3E2 Sherman "Jumbo" assault tanks with additional armour (Note: and after February 1945 some with high velocity 76 mm gun) that were scattered around Europe after D-Day, as well as a few late Churchill models, (Note: The Churchill Mark VII weighed 40 tons and had 152 mm of armour on hull and turret front but carried the same 75 mm gun as most Allied tanks in Western Europe) neither the British nor US forces brought heavy tanks into service. A Wa Prüf 1 report estimated that the Tiger II's frontal aspect was impervious to the Soviet 122 mm D-25T, one of the largest calibre tank guns of the war. Soviet testing found that the frontal glacis could be destroyed only by firing 3–4 shots at the weld joints from the ranges of 500–600m. Weld joints were found to be inferior quality to the Tiger I and Panther. An R.A.C 3.d. document of February 1945 estimated that the British (76.2 mm) QF 17-pounder gun, using armour-piercing discarding sabot shot was theoretically capable of penetrating the front of the Tiger II's turret and nose (lower front hull) at 1,100 and 1,200 yd (1,000 and 1,100 m) respectively although, given the lack of a stated angle, this was presumably at the ideal 90 degrees and in combat the Tiger II was never penetrated frontally by the QF 17-Pounder.

As a result of its thick frontal armour, flanking manoeuvres were most often used against the Tiger II to attempt a shot at the thinner side and rear armour, giving a tactical advantage to the Tiger II in most engagements. Moreover, the main armament of the Tiger II was capable of knocking out any Allied tank frontally at ranges exceeding 2.5 kilometres (1.6 mi), well beyond the effective range of Allied tank guns.

=== Soviet wartime testing ===
During August 1944, two Tiger Ausf B tanks were captured by the Soviets near Sandomierz, and were soon moved to the testing grounds at Kubinka. During the transfer, the two tanks suffered from mechanical breakdowns. The cooling system was insufficient for the excessively hot weather, causing overheated engines and gearbox failure. The right suspension of one of the tanks had to be completely replaced, and its full functionality could not be re-established. The design of the track tensioning mechanism hadn't been completely perfected. As a result, the tension had to be adjusted after every 10–15 km. The 8.8 cm KwK 43 gave positive results in penetration and accuracy, which were on par with the 122 mm D-25T. It proved capable of passing completely through its "colleague", a Tiger Ausf B's turret at a range of 400 m. The armour of one vehicle was tested by firing at it with shells between 100 and 152 mm calibre. The welding was, despite careful workmanship, significantly worse than on similar designs. As a result, even when shells did not penetrate the armour, there was often a large amount of spalling from the inside of the plates, which damaged the transmission and rendered the tank inoperable. Further testing showed that the armour plate was of an inferior quality to earlier German tanks such as the Tiger I and Panther. Lab testing found the plates lacked molybdenum (ascribed to a loss of supply, being replaced by vanadium), resulting in low malleability.

The expanded firing test states that the АР projectiles from the 100 mm BS-3 and 122 mm A-19 gun penetrated a Tiger Ausf B's turret at ranges of 1000–1500 metres. However, the firing test against the turret front was conducted after removal of the gun and mantlet, and penetrations were close to openings such as vision slits and the gun location. The penetrations to the right gun opening occurred after previous 100 mm projectile penetration hits or armour damage. The 100 mm BS-3 and 122 mm A-19 could also penetrate the weld joints of the front hull at ranges of 500–600 metres after 3–4 shots.

== Surviving vehicles ==
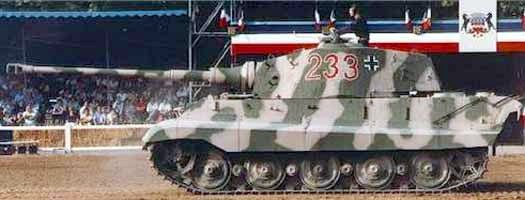
The working Tiger II of the Musée des Blindés being displayed to the public, 2005

The only working example is displayed at the Musée des Blindés, Saumur, France. It has the production turret and is accessible to the public. This tank belonged to the 3rd Company of the schwere Panzerabteilung 503. It was believed to have been abandoned by its crew on 23 August 1944, due to engine problems, at Brueil-en-Vexin, near Mantes-la-Jolie. It was salvaged by the French Army in September 1944 and then stored in a factory in Satory before being transferred to the museum in 1975. It was believed to have had turret number 123, but Colonel Michel Aubry, the founder of the museum, decided to put 233 on the turret in honour of the Tiger II that destroyed his Sherman tank at the end of the war. Today the vehicle bears its original number 300, thanks to the research work of the Musée des Blindés on historical photos. Unlike other captured German vehicles, this Tiger II was never used by the French Army. Other survivors include:

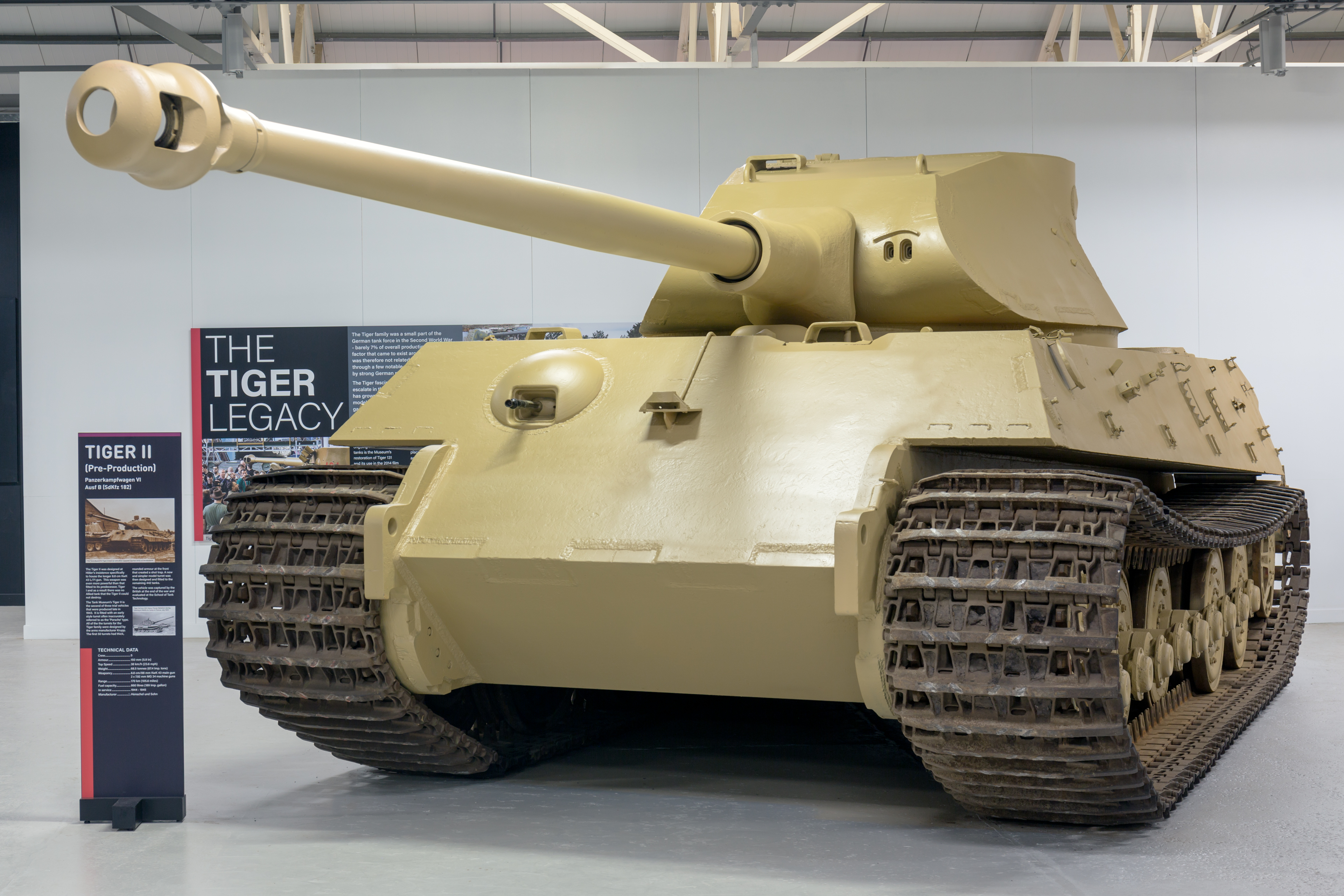
The Bovington Tank Museum's prototype Tiger II on display at the museum's Tiger Collection Exhibition, 2017

- The Tank Museum, Dorset, UK: Tiger II with early production turret is on display. This vehicle was the second soft steel prototype made and did not see active service. They have planned and started work on the restoration of making this a running and complete vehicle
- Defence Academy of the United Kingdom, Shrivenham, UK: Tiger II (production turret). This vehicle was from s.SS Pz.Abt. 501, with hull number 280093, turret number 104, and has a comprehensive coating of Zimmerit. It was claimed by Sergeant Roberts of A Squadron, 23rd Hussars, 11th Armoured Division in a Sherman tank near Beauvais, although it had already been disabled and abandoned by its crew following damage to its tracks and final drive. This vehicle is currently on display at The Tank Museum, in Dorset, UK.
- The Wheatcroft Collection, Leicestershire, UK. A private collector, Kevin Wheatcroft, is rebuilding two complete Tiger IIs. The project includes parts from many individual Tiger IIs, but many parts will be of new manufacture. Wheatcroft has stated that at least 70–80% of the vehicles will be original parts and more parts are still sourced continuously. Known and shown parts are a complete front glacis plate, 8.8 cm KwK 43 main armament, engine deck plates, approx. 1/3 hull (rear) in one part, a set of tracks, and approx. 2/3 of the left-side hull plate in two parts. The aim of the project is two complete Tiger II in running order. Details and progress on the project are ― as of 2026 ― continuously updated on The Wheatcroft Collection official Facebook page. Kevin Wheatcroft has also secured and acquired what is said to be a mostly complete third Tiger II, discovered at a scrapyard in Austria. Details on this third Tiger II have been scarce (as of June 2026) with only tidbits being disclosed so far on the official The Wheatcroft Collection Facebook page.

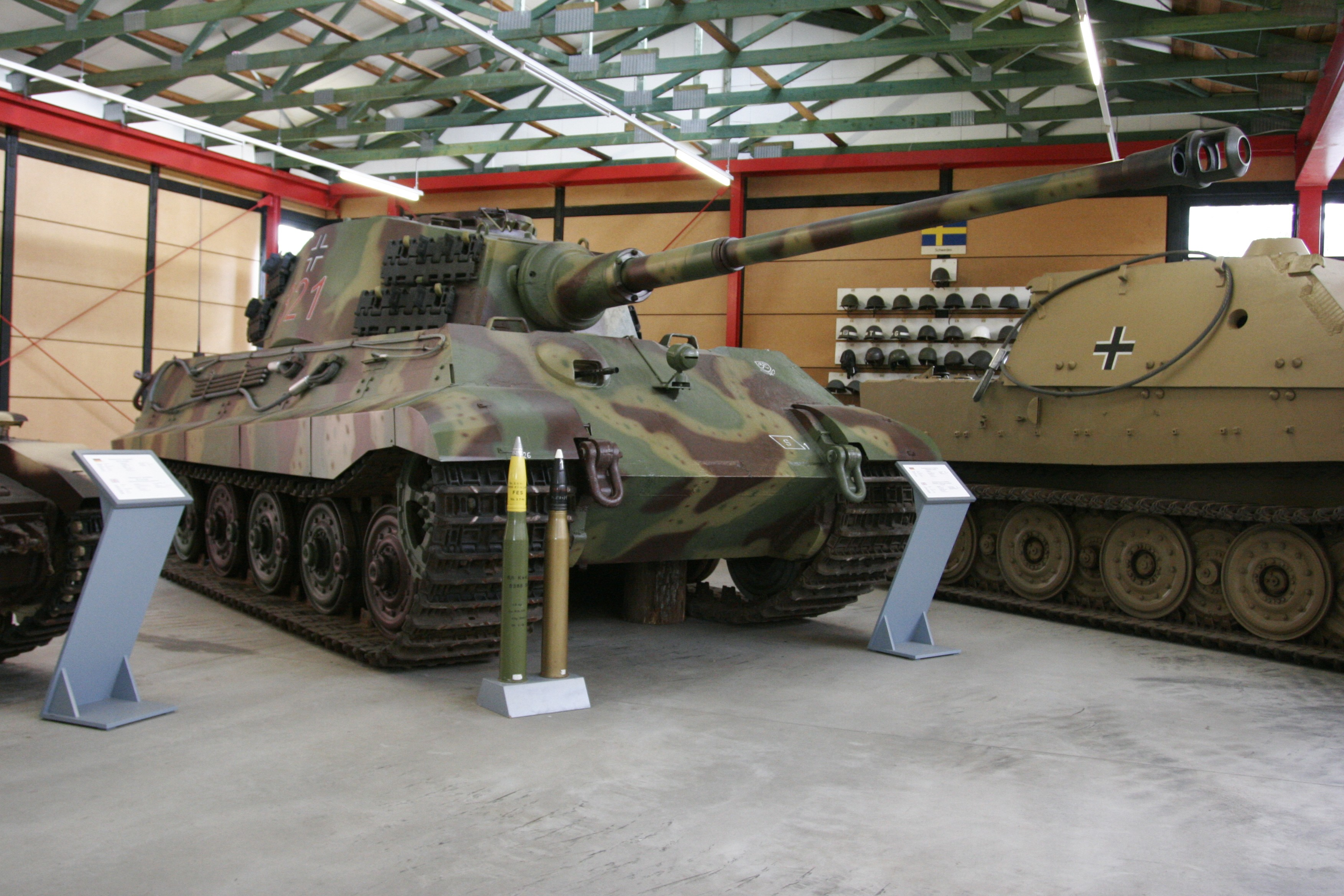
Tiger II with the production turret, at the Deutsches Panzermuseum, Germany

- Deutsches Panzermuseum, Munster, Germany: Tiger II (production turret), hull number 280101. Originally bearing turret number 121 from s.SS.Pz.Abt. 501, it was restored with a different number for unknown reasons.
- Mantes-la-Jolie, France. A more or less complete, but wrecked, Tiger II (production turret) is buried under regional road 913. Parts of the turret were recovered in a limited exploratory excavation in 2001. Further excavation halted for financial reasons. There are plans to fully excavate and restore this Tiger II for a Vexin battle memorial.

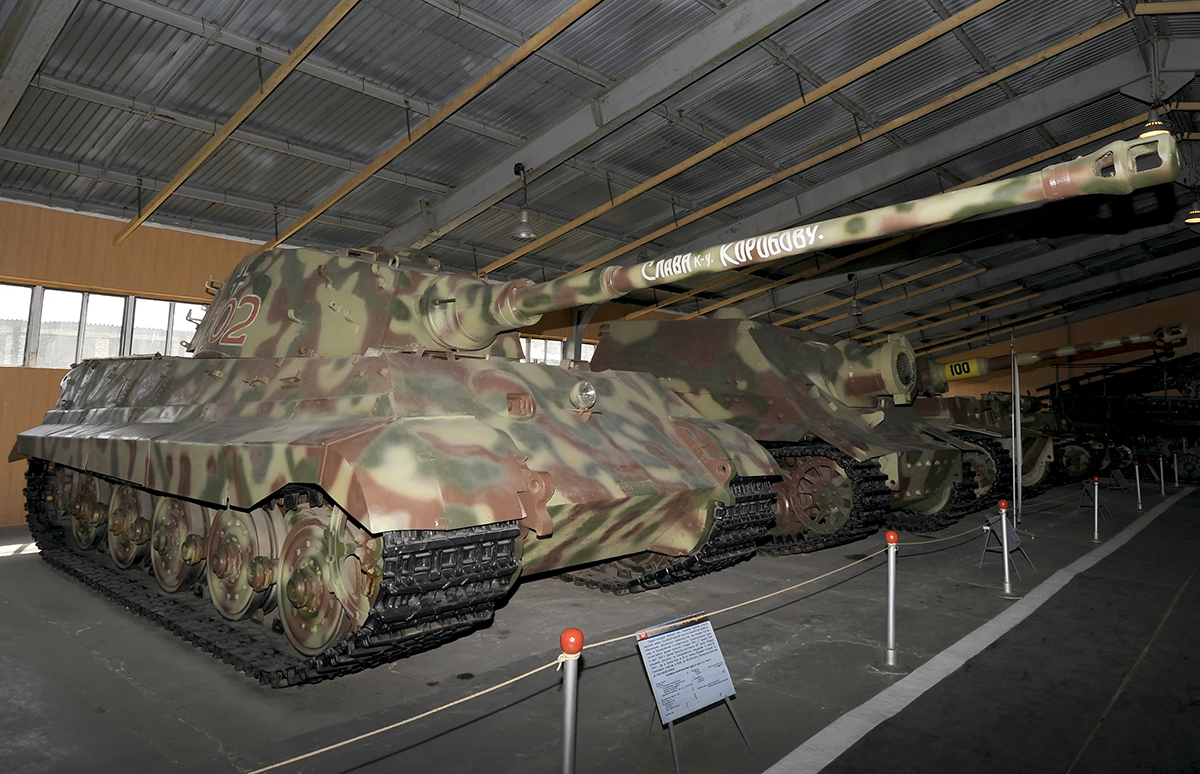
Tiger II at Kubinka Tank Museum

- Kubinka Tank Museum, Russia: Tiger II (production turret) with turret number 002 (502) captured at Oględów by the Red Army.

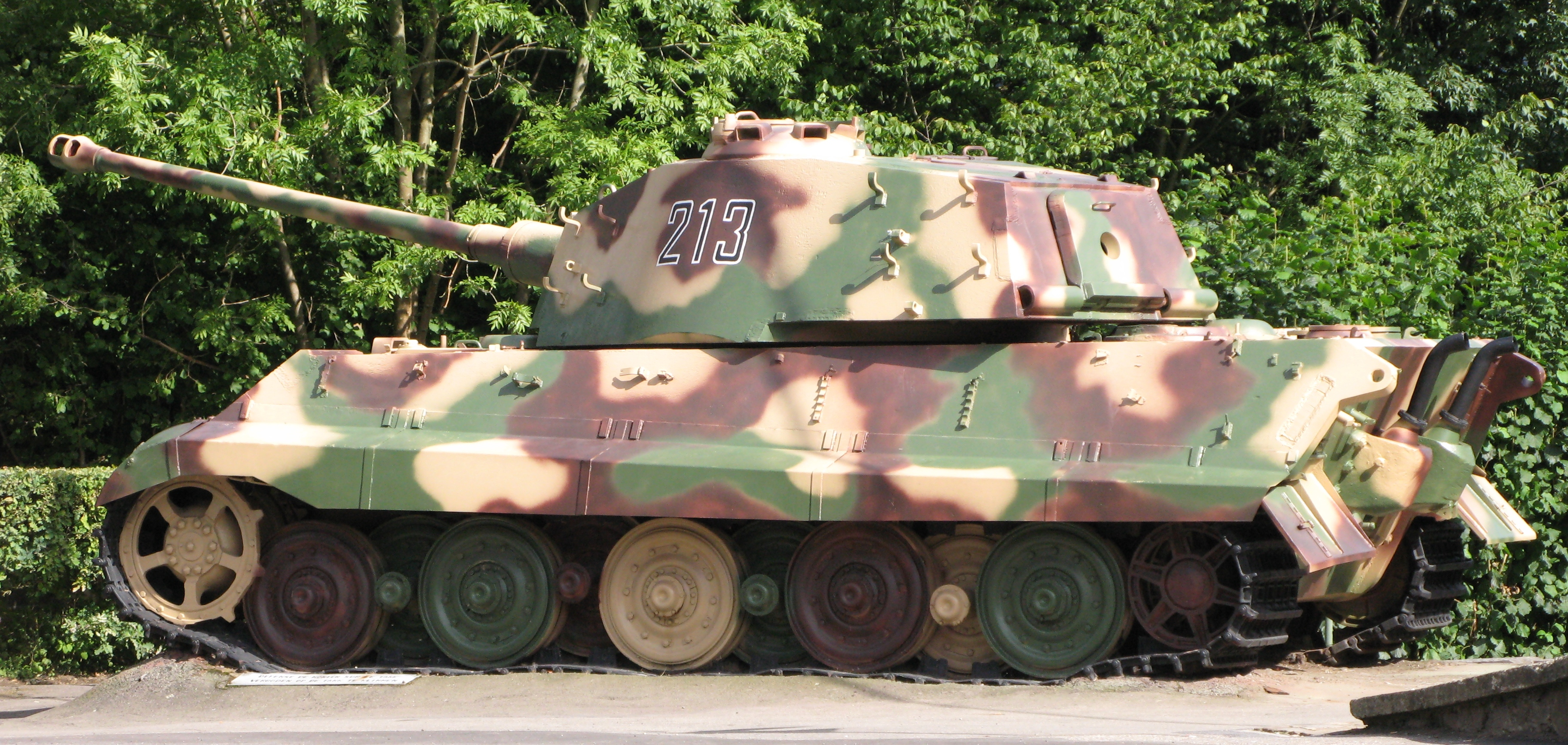
Tiger II at La Gleize, Belgium

- December 44 Museum, La Gleize, Belgium: A cosmetically restored Tiger II (production turret), hull number 280273, built in October 1944. Turret number 213 from s.SS Pz.Abt. 501. Displayed at the entrance to December 44 Museum Collections, a museum devoted entirely to the Battle of the Bulge. This tank was abandoned in La Gleize on 24 December 1944, where the advance of Kampfgruppe Peiper was halted. The front part, about 1/3, of the gun barrel is restored with a Panther gun barrel and muzzle brake. It also has restored mudguards. It is stripped of exterior and internal fittings and most of the torsion bars are broken, but it still has its gearbox and engine in place.
- U.S. Army Armor & Cavalry Collection, Fort Benning, Georgia, United States: Tiger II (production turret), hull number 280243, built in September 1944. Turret number 332 from s.SS Pz.Abt. 501. Captured during the Battle of the Bulge by Sgt. Glenn D. George of the 740th Tank Battalion of the 1st US Army on December 24, 1944. The left side was cut open for educational purposes at the Aberdeen Proving Ground in the late 1940s. Was on display at the former "Patton Museum of Cavalry & Armor, Fort Knox KY, then under BRAC transferred to Fort Benning.
- Schweizerisches Militärmuseum Full, Switzerland. This Tiger II (production turret) was previously displayed in the Thun Tank Museum, and was loaned to the Schweizerisches Militärmuseum Full in September 2006). This tank was given to Switzerland by France after the war. Hull number 280215 from s.H.Pz.Abt. 506. As of 2021, it is in the process of being restored to working order.

== See also ==
- List of military vehicles of World War II
- List of World War II military vehicles of Germany
- List of Sd.Kfz. designations
- List of WWII Maybach engines
- VK 45.02 (P) heavy tank project
- Geschützwagen Tiger

=== Tanks of comparable role, performance and era ===
- Soviet IS-3 heavy tank, entered service in 1945
- United States T26E4 "Super Pershing" heavy tank
- French ARL 44, produced and served in limited numbers in the late 1940s and early 1950s
- French AMX-50, several prototypes produced in the late 1940s and early 1950s
