= 233rd Division =

233rd Division may refer to:

- 233rd Reserve Panzer Division, Wehrmacht, Germany
- 233rd Rifle Division, Soviet Union

== See also ==
- List of military divisions by number
- 233rd (disambiguation)
