= Mainville =

Mainville may refer to:

- Mainville (surname)
- Mainville, Pennsylvania, a census-designated place in Columbia County, Pennsylvania, United States
- Mairy-Mainville, a commune in Meurthe-et-Moselle department, France
