= Hans Mikosch =

- Born: 7 January 1898; Kattowitz, German Empire
- Died: 18 January 1993 (aged 95); Reichshof, Germany
- Military career
- Allegiance: German Empire; Weimar Republic; Nazi Germany
- Branch: Army
- Service years: 1914–1920; 1935–1945
- Rank: Generalleutnant
- Commands: 10th Panzergrenadier Division; 13th Panzer Division
- Conflicts: World War I World War II: Invasion of Poland; Battle of Fort Eben-Emael; Battle of France; Operation Barbarossa; Battle of Stalingrad; East Prussian Offensive
- Awards: Knight's Cross of the Iron Cross with Oak Leaves

Hans Mikosch (7 January 1898 – 18 January 1993) was a German general (Generalleutnant) in the Wehrmacht during World War II who commanded the 10th Panzergrenadier Division and then the 13th Panzer Division. He was a recipient of the Knight's Cross of the Iron Cross with Oak Leaves. Mikosch surrendered to the Red Army in April 1945; he remained in captivity until 1955.

== Biography ==
Born in 1898, Mikosch volunteered for the army of Imperial Germany in 1914. After two years service in World War I, he received a commission in an engineer battalion. After the war, he joined the police force where he remained for several years until he rejoined the German Army in 1935 as an engineer. With the rank of Oberstleutnant (lieutenant colonel), he commanded the 51st Engineer Battalion which fought in the Battle of Poland in 1939 and assisted in the capture of Fort Eben-Emael in Belgium on 11 May 1940. Shortly afterwards, he was awarded the Knight's Cross of the Iron Cross.

Promoted to Oberst (colonel) in 1942, Mikosch was commander of the 677th Pioneer Regiment, which took part in the Battle of Stalingrad and saw him awarded the Knight's Cross of the Iron Cross with Oak Leaves, and the following year, was temporary commander of the 10th Panzergrenadier Division from late July to late December, during which it fought in Operation Citadel and the Battle of Kiev. He then took command of the 13th Panzer Division on 23 December. His new command, which had been heavily engaged on the Eastern Front, was withdrawn from the front and underwent a refit. During this time he was promoted to Generalmajor (equivalent to the rank of brigadier general in the United States Army). On its return to the front, the 13th Panzer Division took part in the Battle of the Korsun–Cherkassy Pocket and the subsequent retreat to the Bug River.

After his period in command of the 13th Panzer Division ended in May 1944, Mikosch took up a post as commandant of the town of Boulogne in France. He later commanded Higher Engineering Command XIII and then towards the end of the war, he was responsible for fortifications in East Prussia. Having been promoted to Generalleutnant (equivalent to the rank of major general in the United States Army) the previous month, he surrendered to the Soviet forces on 8 April 1945. He was held in the Soviet Union for over 10 years before being released. He later lived in Westphalia, where he died in 1993.

== Awards and decorations ==
- Iron Cross (1914) 2nd & 1st Class
- Iron Cross (1939) 2nd & 1st Class
- German Cross in Gold on 13 November 1942 as Oberst and commander of 677th Pioneer Regiment
- Knight's Cross of the Iron Cross on 21 May 1940 as Oberstleutnant and commander of 51st Pioneer Battalion
- Knight's Cross of the Iron Cross with Oak Leaves on 6 March 1943 as Oberst and commander of 677th Pioneer Regiment and leader of Kampfgruppe im Raum Stalingrad

== Notes ==
Military offices
Preceded by Generalmajor August Schmidt	Commander of 10th Panzergrenadier Division; July 1943 – December 1943	Succeeded by Generalmajor August Schmidt
Preceded by Generalmajor Eduard Hauser	Commander of 13th Panzer Division; 23 December 1943 – 17 May 1944	Succeeded by Oberst Freiderich von Hake
