= 273rd Division =

273rd Division may refer to:

- 273rd Infantry Division, Wehrmacht, Germany
- 273rd Reserve Panzer Division, Wehrmacht, Germany
- 273rd Rifle Division, Soviet Union

== See also ==
- List of military divisions by number
