= Eberhard Rodt =

German general

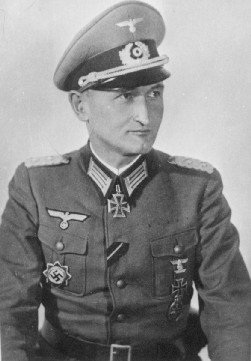
- Born: 4 December 1895; Munich, German Empire
- Died: 14 December 1979 (aged 84); Munich, West Germany
- Military career
- Allegiance: Nazi Germany
- Branch: Army (Wehrmacht)
- Service years: 1914–1945
- Rank: Generalleutnant
- Commands: 22nd Panzer Division; 15th Panzergrenadier Division
- Conflicts: World War II
- Awards: Knight's Cross of the Iron Cross with Oak Leaves

Eberhard Rodt (4 December 1895 – 14 December 1979) was a German general during World War II who commanded several divisions. He was a recipient of the Knight's Cross of the Iron Cross with Oak Leaves of Nazi Germany.

On 25 August 1941, he took an important role in the German capture of Dnipropetrovsk. Rodt, then a colonel within 13th Panzer Division, seized a Soviet pontoon bridge across the Dnieper river after Red Army forces had destroyed all fortified bridges across the river in the city. Rodt's ad hoc decision allowed German forces to establish a preliminary bridgehead on the east shore of the river, providing cover for the forces of the III Army Corps to begin their crossing.

== Awards and decorations ==
- Iron Cross (1914) 2nd Class (30 July 1915) & 1st Class (10 August 1918)
- Clasp to the Iron Cross 2nd Class (21 May 1940) & 1st Class (21 May 1940)
- German Cross in Gold on 23 August 1942 as Oberst in the 22. Schützen-Brigade
- Knight's Cross of the Iron Cross with Oak Leaves
  - Knight's Cross on 25 June 1940 as Oberstleutnant and commander of Aufklärungs-Abteilung 25
  - Oak Leaves on 28 April 1945 as Generalleutnant and commander of 15. Panzergrenadier-Division

Military offices
Preceded by Generalleutnant Hellmut von der Chevallerie	Commander of 22. Panzer-Division; 1 November 1942 – 3 March 1943	Succeeded by Unit disbanded
Preceded by Generalleutnant Willibald Borowietz	Commander of 15. Panzergrenadier-Division; 1 July 1943 – October 1943	Succeeded by Generalleutnant Ernst-Günther Baade
Preceded by Generalleutnant Ernst-Günther Baade	Commander of 15. Panzergrenadier-Division; 20 November 1943 – 5 September 1944	Succeeded by Generalleutnant Karl-Theodor Simon
