= 13th Panzer Division =

German army division during World War II

- 13. Panzer-Division
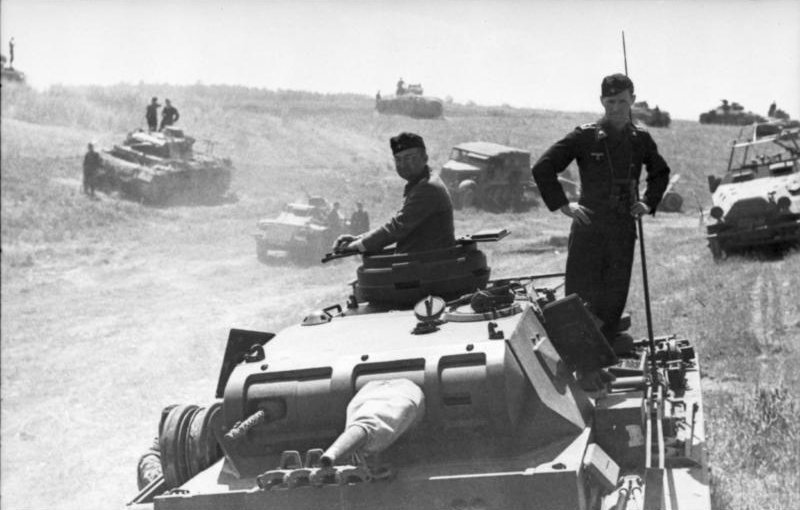
- 13th Panzer Division during Operation Barbarossa
- Active: 11 October 1940 – January 1945
- Country: Germany
- Branch: German Heer
- Type: Panzer
- Role: Armoured warfare
- Size: Division
- Part of: Wehrmacht
- Garrison/HQ: Wehrkreis XI: Magdeburg
- Engagements: World War II; Operation Barbarossa; Battle of the Caucasus; Second Jassy–Kishinev offensive; Battle of Debrecen; Siege of Budapest

Insignia

The 13th Panzer Division (English: 13th Armoured Division) was a unit of the German Army during World War II, established in 1940.

The division was organized under the code name Infantry Command IV (Infanterieführer IV) in October 1934. On October 15, 1935, following Germany's open rejection of terms of the Treaty of Versailles restricting Germany's military, the division was designated the 13th Infantry Division (13. Infanterie-Division). The division was motorized during the winter of 1936–1937, and was accordingly renamed the 13th Motorized Infantry Division (13. Infanterie-Division (motorisiert)) on October 12, 1937. The 13th Motorized Infantry Division participated in the campaigns against Poland (1939) and western Europe (1940). Following the Fall of France in June 1940, on October 11, 1940, the division was reorganized as the 13th Panzer Division (13. Panzer-Division). It participated in Operation Barbarossa (the invasion of the USSR) in 1941 and the advance on the Caucasus in 1942. The division suffered heavy losses in the retreats of 1943 and 1944. It was partially refitted in Hungary, where it was encircled and destroyed by Red Army in the winter of 1944–1945. The formation was reformed as Panzer Division Feldherrnhalle 2 in the spring of 1945 and surrendered in May 1945.

During the invasion of Poland, the troops of the division committed war crimes, including reprisal killings, using civilians as human shields, and destroying a medical column.

== Operational history ==
The 13th Motorized Infantry Division participated in the invasion of Poland, as part of the southern thrust, and the Battle of France, advancing through Belgium towards Calais and on to Lyon.

The 13th Panzer Division was formed in Vienna in October 1940 from the 13th Motorized Infantry Division and was immediately sent to Romania but was not part of the Balkan campaign. It served in Operation Barbarossa as part of Panzer Group 1 (Army Group South), and it contributed to the successful encirclements of the Soviet forces at Kiev. At the end of 1941, it was positioned at Rostov; however, it was forced to retreat due to fierce Soviet counter-attacks.

In 1942 and 1943, the division formed part of the First Panzer Army (Army Group A); it was involved in the battles for the Caucasus oil fields and at the Kuban Peninsula after the Battle of Stalingrad. In the fall of 1943, it was withdrawn to Western Ukraine, where it fought defensive battles near the river Dniepr.

On 20 November, the 13th Panzer Division possessed 32 tanks (of which 15 were operational).

The offensive of the Soviet Army pushed the Germans to their starting positions of June 1941. The 13th Panzer Division was attached to Army Group South Ukraine, which had orders to stop the Soviets from capturing the Romanian oil fields. The division was reformed in July 1944 and it received modern equipment, including the Panther G tank and the Jagdpanzer IV. The Red Army offensive of August 1944 resulted in the deaths or imprisonment of most of the division.

In the Battle of Debrecen, the division helped to annihilate three Soviet corps; however, it was encircled in Budapest at the end of 1944 and destroyed in January 1945.

In the spring of 1945, the division was reformed under the name Feldherrnhalle 2. The last engagements with the Soviets were fought on the Austro-Hungarian border. The division surrendered in Austria in May 1945.

== War crimes ==
During the invasion of Poland, the division used civilians as human shields in the battle with the retreating Polish Prusy Army and on September 8, 1939, attacked a medical column marked with the Red Cross signs near Odrzywół. A day later, soldiers from the division took part in the revenge killing of 11 civilians and two Polish priests including Dean Stanisław Klimecki in the nearby town of Drzewica in retaliation for their own military losses. Killings have also been reported in nearby settlements of Gielniów, Kamienna Wola, Klwów, Ossa, Przysucha, Potok, Rozwady and Zarzęcin.

On 24 May 1940 troops of the division executed roughly 50 wounded Senegalese tirailleurs of the French 24e Regiment de Tirailleurs Sénégalais after capturing the village of Aubigny on the Somme.

== Commanders ==
The commanders of the division:

Infantry Command IV (Infanterieführer IV), 13th Infantry Division (13. Infanterie-Division), and 13th Motorized Infantry Division (13. Infanterie-Division (motorisiert))

- Generalleutnant Paul Otto (1 October 1934 – 20 August 1939)

13th Motorized Infantry Division (13. Infanterie-Division (motorisiert))

- Generalleutnant Moritz von Faber du Faur (21 August 1939 – 6 September 1939)
- Generalleutnant Paul Otto (7 September – 31 October 1939)

13th Motorized Infantry Division (13. Infanterie-Division (motorisiert)), and 13th Panzer Division (13. Panzer-Division)

- Generalleutnant Friedrich-Wilhelm von Rothkirch und Panthen (1 November 1939 – 13 June 1941)

13th Panzer Division (13. Panzer-Division)

- Generalleutnant Walter Düvert (14 June 1941 – 28 November 1941)
- General der Panzertruppe Traugott Herr (29 November 1941 – 1 November 1942)
- (acting) Oberst Walter Kuehn (1 October 1942 – 31 October 1942)
- Generalleutnant Hellmut von der Chevallerie (1 November 1942 – 30 November 1942)
- Generalmajor Wilhelm Crisolli (1 December 1942 – 14 May 1943)
- Generalleutnant Hellmut von der Chevallerie (15 May 1943 – 31 August 1943)
- Generalleutnant Eduard Hauser (1 September 1943 – 22 December 1943)
- Generalleutnant Hans Mikosch (23 December 1943 – 17 May 1944)
- Oberst Friedrich-Erdmann von Hake (18 May 1944 – 24 May 1944)
- Generalleutnant Hans Tröger (25 May 1944 – 8 September 1944)
- Generalmajor Gerhard Schmidhuber (9 September 1944 – 11 February 1945)
- Oberstleutnant d.R. Wilhelm Schöning (12 February 1945 – )

== Organisation ==
The organisation of the division in October 1944:

- Panzer-Regiment 4
- Panzer-Grenadier-Regiment 66
- Panzer-Grenadier-Regiment 93
- Panzer-Artillerie-Regiment 13
- Feldersatz-Battalion 13
- Panzer-Aufklärungs-Abteilung 13
- Heeres-Flak-Artillerie-Abteilung 271
- Panzerjäger-Abteilung 13
- Panzer-Pionier-Battalion 4
- Panzer-Nachrichten-Abteilung 13
- Panzer-Versorgungstruppen 13

== See also ==
- SS Panzer Division order of battle
- Panzer division
