= 273rd Infantry Division =

German military unit of WWII

The 273rd Infantry Division was a planned infantry division of the German Wehrmacht during World War II. Its deployment was attempted twice, once in 1940 and once in 1945. The former deployment was interrupted after the German victory in the Battle of France, and the latter deployment never came to full strength due to the imminent end of the war.

== History ==
The assembly of the 273rd Infantry Division was ordered on 22 May 1940, along with the assemblies of the other divisions of the tenth Aufstellungswelle. (Note: The other divisions of the tenth wave included the 270th, 271st, 272nd, 276th, 277th, 278th, 279th, and 280th divisions.) The 273rd Infantry Division was to be assembled by Wehrkreis III (Berlin), but its deployment, due to be completed by 1 July 1940, was cancelled after the Armistice of 22 June between Germany and France. While some of the other divisions of the tenth wave, all of which had seen their deployments cancelled in the same way as that of the 273rd Infantry Division, would be deployed at a later state in the war, the designation "273rd Infantry Division" was not used again.

The planned structure of the 273rd Infantry Division included the three Infantry Regiments 544, 545, and 546, as well as the Artillery Detachment 273 and the Division Units 273, the latter including Panzerjäger, pioneer, and intelligence companies. While the 273rd Infantry Division itself initially did not see full redeployment, its subordinate regiments did. The three infantry regiments were deployed on 27 January 1942 at Milovice military base, were redesignated Grenadier Regiments 544, 545, and 546 on 15 October 1942, and destroyed as part of the 389th Infantry Division at the Battle of Stalingrad between January and February 1943. They were subsequently reassembled under supervision of the 7th Army, sent back to the Eastern Front to fight in the Korsun–Cherkassy Pocket and were eventually trapped at Danzig in 1945.

In November 1943, the ordinal number 273 was used for the 273rd Reserve Panzer Division, which was active until March 1944.

In April 1945, a second 273rd Infantry Division was deployed as one of the last desperate formations during the final stages of the war. It never reached the full strength of an infantry division. It was sent to the Eastern Front, where the heavily battered 16th Hungarian Infantry Division was attached to it. The 273rd Infantry Division ended the war in Czechoslovakia.
