= Klata =

Klata may refer to:

- Klata language, Austronesian language of the Philippines
- Klata (surname)
