= Hellmut von der Chevallerie =

- Born: 9 November 1896; Berlin, Province of Brandenburg, German Empire
- Died: 1 June 1965 (aged 68); Wiesbaden, Hesse, West Germany
- Relatives: Kurt von der Chevallerie (brother)
- Military career
- Allegiance: German Empire (to 1918); Weimar Republic (to 1933); Nazi Germany
- Branch: Prussian Army; Imperial German Army; Freikorps; Reichswehr; German Army
- Service years: 1914–45
- Rank: General of the Infantry
- Commands: 22nd Panzer Division; 13th Panzer Division; 273rd Reserve Panzer Division
- Conflicts: First World War; Second World War: Battle of France; Operation Barbarossa; Battle of Białystok–Minsk; Battle of Smolensk (1941); Battle of Moscow; Battles of Rzhev; Battle of the Caucasus; Lower Dnieper Offensive
- Awards: Knight's Cross of the Iron Cross

Gustav Hans Erdmann Hellmuth von der Chevallerie (9 November 1896 – 1 June 1965) was a highly decorated General of the Infantry in the German Wehrmacht during the Second World War, who commanded the 13th Panzer Division. He was also a recipient of the Knight's Cross of the Iron Cross, which was awarded by Nazi Germany to recognize battlefield bravery or successful military leadership. Chevallerie was captured by Allied troops in 1945 and was released in 1947.

== World War II ==
Chevallerie began World War II as Adjutant to the general staff of XII. Army Corps under Army Group C in Wiesbaden, where he had been posted since 6 October 1936. In January 1940, he was moved into the command staff of a reserve infantry regiment. In July 1940, Chevallerie took command of an infantry regiment in the 10th Panzer Division, and 2nd Army, then 1st Army. He led this unit into the Battle of France.

In mid-1941, Chevallerie's regiment (as part of the 10th Panzer Division, 2nd Panzer Group), Army Group Center fought in the areas of Minsk and Smolensk, and was awarded two Clasp to the Iron Cross medals in July 1941 and promoted to Oberst in December. On 9 March 1942 he took command of the 10th Rifle Brigade, and kept this command after its re-designation as 10th Panzergrenadier-Division. On 19 April 1942, he was awarded the German Cross in Gold.

After spending parts of the summer 1942 in reserve, he took command of 22nd Panzer Division on 8 October 1942, which was in reserve in the Don River curve at the time. On 1 November 1942 he was promoted to Generalmajor and was given command of 13th Panzer Division, which he led into the Battle of the Caucasus. Severely wounded just one month into his command, he had to give up his command to his deputy Wilhelm Crisolli on 1 December 1942, and did not return to command until 15 May 1943. In the meantime, he had been awarded Knight's Cross of the Iron Cross on 30 April 1943 and had been promoted to Generalleutnant on 1 May 1943. On 25 October 1943 he was wounded again and was moved to the reserve (Führerreserve).

On 15 November 1943 he took command of the 273rd Reserve Panzer Division in the southwest of France, and went back into the reserve on 10 May 1944. On 15 August 1944 he took command of 233rd Reserve Panzer Division in Denmark. On 1 November 1944 he was given command of the Truppenübungsplatz Bergen, and went back into reserve on 20 February 1945. On 1 April 1945 he took command of the Sudentengau, which he handed over on 9 May 1945 upon the capitulation of Germany, and entered confinement as a prisoner-of-war until June 1947.

== Awards and decorations ==
- Iron Cross (1914), 2nd and 1st Class
  - 2nd Class (24 April 1915)
  - 1st Class (20 October 1916)
- Wound Badge (1918) in Black on 8 December 1919
- Honour Cross of the World War 1914/1918 with Swords on 20 December 1934
- Wehrmacht Long Service Award, 4th to 1st Class
- West Wall Medal on 22 November 1940
- Clasp to the Iron Cross (1939), 2nd and 1st Class
  - 2nd Class (8 July 1941)
  - 1st Class (20 July 1941)
- Panzer Badge on 13 August 1941
- Wound Badge (1939) in Gold on 20 December 1941
- German Cross in Gold (19 April 1942)
- Eastern Medal on 14 December 1942
- Knight's Cross of the Iron Cross on 30 April 1943 as Generalmajor and commander of 13. Panzer-Division
- Order of Michael the Brave, 3rd Class on 20 October 1943
- Kuban Shield on 1 June 1944

Military offices
Preceded by Generalleutnant Wilhelm von Apell	Commander of 22. Panzer-Division; 7 October 1942 – 1 November 1942	Succeeded by Generalleutnant Eberhard Rodt
Preceded by General der Panzertruppe Traugott Herr	Commander of 13. Panzer-Division; 1 November 1942 – 1 December 1942	Succeeded by Generalmajor Wilhelm Crisolli
Preceded by Generalmajor Wilhelm Crisolli	Commander of 13. Panzer-Division; 15 May 1943 – 1 September 1943	Succeeded by Generalleutnant Eduard Hauser
