= Myslakowice =

Myslakowice may refer to the following places in Poland:

- Mysłakowice, Lower Silesian Voivodeship (south-west Poland)
- Myślakowice, Masovian Voivodeship (east-central Poland)
