= Eduard Hauser =

Eduard Hauser may refer to:

- Eduard Hauser (cross-country skier) (born 1948), Swiss former cross-country skier
- Eduard Hauser (soldier) (1895–1961), Generalleutnant in the Wehrmacht during World War II
