= 233rd Brigade =

233rd Brigade may refer to:

- 233rd Brigade (United Kingdom)
- 233rd Brigade, Royal Field Artillery, United Kingdom

== See also ==
- 233rd (disambiguation)
