= Battle of Mairy =

1944 battle of World War II

- Part of the Lorraine Campaign, World War II
Date	7 - 8 September 1944
Location	Mairy-Mainville, Lorraine, France
Result	United States victory

Belligerents
(Nazi Germany) Germany	United States

Commanders and leaders
Johannes Blaskowitz; Franz Bäke	George S. Patton; Raymond S. McLain

Units involved
(Nazi Germany) Panzer Brigade 106	(United States) 90th Infantry Division

The Battle of Mairy started on the evening of 7 September 1944, and ended on the morning of 8 September 1944. The centre of the battle was around the French village of Mairy-Mainville, although other fighting, some of it significant, took place in and around other French towns in the vicinity, including Avril, Mont-Bonvilliers, Landres, and Mercy. The battle took place in the European Theatre of Operations during World War II, and was fought between the German Panzer Brigade 106 and the US 90th Infantry Division.

The 358th Infantry Regiment defended the 90th Division's headquarters and theTucquegnieux-Mancieulles road junction from an attack by Panzer Brigade 106 from Audun-le-Roman. The German forces lost almost all of their vehicles, around 100 in number, including 30 tanks. The attack had been intended to provide a route for the retreat of the 48th Infantry Division and 15th Panzer Grenadier Division. It was the last armoured engagement in the western Moselle area.

The battle was a victory for the United States, and the attack of Panzer Brigade 106 resulted in the near destruction of this armoured formation, effectively removing its power, and severely reducing the capabilities of the four Panzer Brigades, of which 106 was one, for the up-coming Lorraine counter-offensive.
