= 265th Division =

265th Division may refer to:

- 265th Infantry Division, Wehrmacht, Germany
- 265th Rifle Division, Soviet Union, later the 265th Motor Rifle Division

== See also ==
- List of military divisions by number
