= Battle of Ossa =

- Part of the January Uprising
Date	10 July 1863
Location	Ossa
Result	Polish victory

Belligerents
(Poland) Polish insurgents	Russian Empire

Commanders and leaders
Ludwik Żychliński	

Strength
1,300	

Casualties and losses
4 dead and 16 wounded	28 dead and 5 POWs

The Battle of Ossa, one of many clashes of the January Uprising, took place on July 10, 1863, near the village of Ossa, which at that time belonged to Russian-controlled Congress Poland. An insurgent unit under Ludwik Żychliński clashed with a detachment of the Imperial Russian Army.

Polish forces numbered well over 1,000 men (200 zouaves, 300 riflemen, 600 kosynierzy and additional 200 insurgents who lacked any weapons). They camped at Ossa, and began their military exercises, when on July 10, 1863 at 6 p.m., were attacked by the Russians. The attack was fought off by the zouaves, who, with support of the kosynierzy, managed to break Russian positions. The Russians retreated towards Nowe Miasto nad Pilicą, leaving behind 28 bodies. Polish losses were 4 dead and 16 wounded.

== Sources ==
- Stefan Kieniewicz: Powstanie styczniowe. Warszawa: Państwowe Wydawnictwo Naukowe, 1983. ISBN 83-01-03652-4.
