= 22nd Panzer Division =

German army division during World War II

- 22. Panzer-Division
- Unit insignia
- Active: 1941–43
- Country: Germany
- Branch: Army
- Type: Panzer
- Role: Armoured warfare
- Size: Division
- Garrison/HQ: Wehrkreis XII: Schwetzingen
- Engagements: World War II; Crimean campaign; Siege of Sevastopol; Case Blue; Operation Uranus

Commanders
- Notable commanders: Wilhelm von Apell; Hellmut von der Chevallerie; Eberhard Rodt

The 22nd Panzer Division was a German Panzer Division in World War II. It was formed September 1941 in France. It was transferred to the southern sector of the Eastern Front in March 1942. The 22nd was the last Panzer Division to be issued with the Czech-built Panzer 38(t), which was considered under-gunned, under-armoured and obsolete by 1942.

== History ==
Officially formed on 25 September 1941 in France the division was initially equipped with obsolete Czech, French and German tanks.

The 22nd Panzer Division was sent to the Eastern Front in February 1942. Upon arrival on the Crimean theater, where Soviet 51st Army had gone on the offensive against German XXXXII Corps on 13 March, two detachments of Panzer Regiment 204 were hurriedly thrown into action on the orders of Erich von Manstein at 06:00 on 20 March 1942. Under command of Oberstleutnant Wilhelm Koppenburg, the 204th Regiment's detachment got disoriented in deep fog, with one running into a Soviet minefield and the other suffering an ambush by Soviet 45mm antitank guns and a counterattack by Soviet 55th Tank Brigade. By 09:00, the attack had to be aborted, with I./204 suffering a 40% casualty rate and the division losing 32 out of its 142 tanks, including nine Panzer IIs, 17 Panzer 38(t)s, and six Panzer IVs. The 22nd Panzer Division was subsequently significantly delayed in its operational readiness. Robert Forczyk judges the attack by 204th Panzer Regiment on 20 March 1942 as "one of the most badly bungled German armored attacks of the entire war on the Eastern Front".

In May 1942, the division was sent north to the Kharkov area and then took part in the 1942 summer offensive against Soviet forces in the Don River bend leading to the Battle of Stalingrad. The 22nd fought in the Battle of Rostov in July 1942.

Together with the 1st Romanian Armoured Division (equipped with the also obsolete R2, similar to Panzer 35(t)), the 22nd Panzer Division comprised the XXXXVIII Panzer Corps and was next tasked with defending the northern flank of the ill-fated German 6th Army at Stalingrad. Lieutenant General Ferdinand Heim was the corps commander.

On 19 November 1942 Operation Uranus began. The great Soviet counter-offensive encircled the German 6th Army and much of the 4th Panzer Army and smashed the XXXXVIII Panzer Corps, including the 22nd Panzer Division. Many of the division's tanks had been parked in dugouts for an extended period of time and protected from the frost by straw. When the tanks were called on to respond to the Soviet offensive, many could not be started because mice had sought refuge in the straw and then in the tanks where they chewed up the insulation of electric system wires. The ability of the division to put up effective resistance was also compromised by the prior piecemeal deployment of division assets to shore up the Romanian line.

According to Beevor, the division had as few as 30 serviceable Panzer 38t's with which to meet the onslaught of the T-34s of the Soviet 1st Tank Corps. Contradictory orders directing the panzers in two different directions only aggravated an already hopeless situation.

After desperate fighting around the Russian town of Petshany on 19–22 November 1942, the 22nd was virtually destroyed with survivors making their way southwest to and across the river Chir to join various ad hoc Kampfgruppen. For its part, the Romanian 1st Armored Division lost 60% of its combat strength and crossed the Chir River with only nineteen of its original eighty four serviceable R-2s. The 22nd Panzer Division was subsequently disbanded in April 1943.

General Heim of the XXXXVIII Panzer Corps was relieved of command and retired in disgrace, only to be recalled to active duty in 1944 to command the hopeless defense of Boulogne, France.

== Commanders ==
The commanders of the division:

- Generalleutnant Wilhelm von Apell (25 September 1941 - 7 October 1942)
- Generalleutnant Hellmut von der Chevallerie (7 October 1942 - 1 November 1942)
- Generalleutnant Eberhard Rodt (1 November 1942 - 4 March 1943)
