= Panzer division (Wehrmacht) =

German armored military unit of WWII

Panzer division (1939)
- Panzerdivision (1939) — PzDiv —
- (US Army Map Symbol: Panzer Division)
- Active: 1939–1945
- Country: Germany
- Branch: German Army
- Type: Panzer
- Role: Armoured warfare
- Size: 11,792 personnel (1939): 394 officers; 115 officials; 1,962 NCOs; 9,320 enlisted
- Part of: Wehrmacht
- Engagements: World War II

A Panzer division was one of the armored (tank) divisions in the army of Nazi Germany during World War II. Panzer divisions were the key element of German success in the blitzkrieg operations of the early years of World War II. Later the Waffen-SS formed its own panzer divisions, and the Luftwaffe fielded an elite panzer division: the Hermann Göring Division.

A panzer division was a combined arms formation, having both tanks (German: Panzerkampfwagen, transl. armored fighting vehicle, usually shortened to "Panzer"), mechanized and motorized infantry, along with artillery, anti-aircraft and other integrated support elements. At the start of the war, panzer divisions were more effective than the equivalent Allied armored divisions due to their combined arms doctrine, even though they had fewer and generally less technically advanced tanks. By mid-war, though German tanks had often become technically superior to Allied tanks, Allied armored warfare and combined arms doctrines generally caught up with the Germans, and shortages reduced the combat readiness of panzer divisions. The proportions of the components of panzer divisions changed over time.

The World War II German equivalent of a mechanized infantry division is Panzergrenadierdivision ('armored infantry division'). This is similar to a panzer division, but with a higher proportion of infantry and assault guns and fewer tanks.

== Pre-war development ==
Heinz Guderian first proposed the formation of panzer units larger than a regiment, but the inspector of motorized troops, Otto von Stuelpnagel, rejected the proposal. After his replacement by Oswald Lutz, Guderian's mentor, the idea gained more support in the Wehrmacht, and after 1933 was also supported by Adolf Hitler. The first three panzer divisions were formed on 15 October 1935. The 1st Panzerdivision was formed in Weimar and commanded by Maximilian von Weichs, the 2nd Panzerdivision was formed in Würzburg and commanded by Guderian, and the 3rd Panzerdivision was formed in Berlin and commanded by Ernst Feßmann.

Most other armies of the era organized their tanks into "tank brigades" that required additional infantry and artillery support. Panzer divisions had their own organic infantry and artillery support. This led to a change in operational doctrine: instead of the tanks supporting operations by other arms, the tanks led operations, with other arms supporting them. Since the panzer divisions had the supporting arms included, they could operate independently from other units.

== World War II ==
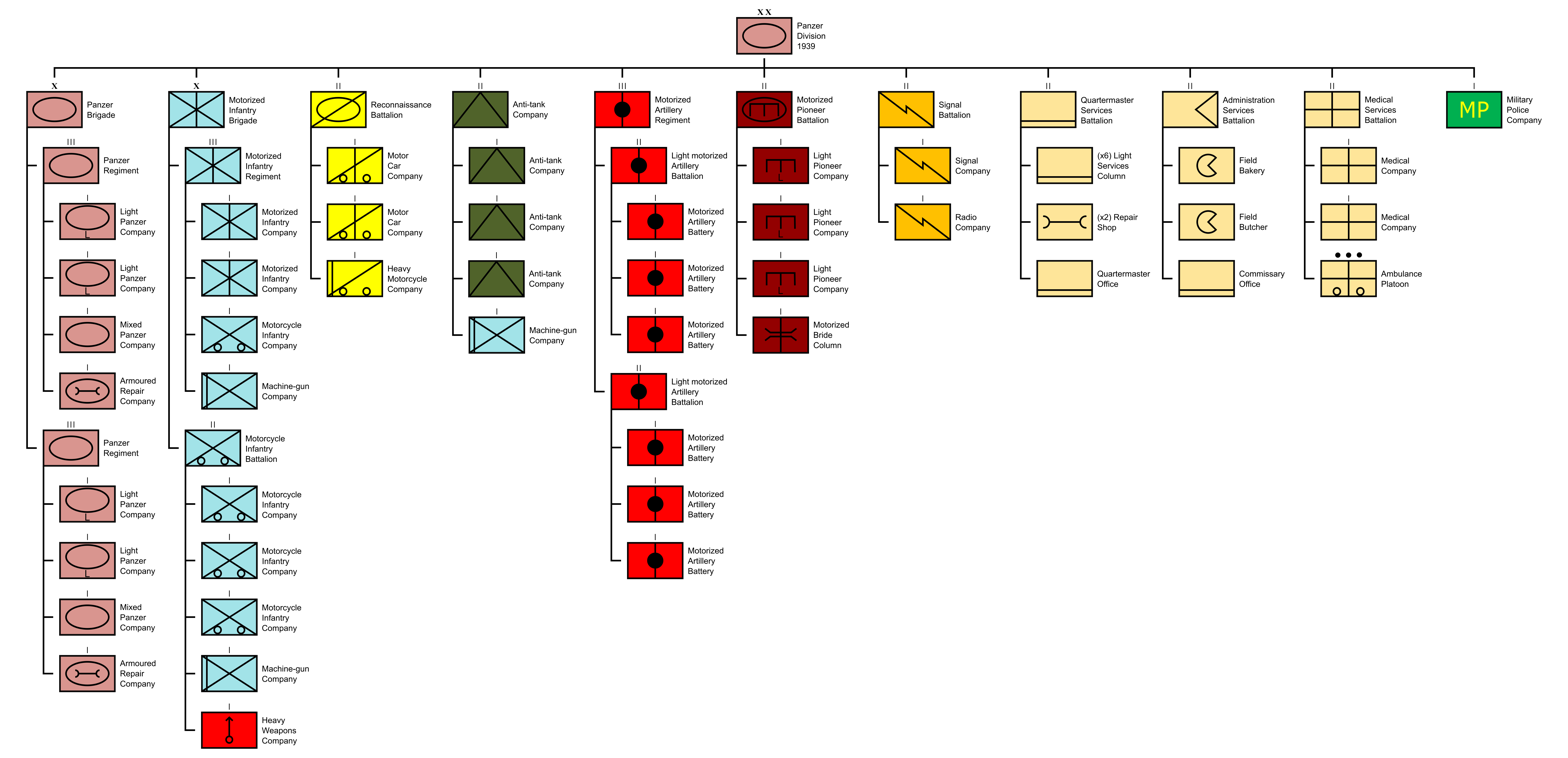
German Panzerdivision, 1939.

These first panzer divisions (1st through 5th) were composed of two tank regiments, one motorised infantry regiment of two battalions each, and supporting troops. After the invasion of Poland in 1939, the old divisions were partially reorganised (adding a third battalion to some infantry regiments or alternatively adding a second regiment of two battalions). Around this time, the newly organised divisions (6th through 10th) diverged in organisation, each on average with one tank regiment, one separate tank battalion, one or two infantry regiments (three to four battalions per division).

By the start of Operation Barbarossa, the German invasion of the Soviet Union in 1941, the 21 panzer divisions had undergone further reorganisation to now consist of one tank regiment (of two or three battalions) and two motorised regiments (of two battalions each). Until the winter of 1941/42, the organic component of these divisions consisted of a motorised artillery regiment (of one heavy and two light battalions) and the following battalions: reconnaissance, motorcycle, anti-tank, pioneer, field replacement, and communications. The number of tanks in the 1941-style divisions was relatively small, compared to their predecessors' composition. All other units in these formations were fully motorised (trucks, half-tracks, specialized combat vehicles) to match the speed of the tanks.

During the winter of 1941/42, the divisions underwent another reorganisation, with a tank regiment comprising from one to three battalions, depending on location (generally three for Army Group South, one for Army Group Centre, other commands usually two battalions). Throughout 1942, the reconnaissance battalions were merged into the motorcycle battalions.

By the summer of 1943, the Luftwaffe and Waffen-SS also had panzer divisions. A renewed standardization of the tank regiments was attempted. Each was now supposed to consist of two battalions, one with Panzer IV and one with Panther (Panzer V). In reality, the organization continued to vary from division to division. The first infantry battalion of the first infantry regiment of each panzer division was now supposed to be fully mechanised (mounted on armoured half-tracks (Sd.Kfz. 251). The first battalion of the artillery regiment replaced its former towed light howitzers with a mix of heavy and light self-propelled artillery (the Hummel with a 15 cm sFH 18/1 L/30 gun and the standard 105mm howitzer-equipped Wespe). The anti-tank battalion now included assault guns, tank destroyers (Panzerjaeger/Jadgpanzer), and towed anti-tank guns. Generally, the mechanization of these divisions increased compared to their previous organization.

Since the Heer and the SS used their own ordinal systems, there were duplicate numbers (i.e. there was both a 9th Panzerdivision and a 9th SS-Panzerdivision).

=== Numbered Heer divisions ===
- 1st Panzer Division
- 2nd Panzer Division
- 3rd Panzer Division
- 4th Panzer Division
- 5th Panzer Division
- 6th Panzer Division (previously 1st Light Division)
- 7th Panzer Division (previously 2nd Light Division)
- 8th Panzer Division (previously 3rd Light Division)
- 9th Panzer Division (previously 4th Light Division)
- 10th Panzer Division
- 11th Panzer Division
- 12th Panzer Division
- 13th Panzer Division (previously 13th Infantry Division, 13th Motorized Infantry Division; later Panzer Division Feldherrnhalle 2)
- 14th Panzer Division (previously 4th Infantry Division)
- 15th Panzer Division (previously 33rd Infantry Division; later 15th Panzergrenadier Division)
- 16th Panzer Division (previously 16th Infantry Division)
- 17th Panzer Division (previously 27th Infantry Division)
- 18th Panzer Division (later 18th Artillery Division)
- 19th Panzer Division (previously 19th Infantry Division)
- 20th Panzer Division
- 21st Panzer Division (previously 5th Light Division)
- 22nd Panzer Division
- 23rd Panzer Division
- 24th Panzer Division (previously 1st Cavalry Division)
- 25th Panzer Division (previously armoured division "Norway".
- 26th Panzer Division (formerly 23rd Infantry Division)
- 27th Panzer Division
- 116th Panzer Division Windhund (previously 16th Infantry Division, 16th Motorized Infantry Division, and 16th Panzergrenadier Division)
- 155th Reserve Panzer Division (previously Division Nr. 155, Division Nr. 155 (motorized), Panzer Division Nr. 155)
- Panzer Division Nr. 178 (previously Division Nr. 178)
- 179th Reserve Panzer Division (previously Division Nr. 179, Division Nr. 179 (mot.), and Panzer Division Nr. 179)
- 232nd Panzer Division (previously Panzer Division Tatra, Panzer Training Division Tatra)
- 233rd Reserve Panzer Division (previously Division Nr. 233 (mot.), Panzergrenadier Division Nr. 233, and Panzer Division Nr. 233; later Panzer Division Clausewitz)
- 273rd Reserve Panzer Division

=== Named Heer divisions ===
- Panzer Division Clausewitz (previously Division Nr. 233 (motorized), Panzergrenadier Division Nr. 233, and Panzer Division Nr. 233, Reserve Panzer Division 233)
  - Döberitz, Schlesien, and Holstein are approximately synonymous with Clausewitz.
- Panzer Division Feldherrnhalle 1 (previously 60th Infantry Division, 60th Motorized Infantry Division, and Panzergrenadier Division Feldherrnhalle)
- Panzer Division Feldherrnhalle 2 (previously 13th Infantry Division, 13th Motorized Infantry Division, and 13th Panzer Division)
- Fallschirm-Panzer Division 1 Hermann Göring
- Panzer Division Jüterbog
- Panzer Division Kempf (part Heer, part Waffen-SS)
- Panzer Division Kurmark
- Panzer Lehr Division (sometimes identified as 130th Panzer-Lehr-Division)
- Panzer Division Müncheberg
- Panzer Division Tatra (later Panzer Training Division Tatra, 232nd Panzer Division)

== Tank complement ==
The tank strength of the panzer divisions varied throughout the war. The actual equipment of each division is difficult to determine due to battle losses, the formation of new units, reinforcements and captured enemy equipment. The following table gives the tank strength of every division on two dates when this was known.

Unit	Tanks on September 1, 1939 (Invasion of Poland)	Tanks on June 22, 1941 (Invasion of the USSR)
1st Panzer Division	309	145
2nd Panzer Division	322	N/A (Note: Did not participate in Operation Barbarossa, transport ships sunk while carrying the Division (1941).)
3rd Panzer Division	391	215
4th Panzer Division	341	166
5th Panzer Division	335	N/A (Note: Arrived on the Eastern Front after Operation Barbarossa)
10th Panzer Division	150	182
Panzer Division Kempf	164	N/A^{e}
1st Light Division / 6th Panzer Division	226	245 (Note: Renamed following the Polish Campaign)
2nd Light Division / 7th Panzer Division	85	265
3rd Light Division / 8th Panzer Division	80	212
4th Light Division / 9th Panzer Division	62	143
Panzer Regiment 25	225	N/A (Note: Merged into other Divisions following the Polish Campaign)
11th Panzer Division	not formed until after the Polish campaign	143
12th Panzer Division	not formed until after the Polish campaign	293
13th Panzer Division	not formed until after the Polish campaign	149
14th Panzer Division	not formed until after the Polish campaign	147
16th Panzer Division	not formed until after the Polish campaign	146
17th Panzer Division	not formed until after the Polish campaign	202
18th Panzer Division	not formed until after the Polish campaign	218
19th Panzer Division	not formed until after the Polish campaign	228
20th Panzer Division	not formed until after the Polish campaign	229

== Flags ==
Panzer divisions used pink military flags.

== See also ==
- British armoured formations of the Second World War
- Deep operation
- Maneuver warfare
- Mechanised corps (Soviet Union)
- SS Panzer Division order of battle
- US Armored Divisions
