= Battle of Rostov =

- Three battles of the Eastern Front of World War II around the city of Rostov-on-Don on the Sea of Azov are known as the Battle of Rostov:
  - In the Battle of Rostov (1941), the German 1st Panzer Army captured the city but was driven out by the Soviet 37th Army
  - In the Battle of Rostov (1942), the German 17th Army captured the city
  - In the Battle of Rostov (1943), the Soviet Union recaptured the city
- A skirmish in Rostov-on-Don also occurred during the Wagner Group mutiny during the Russian invasion of Ukraine.
