= Franz Bäke =

German officer and tank commander (1898–1978)

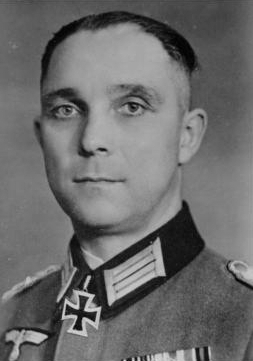
- Bäke in 1944
- Born: 28 February 1898; Province of Hesse-Nassau, German Empire
- Died: 12 December 1978 (aged 80); Bochum, West Germany
- Military career
- Allegiance: German Empire; Weimar Republic; Nazi Germany
- Branch: German Army
- Service years: 1915–1920; 1937–1945
- Rank: Generalmajor
- Units: 6th Panzer Division
- Commands: Panzer Division Feldherrnhalle 2
- Conflicts: World War I; Eastern Front; World War II; Invasion of Poland; Battle of France; Eastern Front
- Awards: Knight's Cross of the Iron Cross with Oak Leaves and Swords

Franz Bäke (28 February 1898 – 12 December 1978) was a German officer and tank commander during World War II. He was a recipient of the Knight's Cross of the Iron Cross with Oak Leaves and Swords of Nazi Germany. In post-war popular culture, Bäke was memorialised in the historical fiction series Panzer Aces by German author Franz Kurowski.

== Early career and World War I ==
Born in 1898, Bäke volunteered for the German Army in May 1915 and was posted to an infantry regiment. Fighting on the Western Front, Bäke earned the Iron Cross 2nd Class in 1916. Bäke was discharged from military service in January 1919. From 1919 to 1921, Bäke served in the Freikorps Epp, a right-wing paramilitary unit named after Franz Ritter von Epp. In parallel, he studied medicine and dentistry and attained degree of Doctor of Medical Dentistry in 1923.

On 1 March 1933, Bäke joined the SA; his final rank within the SA was SA-Standartenführer as of August 1944. Bäke established his own dentistry practice in Hagen. In 1937 he was accepted into the reserves and was posted to a reconnaissance unit. In 1938, he was mobilized for full-time service as an officer and took part in the occupation of Czechoslovakia.

== World War II ==
Bäke's unit took part in the invasion of Poland as part of the 1st Light Division, which was redesignated 6th Panzer Division in October 1939. With this unit, Bäke took part in the Battle of France and Operation Barbarossa. Following the encirclement of the German 6th Army at Stalingrad, the division took part in the abortive attempt to relieve the 6th Army in Operation Winter Storm in December 1942 and then retreated to Kharkiv. In January 1943, Bäke was awarded the Knight's Cross of the Iron Cross. During the Battle of Kursk (Operation Citadel) in July 1943, Bäke's unit fought near Belgorod, retreating to the Dniepr afterwards. For his actions during Operation Citadel, Bäke was awarded the Oak Leaves to the Knight's Cross.

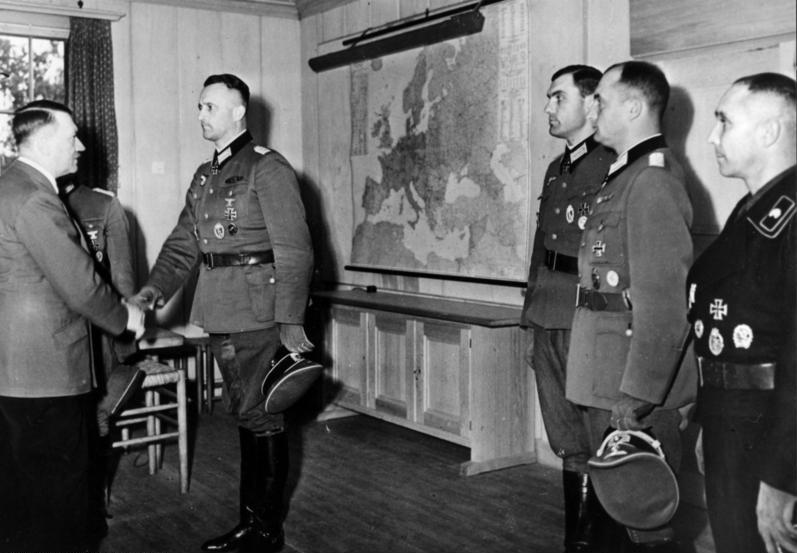
Adolf Hitler presents awards to Wehrmacht officers; Bäke is on the right

On 1 November 1943, Bäke was appointed as a regimental commander. In December 1943, he was ordered to form an ad hoc reinforced tank regiment named Heavy Panzer Regiment Bäke. The regiment consisted of 46 Panther and 34 Tiger I tanks, supported by self-propelled artillery and a mechanized engineer battalion. In January 1944, Bäke commanded his regiment during the battles for the Balabonovka pocket. Bäke single-handedly destroyed three Soviet tanks during the battle with infantry weapons at close range, for which he received three Tank Destruction Badges. Next, the regiment was part of a relief effort in support of Group Stemmermann, encircled in the Cherkassy Pocket. For his actions during these battles, Bäke received the Swords to the Knight's Cross on 21 February 1944. In March, the regiment fought in the Kamenets-Podolsky pocket.

In May 1944, Bäke was promoted to Oberst and later appointed commander of Panzer Brigade Feldherrnhalle. Bäke's unit attacked the U.S. 90th Infantry Division near Aumetz on the night of 7–8 September 1944. Bäke's command found itself poorly deployed and under sustained counter-attack from American infantry. By the evening of 8 September, Bäke had lost thirty tanks, sixty half-tracks, and nearly a hundred other vehicles in the lopsided battle. His infantry losses were also heavy, with the unit reporting to OB West that it had only nine armored vehicles and that unit strength was down to 25 per cent of the authorized establishment.

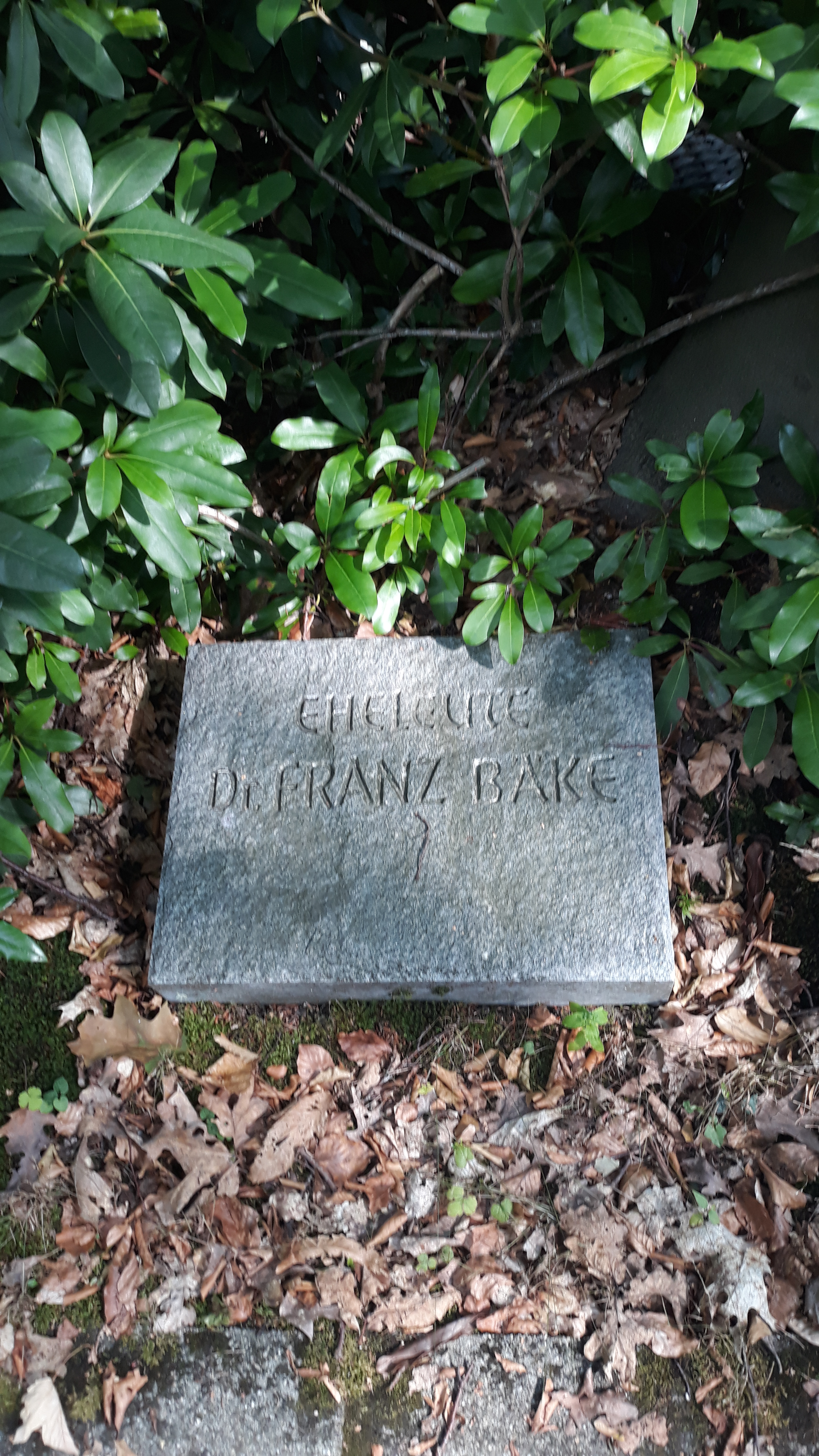
Grave in Hagen

On 28 February 1945, Bäke transferred from reserve to active duty. On 10 March he was appointed commander of Panzer Division Feldherrnhalle 2, formerly the 13th Panzer Division, and sent to Hungary. Bäke's division fought as part of the Panzer Corps Feldherrnhalle during the retreat through Hungary and Czechoslovakia. On 20 April, Bäke was promoted to Generalmajor and officially given command of the division. On 8 May 1945 he surrendered to American forces. Bäke was interned for two years; he was released in 1947. He returned to Hagen and resumed his dental practice. He died in 1978.

== In popular culture ==
Bäke is one of many highly decorated tank commanders popularised by the German author Franz Kurowski in his historical fiction book series Panzer Aces, along with Kurt Knispel and Michael Wittmann. According to historians Ronald Smelser and Edward Davies, Kurowski is a "guru" among those who romanticise the German war effort on the Eastern Front. Smelser and Davies define gurus as "authors, [who] have picked up and disseminated the myths of the Wehrmacht in a wide variety of popular publications that romanticize the German struggle in Russia".

In Kurowski's retelling of the operation to relieve the Cherkassy Pocket, Bäke is able to establish a corridor to the trapped German forces, after fighting unit after unit of the Red Army. Kurowski writes: "when the Soviets launched their expected attack, they were wiped out by the exhausted Panzer soldiers". In another of Kurowski's accounts, while attempting to relieve the 6th Army encircled in Stalingrad, Bäke destroys 32 enemy tanks in a single engagement.

The historian Sönke Neitzel questions the number of "tank kills" attributed to various tank commanders. According to Neitzel, number of successes by highly decorated soldiers should be read with caution as it is rarely possible to determine reliably in the heat of the battle how many tanks were destroyed and by whom. Military historian Steven Zaloga uses the term "tank ace" in quotation marks in his 2015 work Armored Champion: The Top Tanks of World War II. Zaloga points out that most of the supposed panzer aces operated the Tiger I heavy tank on the Eastern Front; having advantages both in firepower and in armor, Tiger I was "nearly invulnerable in a frontal engagement" against any of the Soviet tanks of that time. A crew operating a Tiger could thus engage its opponents from a safe distance.

Zaloga also discusses the "romantic nonsense" of the popular perception of a tank versus tank engagement as an "armoured joust" – two opponents facing each other, – with the "more valiant or better-armed [one] the eventual victor". Most of the successful tank commanders were indeed "bushwahackers", having a battlefield advantage rather than a technical one. Zaloga concludes: "Most of the 'tank aces' of World War II were simply lucky enough to have an invulnerable tank with a powerful gun". (quotations marks in the original).

== Awards ==
- Iron Cross (1914) 2nd Class (15 July 1916)
- Honour Cross of the World War 1914/1918
- Clasp to the Iron Cross (1939) 2nd Class (26 September 1939)
- Iron Cross (1939) 1st Class (1 June 1940)
- Panzer Badge in Silver: four awards up to 4th Grade; in Special Grade (100)
- 3 Tank Destruction Badges for Individual Combatants (17 July 1943)
- Knight's Cross of the Iron Cross with Oak Leaves and Swords
  - Knight's Cross on 11 January 1943 as Major of the Reserves and commander of the II./Panzer-Regiment 11
  - Oak Leaves on 1 August 1943 as Major of the Reserves and commander of the II./Panzer-Regiment 11
  - Swords on 21 February 1944 as Oberstleutnant of the Reserves and commander of Panzer-Regiment 11

The 1st Army and 19th Army nominated Bäke for the Knight's Cross of the Iron Cross with Oak Leaves, Swords and Diamonds for his leadership of 106. Panzer-Brigade. The nomination was rejected by Heinrich Himmler in his role as commander-in-chief Army Group Oberrhein.

Military offices
Preceded by Generalmajor Gerhard Schmidhuber	Commander of 13th Panzer Division; 10 March - 8 May 1945	Succeeded by none
