= 279th Division =

279th Division may refer to:

- 279th Infantry Division, Wehrmacht, Germany
- 279th Rifle Division, Soviet Union

== See also ==
- List of military divisions by number
