= Walter Herold =

- Born: 10 August 1897
- Died: 28 November 1944 (aged 47); Bochnia, Poland
- Military career
- Allegiance: German Empire; Weimar Republic; Nazi Germany
- Branch: Army
- Service years: 1915–1944
- Rank: Generalmajor (posthumously)
- Commands: 10th Panzergrenadier Division
- Conflicts: World War II
- Awards: Knight's Cross of the Iron Cross

Walter Herold (10 August 1897 – 28 November 1944) was an officer in the Wehrmacht of Nazi Germany during World War II who commanded several divisions. He was a recipient of the Knight's Cross of the Iron Cross. Herold was killed on 28 November 1944 near Slupia (district) Bochnia, Poland. He was posthumously promoted to generalmajor.

== Awards and decorations ==
- Knight's Cross of the Iron Cross on 13 October 1941 as Oberstleutnant and commander of Artillerie-Regiment 10 (mot.)

Military offices
Preceded by Generalleutnant August Schmidt	Commander of 10th Panzergrenadier Division; 30 September 1944 – 28 November 1944	Succeeded by Oberst Alexander Vial
