= Klata (surname) =

Klata is a Polish surname. Notable people with the surname include:

- Henryk Klata (born 1942), Polish economist and politician
- Katarzyna Klata (born 1972), Polish archer
- Wojciech Klata (born 1976), Polish actor
