= Panzer Division Feldherrnhalle 2 =

- Active: 09 March 1945 - 08 May 1945
- Country: Nazi Germany
- Branch: Army
- Type: Panzer
- Role: Armoured warfare
- Size: Division

Commanders
- Notable commanders: Generalmajor Franz Bäke

Panzer Division Feldherrnhalle 2 was a late World War II German Wehrmacht panzer division. Commanded by Franz Bäke, it was formed in March 1945 of the remnants of other divisions and stationed with a home base at Wehrkreis XX. It was moved to Slovakia in 1945, where it fought its only battles (Slovakia and the upper Danube). It was later disbanded.

== History ==
The Panzer Division Feldherrnhalle 2 was formed in March 1945 as successor to the 13th Panzer Division, from the Replacement and Training Brigade Feldherrnhalle, which had been forced out of Danzig early that year. The new division was sent to join the 8th Army, which was located in Slovakia at the time. In April 1945 the division fought its only battles, in Slovakia and on the upper Danube.

On 8 May 1945, the division was given the order to surrender. Major General Butler, commander of an American unit, was contacted about accepting the surrender of the division. The Americans desired to hand the German troops over to the Soviets in the area, however the Germans fooled Butler by taking him to see a HQ which the Germans placed forward of their main lines. This allowed the German unit to move into the captivity of the Americans as they headed in the opposite direction.

== Units ==
- Panzer Regiment Feldherrnhalle 2
- Panzer Grenadier Regiment Feldherrnhalle 2
- Panzer Artillery Regiment Feldherrnhalle 2
- 13th Panzer Reconnaissance Battalion
- Panzerjager Battalion Feldherrnhalle 2
- Motorized Engineer Battalion Feldherrnhalle 2
- Motorized Signal Battalion Feldherrnhalle 2
- Army Flak Artillery Battalion Feldherrnhalle

== Commander ==
- Generalmajor Franz Bäke - 9 March 1945 - 8 May 1945

== See also ==
- Panzer Corps Feldherrnhalle

== Sources ==
- Mitcham, Samuel W. (2006). The Panzer Legions: A Guide to the German Army Tank Divisions of World War II and Their Commanders. Mechanicsburg, Pennsylvania: Stackpole Books. ISBN 0-811733-53-X.
