= Stanisławów, Przysucha County =

Stanisławów
- Village
- Location within Poland
- Coordinates: 51°32′53″N 20°28′03″E
- Country: Poland
- Voivodeship: Masovian
- County: Przysucha
- Gmina: Odrzywół

Stanisławów [staniˈswavuf] is a village in the administrative district of Gmina Odrzywół, within Przysucha County, Masovian Voivodeship, in east-central Poland. The village administration is taken care of by the officially appointed Zbiegniew Kwasniak
