= Panzer Division Jüterbog =

German Panzer Division Jüterbog
- Active: February 1945 – March 1945
- Country: Nazi Germany
- Branch: Army
- Type: Panzer
- Role: Armoured warfare
- Size: Division
- Engagements: World War II

The Panzer Division Jüterbog was an armoured division of the Wehrmacht during World War II. Created on 20 February 1945, it was active for a short period of time.

== History ==
The division was created on 20 February 1945 at the Jüterbog training area. On 26 February 1945 it was ordered to head to the city of Bautzen to give its elements to the 16th Panzer Division which at that time was no more than a Kampfgruppe (‘’Battle Group’’). At the beginning of March 1945 the Jüterbog Division was dissolved.

=== Order of battle ===
At creation

- Divisionsstab
- Panzer-Abteilung "Jüterbog" (armored detachment)
  - Three companies equipped with Panzer IVs
  - Panzerjäger-Kompanie (Sfl.) (tank destroyer company)
- Two regiments of Panzergrenadiers
  - 2 battalions of 3 companies each
- Panzer-Aufklärungs-Abteilung "Jüterbog" (armored reconnaissance detachment)
  - Staff and two 2 Aufklärungs-Kompanien (reconnaissance companies)
- Panzer-Artillerie-Regiment "Jüterbog" (armored artillery regiment)
  - 1 battery of heavy flak (Sfl.)
  - 1 battery of light artillery (leFH mot, leichte Feldhaubitze)
  - 1 battery of heavy artillery (sFH mot, schwere Feldhaubitze)
- Panzer-Pionier-Abteilung"Jüterbog" (armored engineer detachment)
  - 2 companies of motorized engineers
- Signals company, repair company and medical company

By 26 February 1945

- Divisionsstab with Divisions-Begleit-Kompanie
- Panzer-Abteilung Jüterbog
  - 1.-4. Kompanie (31 StuG III, 10 Panzer IV/70)
- Panzer-Grenadier-Regiment Jüterbog
  - I. Bataillon (gep., mechanized)
    - 1.-4. Kompanie
  - II. Bataillon (mot., motorized)
    - 5.-8. Kompanie
  - 9. Kompanie (sIG, heavy infantry gun)
  - 10. Kompanie (Pionier, engineers)
  - 11. Kompanie (Flak, anti-aircraft)
- Panzer-Artillerie-Abteilung Jüterbog
  - 1. Batterie (leFH, light artillery)
  - 2. Batterie (leFH)
- Panzer-Aufklärungs-Kompanie Jüterbog (6 schwere PSW, 5 leichte PSW, planned; 6 heavy and 5 light reconnaissance vehicles (Panzerspähwagen))
- Panzerjäger-Kompanie Jüterbog (10 Jagdpanzer 38 "Hetzer", planned; 10 Hetzer tank destroyers)
- Panzer-Nachrichten-Kompanie Jüterbog (armored signal company)
- Support units: medical company with ambulances, 120 t heavy lift company, motorized repair company, administrative company, field post office
