= Kurt Cuno =

German general (1896–1961)

- Born: 27 August 1896; Zweibrücken, German Empire
- Died: 14 July 1961 (aged 64); Munich, West Germany
- Military career
- Allegiance: German Empire; Weimar Republic; Nazi Germany
- Branch: Army
- Rank: Generalleutnant
- Commands: 233d Reserve Panzer Division
- Conflicts: World War II
- Awards: Knight's Cross of the Iron Cross

Kurt Cuno (27 August 1896 – 14 July 1961) was a German general in the Wehrmacht during World War II who commanded the 233d Reserve Panzer Division. He was a recipient of the Knight's Cross of the Iron Cross of Nazi Germany.

== Awards and decorations ==
- Iron Cross (1914) 2nd Class (27 May 1916) & 1st Class (20 August 1916)
- Wound Badge in Black (30 June 1918) & in Silver (19 March 1942)
- Clasp to the Iron Cross (1939) 2nd Class (1 July 1941) & 1st Class (10 July 1941)
- Panzer Badge in Silver (18 August 1941)
- Eastern Front Medal (25 August 1942)
- German Cross in Gold on 14 January 1942 as Oberst with Panzer-Regiment 39
- Knight's Cross of the Iron Cross on 18 January 1942 as Oberst and commander of Panzer-Regiment 39
