= Wandzinów =

- Village
- Location within Poland
- Coordinates: 51°32′17″N 20°29′17″E
- Country: Poland
- Voivodeship: Masovian
- County: Przysucha
- Gmina: Odrzywół
- Population: 90

Wandzinów [vanˈd͡ʑinuf] is a village in the administrative district of Gmina Odrzywół, within Przysucha County, Masovian Voivodeship, in east-central Poland.
