= 547th Volksgrenadier Division =

German Army unit in World War II

The 547th Volksgrenadier Division (German: 547. Volksgrenadier-Division) was a Volksgrenadier infantry division of the German Army during World War II, active from 1944 to 1945.

== History ==
=== 547th Grenadier Division ===
The division was created as the 547th Grenadier Division in Military District V (Stuttgart) as a so-called Sperrdivision ("blocking division") belonging to the 29th Aufstellungswelle ("Wave of formations"). It was scheduled to be formed on 11 July 1944, however, its actual formation took place on 27 July 1944. From August 1944, the division served with the 4th Army under Army Group Centre and fought in Lithuania.

On 9 October 1944, the 547th Grenadier Division was redesignated as the 547th Volksgrenadier Division. The reorganization was intended to bring the unit up to the standard of a division belonging to the 32nd wave of formations.

=== 547th Volksgrenadier Division ===
The 547th Volksgrenadier Division continued fighting under the 4th Army in Lithuania and, during the following month, retreated with the 4th Army to East Prussia, remaining there until January 1945. The unit was destroyed near Zinten in February 1945. The remnants of the division were distributed among other divisions. The infantry elements were transferred to the 170th Infantry Division.

=== Second formation ===
The division was reconstituted starting in March 1945 and placed under the operational control of the 2nd Army (Army Group Vistula) in West Prussia. On 10 March 1945, the division was reformed near Schwedt with only two regiments. The "Shadow Division Hannover" was utilized for this purpose. Grenadier Regiment 1093 was not re-established, and the artillery regiment consisted of only a single battalion. Subsequently, the division was assigned to the 3rd Panzer Army and deployed on the Oder front against the Red Army.
In May 1945, the 547th Volksgrenadier Division surrendered to US forces near Schwerin in Mecklenburg.

== Commanders ==
- Major General Ernst Meiners (July 1944 - February 1945) (WIA)
- SS-Standartenführer Hans Kempin (February - March 1945)
- Major General Erich Fronhöfer (April - May 1945)

== Sources ==
- Samuel W. Mitcham (2007). German Order of Battle. Volume Two: 291st–999th Infantry Divisions, Named Infantry Divisions, and Special Divisions in WWII. Stackpole Books. ISBN 978-0-8117-3437-0, p. 148–149.
- Georg Tessin: Verbände und Truppen der deutschen Wehrmacht und Waffen-SS im Zweiten Weltkrieg 1939–1945. Volume 11. Die Landstreitkräfte 501–630. Biblio-Verlag, Bissendorf 1975, ISBN 3-7648-1181-1, p. 128.
