= Erich Fronhöfer =

German Nazi general (1895–1970)

- Born: 27 December 1895
- Died: 12 January 1970 (aged 74)
- Military career
- Allegiance: Nazi Germany
- Branch: Army
- Rank: Generalmajor
- Conflicts: World War II
- Awards: Knight's Cross of the Iron Cross

Erich Fronhöfer (27 December 1895, Ragaischen – 12 January 1970) was a German general in the Wehrmacht of Nazi Germany during World War II.

== Biography ==
Erich Fronhöfer fought in World War I as a Lieutenant. After the war, he was accepted into the Reichswehr and was promoted to Lieutenant Colonel ("Oberstleutnant") on 1 January 1939. On 10 August 1940, he was appointed commander of Panzer Regiment 10, which he commanded during the Balkan Campaign and later in Northern Russia during Operation Barbarossa. Due to illness, he was transferred to the Führerreserve on 25 February 1942, and sent back to the Reich to recuperate.

Between 1 and 24 November 1943, he was entrusted with the command of the 20th Luftwaffe Field Division. He was promoted to Major General on 1 August 1944 and on 8 September, he was entrusted with the acting command of the 114th Jäger Division. On 15 September 1944, he was again appointed Commander of the 20th Luftwaffe Assault Division.

On 1 April 1945, he became Commander of the 547th Volksgrenadier Division with which he was taken prisoner by the British on 4 May 1945. He was released from captivity on 18 May 1948.

== Awards and decorations ==
- Knight's Cross of the Iron Cross on 24 July 1941 as Oberstleutnant and commander of Panzer-Regiment 10

Military offices
Preceded by Generalmajor Robert Fuchs	Commander of 20th Luftwaffe Field Division; 1 November 1943 – 24 November 1943	Succeeded by Generalmajor Wilhelm Crisolli
Preceded by Generalmajor Hans-Joachim Ehlert	Commander of 114th Jäger Division; 8 September 1944 – 15 September 1944	Succeeded by Generalmajor Hans-Joachim Ehlert
Preceded by Generalmajor Wilhelm Crisolli	Commander of 20th Luftwaffe Assault Division; 15 September 1944 – 11 December 1944	Succeeded by None
Preceded by SS-Standartenführer Hans Kempin	Commander of 547. Volksgrenadier-Division; 1 April 1945 – May 1945	Succeeded by None
