= Karl-Richard Koßmann =

- Born: 28 March 1899
- Died: 10 June 1969 (aged 70)
- Military career
- Allegiance: Nazi Germany
- Branch: Army (Wehrmacht)
- Rank: Generalmajor
- Commands: 10th Panzergrenadier Division
- Conflicts: World War II
- Awards: Knight's Cross of the Iron Cross

Karl-Richard Koßmann (26 June 1896 – 10 June 1969) was a German general during World War II. He was a recipient of the Knight's Cross of the Iron Cross.

== Awards and decorations ==
- Knight's Cross of the Iron Cross on 23 March 1945 as Oberst and commander of 74th Panzergrenadier Regiment

Military offices
Preceded by Oberst Alexander Vial	Commander of 10th Panzergrenadier Division; January 1945 – 8 May 1945	Succeeded by None
