= Ceteń =

- Village
- Location within Poland
- Coordinates: 51°30′51″N 20°17′46″E
- Country: Poland
- Voivodeship: Masovian
- County: Przysucha
- Gmina: Odrzywół

Ceteń [ˈt͡sɛtɛɲ] is a village in the administrative district of Gmina Odrzywół, within Przysucha County, Masovian Voivodeship, in east-central Poland.
