= Dąbrowa, Przysucha County =

Dąbrowa
- Village
- Location within Poland
- Coordinates: 51°34′50″N 20°26′52″E
- Country: Poland
- Voivodeship: Masovian
- County: Przysucha
- Gmina: Odrzywół

Dąbrowa [dɔmˈbrɔva] is a village in the administrative district of Gmina Odrzywół, within Przysucha County, Masovian Voivodeship, in east-central Poland.
