= Gmina Odrzywół =

Gmina Odrzywół Odrzywół Commune
- Gmina
- Coat of arms
- Interactive map of Gmina Odrzywół
- Coordinates (Odrzywół): 51°31′9″N 20°33′15″E
- Country: Poland
- Voivodeship: Masovian
- County: Przysucha
- Seat: Odrzywół

Area
  - Total: 94.83 km^{2} (36.61 sq mi)

Population (2006)
  - Total: 4,185
  - Density: 44.13/km^{2} (114.3/sq mi)
- Website: http://www.odrzywol.ug.gov.pl

Gmina Odrzywół is a rural gmina (administrative district) in Przysucha County, Masovian Voivodeship, in east-central Poland. Its seat is the village of Odrzywół, which lies approximately 18 kilometres (11 mi) north of Przysucha and 84 km (52 mi) south of Warsaw.

The gmina covers an area of 94.83 square kilometres (36.6 sq mi), and as of 2006 its total population is 4,185.

== Villages ==
Gmina Odrzywół contains the villages and settlements of Ceteń, Dąbrowa, Jelonek, Kamienna Wola, Kłonna, Kolonia Ossa, Łęgonice Małe, Lipiny, Myślakowice, Myślakowice-Kolonia, Odrzywół, Ossa, Różanna, Stanisławów, Wandzinów and Wysokin.

== Neighbouring gminas ==
Gmina Odrzywół is bordered by the gminas of Drzewica, Klwów, Nowe Miasto nad Pilicą, Poświętne, Rusinów and Rzeczyca.
