= Friedrich-Wilhelm von Rothkirch und Panthen =

- Born: 16 February 1884
- Died: 24 December 1953 (aged 69)
- Military career
- Allegiance: Nazi Germany
- Branch: Army (Wehrmacht)
- Service years: 1902–1943
- Rank: Generalleutnant
- Commands: 13th Panzer Division; 148th Reserve Division
- Conflicts: World War II
- Awards: Knight's Cross of the Iron Cross

Friedrich-Wilhelm von Rothkirch und Panthen (16 February 1884 – 24 December 1953) was a German general during World War II. He was a recipient of the Knight's Cross of the Iron Cross of Nazi Germany. Rothkirch und Panthen retired from active duty on 30 November 1943.

== Awards ==
- Knight's Cross of the Iron Cross on 15 August 1940 as Generalmajor and commander of the 13th Motorized Infantry Division (13. Infanterie-Division (motorisiert))

Military offices
Preceded by Generalleutnant Paul Otto	Commander of 13. Infanterie-Division (mot.); 1 November 1939 – 11 October 1940	Succeeded by Renamed 13. Panzer-Division
Preceded by Previously 13. Infanterie-Division (mot.)	Commander of 13. Panzer-Division; 11 October 1940 – 27 June 1941	Succeeded by Generalmajor Walter Düvert
Preceded by Generalleutnant Hermann Böttcher	Commander of 148. Reserve-Division; 1 April 1943 – 25 September 1943	Succeeded by Generalmajor Otto Fretter-Pico
