= Myślakowice-Kolonia =

Village in Gmina Odrzywół, Poland

- Village
- Location within Poland
- Coordinates: 51°36′24″N 20°26′14″E
- Country: Poland
- Voivodeship: Masovian
- County: Przysucha
- Gmina: Odrzywół

Myślakowice-Kolonia [mɨɕlakɔˈvit͡sɛ kɔˈlɔɲa] is a village in the administrative district of Gmina Odrzywół, within Przysucha County, Masovian Voivodeship, in east-central Poland.
