= Jelonek, Przysucha County =

Jelonek
- Village
- Location within Poland
- Coordinates: 51°30′N 20°35′E
- Country: Poland
- Voivodeship: Masovian
- County: Przysucha
- Gmina: Odrzywół

Jelonek [jɛˈlɔnɛk] is a village in the administrative district of Gmina Odrzywół, within Przysucha County, Masovian Voivodeship, in east-central Poland.
