= 15th Panzergrenadier Division =

- German: 15. Panzergrenadier-Division
- 15th Panzergrenadier Division, 1943–1945
- Active: July 1943 – 8 May 1945
- Country: Nazi Germany
- Branch: Army
- Type: Panzergrenadier
- Role: Armoured warfare Maneuver warfare Raiding
- Size: Division
- Engagements: World War II: Sicily; Salerno; Cassino; Anzio; Battle of the Bulge

Commanders
- Notable commanders: Ernst-Günther Baade

15th Panzergrenadier Division was a mobile division of the German Army in World War II.

== Combat History ==
=== Sicily ===
In July 1943 a new 15th Panzergrenadier Division, commanded by Generalleutnant Eberhard Rodt, was formed by redesignating the Division Sizilien and incorporating personnel awaiting assignment to 15th Panzer Division, which had surrendered, along with the rest of Panzerarmee Afrika on 13th May, 1943.

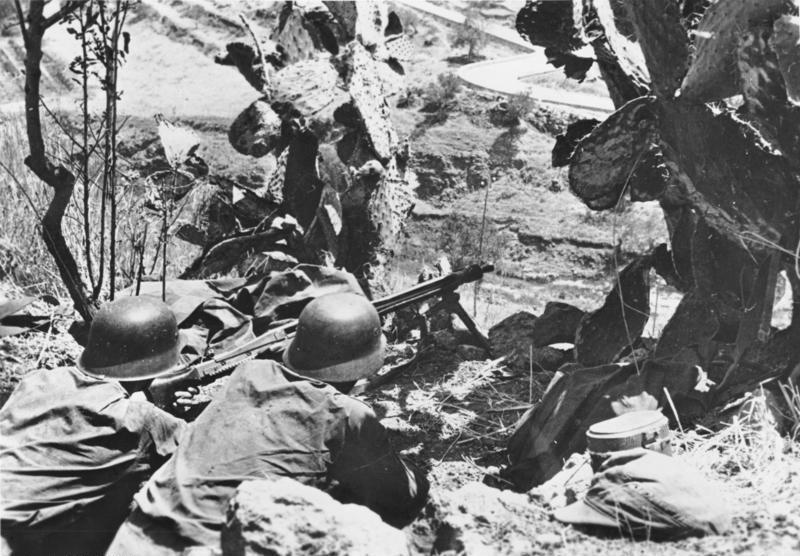
Machine gun position in Sicily.

On 10th July, of the same year the Allies executed Operation Husky), landings on Sicily's southern coast during which the division, like the Luftwaffe's Panzer Division Hermann Goring fought a series of delaying actions that included clashes with 1st Canadian Infantry Division at Piazza Armerina, Leonforte, Assoro and Valguarnera prior to defending the hilltop town of Troina along Highway 120 where 15th Panzergrenadier suffered heavy losses battling US 1st Infantry Division, nicknamed "The Big Red One", commanded by Major General Terry Allen from August 1–6 during which 15th Panzergrenadier suffered heavy losses. Like the rest of the Axis forces on the island, the division was evacuated, via the port at Messina to the Italian mainland, in August.

=== Italy ===
By August 17, 1943, the 15th Panzergrenadier along with the 29th Infantry, the 1st Parachute and the Hermann Göring Divisions would escape across the Strait of Messina to the mainland and participate in the Italian Campaign. Beginning on September 9, 1943, the Allied invasion of mainland Italy, (code-named Operation Avalanche), at Salerno and along the beaches to the southeast, found the 15th Panzergrenadiers among the principal defenders. On September 11, elements of the British 46th Infantry Division encountered stiff resistance from the 15th Panzergrenadier and Hermann Göring Divisions around Salerno itself and to the east.

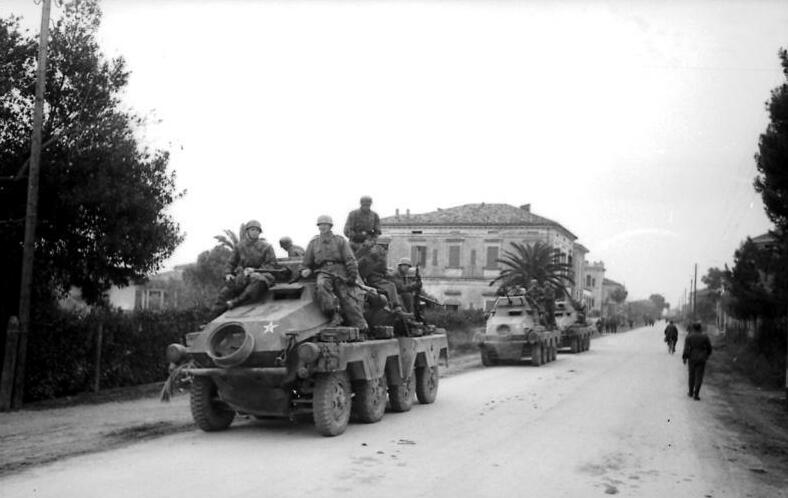
Reconnaissance unit from 15th Panzer Grenadier Division travels through Italian town.

By mid-November 1943, the 15th Panzergrenadier Division had fallen back to help defend the Bernhardt Line in the vicinity of Mignano along Highway 6. On December 7, 1943, two battalions of the 15th Panzergrenadier, commanded by Captain Helmut Meitzel, held strong defensive positions in the town of San Pietro Infine and on the vitally important and strategic Monte Lungo to the southwest. Elements of the 71st Infantry Division, held the German left flank on the heights of Monte Sammucro to the north, while the 29th Panzergrenadier Division held the rear near the town of San Vittore, two miles to the northwest. The 36th Infantry Division, commanded by Major General Fred L. Walker, launched flanking attacks on their right, while the 1st Italian Motorized Group attacked the left up Monte Lungo. The Battle of San Pietro Infine ensued. After ten days of intense attack and counter-attack, the Allies finally succeeded in gaining the high ground on both flanks. With the advantage lost, the 15th Panzergrenadier and its supporting units fell back to defensive positions in the vicinity of San Vittore in the early hours of December 17; they would hold these positions for the next three weeks.

Between January 20 and 22 1944, two battalions of the 15th Panzergrenadiers repulsed an ill-conceived assault by the US 36th Infantry Division, when the Allies were attempting to establish a bridgehead in the vicinity of the town of Sant' Angelo, to launch attacks on the Gustav Line near Monte Cassino.

On May 11, 1944, the Allies launched Operation Diadem which finally resulted in the collapse of the Gustav Line and the capitulation of the German defences along the Winter Line. From May 15–19, the 15th Panzergrenadiers fought a retreating battle through the Aurunci Mountains against the 3rd Algerian Infantry and 4th Moroccan Mountain Divisions of the French Expeditionary Corps, commanded by General Alphonse Juin.

=== North-west Europe ===
The 15th Panzergrenadiers fought the rest of the war on the Western Front. It fought in the Battle of the Bulge, where it participated in the Siege of Bastogne and in Operation Blockbuster, serving under the First Parachute Army. It surrendered to the British at war's end.

== Order of battle (1944) ==
- 104. Panzergrenadier Regiment (motorized infantry)
- 115. Panzergrenadier Regiment (motorized infantry)
- 33. Artillery Regiment (motorized)
- 115. Panzer Battalion
- 33. Panzerjäger Battalion
- 115. Panzer Aufklärung Battalion
- 33. Pioneer Battalion (motorized)
- 315. Heer Flak Battalion (motorized)
- Signal, Supply and Support Units

== Commanders ==
Date	Commander
July 1, 1943	Generalleutnant Eberhard Rodt
October 1943	Generalleutnant Ernst-Günther Baade
November 20, 1943	Generalleutnant Eberhard Rodt
September 5, 1944	Oberst (Colonel) Karl-Theodor Simon
October 9, 1944	Generalmajor Hans-Joachim Deckert
January 28, 1945	Oberst Wolfgang Maucke

== War crimes ==
The division has been implicated in the Bellona massacre, Campania, carried out between 6 and 7 October 1943, when 54 civilians were executed.
