= Ossa, Masovian Voivodeship =

Ossa
- Village
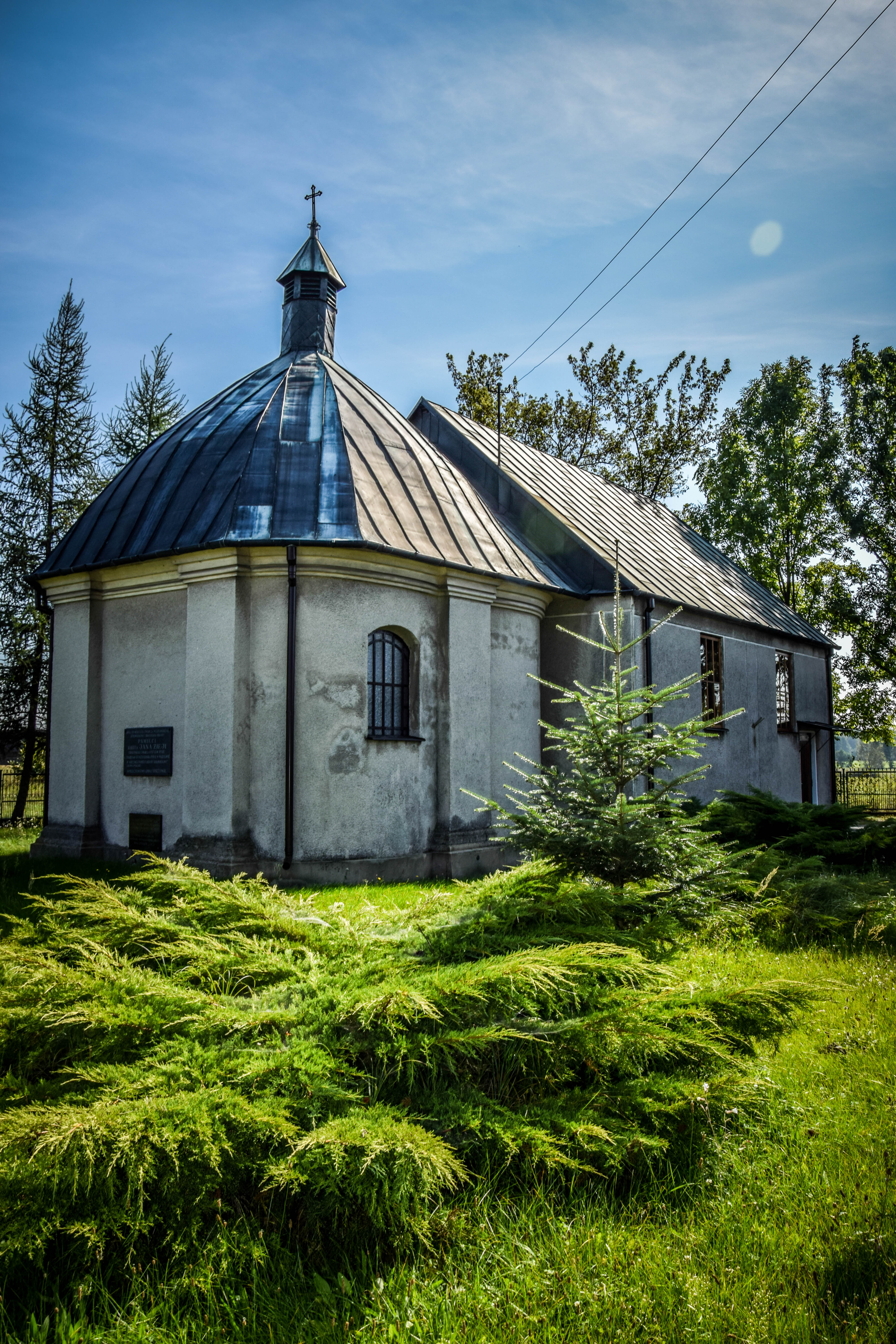
- Chapel of Saint Theresa

- Location within Poland
- Coordinates: 51°31′N 20°29′E
- Country: Poland
- Voivodeship: Masovian
- County: Przysucha
- Gmina: Odrzywół
- Time zone: UTC+1 (CET)
  - Summer (DST): UTC+2 (CEST)
- Vehicle registration: WPY

Ossa [ˈɔssa] is a village in the administrative district of Gmina Odrzywół, within Przysucha County, Masovian Voivodeship, in east-central Poland.

During the January Uprising, on July 10, 1863, it was the site of the Battle of Ossa, in which Polish insurgents led by General Ludwik Żychliński defeated Russian troops.
