= 233rd =

233rd or 233d may refer to:

- 233d Aero Squadron, Re-designated as Squadron "E", July–November 1918
- 233rd (Northumbrian) Field Company, Royal Engineers, moved back into the Ypres Salient in December 1915
- 233rd Battalion (Canadiens-Français du Nord-Ouest), CEF, unit in the Canadian Expeditionary Force during the First World War
- 233rd Brigade, Royal Field Artillery, part-time unit of Britain's Royal Field Artillery created in 1908 as part of the Territorial Force
- 233rd Brigade (United Kingdom), infantry formation of the British Army in World War I and World War II
- 233rd pope (Pope Paul V) (1550–1621), born Camillo Borghese, was Pope from 16 May 1605 to his death in 1621
- 233rd Reserve Panzer Division (Wehrmacht), German panzer division during World War II which was mainly deployed in Denmark
- 233rd Street (IRT White Plains Road Line), local station on the IRT White Plains Road Line of the New York City Subway
- East 233rd Street (Bronx), major thoroughfare in the New York City borough of The Bronx
- East 233rd Street station or Woodlawn station (Metro-North), commuter rail stop on the Metro-North Railroad's Harlem Line

== See also ==
- 233 (number)
- 233, the year 233 (CCXXXIII) of the Julian calendar
- 233 BC
