= Lipiny, Przysucha County =

Lipiny
- Village
- Location within Poland
- Coordinates: 51°32′36″N 20°30′36″E
- Country: Poland
- Voivodeship: Masovian
- County: Przysucha
- Gmina: Odrzywół

Lipiny [liˈpinɨ] is a village in the administrative district of Gmina Odrzywół, within Przysucha County, Masovian Voivodeship, in east-central Poland.
