= Henryk Klata =

Polish economist and politician

Member of the First Term of the Sejm
- In office 25 November 1991 – 31 May 1993

Personal details
- Born: 7 November 1942 (age 83) Kolonia Ossa
- Party: Zjednoczenie Chrześcijańsko-Narodowe

Henryk Klata (born 7 November 1942 in the village Kolonia Ossa) is a Polish economist, politician and member of the first term of the Polish Parliament.

== History ==
During the years of Polish People's Republic, Klata was a member of the National Democratic League, one of the first opposition organisations. On 7 May 1960, he was arrested along with other young individuals, and on 29 May 1961 he was sentenced to 10 months in prison. In 1978, he finished his studies in the Department of Planning and Statistics, Main School of Planning and Statistics in Warsaw. He worked as an economist and an accountant.

In 1991, he was elected to be a member of the First Term of the Polish Parliament (Sejm). He was chosen in the Ostroleka region from the list of the "Wyborcza Akcja Katolicka". He was a member of the Parliamentary Club of the Zjednoczenie Chrześcijańsko-Narodowe (Christian-National Party) and in 1992 their candidate for the position of President of the Supreme Audit Office. He sat on the Committee on Local Government and the Special Committee to consider laws, amending the Law on Co-Operatives, allowing privatisation of previously national or nationalised companies in the formerly communist country. He was also a member of seven sub-committees. He did not seek a second term in parliament. He was later a Director at the National Bank of Poland.

After leaving the parliament he was still associated with the government, he was a Councillor until 1998 of the Bielany district in Warsaw. Later he did not engage in politics. In 2010 he supported Marek Jurek as a candidate for the presidential elections in Poland and became part of his social support committee.

== Bibliography ==
- Strona sejmowa posła I kadencji. [Retrieved 6 April 2014].
