= Walter Düvert =

German general (1893–1972)

- Born: 2 October 1893
- Died: 4 February 1972 (aged 78)
- Military career
- Allegiance: German Empire; Weimar Republic; Nazi Germany
- Branch: German Army
- Service years: 1911–1944
- Rank: Generalleutnant
- Commands: 13th Panzer Division; 20th Panzer Division; 265th Infantry Division
- Conflicts: World War I; World War II; Battle of France; Operation Barbarossa; Battle of Uman; Battle of Kiev (1941); Battle of Rostov (1941); Battles of Rzhev; Operation Overlord
- Awards: Knight's Cross of the Iron Cross

Walter Düvert (2 October 1893 – 4 February 1972) was a general in the Wehrmacht of Nazi Germany during World War II. He was a recipient of the Knight's Cross of the Iron Cross. Düvert retired from active duty on 30 November 1944.

== Awards and decorations ==
- Knight's Cross of the Iron Cross on 30 July 1941 as Generalmajor and commander of 13th Panzer Division

Military offices
Preceded by Generalleutnant Friedrich-Wilhelm von Rothkirch und Panthen	Commander of 13th Panzer Division; 25 June 1941 – 30 November 1941	Succeeded by General der Panzertruppe Traugott Herr
Preceded by Generalmajor Wilhelm Ritter von Thoma	Commander of 20th Panzer Division; 1 July 1942 – 10 October 1942	Succeeded by Oberst Heinrich Freiherr von Lüttwitz
Preceded by None	Commander of 265th Infantry Division; 1 June 1943 – 28 July 1944	Succeeded by Generalleutnant Hans Junck
