= Odrzywół, Przysucha County =

Odrzywół
- Town
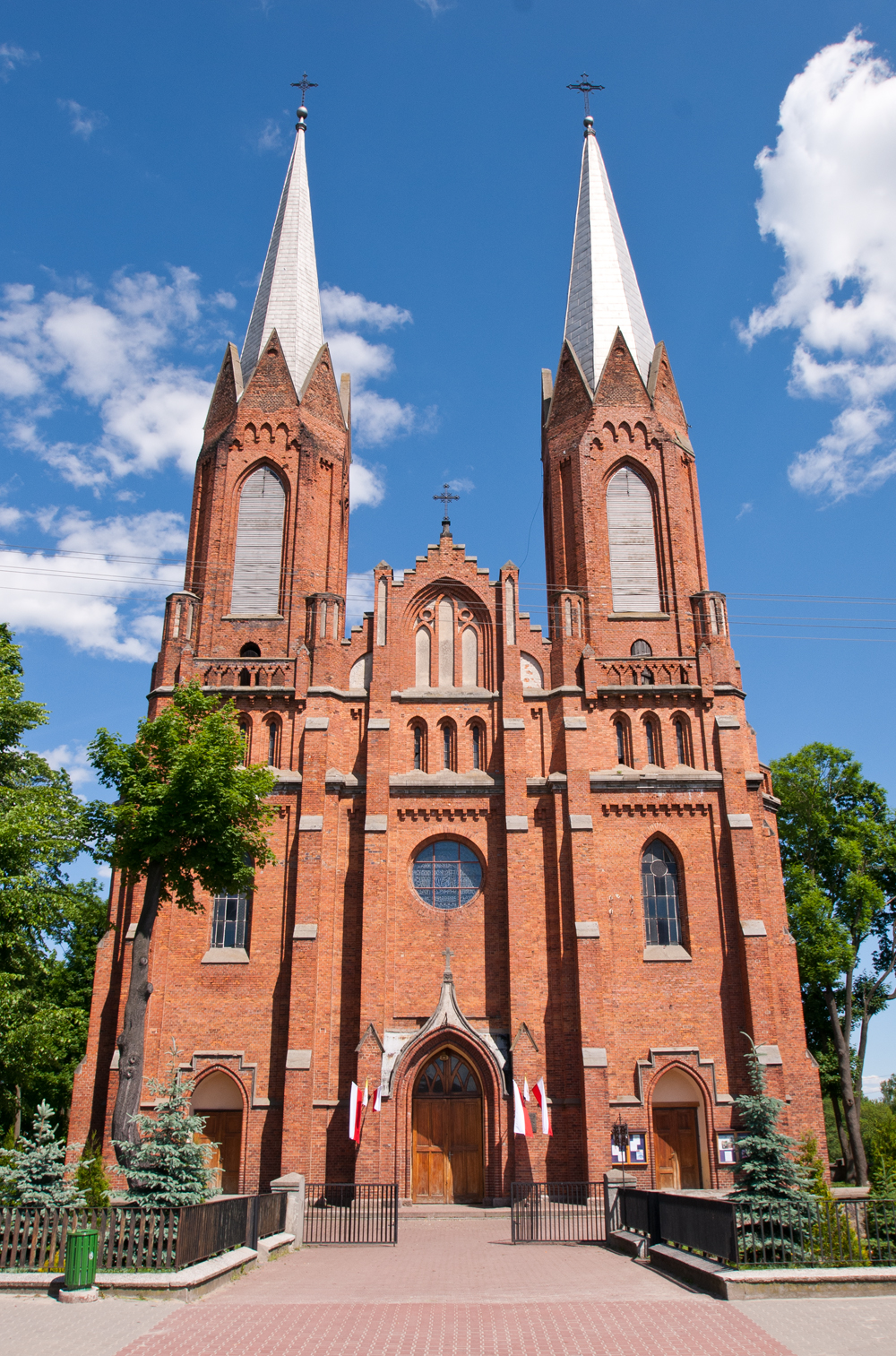
- Church of Saints Jadwiga and Stanislaus

- Coat of arms

- Location within Poland
- Coordinates: 51°31′N 20°33′E
- Country: Poland
- Voivodeship: Masovian
- County: Przysucha
- Gmina: Odrzywół
- Town rights: 1418

Population (approx.)
  - Total: 1,300
- Time zone: UTC+1 (CET)
  - Summer (DST): UTC+2 (CEST)
- Vehicle registration: WPY

Odrzywół [ɔˈdʐɨvuu̯] is a town in Przysucha County, Masovian Voivodeship, in east-central Poland. It is the seat of the gmina (administrative district) called Gmina Odrzywół.

== History ==
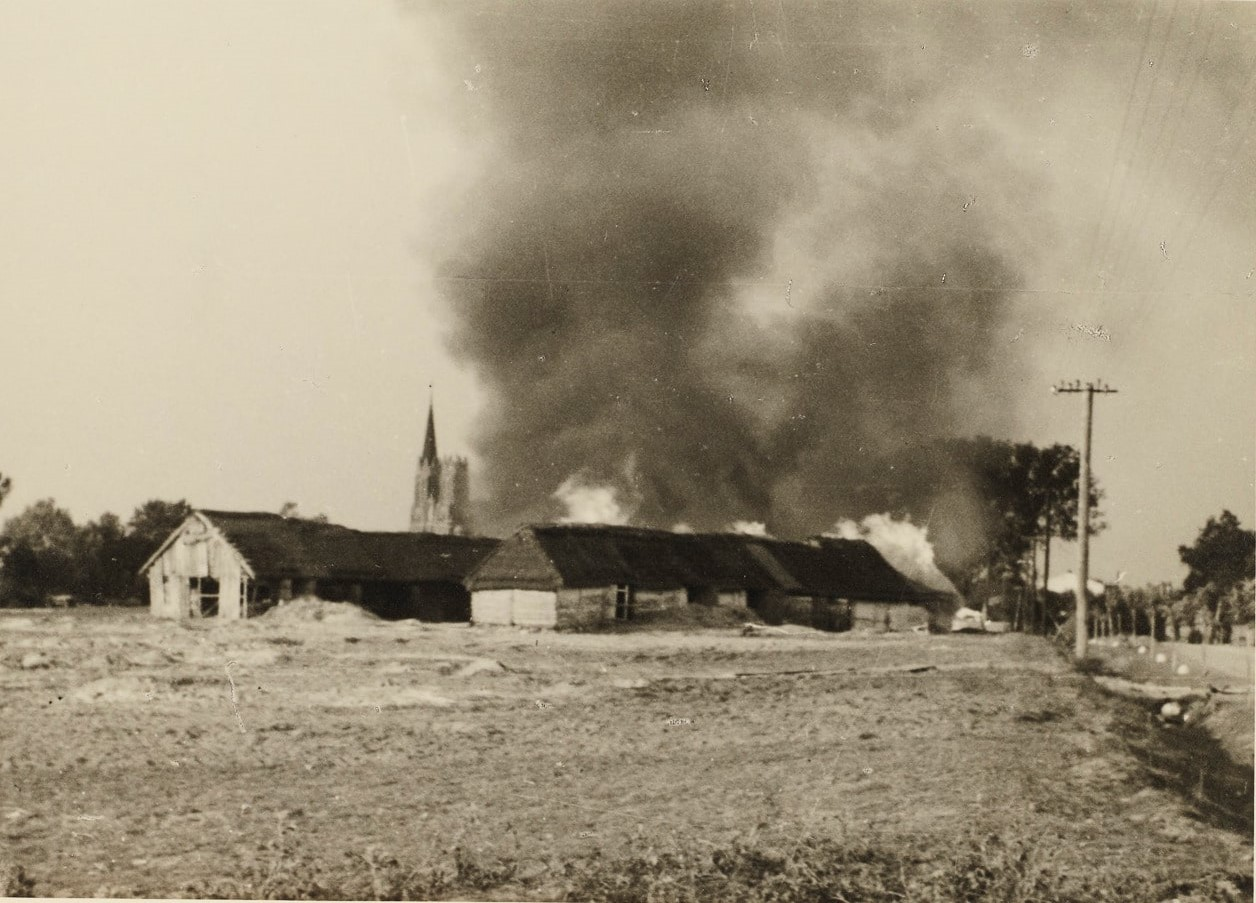
Burning buildings of Odrzywół during the German invasion of Poland in 1939

Odrzywół, initially known as Wysokin, received town charter in 1418, due to the efforts of the Starosta of Radom, Dobrogost Czarny Odrzywolski (Nałęcz coat of arms). King Władysław II Jagiełło permitted Odrzywolski to turn the village of Wysokin into a town because during the Polish–Lithuanian–Teutonic War, he had distinguished himself. In 1553, King Sigismund I the Old allowed to change the name of the town to the current Odrzywół. Odrzywół remained a small town, which until the Partitions of Poland belonged to the Sandomierz Voivodeship in the Lesser Poland Province. In 1781, a royal privilege confirmed old fairs and established seven new fairs.

In 1815 it became part of Russian-controlled Congress Poland, and was stripped of its town charter because of participation of residents in the January Uprising. After World War I, in 1918, Poland regained independence and control of the settlement. According to the 1921 census, the population was 78.1% Polish and 21.3% Jewish.

Following the German-Soviet invasion of Poland, which started World War II in September 1939, it was occupied by Germany. The local Polish police chief was murdered by the Russians in the Katyn massacre in 1940.

== Transport ==
Odrzywół is a road hub, with a junction of two roads (Końskie–Warsaw, and Łódź–Radom).

== Sights ==
The town has a late 18th-century rectory, where in April 1809 Prince Józef Poniatowski stayed. It also has a Neo-Gothic parish church, built in the early 20th century. In 1968, the church was visited by Cardinal Karol Wojtyła.
