= Ernst-Günther Baade =

German general

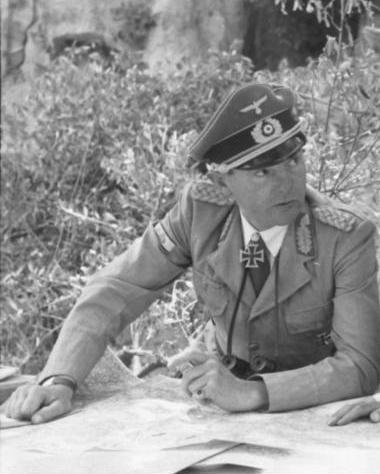
- Born: 20 August 1897; Falkenhagen, German Empire
- Died: 8 May 1945 (aged 47); Bad Segeberg, Nazi Germany
- Military career
- Allegiance: German Empire (to 1918); Weimar Republic (to 1933); Nazi Germany
- Branch: Army (Wehrmacht)
- Service years: 1914–1945
- Rank: Generalleutnant
- Commands: 90th Light Infantry Division
- Conflicts: World War I World War II (DOW)
- Awards: Knight's Cross of the Iron Cross with Oak Leaves and Swords

Ernst-Günther Baade (20 August 1897 – 8 May 1945) was a German army officer who fought in both world wars. He was a general during World War II, and was a recipient of the Knight's Cross of the Iron Cross with Oak Leaves and Swords of Nazi Germany. Baade was wounded in action and died from his injuries on 8 May 1945.

== Early career ==
Ernst-Günther Baade volunteered for military service in 1914 and fought during World War I as a Leutnant in the 9th Dragoon Regiment of the Royal Prussian Army. He was awarded both classes of the Iron Cross and the Wound Badge in black. He returned in the post-war Reichswehr and was a squadron leader in the 3rd Cavalry Regiment between 1934 and 1939.

== World War II ==
During World War II, in March 1942 Baade was assigned to the active reserve of officers (Führerreserve). He subsequently transferred to the 15th Panzer Division in North Africa and took command of the 115th Rifle Regiment on 15 April 1942, at that time committed to action in Libya and Cyrenaica. Baade became a legend in the Afrika Korps and was known to go into battle dressed in a Scottish kilt and carrying a claymore, a double-edged broadsword. In May 1942 he took part in the Battle of Bir Hakeim. Baade was awarded the Knight's Cross of the Iron Cross for his actions during the battle. He was wounded on 28 July 1942 at El-Alamein, and evacuated to Germany.

During the evacuation of German forces from Sicily to the Italian mainland in early August 1943, Baade was placed in charge of the force defending the Straits of Messina. Baade commanded the 90th Infantry Division in the Battle of Monte Cassino. He was known for his occasionally eccentric behavior, his very small staff, and his frequent front-line inspection visits, all of which made him popular with his troops. He was awarded a Tank Destruction Badge for the single-handed destruction of an enemy tank with an infantry weapon.

Baade was wounded on 24 April 1945, when his staff car was strafed by a British fighter aircraft near Neverstaven in Holstein. He died of gangrene in a hospital at Bad Segeberg on 8 May 1945.

== Awards and decorations ==
- Iron Cross (1914) 2nd Class (25 November 1916) & 1st Class (24 December 1917)
- Hanseatic Cross of Hamburg
- Wound Badge (1914) in Black (1 July 1918)
- Honour Cross of the World War 1914/1918
- Wehrmacht Long Service Award 2nd Class (2 October 1936)
- Clasp to the Iron Cross (1939) 2nd Class (18 September 1939) & 1st Class (5 June 1940)
- German Cross in Gold on 2 November 1941 as Oberstleutnant in the I./Reiter-Regiment 22
- Wound Badge (1939) in Silver
- Knight's Cross of the Iron Cross with Oak Leaves and Swords
  - Knight's Cross on 27 June 1942 as Oberst and commander of Schützen-Regiment 115
  - Oak Leaves on 22 February 1944 as Oberst and leader of the 90. Panzergrenadier-Division
  - Swords on 16 November 1944 as Generalleutnant and commander of the 90. Panzergrenadier-Division

== Footnotes and references ==
=== Bibliography ===
- Atkinson, Ricky (2007). The Day of Battle – The War in Sicily and Italy 1943–1944. London: Little, Brown. ISBN 978-0-316-72560-6.
- Hapgood, David; Richardson, David (1984). Monte Cassino. New York: Congdon & Weed. ISBN 0-86553-105-6.
- Mitcham, Samuel W. (2007). Rommel's Desert Commanders — The Men Who Served the Desert Fox, North Africa, 1941–42. Mechanicsburg, PA: Stackpole Books. ISBN 978-0-8117-3510-0.
- Patzwall, Klaus D.; Scherzer, Veit (2001). Das Deutsche Kreuz 1941 – 1945 Geschichte und Inhaber Band II [The German Cross 1941 – 1945 History and Recipients Volume 2] (in German). Norderstedt, Germany: Verlag Klaus D. Patzwall. ISBN 978-3-931533-45-8.
- Scherzer, Veit (2007). Die Ritterkreuzträger 1939–1945 Die Inhaber des Ritterkreuzes des Eisernen Kreuzes 1939 von Heer, Luftwaffe, Kriegsmarine, Waffen-SS, Volkssturm sowie mit Deutschland verbündeter Streitkräfte nach den Unterlagen des Bundesarchives [The Knight's Cross Bearers 1939–1945 The Holders of the Knight's Cross of the Iron Cross 1939 by Army, Air Force, Navy, Waffen-SS, Volkssturm and Allied Forces with Germany According to the Documents of the Federal Archives] (in German). Jena, Germany: Scherzers Militaer-Verlag. ISBN 978-3-938845-17-2.
- Senger und Etterlin, Fridolin von (1960). Krieg in Europa [Neither Fear nor Hope]. Translated by Malcolm, George. London: Macdonald & Co. Ltd.
- Thomas, Franz; Wegmann, Günter (1987). Die Ritterkreuzträger der Deutschen Wehrmacht 1939–1945 Teil III: Infanterie Band 1: A–Be [The Knight's Cross Bearers of the German Wehrmacht 1939–1945 Part III: Infantry Volume 1: A–Be] (in German). Osnabrück, Germany: Biblio-Verlag. ISBN 978-3-7648-1153-2.
- Thomas, Franz (1997). Die Eichenlaubträger 1939–1945 Band 1: A–K [The Oak Leaves Bearers 1939–1945 Volume 1: A–K] (in German). Osnabrück, Germany: Biblio-Verlag. ISBN 978-3-7648-2299-6.
- Webb, James Jack (2024). Generals and Admirals of the Third Reich: For Country or Fuehrer. Vol. 1: A–G. Havertown, PA: Casemate Publishers. ISBN 978-1-952-71512-9.

Military offices
| Preceded by Generalleutnant Eberhard Rodt | Commander of 15. Panzergrenadier-Division; October 1943 – 20 November 1943 | Succeeded by Generalleutnant Rudolf Sperl |
| Preceded by Generalleutnant Carl-Hans Lungershausen | Commander of 90. Panzer-Grenadier-Division; December 1943 – December 1944 | Succeeded by General der Panzertruppe Gerhard von Schwerin |
| Preceded by General der Infanterie Friedrich Köchling | deputy Commander of LXXXI. Armeekorps; 10 March 1945 – 13 April 1945 | Succeeded by disbanded |
