= Wilhelm Crisolli =

German general (1895–1944)

- Born: 20 January 1895; Berlin, German Empire
- Died: 12 September 1944 (aged 49); Pistoia, Italy
- Military career
- Allegiance: German Empire; Weimar Republic; Nazi Germany
- Branch: Army
- Rank: Generalleutnant (Posthumously)
- Commands: 13th Panzer Division; 16th Infantry Division (mot.); 333d Infantry Division; 6th Panzer Division; 20th Luftwaffen Division
- Conflicts: World War II: Gothic Line Offensive †
- Awards: Knight's Cross of the Iron Cross

Wilhelm Crisolli (20 January 1895 – 12 September 1944) was a German general in the Wehrmacht in World War II who commanded several divisions. He was a recipient of the Knight's Cross of the Iron Cross of Nazi Germany. Crisolli was killed 12 September 1944 by members of the Italian resistance. He was posthumously promoted to the rank of Generalleutnant.

== Awards and decorations ==
- Iron Cross (1939) 2nd Class (26 September 1939) & 1st Class (8 October 1939)
- Knight's Cross of the Iron Cross on 15 July 1941 as Oberstleutnant and commander of Schützen-Regiment 8

Military offices
Preceded by Generalleutnant Hellmut von der Chevallerie	Commander of 13. Panzer-Division; 1 December 1942 – 15 May 1943	Succeeded by Generalleutnant Hellmut von der Chevallerie
Preceded by Generalmajor Gerhard Graf von Schwerin	Commander of 16. Infanterie-Division (mot.); 20 May 1943 – 27 June 1943	Succeeded by Generalmajor Gerhard Graf von Schwerin
Preceded by Generalleutnant Rudolf von Tschudi	Commander of 333. Infanterie-Division; 1 July 1943 – 10 July 1943	Succeeded by Generalleutnant Erwin Menny
Preceded by Generalleutnant Walther von Hünersdorff	Commander of 6. Panzer-Division; 14 July 1943 – 21 August 1943	Succeeded by Generalleutnant Rudolf Freiherr von Waldenfels
Preceded by Generalmajor Erich Fronhöfer	Commander of 20. Luftwaffen-Sturm-Division; 25 November 1943 – 12 September 1944	Succeeded by Generalmajor Erich Fronhöfer
