= Eduard Hauser (general) =

WW2 German Army general (1895–1961)

- Born: 22 June 1895; Erlangen, Kingdom of Bavaria, German Empire
- Died: 16 July 1961 (aged 66); Garmisch-Partenkirchen, Bavaria, West Germany
- Military career
- Allegiance: Kingdom of Bavaria; German Empire; Weimar Republic; Nazi Germany
- Branch: Bavarian Army; Imperial German Army; Reichsheer; German Army
- Service years: 1914–1945
- Rank: Generalleutnant
- Commands: 13th Panzer Division
- Conflicts: World War I; World War II; Annexation of the Sudetenland; Invasion of Poland; Battle of France; Operation Barbarossa; Battle of Smolensk (1941); Battle of Moscow; Battle of the Caucasus; Lower Dnieper Offensive; East Prussian Offensive; Zemland Offensive
- Awards: Knight's Cross of the Iron Cross with Oak Leaves

Eduard Hauser (22 June 1895 – 16 July 1961) was a German general in the Wehrmacht during World War II who commanded the 13th Panzer Division. He was a recipient of the Knight's Cross of the Iron Cross with Oak Leaves.

== Biography ==
Born in Bavaria in 1895, Hauser joined the army of Imperial Germany in 1914 as a Fahnenjunker (officer candidate) and served in the 17th Bavarian Infantry Regiment during World War I. As an officer in the Heer (Army) branch of the Wehrmacht, he was on the staff of Generalleutnant (Note: In the Wehrmacht, a generalleutnant was equivalent to the rank of major general in the United States Army.) Heinz Guderian's XIX Corps during the Invasion of Poland before being given command of the 18th Panzer Regiment in 1940. His new command was part of the newly formed 18th Panzer Division and went on to participate in Operation Barbarossa the following year and the subsequent battles along the centre of the Eastern Front.

In late 1941, Hauser, with the rank of oberst (colonel), was given command of 25th Panzer Regiment, 7th Panzer Division. This too was serving on the Eastern Front but by now the winter had set in. Casualties and mechanical attrition were high across the division; at one stage, Hauser's regiment had only five tanks in operation and most personnel were fighting as infantry. During this period he was awarded the Knight's Cross of the Iron Cross. In May 1942, the division was withdrawn to France for recuperation and refit.

On 1 September 1943, Hauser was appointed to command of the 13th Panzer Division, taking over from Hellmut von der Chevallerie who had been wounded. The division had been heavily engaged in fighting in Ukraine, leading a breakout when it, along with the 336th Infantry Division and the 15th Luftwaffe Field Division, became encircled by Soviet forces. Hauser led the division in further fighting in the sector until being wounded in late December 1943. He had been promoted generalmajor (Note: A generalmajor was equivalent to a brigadier general in the United States Army.) earlier that month.

While recovering from his wounds, Hauser was awarded the Knight's Cross of the Iron Cross with Oak Leaves for his service with the 13th Panzer Division. Promoted to generalleutnant, he returned to the Eastern Front as commander of what was designated Division. Stab 605 z.b.V. (Special Purposes Divisional Staff 605), informally known Kampfgruppe Hauser, in June 1944. Part of 4th Army, this operated in the East Prussia sector until April 1945.

After the war, Hauser returned to Bavaria and settled in the town of Garmisch.

== Awards and decorations ==
- Iron Cross (1914) 2nd Class & 1st Class
- Iron Cross (1939) 2nd Class & 1st Class
- Knight's Cross of the Iron Cross on 4 December 1941 as oberst (colonel) and commander of 25th Panzer Regiment
- Knight's Cross of the Iron Cross with Oak Leaves on 26 January 1944 as generalmajor (major general) and commander of 13th Panzer Division

== Notes ==
Footnotes

Citations

Military offices
Preceded by Generalleutnant Hellmut von der Chevallerie	Commander of 13th Panzer Division; 1 September 1943 – 26 December 1943	Succeeded by Generalleutnant Hans Mikosch
