= Kolonia Ossa =

- Village
- Location within Poland
- Coordinates: 51°31′32″N 20°29′05″E
- Country: Poland
- Voivodeship: Masovian
- County: Przysucha
- Gmina: Odrzywół

Kolonia Ossa [kɔˈlɔɲa ˈɔssa] is a village in the administrative district of Gmina Odrzywół, within Przysucha County, Masovian Voivodeship, in east-central Poland.
