= August Schmidt (Wehrmacht) =

German general and Knight's Cross recipient (1892–1972)

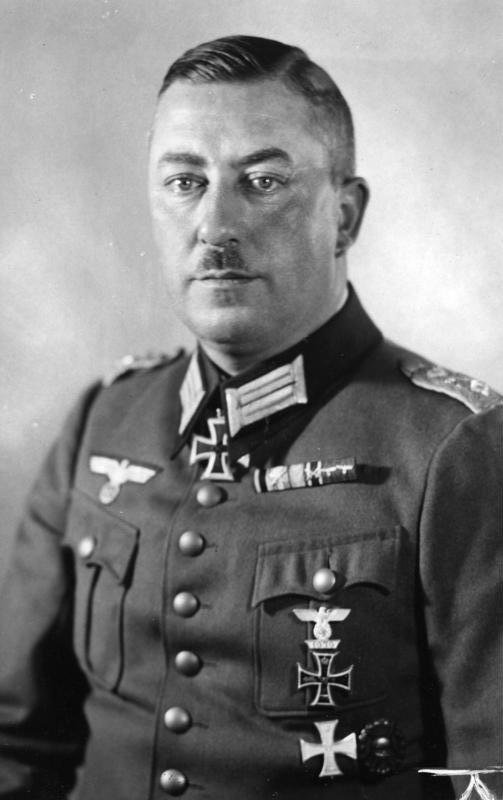
- Born: 3 November 1892; Fürth, Bavaria, German Empire
- Died: 17 January 1972 (aged 79); Munich, Bavaria, West Germany
- Burial place: Munich Waldfriedhof
- Military career
- Allegiance: German Empire; Weimar Republic; Nazi Germany
- Branch: Army
- Service years: 1911–1945
- Rank: Generalleutnant
- Commands: 50th Infantry Division; 10th Panzergrenadier Division; LXXII. Armeekorps
- Conflicts: World War I World War II: Invasion of Poland; Battle of France; Operation Barbarossa; Battle of Białystok–Minsk; Battle of Smolensk (1941); Siege of Sevastopol (1941-1942); Battle of Kursk; Lower Dnieper Offensive; Jassy–Kishinev Offensive (August 1944)
- Awards: Knight's Cross of the Iron Cross with Oak Leaves

August Schmidt (3 November 1892 – 17 January 1972) was a German general who commanded the 10th Panzergrenadier Division during World War II. He was a recipient of the Knight's Cross of the Iron Cross with Oak Leaves of Nazi Germany.

Schmidt surrendered to the Red Army in April 1945. Convicted as a war criminal in the Soviet Union, he was held until 1955.

== Awards and decorations ==
- Iron Cross (1914) 2nd Class (14 September 1914) & 1st Class (14 October 1916)
- Clasp to the Iron Cross (1939) 2nd Class (17 September 1939) & 1st Class (1 October 1939)
- Knight's Cross of the Iron Cross with Oak Leaves
  - Knight's Cross on 27 October 1939 as Oberst and commander of 20th Infantry Regiment
  - Oak Leaves on 23 January 1944 as Generalleutnant and commander of the 10th Panzergrenadier Division

Military offices
Preceded by Generaloberst Karl-Adolf Hollidt	Commander of 50th Infantry Division; 31 January 1942 – 1 March 1942	Succeeded by Generalleutnant Friedrich Schmidt
Preceded by Oberst Hans Traut	Commander of 10th Panzergrenadier Division; May 1942 – September 1944	Succeeded by Generalmajor Walter Herold
Preceded by Generalmajor Georg Zwade	Commander of LXXII. Armeekorps; 15 September 1944 – 22 January 1945	Succeeded by General der Infanterie Anton Grasser
