= Battle of Rostov (1942) =

Battle in the Eastern Front of World War II

- Part of Case Blue in the Eastern Front of World War II
Date	19 July 1942 – 24 July 1942 (5 days)
Location	Rostov-on-Don region, USSR
Result	German victory

Belligerents
Germany	Soviet Union

Commanders and leaders
Wilhelm List; Richard Ruoff; Ewald von Kleist; Wolfram Freiherr von Richthofen; Wilhelm von Apell; Eberhard von Mackensen	Rodion Malinovsky; Andrei Grechko; Viktor Tsyganov

Strength
17th Army	Southern Front

The Battle of Rostov was an episode of the Fall Blau operation, which lasted five days and pitted the 56th Soviet Army, in retreat, against the 17th German Army and 1st Panzer Army which tried to surround it.

It was a definite success for the Germans who, thanks to a "commando" action of the Brandenburg Regiment, took the bridges over the Don, the Bataysk Bridge and the dike to the south of the city and prevented the flooding of swamp, which allowed them to continue their progress towards the Caucasus.

== See also ==
- Battle of Rostov (1941)
- Battle of Rostov (1943) – the Soviet Union recaptured the city.

== Bibliography ==
- Lopez, Jean (2008). Stalingrad: la bataille au bord du gouffre. Campagnes & stratégies (in French) (1st ed.). Paris: Economica. ISBN 978-2717856385.
- Werth, Alexander (1964). Russia At War, 1941-1945. London: Barrie & Rockliff. ISBN 978-2847347609.
- Krivosheev, Grigori (2001). Россия и СССР в войнах XX века. Потери вооруженных сил. Статистическое исследование (in Russian). Moscow: Olma-Press. ISBN 5-224-01515-4.
