= Wilhelm von Apell =

German general (1892–1969)

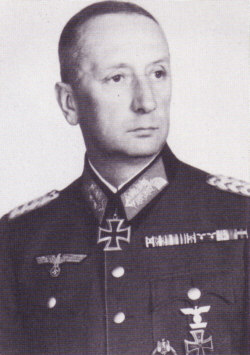
- Born: 16 January 1892; Bückeburg, Schaumburg-Lippe
- Died: 7 March 1969 (aged 77); Varnhalt
- Military career
- Allegiance: German Empire; Weimar Republic; Nazi Germany
- Branch: German Army
- Service years: 1910–1945
- Rank: Generalleutnant
- Commands: 22nd Panzer Division
- Conflicts: World War I; World War II; Invasion of Poland; Battle of the Netherlands; Battle of France; Invasion of Yugoslavia; Battle of Greece; Battle of the Kerch Peninsula
- Awards: Knight's Cross of the Iron Cross

Wilhelm von Apell (16 January 1892 – 7 March 1969) was a German general in the Wehrmacht during World War II who commanded the 22nd Panzer Division. He was a recipient of the Knight's Cross of the Iron Cross of Nazi Germany.

== Biography ==
Born in 1892, Apell joined the army of Imperial Germany as an Fahnen-junker (officer cadet) in 1910. He was commissioned in the light infantry and fought in World War I. He was awarded the Iron Cross, 1st and 2nd class, the Military Merit Order of Bavaria, 4th class with swords, the Hanseatic Cross of Hamburg and the Wound Badge in silver. In the interwar period, he served in the Reichsheer and then the Wehrmacht. He led the 11th Cavalry Rifle Regiment of the 4th Light Division from 1938 to 1940, fighting in the Invasion of Poland.

The 4th Light Division converted to armour in early 1940 and then, designated the 9th Panzer Division, it served in the campaign in the Netherlands and the Battle of France. It was also involved in the Invasion of Yugoslavia and Battle of Greece the following year. By now, Apell, still with the division, was commander of the 9th Schützen (Rifle) Brigade. During his period in command of the 9th Schützen Brigade, he was awarded the Knight's Cross of the Iron Cross.

In September 1941 and now a generalmajor, (Note: In the Wehrmacht, the rank of generalmajor is equivalent to that of brigadier general in the United States Army.) Apell was appointed commander of the newly raised 22nd Panzer Division. Formed in France, much of the division's equipment was captured and foreign equipment with relatively few modern tanks. With its training completed, the division was transferred to the Eastern Front in February 1942. Apell led the division through the Battle of the Kerch Peninsula until July 1942, when he became ill and was replaced.

Not returned to his command upon recovering his health, Apell was placed in the Führerreserve (Leader's Reserve) until March 1943. He was made the Replacement Army Inspector in Vienna and, having received a promotion to generalleutnant, (Note: The rank of generalleutnant is equivalent to that of major general in the United States Army.) served in this role for the remainder of the war. He died in the village of Varnhalt, near Baden-Baden, on 7 March 1969.

== Notes ==
Footnotes

Citations

Military offices
New title	Commander of 22nd Panzer Division; 25 September 1941 – 7 October 1942	Succeeded by Generalleutnant Hellmut von der Chevallerie
