= Mainville (surname) =

Mainville is a surname. Notable people with the surname include:

- Louis-Pierre Mainville (born 1986), Canadian volleyball player
- Pierre Mainville, Canadian politician
- Sandrine Mainville (born 1992), Canadian swimmer
