= 265th Infantry Division =

German WWII infantry division

The 265th Infantry Division (German: 265. Infanterie-Division) was an infantry division of the German Heer during World War II.

== History ==
The 265th Infantry Division was formed after an OKH directive on 20 May 1943 as a static (i.e. non-motorized) division, intended for occupation duty in France. The initial divisional commander was Walter Düvert. The staff was formed on 3 June 1943 from staff personnel of the 403rd Security Division.

After the Normandy landings in June 1944, a part of the 265th Infantry Division, at Kampfgruppe strength, was involved in combat against the Western allies. On 27 July 1944, Hans Junck took command of the division.

On 2 October 1944, the division was formally dissolved and disbanded in Rudolstadt until 24 January 1945. The remnants of the division's formations were trapped in the Atlantic pockets.

== Divisional order of battle ==
The initial forces were assembled from various Wehrkreis districts from northern Germany and included:

- Grenadier Regiment 894 (three battalions).
- Grenadier Regiment 895 (two battalions).
- Grenadier Regiment 896 (two battalions).
- Artillery Regiment 265 (three artillery detachments).

The detachments of Artillery Regiment 265 were equipped with Soviet-made Beutewaffe artillery guns.

In October 1943, the 1st battalion of Grenadier Regiment 894 was transferred to the Eastern Front. This battalion was later replaced within the 894th Regiment by the North Caucasian Battalion 800 on 19 April 1944. Additionally, the Eastern Battalion 654 was integrated as the 3rd battalion into Grenadier Regiment 895, bringing the division to a total of eight battalions.

== Superior formations ==
Organizational chart of the 265th Infantry Division
Year	Month	Army Corps	Army	Army Group	Area
1943	July	In deployment.			Bergen, Lower Saxony
1943	August – December	XXV	7th Army	Army Group D	Brittany (Quimper)
1944	January – April	XXV	7th Army	Army Group D	Brittany (Quimper)
1944	May – June	XXV	7th Army	Army Group B	Brittany (Quimper)
1944	July	XXV	7th Army	Army Group B	Brittany (Quimper)
1944	August – September	XXV (partially) LXXXIV (partially)	7th Army	Army Group B	Normandy
Formally dissolved on 2 October 1944. Divisional remnants continue fighting in Atlantic pockets.
1944	October – December	XXV	None.	Army Group D	Atlantic pockets
1945	January – April	XXV	None.	Army Group D	Atlantic pockets

== Noteworthy individuals ==
- Walter Düvert, divisional commander between 1 June 1943 and 27 July 1944.
- Hans Junck, divisional commander between 27 July 1944 and 2 October 1944.
