= Myślakowice =

- Village
- Location within Poland
- Coordinates: 51°36′07″N 20°28′15″E
- Country: Poland
- Voivodeship: Masovian
- County: Przysucha
- Gmina: Odrzywół

Myślakowice [mɨɕlakɔˈvit͡sɛ] is a village in the administrative district of Gmina Odrzywół, within Przysucha County, Masovian Voivodeship, in east-central Poland.
