= 10th Infantry Division (Wehrmacht) =

10th Infantry Division 10th Motorized Infantry Division 10th Panzergrenadier Division
- German: 10. Infanterie-Division; 10. Infanterie-Division (mot.); 10. Panzergrenadier-Division
- Unit insignia
- Active: 1 October 1934 – 8 May 1945
- Country: Nazi Germany
- Branch: German Army
- Type: Infantry; Panzergrenadier
- Role: Motorized Infantry
- Size: Division
- Engagements: World War II

The 10th Infantry Division was created in October 1934 under the cover name Wehrgauleitung Regensburg (later Kommandant von Regensburg) to hide its violation of the Treaty of Versailles. It was renamed the 10th Infantry Division when the establishment of the Wehrmacht was announced publicly in October 1935.

The division participated in the annexation of Austria in March 1938, the invasion of Poland in September 1939, and the invasion of France in May 1940. Thereafter it was upgraded to the 10th Motorized Infantry Division. It was later redesignated 10th Panzergrenadier Division in June 1943.

In August 1944 the division was destroyed in the Jassy–Kishinev Offensive and ensuing defensive actions. It was partially reconstituted in Germany in October, and sent back to the front as an understrength Kampfgruppe ("battlegroup").

On 1 January 1945, the 10th Panzergrenadier Division, then under command of the 4th Panzer Army of Army Group A, had a strength of 5,932 men (and was thus the numerically weakest division of its entire army group).

It was destroyed again in Poland in January 1945 and again partially reconstituted in February. The division finally surrendered to the Soviets in Czechoslovakia at the end of the war.

== Involvement in war crimes ==
Elements of the division took part in atrocities against the civilian population during the invasion of Poland. Together with elements of the 17th Infantry Division, they took part in the murder of at least 14 civilians during the division's advance towards Sieradz and Łask.

== Organisation (1939) ==
- Infanterie-Regiment 20.
- Infanterie-Regiment 41.
- Infanterie-Regiment 85.
- Artillerie-Regiment 10.
- I./Artillerie-Regiment 46.
- 10th Divisional Support Units
  - Beobachtungs-Abteilung 10.
  - Pionier-Bataillon 10.
  - Panzerabwehr-Abteilung 10.
  - Nachrichten-Abteilung 10.
  - Feldersatz-Bataillon 10.
  - Versorgungseinheiten 10.

== Commanding officers ==
- Generalleutnant Alfred Wäger (October 1933 – March 1938)
- Generalleutnant Konrad von Cochenhausen (March 1938 – September 1940)
- Generalleutnant Friedrich-Wilhelm von Loeper (October 1940 – April 1942)
- Oberst Hans Traut April 1942 – April 1942
- Generalleutnant August Schmidt (May 1942 – September 1944)
- Generalmajor Walter Herold (October 1944 – November 1944)
- Oberst Alexander Vial (December 1944 – January 1945)
- Generalmajor Karl-Richard Koßmann (January 1945 – May 1945)

== Sources ==
=== Literature ===
- Müller-Hillebrand, Burkhard (1969). Das Heer 1933–1945. Entwicklung des organisatorischen Aufbaues (in German). Vol. III: Der Zweifrontenkrieg. Das Heer vom Beginn des Feldzuges gegen die Sowjetunion bis zum Kriegsende. Frankfurt am Main: Mittler. p. 285.
- Schmidt, August (1963). Geschichte der 10. Division: 10. Infanterie-Division, 10. Panzer-Grenadier-Division, 1933-1945 (in German). Bad Nauheim: Podzun.
- Tessin, Georg (1967). Verbände und Truppen der deutschen Wehrmacht und Waffen-SS im Zweiten Weltkrieg, 1939–1945 (in German). Vol. III: Die Landstreitkräfte 6–14. Frankfurt am Main: Mittler.
