= 233 BC =

233 BC in various calendars
Gregorian calendar	233 BC; CCXXXIII BC
Ab urbe condita	521
Ancient Egypt era	XXXIII dynasty, 91
Pharaoh	Ptolemy III Euergetes, 14
Ancient Greek Olympiad (summer)	136th Olympiad, year 4
Assyrian calendar	4518
Balinese saka calendar	N/A
Bengali calendar	−826 – −825
Berber calendar	718
Buddhist calendar	312
Burmese calendar	−870
Byzantine calendar	5276–5277
Chinese calendar	丁卯年 (Fire Rabbit); 2465 or 2258 — to — 戊辰年 (Earth Dragon); 2466 or 2259
Coptic calendar	−516 – −515
Discordian calendar	934
Ethiopian calendar	−240 – −239
Hebrew calendar	3528–3529
- Hindu calendars
Vikram Samvat	−176 – −175
Shaka Samvat	N/A
Kali Yuga	2868–2869
Holocene calendar	9768
Iranian calendar	854 BP – 853 BP
Islamic calendar	880 BH – 879 BH
Javanese calendar	N/A
Julian calendar	N/A
Korean calendar	2101
Minguo calendar	2144 before ROC 民前2144年
Nanakshahi calendar	−1700
Seleucid era	79/80 AG
Thai solar calendar	310–311
Tibetan calendar	阴火兔年 (female Fire-Rabbit) −106 or −487 or −1259 — to — 阳土龙年 (male Earth-Dragon) −105 or −486 or −1258

Year 233 BC was a year of the pre-Julian Roman calendar. It was formerly known as the Year of the Consulship of Verrucosus and Matho (or, less frequently, year 521 Ab urbe condita). The denomination 233 BC has been used since the early medieval period, when the Anno Domini calendar era became the prevalent method in Europe for naming years.

== Events ==
=== By place ===
==== China ====
- The Zhao general Li Mu defeats the Qin army, led by Huan Yi, in the Battle of Fei.

== Deaths ==
- Deidamia II is the Greek princess and daughter of Pyrrhus II of Epirus (approximate date)
- Han Fei, Chinese philosopher who, along with Li Si, has developed Xun Zi's philosophy into the doctrine embodied by the School of Law (or Legalism) (b. c. 280 BC)
