= Mairy-Mainville =

- Commune
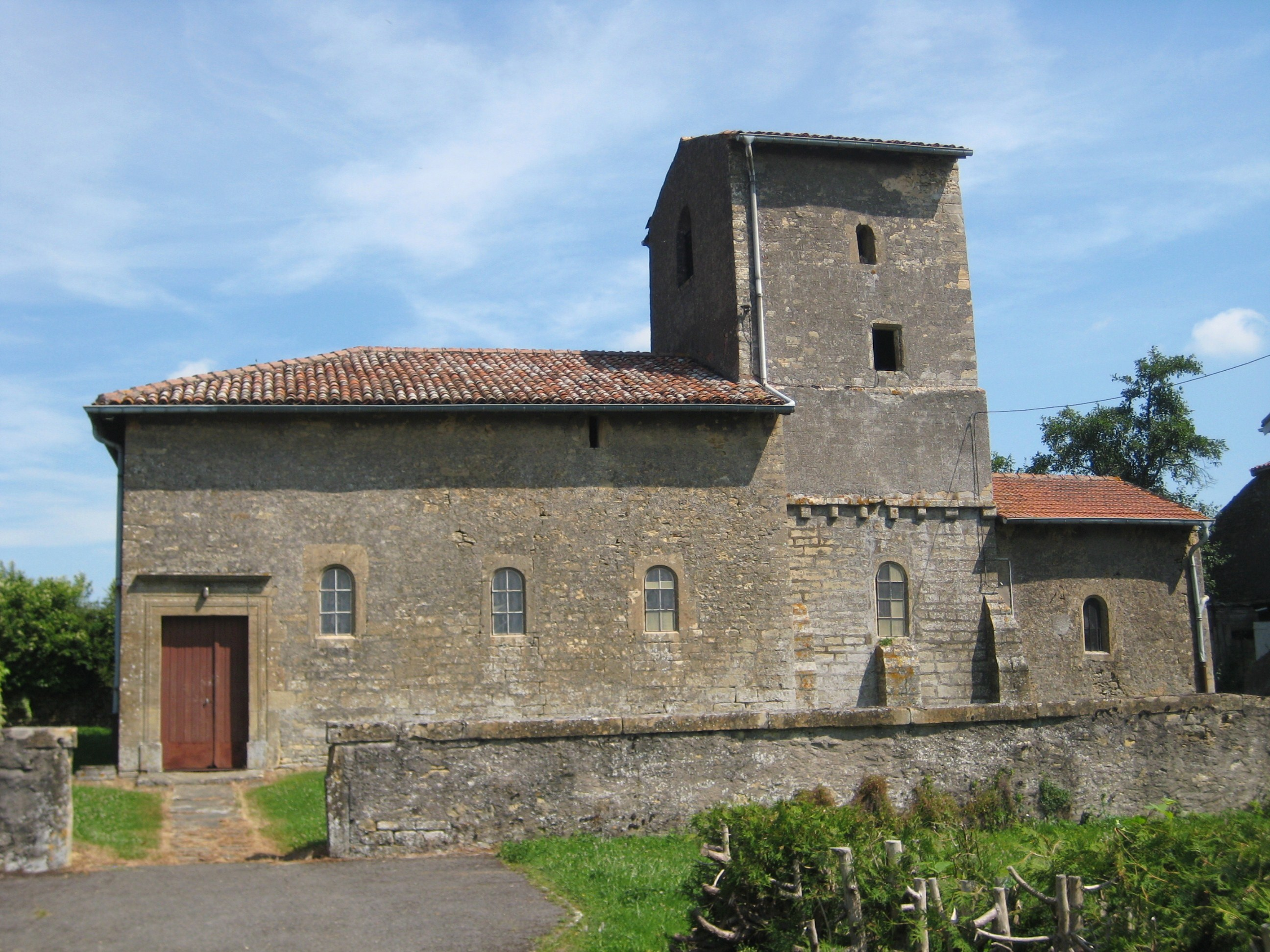
- The church in Mainville

- Coat of arms
- Location of Mairy-Mainville
- Location within France Location within Grand Est
- Coordinates: 49°18′16″N 5°51′34″E
- Country: France
- Region: Grand Est
- Department: Meurthe-et-Moselle
- Arrondissement: Val-de-Briey
- Canton: Pays de Briey
- Intercommunality: CC Cœur du Pays-Haut

Government
  - Mayor (2020–2026): Norbert Kuen
- Area^{1}: 12.42 km^{2} (4.80 sq mi)
- Elevation: 200 m (660 ft)
- Highest elevation: 325 m (1,066 ft)
- Lowest elevation: 237 m (778 ft)
- Population (2023): 551
  - Density: 44.4/km^{2} (115/sq mi)
- Time zone: UTC+01:00 (CET)
  - Summer (DST): UTC+02:00 (CEST)
- INSEE/Postal code: 54334 /54150
- ^{1} French Land Register data, which excludes lakes, ponds, glaciers > 1 km^{2} (0.386 sq mi or 247 acres) and river estuaries.

Mairy-Mainville (French pronunciation: [mɛʁi mɛ̃vil]) is a commune in the Meurthe-et-Moselle department in north-eastern France.

== See also ==
- Communes of the Meurthe-et-Moselle department
