= 279th Infantry Division =

Planned German WWII infantry division

The 279th Infantry Division (German: 279. Infanterie-Division) was a planned infantry division of the German Heer during World War II. Its deployment, ordered in May 1940, was interrupted in June after the Franco-German armistice.

== History ==
On 22 May 1940, the assembly of the tenth Aufstellungswelle was ordered by a military directive, and the divisions of the tenth wave were scheduled to complete deployment by 1 July. After the Armistice of 22 June 1940 between Germany and the French Third Republic, the deployment of the divisions of the tenth wave was aborted. The regiments assigned to the 279th Infantry Division, the Infantry Regiments 550, 551, and 552, as well as the Artillery Regiment 279, were returned to their reserve formations in Germany. The 279th Infantry Division was not redeployed.

The sole commander of the 279th Infantry Division during its assembly was Herbert Stimmel.
