= Ludwik Żychliński =

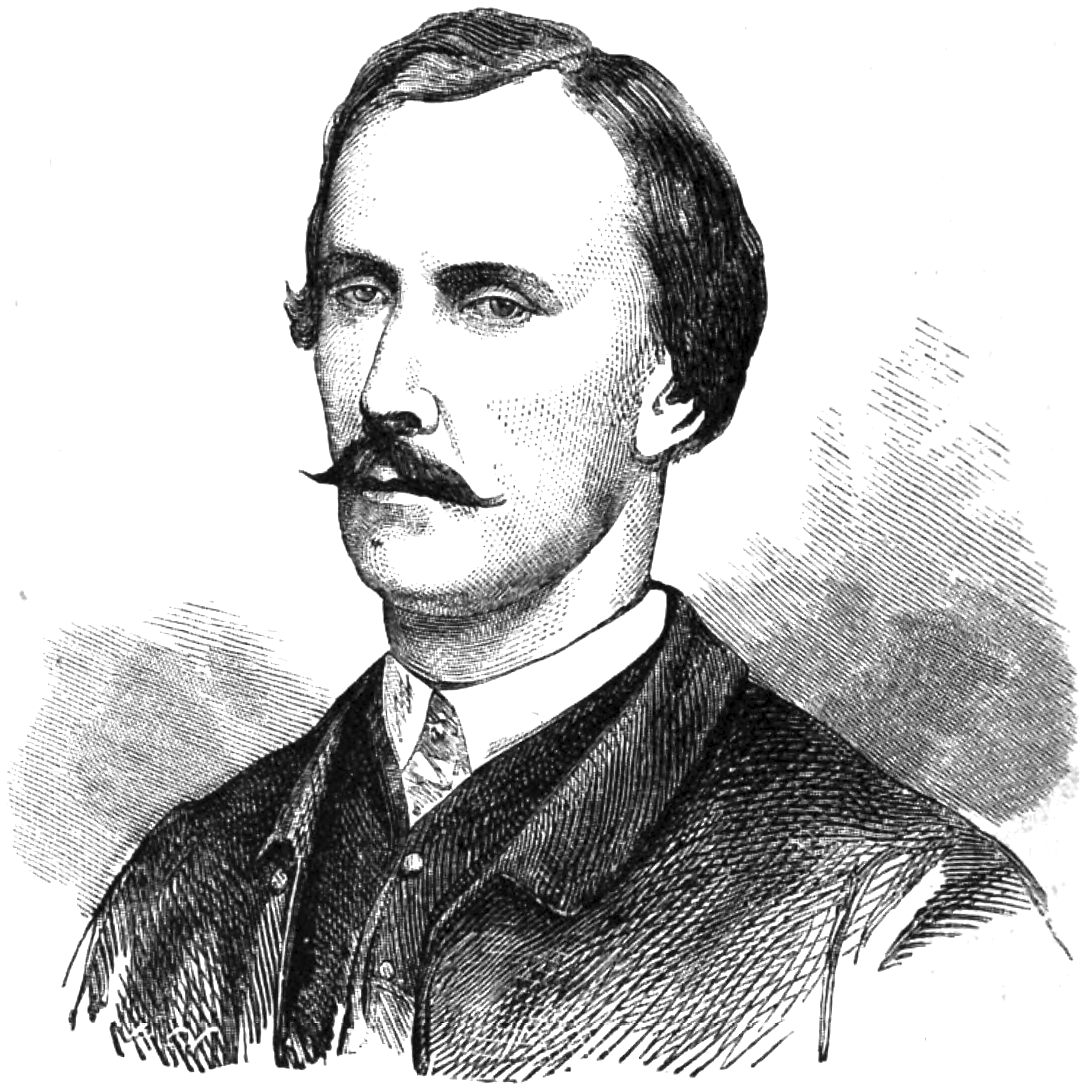
- L. Żychliński
- Born: 1837; Poznań Voivodeship, Poland
- Died: after 1901 (aged 63–64); Brusno, Lubaczów County, Poland
- Occupations: Polish activist, pułkownik

Ludwik Żychliński (born 1837 in Grand Duchy of Posen, d. after 1901 in Brusno, Lubaczów County) was a Polish patriotic activist, pułkownik (military officer), and diarist. Żychliński participated in Giuseppe Garibaldi's expedition of Sicily (1860). During the American Civil War, he fought by the Union side (1862–1863). He was a pułkownik at the January Uprising of 1863–1864.

== Notable works ==
- Machiawell, jego życie i pewne wybitne strony, zawarte w jego dwóch głównych pismach historyczno-politycznych, 1861

Memoirs:

- Pamiętniki z wojny amerykańskiej 1862 r.
- Pamiętniki byłego dowódcy Dzieci Warszawy...
- Przygody Wielkopolanina w Azji i Ameryce...
- Wrażenia i przygody zesłanego w Sybir Wielkopolanina
