= 233rd Reserve Panzer Division =

Division 233 (motorisiert) 233rd Panzergrenadier-Division 233rd Panzer-Division 233rd Reserve Panzer Division
- Active: August 1943 – April 1945
- Country: Nazi Germany
- Branch: Army
- Type: Panzer
- Role: Armoured warfare
- Size: Division
- Nickname: Holstein
- Engagements: World War II

Commanders
- Notable commanders: Kurt Cuno, Max Fremerey, Hellmut von der Chevallerie

The 233rd Reserve Panzer Division was a German panzer division during World War II which was mainly deployed in Denmark.

== History ==
The division was before known as the Division 233 (motorisiert) (15 May – 7 July 1942), 233rd Panzergrenadier-Division (7 July 1942 – 5 April 1943) and 233rd Panzer-Division (5 April – 8 August 1943).

The 233rd Panzer Division was redesignated the 233rd Reserve Panzer Division on 8 August 1943 under the command of Kurt Cuno, and was posted to central Jutland in Denmark from 18 November. It remained in Denmark, headquartered at Horsens, where it trained panzer crews and motorised troops. It saw no combat apart from occasional Allied bombing raids.

It became known as the Panzer Division Holstein after mergers with other Panzer divisions on 10 February 1945 and was then again renamed back to the 233rd Panzer Division as new Divisional headquarters were hastily set up in April 1945. Much of this unit was then assimilated into the new Clausewitz Panzer Division.

== Order of battle ==
- 5. Reserve Panzer Regiment situated at Viborg
- 3. Panzer Reconnaissance Battalion situated at Mariager, Hobro and Hadsund
- 83. Reserve Panzergrenadier Regiment situated at Aarhus
- 3. Reserve Panzergrenadier Regiment situated at Odder
- 59. Reserve Artillery Battalion situated at Randers
- 3. Reserve Panzerjäger Battalion
- 208. Reserve Panzer Pioneer Battalion

== Commanders ==
- General der Artillerie Curt Jahn (7 July 1942 – 1 March 1943)
- Generalleutnant Heinrich Wosch (1 March 1943 – 8 August 1943)
- Generalleutnant Kurt Cuno (8 August 1943 – 20 May 1944)
- Generalleutnant Max Fremerey (20 May 1944 – 14 August 1944)
- Generalleutnant Hellmut von der Chevallerie (15 August 1944 – 3 October 1944)
- Generalleutnant Max Fremerey (4 October 1944 - ? April 1945)
