= 273rd Reserve Panzer Division =

The German 273rd Reserve Panzer Division was a reserve army division. After the Battle of Kursk the German 273rd Reserve Panzer Division was used for augmenting of 11th Panzer Division, whereas their remaining forces were shifted to the Italian front.

== Organization ==
Organization of the Division in 1943 (when it was formed):

- Headquarters - Under Lieutenant general Helmuth von der Chevallerie
- 25th Reserve Panzer Battalion
- 35th Reserve Panzer Battalion
- 92nd Reserve Panzergrenadier Regiment
- 73rd Reserve Motorized Grenadier Regiment
- 167th Reserve Artillery Battalion
- 7th Reserve Panzer Reconnaissance Battalion
- 7th Reserve Tank Destroyer Battalion
- 10th Reserve Tank Destroyer Battalion
- 19th Reserve Panzer Engineer Battalion
- Reserve Panzer Division Supply Group

== Bibliography ==
- Mitcham, Samuel W. (2000). The Panzer Legions. Mechanicsburg: Stackpole Books. ISBN 978-0-8117-3353-3.
- Tessin, Georg (1974). "Die Landstreitkräfte 201—280". Verbände und Truppen der deutschen Wehrmacht und Waffen SS im Zweiten Weltkrieg 1939—1945 (in German). Vol. 8. Frankfurt/Main: E.S. Mittler. pp. 312–313.
