= List of Knight's Cross of the Iron Cross recipients (Ha–Hm) =

The Knight's Cross of the Iron Cross (German: Ritterkreuz des Eisernen Kreuzes) and its variants were the highest awards in the military and paramilitary forces of Nazi Germany during World War II. The Knight's Cross of the Iron Cross was awarded for a wide range of reasons and across all ranks, from a senior commander for skilled leadership of his troops in battle to a low-ranking soldier for a single act of extreme gallantry. A total of 7,321 awards were made between its first presentation on 30 September 1939 and its last bestowal on 17 June 1945. (Note: Großadmiral and President of Germany Karl Dönitz, Hitler's successor as Head of State (Staatsoberhaupt) and Supreme Commander of the Armed Forces, had ordered the cessation of all promotions and awards as of 11 May 1945 (Dönitz-decree). Consequently the last Knight's Cross awarded to Oberleutnant zur See of the Reserves Georg-Wolfgang Feller on 17 June 1945 must therefore be considered a de facto but not de jure hand-out.) This number is based on the analysis and acceptance of the order commission of the Association of Knight's Cross Recipients (AKCR). Presentations were made to members of the three military branches of the Wehrmacht—the Heer (Army), Kriegsmarine (Navy) and Luftwaffe (Air Force)—as well as the Waffen-SS, the Reichsarbeitsdienst (RAD—Reich Labour Service) and the Volkssturm (German national militia). There were also 43 recipients in the military forces of allies of the Third Reich.

These recipients are listed in the 1986 edition of Walther-Peer Fellgiebel's book, Die Träger des Ritterkreuzes des Eisernen Kreuzes 1939–1945 [The Bearers of the Knight's Cross of the Iron Cross 1939–1945]. Fellgiebel was the former chairman and head of the order commission of the AKCR. In 1996, the second edition of this book was published with an addendum delisting 11 of these original recipients. Author Veit Scherzer has cast doubt on a further 193 of these listings. The majority of the disputed recipients had been nominated for the award in 1945, when the deteriorating situation of Germany during the final days of World War II left a number of nominations incomplete and pending in various stages of the approval process.

Listed here are the 437 Knight's Cross recipients of the Wehrmacht and Waffen-SS whose last name is in the range "Ha–Hm". Fellgiebel himself delisted one and Scherzer has challenged the validity of 15 more of these listings. This is the first of two lists of all 661 Knight's Cross of the Iron Cross recipients whose last name starts with "H". The recipients whose last name is in the range "Hn–Hz" are listed at List of Knight's Cross of the Iron Cross recipients (Hn–Hz). The recipients are initially ordered alphabetically by last name. The rank listed is the recipient's rank at the time the Knight's Cross was awarded.

== Background ==
The Knight's Cross of the Iron Cross and its higher grades were based on four separate enactments. The first enactment, Reichsgesetzblatt I S. 1573 of 1 September 1939 instituted the Iron Cross (Eisernes Kreuz), the Knight's Cross of the Iron Cross and the Grand Cross of the Iron Cross (Großkreuz des Eisernen Kreuzes). Article 2 of the enactment mandated that the award of a higher class be preceded by the award of all preceding classes. As the war progressed, some of the recipients of the Knight's Cross distinguished themselves further and a higher grade, the Knight's Cross of the Iron Cross with Oak Leaves (Ritterkreuz des Eisernen Kreuzes mit Eichenlaub), was instituted. The Oak Leaves, as they were commonly referred to, were based on the enactment Reichsgesetzblatt I S. 849 of 3 June 1940. In 1941, two higher grades of the Knight's Cross were instituted. The enactment Reichsgesetzblatt I S. 613 of 28 September 1941 introduced the Knight's Cross of the Iron Cross with Oak Leaves and Swords (Ritterkreuz des Eisernen Kreuzes mit Eichenlaub und Schwertern) and the Knight's Cross of the Iron Cross with Oak Leaves, Swords and Diamonds (Ritterkreuz des Eisernen Kreuzes mit Eichenlaub, Schwertern und Brillanten). At the end of 1944 the final grade, the Knight's Cross of the Iron Cross with Golden Oak Leaves, Swords, and Diamonds (Ritterkreuz des Eisernen Kreuzes mit goldenem Eichenlaub, Schwertern und Brillanten), based on the enactment Reichsgesetzblatt 1945 I S. 11 of 29 December 1944, became the final variant of the Knight's Cross authorized.

== Recipients ==
Knight's Cross of the Iron Cross (Ha–Hm)
Service	Number of presentations	Posthumous presentations
Heer	276	23
Kriegsmarine	17	0
Luftwaffe	116	9
Waffen-SS	27	1

The Oberkommando der Wehrmacht (Supreme Command of the Armed Forces) kept separate Knight's Cross lists for the Waffen-SS and for each of the three military branches, the Heer (Army), Kriegsmarine (Navy), and Luftwaffe (Air Force). Within each of these lists a unique sequential number was assigned to each recipient. The same numbering paradigm was applied to the higher grades of the Knight's Cross, one list per grade. Of the 437 awards made to servicemen whose last name is in the range "Ha–Hm", 40 were later awarded the Knight's Cross of the Iron Cross with Oak Leaves, 12 the Knight's Cross of the Iron Cross with Oak Leaves and Swords and one the Knight's Cross of the Iron Cross with Oak Leaves, Swords and Diamonds; 33 presentations were made posthumously. Heer members received 276 of the medals; 17 went to the Kriegsmarine, 117 to the Luftwaffe, and 27 to the Waffen-SS. The sequential numbers greater than 843 for the Knight's Cross of the Iron Cross with Oak Leaves and 143 for the Knight's Cross of the Iron Cross with Oak Leaves and Swords are unofficial and were assigned by the Association of Knight's Cross Recipients (AKCR) and are denoted in parentheses.

This along with the + (plus) indicates that a higher grade of Knight's Cross was awarded as well.
This along with the * (asterisk) indicates that the Knight's Cross was awarded posthumously.
This along with the ! (exclamation mark) indicates that author Walther-Peer Fellgiebel has expressed doubt regarding the veracity and formal correctness of the listing.
This along with the ? (question mark) indicates that author Veit Scherzer has expressed doubt regarding the veracity and formal correctness of the listing.

Name	Service	Rank	Role and unit (Note: For an explanation of the various naming schemes used by the Luftwaffe, Heer, Kriegsmarine and Waffen-SS refer to nomenclature used by the Wehrmacht and Waffen-SS.)	Date of award	Notes	Image
Heinz Haag	Kriegsmarine	Oberleutnant zur See	Commander of Schnellboot S-60 in the 3. Schnellbootflottille	25 November 1944	—	—
Walter Haarhaus	Heer	Major	Commander of the I./Infanterie-Regiment 477	1 February 1942	—	—
Friedrich Haas	Luftwaffe	Leutnant	Staffelführer of the 5./Jagdgeschwader 52	26 April 1945*	Killed in action 9 April 1945	—
Josef Haas	Heer	Oberst	Commander of Grenadier-Regiment 485	14 November 1943	—	—
Robert Haas	Heer	Leutnant of the Reserves	Leader of the I./Sturmgeschütz-Brigade 244	25 January 1945*	Killed in action 23 December 1944	—
Alfred Haase	Heer	Major	Commander of Pionier-Lehr-Bataillon 2 and leader of a Kampfgruppe	1 April 1942	—	—
Curt Haase	Heer	General der Artillerie	Commanding general of the III. Armeekorps	8 June 1940	—	
Heinz-Georg Haase	Heer	Oberfeldwebel	Zugführer (platoon leader) in the 11./Grenadier-Regiment 122	2 September 1943	—	—
Hermann Haase	Heer	Hauptmann	Leader of the I./Grenadier-Regiment 423	5 September 1944*	Killed in action 30 July 1944	—
Horst Haase	Luftwaffe	Hauptmann	Gruppenkommandeur of the IV./Jagdgeschwader 3 "Udet" (Note: According to Scherzer as Staffelkapitän of the 16.(Sturm)/Jagdgeschwader 3 "Udet".)	24 October 1944	—	—
Horst Haase	Heer	Oberleutnant of the Reserves	Leader of Panzer-Jäger-Kompanie 1162	1 February 1945	—	—
Ernst Haccius	Heer	Generalleutnant	Commander of the 46. Infanterie-Division	2 April 1943*	Killed in action 10 February 1943 (Note: According to Scherzer on 11 February 1943.)	—
Wilhelm Hachfeld	Luftwaffe	Hauptmann	Gruppenkommandeur of the III./Zerstörergeschwader 2	29 October 1942	—	—
August Hachtel	Luftwaffe	Oberfeldwebel	Pilot in the 4./Sturzkampfgeschwader 1	6 January 1942	—	—
Georg Hachtel	Heer	Oberst	Commander of Jäger-Regiment 56	30 April 1943	—	—
Franz Hack+	Waffen-SS	SS-Sturmbannführer	Commander of the III.(gepanzert)/SS-Panzergrenadier-Regiment 9 "Germania"	14 May 1943	Awarded (844th) Oak Leaves 18 April 1945? (Note: The recommendation for Franz Hack's Oak Leaves to the Knight's Cross was submitted to the Heerespersonalamt by the Division sometime between 16 and 19 April 1945 and approved by the commander of the IV. SS-Korps Herbert Otto Gille. Missing is the approval from the 6. Armee and Heeresgruppe Süd. There is no indication whether the recommendation was approved. The response from the Reichsführer-SS was prepared but missing is a date and signature. The existing card is not contemporary. There is no indication in the press that the award was presented. According to Fellgiebel Hack received the Oak Leaves from SS-Obergruppenführer and General of the SS Herbert-Otto Gille, commanding general IV. SS-Panzerkorps. The sequential number "844" and date of award were assigned by the Association of Knight's Cross Recipients (AKCR).)	—
Willi Hackbarth	Heer	Gefreiter	Radio operator in the 4./Artillerie-Regiment 32	18 April 1943	—	—
Anton Hackl+	Luftwaffe	Oberleutnant	Staffelkapitän of the 5./Jagdgeschwader 77	25 May 1942	Awarded 109th Oak Leaves 9 August 1942; 78th Swords 9 July 1944 (Note: According to Scherzer 109th Oak Leaves on 7 August 1942 and 78th Swords on 12 July 1944.)	—
Leopold Hackl	Luftwaffe	Fahnenjunker-Oberfeldwebel	Pilot in the Stab/Nachtschlachtgruppe 3	20 March 1945	—	—
Dr. Martin Hackl	Heer	Leutnant of the Reserves	Leader of the 2./Gebirgs-Aufklärungs-Abteilung 94	7 December 1943	—	—
Heinz Hackler	Luftwaffe	Fahnenjunker-Oberfeldwebel	Pilot in the III./Jagdgeschwader 77	19 August 1944	—	—
Heinz-Martin Hadeball	Luftwaffe	Hauptmann	Gruppenkommandeur of the I./Nachtjagdgeschwader 6 (Note: According to Scherzer as Staffelkapitän of the 3./Nachtjagdgeschwader 6.)	27 July 1944	—	—
Friedrich Hadenfeldt	Heer	Oberstleutnant (Note: According to Scherzer as Oberstleutnant of the Reserves.)	Commander of Artillerie-Regiment 1818	17 March 1945	—	—
Hermann Haderecker	Heer	Major	Leader of Grenadier-Regiment 20 (motorized)	4 May 1944	—	—
Klaus Häberlen	Luftwaffe	Hauptmann	Gruppenkommandeur of the I./Kampfgeschwader 51	20 June 1943	—	—
Ernst Haeckel	Heer	Generalleutnant	Commander of the 16. Volksgrenadier-Division	28 October 1944	—	—
Franz Haecker	Heer	Oberfeldwebel	Zugführer (platoon leader) in the 5./Grenadier-Regiment 211	16 March 1944	—	—
Josef Häfele	Heer	Oberfeldwebel	Zugführer (platoon leader) in the 11./Gebirgsjäger-Regiment 99	18 November 1941	—	—
Ludwig Häfner	Luftwaffe	Leutnant	Pilot in the 6./Jagdgeschwader 3 "Udet" (Note: According to Scherzer as a pilot in the I./Jagdgeschwader 3 "Udet".)	21 December 1942*	Killed in action 10 November 1942	—
Willi Hägele	Luftwaffe	Hauptmann	Chief of the 9./Flak-Regiment 14	30 September 1944	—	—
Kurt Haehling	Heer	Generalmajor	Commander of the 126. Infanterie-Division	2 March 1945	—	—
Wilhelm Haehnel	Heer	Leutnant	Leader of the 4./Artillerie-Regiment 157	21 February 1944	—	—
Hartwich Haellmigk	Heer	Oberst	Commander of Grenadier-Regiment 301	19 November 1943	—	—
Heinz Hämel	Waffen-SS	SS-Hauptsturmführer (Note: According to Scherzer as SS-Hauptsturmführer of the Reserves and leader of the II./SS-Panzergrenadier-Regiment 24 "Danmark".)	Leader of the II./SS-Freiwilligen-Panzergrenadier-Regiment 24 "Danmark"	16 June 1944	—	—
Rudolf Haen+	Heer	Hauptmann	Chief of the 1./Panzer-Abteilung 103	18 December 1942	Awarded 590th Oak Leaves 21 September 1944	—
Karl Hänert	Heer	Oberleutnant	Chief of the 4.(MG)/Infanterie-Regiment "Großdeutschland" (motorized) (Note: According to Scherzer as chief of the 4./Infanterie-Regiment (motorized) "Großdeutschland".)	23 August 1941	—	—
Siegfried Haenicke	Heer	Generalleutnant zur Verwendung (for disposition)	Commander of the 61. Infanterie-Division	17 September 1941	—	—
Helmut Haeuseler	Heer	Oberstleutnant	Commander of Grenadier-Regiment 399	14 February 1945	—	—
Ernst Häußler	Waffen-SS	SS-Sturmbannführer	Commander of the II./SS-Panzergrenadier-Regiment 5 "Totenkopf" (Note: According to Scherzer as commander of the SS-Panzergrenadier-Regiment "Thule".)	15 August 1943	—	A man wearing a camouflage military uniform, side cap and neck order in the shape of a cross. His cap has an emblem in shape of a human skull and crossed bones.
Anton Hafner+	Luftwaffe	Feldwebel	Pilot in the 6./Jagdgeschwader 51 "Mölders"	23 August 1942	Awarded 452nd Oak Leaves 11 April 1944	—
Otto Hafner	Heer	Hauptmann of the Reserves	Chief of the 4./Grenadier-Regiment 61	23 September 1943	—	—
Wolf Hagemann+	Heer	Oberstleutnant	Commander of the III./Gebirgsjäger-Regiment 139	4 September 1940	Awarded 484th Oak Leaves 4 June 1944	—
Walter Hagen+	Luftwaffe	Major	Gruppenkommandeur of the III./Sturzkampfgeschwader 1 (Note: According to Scherzer as Gruppenkommandeur of the Sturzkampfgruppe I./186.)	21 July 1940	Awarded 77th Oak Leaves 17 February 1942	—
Wilhelm von Hagen	Heer	Hauptmann	Leader of the II./Infanterie-Regiment 267	2 September 1942	—	—
Gottfried Hagena	Luftwaffe	Oberleutnant	Pilot in the 1./Nahaufklärungs-Gruppe 15	17 April 1945	—	—
Johannes Hager	Luftwaffe	Hauptmann	Staffelkapitän in the II./Nachtjagdgeschwader 1 (Note: According to Scherzer as Staffelkapitän of the 2./Nachtjagdgeschwader 1.)	12 March 1945	—	—
Karl Hager	Luftwaffe	Feldwebel	Pilot in the 4./Sturzkampfgeschwader 2 "Immelmann"	29 February 1944*	Killed in flying accident 4 February 1944	—
Andreas Hagl	Luftwaffe	Oberleutnant	Zugführer (platoon leader) in the 2./Fallschirmjäger-Regiment 3	9 July 1941	—	A smiling man wearing a military uniform, peaked cap, and an Iron Cross displayed at the front of his uniform collar.
Adolf Hahlbohm	Heer	Hauptmann	Commander of the II./Grenadier-Regiment 956	8 August 1944	—	—
Constantin Hahm	Luftwaffe	Major	Commander of the II./Fallschirmjäger-Regiment "Hermann Göring"	9 June 1944	—	—
Walther Hahm+	Heer	Oberst	Commander of Infanterie-Regiment 480	15 November 1941	Awarded 676th Oak Leaves 9 December 1944	
Hans "Assi" Hahn+	Luftwaffe	Oberleutnant	Pilot of the 4./Jagdgeschwader 2 "Richthofen"	24 September 1940	Awarded 32nd Oak Leaves 14 August 1941	
Hans von Hahn	Luftwaffe	Hauptmann	Gruppenkommandeur of the I./Jagdgeschwader 3	9 July 1941	—	—
Hans Hahn	Luftwaffe	Leutnant	Pilot in the I./Nachtjagdgeschwader 2 (Note: According to Scherzer as pilot in the 3./Nachtjagdgeschwader 2.)	9 July 1941	—	—
Joachim Hahn	Luftwaffe	Major	Commander of Kampfgruppe 606 (Note: According to Scherzer as Gruppenkommandeur of Küstenfliegergruppe 606.)	21 October 1940	—	—
Hans Hahne	Heer	Oberst	Commander of Infanterie-Regiment 507	10 February 1942	—	—
[Dr.] Josef Haiböck (Note: The brackets around the doctor title [Dr.] denotes that the academic title was attained after the Knight's Cross of the Iron Cross was awarded.)	Luftwaffe	Hauptmann	Gruppenkommandeur of the I./Jagdgeschwader 3 "Udet" (Note: According to Scherzer as Gruppenkommandeur of the I./Jagdgeschwader 3 "Udet" [for his achievements as Staffelkapitän in the I./Jagdgeschwader 52].)	9 June 1944	—	—
Paul Haidle	Luftwaffe	Leutnant	Staffelführer in the III./Schlachtgeschwader 77	16 February 1945	—	—
Horst Hain	Heer	Oberleutnant	Chief of the 3./Panzer-Aufklärungs-Abteilung 23	28 March 1945	—	—
Adolf Hainle	Heer	Oberwachtmeister	Leader of machine gun squadron in the 2./Aufklärungs-Abteilung 5 (Note: According to Scherzer in the 2./Aufklärungs-Abteilung 5.)	22 September 1941	—	—
Richard Haizmann	Luftwaffe	Oberstleutnant im Generalstab (in the General Staff)	Ia (operations officer) in the 9. Flak-Division (motorized)	28 January 1943	—	—
Friedrich-Erdmann von Hake	Heer	Oberst	Commander of Panzer-Regiment 4	23 November 1943	—	—
Hans Hakenholt	Luftwaffe	Hauptmann	Commander of the II./Flak-Regiment 43 (motorized)	9 June 1944	—	—
Theodor Haker	Luftwaffe	Oberleutnant	Staffelkapitän of the 6./Sturzkampfgeschwader 77	29 February 1944	—	—
Heinrich Halbeck (Note: According to Scherzer last name is spelled "Hahlbeck" and the Knight's Cross of the Iron Cross was awarded as Oberleutnant and company chief in Panzergrenadier-Lehr-Regiment 901.)	Waffen-SS	SS-Untersturmführer	Leader of a Kampfgruppe of the V. SS-Gebirgskorps	17 April 1945*	Killed in action 27 November 1944	—
Franz Halder	Heer	General der Artillerie	Chef des Generalstabes des Heeres	27 October 1939	—	A man with short hair wearing glasses and a military uniform.
Hellmuth Hallauer	Heer	Hauptmann	Chief of the 1./Pionier-Bataillon 59 (motorized) (Note: According to Scherzer as chief of the 1./Pionier-Bataillon 59.)	24 June 1941	—	—
Rudolf Hallensleben	Luftwaffe	Major	Geschwaderkommodore of Kampfgeschwader 76	5 November 1943 (Note: According to Scherzer on 29 October 1943.)	—	—
Günter Halm (Note: According to Fellgiebel his name is spelled Günther Halm, while Scherzer spells his name Günter Halm, firstname without the "h".)	Heer	Grenadier	Gunner in the Pakzug (anti tank platoon) in the Stabskompanie/Panzergrenadier-Regiment 104	29 July 1942	—	
Hans Halten	Heer	Unteroffizier	Group leader in the 3./Grenadier-Regiment 43	4 June 1944	—	—
Herbert Hamann	Heer	Major	Leader of Panzer-Feldersatz-Regiment 63	28 February 1945*	Killed in action 11 February 1945	—
Karl Hamberger	Heer	Feldwebel	Deputy leader of the 2./Grenadier-Regiment 62	8 November 1944	—	—
Michael Hamburger	Heer	Feldwebel	Zugführer (platoon leader) in the 4.(MG)/Grenadier-Regiment 957 (Note: According to Scherzer as Zugführer (platoon leader) in the 4./Grenadier-Regiment 957.)	14 April 1945	—	—
Otto Hamburger	Heer	Fahnenjunker-Feldwebel	Leader of the 8.(MG)/Grenadier-Regiment 426 (Note: According to Scherzer as leader of the 8./Grenadier-Regiment 426.)	4 October 1944	—	—
Heinz Hamel	Heer	Oberleutnant of the Reserves	Leader of the 5./Grenadier-Regiment "Feldherrnhalle"	14 February 1945	—	—
Reino Hamer	Luftwaffe	Hauptmann	Commander of the I./Fallschirmjäger-Regiment 7	5 September 1944	—	—
Bernhard Hamester	Luftwaffe	Hauptmann (Note: According to Scherzer as Oberleutnant.)	Staffelkapitän in the III./Sturzkampfgeschwader 3	3 September 1942	—	—
Ernst Hammer	Heer	Generalleutnant	Commander of the 75. Infanterie-Division	20 December 1941	—	—
Ludwig Hammer	Luftwaffe	Leutnant	Pilot and observer in the 4.(H)/Aufklärungs-Gruppe 12	29 October 1943	—	—
Willi Hammerich	Heer	Oberleutnant of the Reserves	Chief of the 4.(MG)/Grenadier-Regiment 501 (Note: According to Scherzer as chief of the 4./Grenadier-Regiment 501.)	9 December 1944	—	—
Karl Hammerl	Luftwaffe	Oberfeldwebel	Pilot in the 1./Jagdgeschwader 52	19 September 1942	—	—
Josef Hammerschmidt	Heer	Leutnant (Note: According to Scherzer as Leutnant of the Reserves.)	Deputy leader of the 8./Panzer-Artillerie-Regiment 74	28 March 1945	—	—
Erich Hammon	Heer	Oberstleutnant	Commander of Panzer-Artillerie-Regiment 119	1 February 1945	—	—
Herbert Hampe	Luftwaffe	Oberfeldwebel	Pilot in the II./Kampfgeschwader 3	5 April 1944	—	—
Desiderius Hampel? (Note: No evidence of the award can be found in the German Federal Archives. Presumably Desiderius Hampel received the Knight's Cross the same day as Karl Liecke and Hans Hanke. Letter from Ernst-Günther Krätschmer to Von Seemen dated 7 August 1980. According to Von Seemen presumably presented by General Maximilian de Angelis. The Order Commission of the Association of Knight's Cross Recipients (AKCR) processed Hampel's case in 1980 and Fellgiebel decided: Knight's Cross yes, 3 May 1945. In his book he noted: "A justification for the presentation was not given". Hampel was member of the AKCR.)	Waffen-SS	SS-Brigadeführer and Generalmajor of the Waffen-SS	Commander of a Kampfgruppe in the 13. Waffen-Gebirgs-Division der SS	3 May 1945	—	—
Josef Hampl	Heer	Oberleutnant of the Reserves	Chief of the 3./Gebirgsjäger-Regiment 85	10 September 1943	—	—
Heinrich Hanbauer	Heer	Oberleutnant	Leader of the 2./Schützen-Regiment 86	7 March 1941	—	—
Erich Handke	Luftwaffe	Fahnenjunker-Feldwebel	Radio/wireless operator in the IV./Nachtjagdgeschwader 1 (Note: According to Scherzer as radio/wireless operator in the Stab III./Nachtjagdgeschwader 1.)	27 July 1944	—	—
Hermann Handke	Heer	Hauptmann	Deputy leader of the II./Jäger-Regiment 49	28 October 1944*	Killed in action 14 September 1944	—
Johann Handler	Heer	Leutnant	Leader of the 1./Grenadier-Regiment 958	14 April 1945	—	—
Wolfgang Hankamer	Luftwaffe	Oberleutnant	Staffelkapitän of the 6./Kampfgeschwader 2 (Note: According to Scherzer as pilot in the II./Kampfgeschwader 2.)	29 October 1944	—	—
Georg Hanke	Luftwaffe	Oberfeldwebel	Pilot in the 6./Kampfgeschwader 76 (Note: According to Scherzer as pilot in the II./Kampfgeschwader 76.)	26 March 1944	—	—
Hans Hanke? (Note: No evidence of the award can be found in the German Federal Archives. Hans Hanke, according to Ernst-Günther Krätschmer, was informed of the award by SS-Brigadeführer Desiderius Hampel and SS-Obersturmbannführer Karl Liecke. Both Hampel and Liecke supposedly received the Knight's Cross the same day—Letter from Krätschmer to Von Seemen dated 7 August 1980. Mr Meentz of the German Federal Archives stated on 20 July 2004 that it cannot be verified that Hanke received the Knight's Cross. According to Von Seemen the Knight's Cross was awarded by General Maximilian de Angelis. The order commission of the Association of Knight's Cross Recipients (AKCR) processed the case in 1980 and Fellgiebel decided: "Knight's Cross yes, 3 May 1945". Nevertheless Fellgiebel noted: No justification for the award.)	Waffen-SS	SS-Obersturmbannführer	Commander of Waffen-Gebirgsjäger-Regiment 28	3 May 1945	—	—
Günther Hannak	Luftwaffe	Leutnant	Pilot in the I./Jagdgeschwader 77	1 July 1942	—	
Erich Hanne	Luftwaffe	Leutnant	Pilot in the 7./Sturzkampfgeschwader 1 (Note: According to Scherzer as pilot in the III./Sturzkampfgeschwader 1.)	13 August 1942	—	—
Heinrich Hannibal	Waffen-SS	SS-Standartenführer and Oberst of the Schupo	Commander of SS-Polizei-Schützen-Regiment 31	23 August 1944	—	—
Felix Hannig	Heer	Major of the Reserves	Commander of the I./Infanterie-Regiment 9	17 September 1941*	Killed in action 23 July 1941	—
Horst Hannig+	Luftwaffe	Leutnant	Pilot in the 6./Jagdgeschwader 54 (Note: According to Scherzer as pilot in the 5./Jagdgeschwader 54.)	9 May 1942	Awarded 364th Oak Leaves 3 January 1944	—
Heinrich Hans	Heer	Oberfeldwebel	Zugführer (platoon leader) in the 3./Grenadier-Regiment 426	5 April 1945	—	—
Christian Hansen	Heer	General der Artillerie	Commanding general of the X. Armeekorps	3 August 1941	—	A man with short hair combed back wearing a military uniform.
Erick-Oskar Hansen	Heer	General der Kavallerie	Commanding general of the LIV. Armeekorps	4 September 1941	—	A man wearing a military uniform, various military decorations including an Iron Cross displayed at the front of his uniform collar.
Hans-Christian Hansen	Luftwaffe	Hauptmann of the Reserves (Note: According to Scherzer as Hauptmann.)	Leader of the II./Fallschirm-Panzergrenadier-Regiment 3 "Hermann Göring"	11 February 1945	—	—
Josef Hansen	Heer	Unteroffizier	Rifle leader in the 6.(MG)/Grenadier-Regiment 317 (Note: According to Scherzer as rifle leader in the 6./Grenadier-Regiment 317.)	15 April 1944*	Died of wounds 2 April 1944	—
Max Hansen+	Waffen-SS	SS-Sturmbannführer	Commander of the II./1. SS-Panzergrenadier-Regiment of the SS-Panzergrenadier-Division "Leibstandarte-SS Adolf Hitler" (Note: According to Scherzer as commander of the II./1. SS-Panzergrenadier-Regiment "Leibstandarte-SS Adolf Hitler".)	28 March 1943	Awarded 835th Oak Leaves 17 April 1945	A man wearing a military uniform, peaked cap and a neck order in the shape of a cross. His cap has an emblem in shape of a human skull and crossed bones.
Walter Hansen	Heer	Oberst	Commander of Grenadier-Regiment 554	16 October 1944	—	—
Jobst Freiherr von Hanstein	Heer	Oberst	Commander of Grenadier-Regiment 109	13 September 1943	—	—
Konrad Hantke	Heer	Unteroffizier	Group leader in Infanterie-Nachrichten-Ersatz- und Ausbildungs-Kompanie 208	28 March 1945	—	—
Erwin Hanusch	Heer	Hauptmann of the Reserves	Commander of the I./Grenadier-Regiment 438	8 August 1944	—	—
Jürgen Harang	Luftwaffe	Oberleutnant	Staffelkapitän in the II./Jagdgeschwader 77	2 February 1945	—	—
Joachim von Harbou	Heer	Hauptmann	Leader of the I./Schützen-Regiment 5	15 November 1941	—	—
Reinhard Hardegen+	Kriegsmarine	Kapitänleutnant	Commander of U-123	23 January 1942	Awarded 89th Oak Leaves 23 April 1942	
Alfred Harden	Heer	Hauptmann	Commander of the II./Panzer-Regiment 29	10 February 1945	—	—
Klaus Freiherr von Hardenberg	Heer	Major	Chief of the 11./Infanterie-Regiment 25 (motorized)	30 November 1940	—	—
Jürgen Harder+	Luftwaffe	Hauptmann (Note: According to Scherzer as Oberleutnant and Staffelführer in the III./Jagdgeschwader 53.)	Staffelkapitän in the III./Jagdgeschwader 53	5 December 1943	Awarded 727th Oak Leaves 1 February 1945	—
Martin Harlinghausen+	Luftwaffe	Major im Generalstab (in the General Staff)	Chief of the Generalstab of the X. Fliegerkorps	4 May 1940	Awarded 8th Oak Leaves 30 January 1941	—
Heinz Harmel+	Waffen-SS	SS-Obersturmbannführer	Commander of SS-Panzergrenadier-Regiment 3 "Deutschland" (Note: According to Scherzer as commander of SS-Panzergrenadier-Regiment "Deutschland".)	31 March 1943	Awarded 296th Oak Leaves 7 September 1943; 116th Swords 15 December 1944	A man wearing a military uniform, peaked cap and a neck order in the shape of a cross. His cap has an emblem in shape of a human skull and crossed bones.
Wilhelm Harms	Heer	Oberstleutnant of the Reserves	Commander of Grenadier-Regiment 390	1 February 1945	—	—
Helmut von Harnack	Heer	Oberleutnant	Leader of the 10./Panzer-Regiment 21	17 January 1942	—	—
Josef Harnoth	Heer	Hauptmann	Commander of the II./Grenadier-Regiment 313	14 February 1945	—	—
Josef Harpe+	Heer	Generalmajor	Commander of the 12. Panzer-Division	13 August 1941	Awarded 55th Oak Leaves 31 December 1941; 36th Swords 15 September 1943	The head of an elderly man, shown from the front. He wears a peaked cap and a military uniform. His facial expression is a determined and confident smile; his eyes looks to the right of the camera.
Horst Harras	Luftwaffe	Oberleutnant	Zugführer (platoon leader) in the I./Flak-Regiment 18 (Note: According to Scherzer on 19 June 1940 as chief of the 8./Flak-Regiment 18.)	14 June 1940	—	—
Hermann Harrendorf	Heer	Hauptmann (Note: According to Scherzer as Hauptmann of the Reserves.)	Commander of the III./Infanterie-Regiment 469	16 February 1942	—	—
[Dr.] Friedrich Harries	Luftwaffe	Oberleutnant	Staffelführer of the 7./Kampfgeschwader 76	24 March 1943	—	—
Kaspar Harscheidt	Heer	Fahnenjunker-Oberfeldwebel	Zugführer (platoon leader) in the 3./Grenadier-Regiment 253	31 August 1943	—	—
Rolf Hart	Luftwaffe	Leutnant	Observer in the 9./Kampfgeschwader 1 "Hindenburg"	15 October 1942	—	—
Wolfgang Hartelt	Luftwaffe	Oberfähnrich	Zugführer (platoon leader) in the 2./Fallschirm-Panzer-Regiment "Hermann Göring"	23 February 1945	—	—
Gustav Harteneck	Heer	General der Kavallerie	Commanding general of the I. Kavallerie-Korps	21 September 1944	—	—
Werner Hartenstein	Kriegsmarine	Korvettenkapitän	Commander of U-156	17 September 1942	—	—
Helmuth Harth	Heer	Unteroffizier	Panzer commander in the 12./Panzer-Regiment 21	22 January 1943	—	—
Lorenz Harthan	Heer	Oberfeldwebel	Pioneer Zugführer (platoon leader) in the 5./Panzer-Aufklärungs-Abteilung 11	12 June 1944	—	—
Walter Hartig	Luftwaffe	Oberleutnant	Chief of the 3./leichte Flak Abteilung 91 (motorized)	4 February 1942	—	—
Alexander von Hartmann	Heer	Generalmajor	Commander of the 71. Infanterie-Division	8 October 1942	—	—
Alfred Hartmann	Heer	Feldwebel	Zugführer (platoon leader) in the 11./Grenadier-Regiment 337	12 March 1943	—	—
Erich Hartmann+	Luftwaffe	Leutnant	Pilot in the 9./Jagdgeschwader 52 (Note: According to Scherzer as pilot in the pilot in the 7./Jagdgeschwader 52.)	29 October 1943	Awarded 420th Oak Leaves 2 March 1944; 75th Swords 2 July 1944; 18th Diamonds 25 August 1944	
Hermann Hartmann	Heer	Feldwebel	Zugführer (platoon leader) in the 3./Pionier-Bataillon 34	31 August 1943	—	—
Leo Hartmann	Heer	Leutnant of the Reserves	Leader in Panzer-Jäger-Abteilung "Breslau"	30 April 1945	—	—
Otto Hartmann	Heer	General der Artillerie	Commanding general of the XXX. Armeekorps	5 August 1940	—	—
Walter Hartmann+	Heer	Oberst	Artilleriekommandeur 140	10 August 1941	Awarded 340th Oak Leaves 30 November 1943; 139th Swords 18 March 1945	—
Werner Hartmann+	Kriegsmarine	Korvettenkapitän	Commander of U-37	9 May 1940	Awarded 645th Oak Leaves 5 November 1944	—
Werner Hartmann	Heer	Hauptmann of the Reserves	Commander of Pionier-Bataillon 8	4 October 1944	—	—
Kurt Hartrampf? (Note: No evidence of the award can be found in the German Federal Archives. According to Ernst-Günther Krätschmer—letter dated on 7 August 1980 to Gerhard von Seemen— the presentation was made in conjunction to the Oak Leaves presentation to Matthias Kleinheisterkamp and was announced via radio transmission on 28 April 1945 from the Führer Headquarters in Berlin to the 9. Armee (9th Army) in the Halbe pocket. The radio transmissions received by the AOK 9 (Armeeoberkommando 9 — high command of the 9th Army) in April 1945 were not retained. All communication to the Führerbunker in Berlin were out of order as of 5AM on 28 April. The order commission of the Association of Knight's Cross Recipients (AKCR) processed Kurt Hartrampf's case in 1980 and decided solely relying on the letter from Krätschmer: "Knight's Cross yes, 28 April 1945", Hartrampf was a member of the AKCR.)	Waffen-SS	SS-Sturmbannführer	Commander of schwere SS-Panzer-Abteilung 502	28 April 1945	—	—
Paul Harttrumpf? (Note: Paul Harttrumpf's nomination by his unit was received by the Heerespersonalamt (HPA—Army Staff Office) on 18 April 1945. There is no file card. Major Joachim Domaschk approved on 19 April. A teleprinter message was sent to Wilhelm Burgdorf on 26 April for presentation to the Führer. The nomination was never finalized and was left unfinished by the end of the war. According to the Association of Knight's Cross Recipients (AKCR) the award was presented in accordance with the Dönitz-decree. This is illegal according to the Deutsche Dienststelle (WASt) and lacks legal justification. The presentation date was assigned by Walther-Peer Fellgiebel.)	Heer	Leutnant	Leader of the 1./Grenadier-Regiment 12	8 May 1945	—	—
Walter Hartz	Heer	Oberfeldwebel	Zugführer (platoon leader) in the 6./Grenadier-Regiment 431	6 February 1944	—	—
Johann Harzenetter? (Note: Johann Harzenetter's nomination by his unit was received by the Heerespersonalamt (HPA—Army Staff Office) on 13 April 1945 and approved by Major Joachim Domaschk on 14 April. A Heerespersonalamt-Verleihungsvorschlag (HPA-VV—Army Staff Office Nomination Recommendation) Nr. 5089 was created and forwarded on 21 April. There is no evidence that the nomination was approved or further processed. According to the Association of Knight's Cross Recipients (AKCR) the award was presented in accordance with the Dönitz-decree. This is illegal according to the Deutsche Dienststelle (WASt) and lacks legal justification. The presentation date was assigned by Walther-Peer Fellgiebel.)	Heer	Hauptmann	Commander of the II./Grenadier-Regiment 331	9 May 1945	—	—
Walter Harzer	Waffen-SS	SS-Obersturmbannführer	Ia (operations officer) of the 9. SS-Panzer-Division "Hohenstaufen"	21 September 1944	—	—
Max Haschberger	Heer	Oberfähnrich	Ordonnanzoffizier (batman) of the I./Grenadier-Regiment 481	27 August 1943	—	—
Wolfgang Hasche	Heer	Hauptmann of the Reserves	Commander of the I./Grenadier-Regiment 987	3 November 1944	—	—
Karl-Günther von Hase	Heer	Major (Note: According to Scherzer as Major im Generalstab (in the General Staff) and Ia (operations officer)/commander of the fortress Schneidemühl.)	General staff officer with the commander of the fortress Schneidemühl (Ia (operations officer) Panzer-Division "Holstein")	12 February 1945	—	Black-and-white portrait of a man with glasses in semi profile wearing a suit and tie.
Hans Haselbach	Luftwaffe	Leutnant	Pilot in the 14.(Eis)/Kampfgeschwader 27 "Boelcke"	12 November 1943	—	—
Günter Hasenbeck	Heer	Oberleutnant	Company leader in the Panzer-Aufklärungs-Abteilung 6	26 August 1943	—	—
Rudolf Hasenpusch? (Note: No evidence of the award can be found in the German Federal Archives. According to Walther-Peer Fellgiebel the presentation was made by Feldmarschall Ferdinand Schörner, who at the time was not authorized to do so. Von Seemen references the history of the division. Also mentioned are exceptional actions and deeds which led to the presentation of the Knight's Cross (e.g. Knight's Cross for Hans Schönebeck on 23 March 1945). Rudolf Hasenputsch is mentioned twice in the history of the division. The chapter "Auseinanderfall der Division-The falling apart of the division" states that "the bridge company (Leutnant Hasenputsch), as a small pocket, returned to the German lines, and secondly in the section listing the Knight's recipients with a vague presentation date of April 1945. The history of the division does not describe the actions nor the presentation. A member of the Association of Knight's Cross Recipients (AKCR), who could not find any evidence in the German Federal Archives regarding the presentation to Hasenputsch, wrote to Fellgiebel asking "Do you happen to have details and documents?". Fellgiebel responded on 6 May 1986 stating that "Hasenputsch, 27 April 1945, is noted under the recipients of Army Group Centre before 3 May 1945, therefore without authorization." Fellgiebel knew that the presentation, even if it occurred, was illegal. The question why Fellgiebel accepted and listed Hasenputsch as a Knight's Cross recipient is answered by the statement "Hasenputsch has been a member of the AKCR since the early beginnings".)	Heer	Leutnant	Leader of Panzer-Brückenkolonne in the Panzer-Pionier-Battalion 16	27 April 1945	—	—
Siegfried Haß	Heer	Generalleutnant	Commander of the 170. Infanterie-Division	18 February 1945	—	—
Frank Hasse	Waffen-SS	SS-Obersturmführer	Leader of the 11./SS-Panzergrenadier-Regiment 1 "Leibstandarte SS Adolf Hitler"	6 August 1944	—	—
Wilhelm Hasse+	Heer	Generalleutnant	Commander of the 30. Infanterie-Division	12 August 1944	Awarded 698th Oak Leaves 14 January 1945	
Kurt Haßel	Heer	Major	Commander of Panzer-Verband 700	17 June 1943	—	—
Friedrich Hauber	Luftwaffe	Hauptmann	Commander of the II./Fallschirmjäger-Regiment 12 (Note: According to Scherzer as commander of the II./Fallschirmjäger-Sturm-Regiment (12).)	5 September 1944	—	—
Friedrich-Wilhelm Hauck	Heer	Generalleutnant	Commander of the 305. Infanterie-Division	11 June 1944	—	
Kurt Haude	Heer	Oberleutnant of the Reserves	Chief of the 6./Panzergrenadier-Regiment 112	24 November 1943*	Killed in action 18 October 1943	—
Bruno Ritter von Hauenschild+	Heer	Oberst	Commander of the 4. Panzer-Brigade	25 August 1941	Awarded 129th Oak Leaves 27 September 1942	—
Ulrich von Hauff	Heer	Hauptmann	Commander of the III./Jäger-Regiment 75	31 January 1944*	Killed in action 3 January 1944	—
Arthur Hauffe	Heer	Generalleutnant	Commander of the 46. Infanterie-Division	25 July 1943	—	—
Helmut Haugk	Luftwaffe	Oberfeldwebel	Pilot in the 9./Zerstörergeschwader 26 "Horst Wessel" (Note: According to Scherzer as pilot in the 9./Zerstörergeschwader 26.)	21 December 1942	—	A smiling man wearing a military uniform and an Iron Cross displayed at the front of his uniform collar.
Werner Haugk	Luftwaffe	Fahnenjunker-Oberfeldwebel	Pilot in the 4./Zerstörergeschwader 76 (Note: According to Scherzer as pilot in the Stab./Zerstörergeschwader 76.)	8 August 1944	—	—
Edgar Haukelt? (Note: According to Scherzer name is spelled Edgar Hauckelt and no evidence of the award can be found in the German Federal Archives. According to Krätschmer—letter dated on 7 August 1980 to Von Seemen— the presentation was made in conjunction to the Oak Leaves presentation to Matthias Kleinheisterkamp and was announced via radio transmission on 28 April 1945 from the Führer Headquarters in Berlin to the 9. Armee (9th Army) in the Halbe pocket. The radio transmissions received by the AOK 9 (Armeeoberkommando 9 — high command of the 9th Army) in April 1945 were not retained. All communication to the Führerbunker in Berlin were out of order as of 5AM on 28 April. The order commission of the Association of Knight's Cross Recipients (AKCR) processed Hauckelt's case in 1980 and decided solely relying on the letter from Krätschmer: "Knight's Cross yes, 28 April 1945".)	Waffen-SS	SS-Obersturmführer	Chief of the 1./SS-Jagdpanzer-Abteilung 561	28 April 1945	—	—
Helmut Haun	Heer	Oberleutnant	Regiment adjutant in the Infanterie-Regiment 77 (Note: According to Scherzer as adjutant in the Infanterie-Regiment 77.)	8 August 1941	—	—
Karl Haupt	Luftwaffe	Oberfeldwebel	Pilot in the 8./Kampfgeschwader 3 "Lützow"	3 February 1943	—	—
Hans Hauptmann	Heer	Hauptmann	Leader of Kradschützen-Bataillon 55	15 March 1943	—	—
Heinrich Hauptmann	Heer	Hauptmann	Commander of the III./Panzergrenadier-Regiment 115	20 November 1942	—	—
Georg Haus	Heer	Oberst	Commander of Grenadier-Regiment 55	12 February 1944	—	—
Eduard Hauser+	Heer	Oberst	Commander of Panzer-Regiment 25	4 December 1941	Awarded 376th Oak Leaves 26 January 1944	—
Hans Hauser? (Note: No evidence of the award can be found in the German Federal Archives. The award was unlawfully presented by SS-Oberstgruppenführer Sepp Dietrich. The date is taken from the announcement made by the 6. SS-Panzerarmee. Hauser was a member of the Association of Knight's Cross Recipients (AKCR).)	Waffen-SS	SS-Sturmbannführer and Major of the Schutzpolizei	Commander of the I./SS-Panzergrenadier-Regiment 4 "Der Führer"	6 May 1945	—	—
Hansjörg Hauser	Heer	Hauptmann	Commander of the II./Grenadier-Regiment 35 (motorized)	17 August 1943	—	A man wearing a military uniform, peaked cap, and an Iron Cross displayed at the front of his uniform collar.
Hellmuth Hauser	Luftwaffe	Hauptmann	Staffelkapitän in the I./Kampfgeschwader 51	23 December 1942	—	—
Paul Freiherr von Hauser+	Heer	Hauptmann	Commander of Kradschützen-Bataillon 61	25 January 1943	Awarded 635th Oak Leaves 28 October 1944	—
Karl Hausmann	Heer	Oberfeldwebel	Leader of the 3./Jäger-Regiment 28	15 May 1942	—	—
Arthur Haussels	Heer	Major	Commander of the II./Gebirgsjäger-Regiment 139	4 September 1940	—	—
Paul Hausser+	Waffen-SS	SS-Gruppenführer and Generalleutnant of the Waffen-SS	Commander of SS-Division "Reich"	8 August 1941	Awarded 261st Oak Leaves 28 July 1943; 90th Swords 26 August 1944	A man in semi profile wearing a military uniform, peaked cap and a neck order in the shape of a cross. His cap has an emblem in shape of a human skull and crossed bones.
Erich Haut	Heer	Hauptmann of the Reserves	Commander of the I./Panzergrenadier-Regiment 86	10 May 1943	—	—
Hans Havik? (Note: The nomination by his unit was received by the Heerespersonalamt (HPA—Army Staff Office) via teleprinter on 6 April 1945. This can be verified in the book "Verliehene Ritterkreuze" (Awarded Knight Crosses) and file card. A HPA nomination was never created or was not retained and according to the file card the nomination was numbered Nr. 5023 and forwarded for further processing. The file card indicates no further information. The presentation date according to Ernst-Günther Krätschmer was the 6 May 1945. Mr Meentz of the German Federal Archives stated on 20 July 2004 that it cannot be verified that Hans Havik (Johann Havik according to Scherzer) received the Knight's Cross. The presentation date 9 May 1945 was assigned by Walther-Peer Fellgiebel.)	Waffen-SS	SS-Untersturmführer	Zugführer (platoon leader) in the 1./SS-Polizei-Panzer-Abteilung 4	9 May 1945	—	—
Heinrich Hawelka	Heer	Oberleutnant of the Reserves	Adjutant in the III./Grenadier-Regiment 413	22 January 1944	—	—
Heinrich Hax+	Heer	Oberst	Leader of the 8. Panzer-Division	8 March 1945	Awarded (855th) Oak Leaves 30 April 1945	—
Wilhelm Haxter	Heer	Oberfeldwebel	Leader of the bicycle platoon in the Stabskompanie/Grenadier-Regiment 691	14 August 1943	—	—
Elmershaus von Haxthausen	Kriegsmarine	Kapitänleutnant	Chief of the 2. Artillerieträger-Flottille	3 July 1944	—	—
Ernst Hechler	Kriegsmarine	Korvettenkapitän	Commander of U-870	21 January 1945	—	—
Dietrich Hecht	Heer	Leutnant of the Reserves	Leader of the 5./Grenadier-Regiment 666	27 October 1943	—	—
Max Hecht	Luftwaffe	Major	Commander of Flak-Regiment 135 (motorized)	7 March 1942	—	—
Reinhold Heckelmann	Heer	Oberleutnant	Ordonnanzoffizier (batman) in Grenadier-Regiment 1091	11 March 1945	—	—
Hans Hecker	Heer	Oberstleutnant	Commander of Pionier-Bataillon 29 (motorized)	5 August 1940	—	—
Alfred Heckmann	Luftwaffe	Oberfeldwebel	Pilot in the 4./Jagdgeschwader 3 "Udet" (Note: According to Scherzer as pilot in the 5./Jagdgeschwader 3 "Udet".)	19 September 1942	—	—
Fritz Hedderich	Heer	Oberfeldwebel	Zugführer (platoon leader) in the 3./Grenadier-Regiment 487	28 December 1943	—	—
Eberhard Heder	Waffen-SS	SS-Hauptsturmführer	Leader of SS-Panzer-Pionier-Bataillon 5 "Wiking" (Note: According to Scherzer as leader of SS-Panzer-Pionier-Bataillon 5.)	18 November 1944	—	—
Karl Heer	Heer	Hauptmann	Leader of the I./Volks-Artillerie-Regiment 178 (Note: According to Scherzer as leader of the I./Artillerie-Regiment 178.)	30 April 1945*	Killed in action 22 March 1945	—
Wolfgang Heesemann	Heer	Oberst	Commander of Panzergrenadier-Regiment "Großdeutschland"	17 February 1945*	Killed in action 6 February 1945	—
Paul te Heesen	Heer	Hauptmann	Commander of Panzer-Abteilung 106 "Feldherrnhalle" (Note: According to Scherzer as commander of Panzer-Abteilung 2106.)	13 January 1945*	Killed in action 9 January 1945	—
Balthasar Hefter	Heer	Oberfeldwebel	Zugführer (platoon leader) in the 3./Panzer-Abteilung 18	8 October 1943*	Died of wounds 28 July 1943 (Note: According to Scherzer on 27 July 1943.)	—
Otto Heger	Heer	Hauptmann of the Reserves	Commander of the II./Jäger-Regiment 227	21 September 1944	—	—
Rudolf Heger	Heer	Oberleutnant	Leader of the 4./Artillerie-Regiment 96	20 January 1943	—	—
Rudolf Hegewald	Heer	Feldwebel	Zugführer (platoon leader) in the 5./Grenadier-Regiment 428	28 October 1944	—	—
Hermann Hehmeyer	Heer	Hauptmann	Commander of the III./Grenadier-Regiment 216	10 December 1942	—	—
Ernst Heibel	Heer	Unteroffizier	Group leader in Grenadier-Regiment 1092	17 April 1945 (Note: According to Scherzer on 11 April 1945.)	—	—
Josef Heichele+	Heer	Hauptmann	Leader of Divisions-Füsilier-Bataillon (A.A.) 129 (Note: According to Scherzer as leader of Divisions-Füsilier-Bataillon 129.)	31 January 1944	Awarded 742nd Oak Leaves 17 February 1945	—
Wilhelm Heidbrink	Heer	Major of the Reserves	Leader of Grenadier-Regiment 435	6 March 1944	—	—
Friedrich Heidlberg	Heer	Hauptmann	Commanded to general staff training in the Stab of the 336. Infanterie-Division	14 May 1944*	Killed in action 13 April 1944	—
Walter von der Heiden	Heer	Hauptmann	Commander of Pionier-Bataillon 150	11 March 1945	—	—
Fritz Heidenreich	Luftwaffe	Oberleutnant	Observer in the 1.(F)/Aufklärungs-Gruppe 120 (Note: According to Scherzer as observer in the Aufklärungsstaffel 1.(F)/120.)	3 June 1941	—	—
Otto Heidkämper	Heer	Oberst im Generalstab (in the General Staff)	Chief of the general staff of the XXIV. Panzerkorps	8 February 1943	—	—
Kurt Heidrich	Luftwaffe	Oberleutnant	Leader of the 5./gem. Flak-Abteilung 314 (motorized) (Note: According to Scherzer as leader of the 5./gem. Flak-Abteilung 314 (deployable).)	24 October 1944	—	—
Manfred Heidrich	Heer	Oberleutnant of the Reserves	Chief of the 2./Grenadier-Regiment 232	5 April 1945*	Killed in action 4 February 1945	—
Richard Heidrich+	Luftwaffe	Oberst	Commander of Fallschirmjäger-Regiment 3	14 June 1941	Awarded 382nd Oak Leaves 5 February 1944; 55th Swords 25 March 1944	A man wearing a military uniform with an Iron Cross displayed at the front of his uniform collar.
Joachim Heidschmidt	Heer	Major	Leader of Grenadier-Regiment 509	27 August 1944	—	—
Hans Heidtmann	Kriegsmarine	Kapitänleutnant	Commander of U-559	12 April 1943	—	—
Alfred Heiduschka	Luftwaffe	Feldwebel	Pilot in the 3./Schlachtgeschwader 2 "Immelmann" (Note: According to Scherzer as pilot in the I./Schlachtgeschwader 2 "Immelmann".)	8 August 1944	—	—
Hubertus-Maria Ritter von Heigl	Heer	Oberstleutnant	Commander of Pionier-Bataillon 70 (motorized)	13 January 1942	—	—
Hans Heiland? (Note: Hans Heiland's nomination by his unit was received by the Heerespersonalamt (HPA—Army Staff Office) on 12 April 1945 via teleprinter message. There is no file card in the archives. The book "Verliehene Ritterkreuze" (Awarded Knight Crosses) states an entry date of 12 April 1945. In the comment field is a short entry "follow-up on 10 May". Scherzer speculates that the approvals of the command chain were missing and had to be requested just like in many similar cases. The nomination was to be presented again to Major Joachim Domaschk on 10 May. The nomination was never finalized and was left unfinished by the end of the war. According to the Association of Knight's Cross Recipients (AKCR) the award was presented in accordance with the Dönitz-decree. This is illegal according to the Deutsche Dienststelle (WASt) and lacks legal justification. The presentation date was assigned by Walther-Peer Fellgiebel. Heiland was a member of the AKCR.)	Heer	Leutnant	Leader of the 5./Panzergrenadier-Regiment 126	9 May 1945	—	—
Karl Heiland	Heer	Hauptmann (Note: According to Scherzer as Hauptmann of the Reserves.)	Leader of the III./Grenadier-Regiment 55	27 October 1943	—	—
Gerhard Heilbronn	Heer	Hauptmann	Leader of the II./Schützen-Regiment 7	12 April 1942	—	A man holding a cigar in his left hand, wearing a military uniform and an Iron Cross displayed at the front of his uniform collar.
Ludwig Heilmann+	Luftwaffe	Major	Commander of the III./Fallschirmjäger-Regiment 3	14 June 1941	Awarded 412th Oak Leaves 2 March 1944; 67th Swords 15 May 1944	A man wearing a military uniform with an Iron Cross displayed at the front of his uniform collar.
Nicolaus Heilmann	Waffen-SS	SS-Oberführer	Commander of the 15. Waffen-Grenadier-Division of the SS (Note: According to Scherzer as commander of the 15. Waffen-Grenadier-Division of the SS (lett. Nr. 1).)	23 August 1944	—	—
Otto Heilmann	Heer	Oberst	Commander of Grenadier-Regiment 671	9 June 1944	—	—
Ferdinand Heim	Heer	Generalmajor	Commander of the 14. Panzer-Division	30 August 1942	—	A man wearing a military uniform, peaked cap, and an Iron Cross displayed at the front of his uniform collar.
Herbert Heim	Heer	Unteroffizier	Truppführer (team leader) in the 1./Grenadier-Regiment 116	3 July 1944	—	—
Walther Heim	Heer	Hauptmann	Leader of Panzer-Jäger-Abteilung 10 (motorized) (Note: According to Scherzer as leader of Panzer-Jäger-Abteilung 10.)	5 December 1943	—	—
Heinrich Heimann	Waffen-SS	SS-Hauptsturmführer	Commander of SS-Sturmgeschütz-Abteilung 1 "Leibstandarte SS Adolf Hitler" (Note: According to Scherzer as commander of SS-Sturmgeschütz-Abteilung 1.)	23 February 1944	—	—
Gerhard Hein+	Heer	Unteroffizier	Zugführer (platoon leader) in the 10./Infanterie-Regiment 209	3 September 1940	Awarded 120th Oak Leaves 6 September 1942	—
Kurt Hein	Heer	Unteroffizier	Geschützführer (gun layer) in the 1./Panzer-Jäger-Abteilung 12	18 December 1944	—	—
Willy Hein	Waffen-SS	SS-Obersturmführer of the Reserves	Chief of the 2./SS-Panzer-Regiment 5 "Wiking" (Note: According to Scherzer as chief of the 2./SS-Panzer-Regiment 5.)	4 May 1944	—	—
Josef Heindl+	Heer	Hauptmann of the Reserves	Commander of the I./Grenadier-Regiment 199 "List"	9 February 1943	Awarded 328th Oak Leaves 18 November 1943	—
Hans Heindorff	Luftwaffe	Oberleutnant	Pilot and observer in the Fern-Aufklärungs-Gruppe des OBdL (Note: According to Scherzer on 29 October 1942 as pilot and observer in the 3./Aufklärungs-Gruppe des OBdL.)	21 October 1942	—	—
Werner Heine	Heer	Major	Commander of the I./Grenadier-Regiment 499	1 May 1943	—	—
Anton Heinemann	Luftwaffe	Fahnenjunker-Feldwebel	Radio/wireless operator in the I./Nachtjagdgeschwader 2	17 April 1945	—	—
Engelbert Heiner	Luftwaffe	Oberfeldwebel	Pilot in the 9./Kampfgeschwader 27 "Boelcke" (Note: According to Scherzer as pilot in the III./Kampfgeschwader 27 "Boelcke".)	9 December 1942	—	—
Martin Heinke	Heer	Oberleutnant of the Reserves	Chief of the 1./Panzer-Zerstörer-Abteilung 156	28 February 1945	—	—
Hugo Heinkel	Heer	Oberfeldwebel	Zugtruppführer (platoon HQ section leader) in the 15./Grenadier-Regiment 361 (motorized)	16 November 1944	—	—
Herbert Heinrich	Heer	Oberleutnant	Chief of the 3./Artillerie-Regiment 267	15 March 1944	—	—
Horst Heinrich	Heer	Oberleutnant	Leader of the 2./Gebirgs-Pionier-Bataillon 83	30 December 1943	—	—
Otto Heinrich	Luftwaffe	Feldwebel	Pilot in the 3./Schnellkampfgeschwader 10	20 July 1944*	Killed in action 22 May 1944	—
Willi Heinrich	Heer	Leutnant	Leader of the 1./Panzer-Abteilung Führer-Grenadier-Brigade	9 December 1944	—	—
Conrad-Oskar Heinrichs (Note: According to Fellgiebel his name is spelled Conrad-Oskar Heinrichs, while Scherzer spells his name Konrad-Oskar Heinrichs, firstname with a "K" and not "C".)	Heer	Oberst	Commander of Infanterie-Regiment 24	13 September 1941	—	—
Erich Heinrichs	Luftwaffe	Oberleutnant	Pilot in the II./Kampfgeschwader 54	22 June 1941* (Note: According to Scherzer on 24 June 1941.)	Killed in action 28 May 1941	—
Josef Heinrichs	Heer	Feldwebel	Zugführer (platoon leader) in the 2./Grenadier-Regiment 328	10 June 1943	—	—
Gotthard Heinrici+	Heer	General der Infanterie	Commanding general of the XXXXIII. Armeekorps	18 September 1941	Awarded 333rd Oak Leaves 24 November 1943; 136th Swords 3 March 1945	Black-and-white portrait of a balding older man wearing a military uniform with an Iron Cross displayed at his neck.
Hans-Joachim Heinrici	Heer	Hauptmann	Leader of the II./Grenadier-Regiment 431	14 February 1945	—	—
Kurt Heintz	Luftwaffe	Hauptmann	Staffelkapitän of the 9.(K)/Lehrgeschwader 1	17 October 1942	—	—
Erich Heintze	Luftwaffe	Unteroffizier	Geschützführer (gun layer) in the 3./Flak-Regiment 33 (motorized) in the DAK (Note: According to Scherzer as Geschützführer (gun layer) in the 3./Flak-Regiment (motorized) 33.)	7 March 1942	—	—
Horst Heinze	Heer	Oberleutnant	Leader of the 2./Pionier-Bataillon 169	30 September 1944	—	—
Otto Heinze	Heer	Oberfeldwebel	Zugführer (platoon leader) in the 2./Pionier-Bataillon 3 (motorized)	6 November 1942	—	—
Georg Heinzmann	Heer	Oberfeldwebel	Zugführer (platoon leader) in the 12.(MG)/Infanterie-Regiment 42 (Note: According to Scherzer as Zugführer (platoon leader) in the 12./Infanterie-Regiment 42.)	3 May 1942	—	—
Hanns Heise	Luftwaffe	Hauptmann	Gruppenkommandeur of the IV./Kampfgeschwader 76 (Note: According to Scherzer as Gruppenkommandeur of the I./Kampfgeschwader 76.)	3 September 1942	—	—
Johannes Heisel	Heer	Oberleutnant	Chief of the 2./Panzer-Jäger-Abteilung 161	9 December 1944	—	—
Gustav Heistermann von Ziehlberg? (Note: Gustav Heistermann von Ziehlberg, in connection with the 20 July plot, a failed attempt to assassinate Adolf Hitler, was sentenced to death by the Reichskriegsgericht on 21 November 1944 and executed on 2 February 1945. The dishonourable discharge deprived him of all honours, ranks and orders.)	Heer	Generalleutnant	Commander of the 28. Jäger-Division	27 July 1944	—	—
Hermann Heitmann	Heer	Hauptmann of the Reserves	Leader of the III./Artillerie-Regiment 241	15 October 1942	—	—
Walter Heitz+	Heer	General der Artillerie	Commanding general of the VIII. Armeekorps	4 September 1940	Awarded 156th Oak Leaves 21 December 1942	A man with short hair combed back wearing a military uniform.
Albert Hektor	Waffen-SS	SS-Oberscharführer	Zugführer (platoon leader) in the 7./SS-Freiwilligen-Panzergrenadier-Regiment 24 "Danmark" (Note: According to Scherzer as Zugführer (platoon leader) in the 7./SS-Panzergrenadier-Regiment 24 "Danmark".)	23 August 1944	—	—
Joachim Helbig+	Luftwaffe	Hauptmann	Staffelkapitän of the 4.(K)/Lehrgeschwader 1	24 November 1940	Awarded 64th Oak Leaves 16 January 1942; 20th Swords 28 September 1942	
Felix Held	Luftwaffe	Leutnant	Zugführer (platoon leader) in the 1./Ersatz-Bataillon Luftwaffen-Kommando Don (Note: According to Scherzer as Zugführer (platoon leader) in the 1./Flieger-Ersatz-Bataillon Luftwaffen-Kommando Don.)	3 April 1943	—	—
Heinrich Held	Heer	Oberfeldwebel	Zugführer (platoon leader) in the 2./Füssilier-Regiment 22	12 December 1944	—	—
Johann Heldmann	Heer	Oberstleutnant	Commander of Grenadier-Regiment 53	17 March 1945	—	—
Max Heldt	Heer	Hauptmann of the Reserves	Leader of the II./Grenadier-Regiment 353	16 November 1944	—	—
Heinz Helemann	Heer	Oberleutnant of the Reserves	Leader of the 7./Grenadier-Regiment 361 (motorized)	5 September 1944	—	—
Ernst-Eberhard Hell+	Heer	General der Artillerie	Commanding general of the VII. Armeekorps	1 February 1943	Awarded 487th Oak Leaves 4 June 1944	
Richard Heller	Luftwaffe	Oberfeldwebel	Pilot in the III./Zerstörergeschwader 26 "Horst Wessel"	21 August 1941	—	A man wearing a military uniform, side cap, various military decorations including an Iron Cross displayed at the front of his uniform collar.
Siegfried Heller	Heer	Hauptmann	Chief of the 1./Pionier-Bataillon 371	25 July 1942	—	—
Vollrath von Hellermann	Heer	Oberstleutnant	Commander of Panzergrenadier-Regiment 21	21 November 1942	—	—
Erich Hellmann	Luftwaffe	Leutnant	Leader of the 1./Fallschirmjäger-Regiment 3	6 October 1944 (Note: According to Scherzer on 30 September 1944.)	—	A man wearing a military uniform, field cap and various military decorations.
Paul Hellmann	Kriegsmarine	Kapitän der Handelsmarine (Captain of the Merchant Navy holding the military rank of Oberleutnant zur See of the Reserves)	Captain of Blockadebrecher (blockade runner) Motorschiff "Osorno" (Note: According to Scherzer as captain of MS "Osorno" (Blockadebrecher (blockade runner)).)	6 January 1944	—	—
Johannes Hellmers	Waffen-SS	SS-Obersturmführer of the Reserves	Chief of the 6./SS-Freiwilligen-Panzergrenadier-Regiment 49 "De Ruyter" (Note: According to Scherzer as chief of the 6./SS-Freiwilligen-Panzergrenadier-Regiment 49 "De Ruiter".)	5 March 1945	—	—
Günther Hellmich	Heer	Oberleutnant	Leader of the 2./Sturmgeschütz-Abteilung 270	20 December 1943	—	—
Heinz Hellmich	Heer	Generalleutnant	Commander of the 243. Infanterie-Division	2 September 1944*	Killed in action 17 June 1944	—
Hans-Jürgen Hellriegel	Kriegsmarine	Kapitänleutnant	Commander of U-543	3 February 1944	—	—
Karl Helmer	Heer	Leutnant	Ordonnanzoffizier (batman) of the II./Gebirgsjäger-Regiment 14	5 November 1942	—	—
Paul Helmich	Heer	Hauptmann of the Reserves	Commander of the I./Grenadier-Regiment 94	4 October 1944	—	—
Hans Helmling	Heer	Hauptmann of the Reserves	Commander of the II./Grenadier-Regiment 480	13 September 1943	—	—
Götz Helms	Heer	Major	Commander of the I./Infanterie-Regiment 695	14 September 1942*	Killed in action 28 July 1942	—
Alfred Hemmann	Heer	Oberstleutnant	Commander of Infanterie-Regiment 426	21 August 1941	—	—
Hermann Hemmer	Luftwaffe	Leutnant	Pilot in the 3.(F)/Aufklärungs-Gruppe 122 (Note: According to Scherzer as pilot in the Aufklärungsstaffel 3.(F)/122.)	19 September 1942	—	—
Wilhelm Hemmer	Heer	Hauptmann of the Reserves zur Verwendung (for disposition)	Leader of the 2./Feldzeug-Bataillon 16	18 July 1943	—	—
Erwin Hemmerich	Heer	Hauptmann	Commander of Pionier-Bataillon 326	28 March 1945	—	—
[Dr.] Adolf Hempel	Heer	Hauptmann	Chief of the Stabs-Batterie/Flak-Lehr-Regiment (motorized) (Note: According to Scherzer as chief of the 8./Flak-Lehr-Regiment (motorized).)	30 December 1942	—	—
Alfred Hempel	Heer	Leutnant of the Reserves	Battalion leader with fortress commander Kolberg (Pommern) (Note: According to Scherzer as leader battalion Hempel/Abschnitt Mitte in the fortress Kolberg.)	30 April 1945	—	—
Heinrich Hendricks	Heer	Unteroffizier	Panzer driver in the 9./Panzer-Regiment 33	26 March 1943	—	—
Wolfgang Henger	Heer	Oberst	Commander of Artillerie-Regiment 21	17 March 1945	—	—
Georg Ritter von Hengl	Heer	Oberstleutnant	Commander of the Gebirgsjäger-Regiment 137	25 August 1941	—	Von Hengel at Petsamo.
Max Hengst	Luftwaffe	Oberfeldwebel	Pilot in the 2./Transportgeschwader 3	9 June 1944	—	—
Friedrich Hengstler	Heer	Oberfeldwebel	Zugführer (platoon leader) in the 3./Gebirgsjäger-Regiment 98	12 September 1941	—	—
[Dr.] Richard Hengstler? (Note: Richard Hengstler's second version of the nomination by his unit was sent to the Oberkommando des Heeres/Heerespersonalamt P 5 (OKH/HPA P 5—Army Staff Office of the Supreme High Command of the German Army) on 6 April 1945 via the command chain of Heeresgruppe H and OB West. Major Joachim Domaschk received this nomination on 26 April 1945 and forwarded it on 30 April to the responsible Luftwaffepersonalamt (LPA—Air Force Staff Office). The first version of the nomination was sent by the Heeresgruppe H to the Fallschirm AOK 1 on 6 April, which arrived via the command chain at the LPA on 24 April. The LPA sent this nomination with a courier to the adjutancy of the Reichsmarschall on 25 April and requested "Please present to the Reichsmarschall". Göring had been under arrest by the SS on the Obersalzberg since 23 April, this was evidently unknown to the LPA. Therefore the courier couldn't reach him. General Rudolf Meister, who had been authorized to make presentations of Knight's Cross on 28 April, decided against Hengstler and rejected his nomination. The non-contemporary file card states: "rejected ... Meister, General der Flieger and chief of the Luftwaffe PA 28 April 1945 see German Cross in Gold file card". Scherzer assumes that Hengstler received the German Cross instead. The presentation date stated by Walther-Peer Fellgiebel is that of the rejection note.)	Luftwaffe	Hauptmann	Chief of the 1./Fallschirm-Sturmgeschütz-Brigade 12	28 April 1945	—	—
Fritz Henke	Waffen-SS	SS-Oberscharführer	Zugführer (platoon leader) in the 3./SS-Sturmgeschütz-Abteilung 1 "Leibstandarte SS Adolf Hitler" (Note: According to Scherzer as Zugführer (platoon leader) in the 3./SS-Sturmgeschütz-Abteilung 1.)	12 February 1944	—	—
Fritz Henke	Heer	Oberfeldwebel	Zugführer (platoon leader) in the 4./Grenadier-Regiment 306	15 May 1944	—	—
Günther Henke	Heer	Leutnant	Zugführer (platoon leader) in the 7./Reiter-Regiment 41	6 October 1944	—	—
Karl Henke	Heer	Oberst	Commander of Pionier-Landungs-Regiment 770 (motorized) (Note: According to Scherzer as commander of Pionier-Landungs-Regiment Stab (motorized) 770.)	4 August 1943	—	—
Max Henke	Heer	Stabsfeldwebel	Zugführer (platoon leader) in the 1./Panzer-Abteilung 118	26 December 1944	—	—
Werner Henke+	Kriegsmarine	Oberleutnant zur See zur Verwendung (for disposition)	Commander of U-515	17 December 1942	Awarded 257th Oak Leaves 4 July 1943	Black-and-white portrait of a man wearing a military uniform, white shirt with an Iron Cross displayed at his neck.
Hans Henkenschuh	Heer	Feldwebel	Zugführer (platoon leader) in the 7./Grenadier-Regiment 390	10 September 1944	—	—
Hermann Henle	Heer	Hauptmann	Leader of the II./Werfer-Regiment 70 (Note: According to Scherzer as leader of the II./Werfer-Regiment 70 (for achievements as leader of the II./Grenadier-Regiment 99.)	19 September 1943	—	—
Rudolf Henne	Luftwaffe	Hauptmann	Staffelkapitän of the 9./Kampfgeschwader 51	12 April 1942	—	—
Walter Hennecke	Kriegsmarine	Konteradmiral	Sea commander Normandy	26 June 1944	—	—
Konrad Hennemann	Luftwaffe	Leutnant	Pilot in the 1./Kampfgeschwader 26	3 September 1942*	Killed in action 4 July 1942	—
Hermann Hennicke	Heer	Oberstleutnant	Commander of Infanterie-Regiment 37 (Note: According to Scherzer as commander of Infanterie-Regiment 57.)	21 August 1941	—	—
Heinrich Hennig	Heer	Oberfeldwebel	Zugführer (platoon leader) in the Stabskompanie/Füssilier-Regiment 22	9 June 1944	—	—
Horst Henning	Luftwaffe	Oberfeldwebel	Pilot in the 1./Kampfgeschwader 77	22 May 1942	—	
Eberhard Hennings	Luftwaffe	Hauptmann	Staffelkapitän of the 1./Kampfgeschwader 4 "General Wever"	14 May 1942	—	—
Walter Henrich	Heer	Oberstleutnant	Commander of Panzergrenadier-Regiment 40	8 February 1943	—	—
Friedrich-Karl Henrici	Heer	Hauptmann	Commander of the II./Panzergrenadier-Regiment 13	14 April 1943	—	—
Sigfrid Henrici+	Heer	Generalleutnant	Commander of the 16. Infanterie-Division (motorized)	13 October 1941	Awarded 350th Oak Leaves 9 December 1943	—
Gerhard Hensel	Heer	Oberfeldwebel	Zugführer (platoon leader) in the 2./Panzer-Regiment 15	26 December 1941	—	—
Herbert Hensel	Heer	Hauptmann	Commander of Panzer-Füsilier-Bataillon of the Führer-Grenadier-Brigade	5 March 1945	—	—
Walter Henssler	Heer	Oberleutnant of the Reserves	Regiment adjutant in Panzergrenadier-Regiment 126 (Note: According to Scherzer as adjutant in Panzergrenadier-Regiment 126.)	8 August 1944	—	—
Erwin Hentschel	Luftwaffe	Oberfeldwebel	Radio operator in the III./Sturzkampfgeschwader 2 "Immelmann"	25 November 1943	—	—
Otto Hentschel	Heer	Feldwebel	Zugführer (platoon leader) in the 8.(MG)/Infanterie-Regiment 418 (Note: According to Scherzer as Zugführer (platoon leader) in the 8./Infanterie-Regiment 418.)	18 September 1942	—	—
Otto Hentschel	Heer	Hauptmann	Deputy commander of the leichte (light) Flak-Abteilung 94	9 June 1944	—	—
Walter Hentschel	Heer	Oberleutnant	Leader of the II./Grenadier-Regiment 1095	31 October 1944	—	—
Wilhelm Henz	Heer	Leutnant (Note: According to Scherzer as Leutnant des Beurlaubtenstandes (of the reserve status).)	Leader of the 2./Kradschützen-Bataillon 29	8 August 1941	—	—
Albert Henze+	Heer	Oberst	Commander of Panzergrenadier-Regiment 110	15 January 1944	Awarded 709th Oak Leaves 21 January 1945	—
Karl Henze+	Luftwaffe	Oberleutnant	Staffelkapitän of the 1./Sturzkampfgeschwader 77	15 July 1942	Awarded 481st Oak Leaves 20 May 1944	
Richard Henze+	Heer	Major of the Reserves	Commander of the II./Infanterie-Regiment 518	2 October 1942	Awarded 703rd Oak Leaves 18 January 1945	—
Wilhelm Herb	Heer	Hauptmann	Commander of the I./Infanterie-Regiment 517	10 September 1942	—	—
Wilhelm Herb	Heer	Oberstleutnant of the Reserves	Commander of Grenadier-Regiment 380	12 August 1944	—	—
Josef Herbert	Heer	Leutnant	Leader of the 7./Grenadier-Regiment 289	24 December 1944	—	—
Erhard Herbst	Luftwaffe	Oberfeldwebel	Zugführer (platoon leader) in the II./Fallschirm-Panzergrenadier-Regiment "Hermann Göring"	26 March 1945 (Note: According to Scherzer exact date is unknown, stated is sometime 1945.)	—	—
Josef Herbst	Heer	Oberleutnant of the Reserves	Leader of the II./Füsilier-Regiment "Großdeutschland"	30 September 1943	—	—
Maximilian von Herff	Heer	Oberst	Leader of Kampfgruppe "von Herff" (Schützen-Regiment 115) in the DAK (Note: According to Scherzer as commander of Kampfgruppe "von Herff" (Schützen-Regiment 115).)	13 June 1941	—	—
Heinz Herfurth	Heer	Major	Commander of the II./Grenadier-Regiment 189	16 April 1944	—	—
Otto Herfurth? (Note: Otto Herfurth, in connection with the 20 July plot, a failed attempt to assassinate Adolf Hitler, was deprived of all honours, ranks and orders and dishonourably discharged from the Heer on 14 August 1944. The civilian Herfurth was sentenced to death by the Volksgerichtshof on 29 September 1944 and executed the same day.)	Heer	Oberst	Commander of Infanterie-Regiment 117	14 September 1942	—	
Wilhelm Herget+	Luftwaffe	Hauptmann (Note: According to Scherzer as Hauptmann of the Reserves.)	Gruppenkommandeur of the I./Nachtjagdgeschwader 4	20 June 1943	Awarded 451st Oak Leaves 11 April 1944	—
Rudolf Herkelmann	Heer	Oberleutnant of the Reserves	Chief of the 6./Grenadier-Regiment 426	30 April 1943	—	—
Erich Herkner	Luftwaffe	Leutnant	Pilot in the 14.(Eis)/Kampfgeschwader 55	6 December 1944	—	—
Wilfried Herling	Luftwaffe	Oberleutnant	Staffelführer of the 7./Sturzkampfgeschwader 2 "Immelmann" (Note: According to Scherzer as pilot in the III./Sturzkampfgeschwader 2 "Immelmann".)	4 March 1943	—	—
Ernst Herlt	Heer	Hauptmann	Chief of the 9./Artillerie-Regiment 253	17 April 1945	—	—
Alfred Hermann	Heer	Oberst	Commander of Infanterie-Regiment 3	24 September 1942*	Killed in action 4 August 1942	—
Helmut Hermann	Heer	Hauptmann	Commander of the I./Gebirgsjäger-Regiment 100	18 December 1944	—	—
Horst Hermann	Luftwaffe	Feldwebel	Pilot in the 2./Schlachtgeschwader 2 "Immelmann" (Note: According to Scherzer as pilot in the 2./Schlachtgeschwader 2.)	6 December 1944	—	—
Dipl.-Ing. Karl Hermann	Heer	Oberst of the Reserves	Commander of Jäger-Regiment 384 (kroat.)	24 December 1944	—	—
Othmar Hermes	Heer	Gefreiter	Company messenger in the 6./Grenadier-Regiment 464	11 June 1944	—	—
Rolf Hermichen+	Luftwaffe	Hauptmann	Gruppenkommandeur of the I./Jagdgeschwader 11	26 March 1944	Awarded 748th Oak Leaves 19 February 1945	—
Walter Herold	Heer	Oberstleutnant	Commander of Artillerie-Regiment 10 (motorized)	13 October 1941	—	—
Wilhelm Herold	Heer	Hauptmann	Commander of the I./Grenadier-Regiment 21	26 March 1944	—	—
Traugott Herr+	Heer	Oberst	Commander of the 13. Schützen-Brigade	2 October 1941	Awarded 110th Oak Leaves 9 August 1942; 117th Swords 18 December 1944	
Friedrich Herrlein	Heer	Generalmajor	Commander of the 18. Infanterie-Division (motorized)	22 September 1941	—	—
Benno Herrmann	Luftwaffe	Oberleutnant	Pilot in the 4./Kampfgeschwader 76 (Note: According to Scherzer as pilot in the II./Kampfgeschwader 76.)	19 June 1942	—	
Ernst Herrmann	Luftwaffe	Oberst	Commander of Flak-Regiment 25 (motorized) (Note: According to Scherzer as commander of Flak-Regiment 25 (deployable).)	18 July 1944	—	—
Fritz Herrmann	Heer	Major	Commander of the I./Infanterie-Regiment 36	26 December 1941	—	—
Georg Herrmann	Heer	Oberleutnant	Leader of the I./Jäger-Regiment 38	31 December 1944	—	—
Hajo Herrmann+	Luftwaffe	Oberleutnant	Staffelkapitän of the 7./Kampfgeschwader 4 "General Wever"	13 October 1940	Awarded 269th Oak Leaves 2 August 1943; 43rd Swords 23 January 1944	Black-and-white portrait of a man wearing a military uniform with an Iron Cross displayed at his neck.
Harry Herrmann	Luftwaffe	Oberleutnant	Chief of the 5./Fallschirmjäger-Regiment 1	9 July 1941	—	A man wearing a military uniform, peaked cap, and an Iron Cross displayed at the front of his uniform collar.
Kurt Herrmann	Heer	Major	Commander of Pionier-Bataillon 28	26 March 1944	—	—
Richard Herrmann	Heer	Oberfeldwebel	Zugführer (platoon leader) in the Stabskompanie/Jäger-Regiment 49	16 January 1944	—	—
Wilhelm-Karl Herrmann	Heer	Oberstleutnant	Commander of Grenadier-Regiment 273	9 June 1944	—	—
Rüdiger Hertel	Heer	Hauptmann	Leader of the I./Panzergrenadier-Regiment 12	28 October 1944	—	—
Hubertus Hertwig	Heer	Major	Commander of the I./Panzergrenadier-Regiment 66	5 January 1944	—	—
Gustav Hertz	Heer	Major (Note: According to Scherzer as Major of the Reserves.)	Commander of the I./Artillerie-Regiment 258	29 September 1940	—	—
Fritz Hertzsch	Heer	Oberst	Commander of Infanterie-Regiment 77	8 August 1941*	Killed in action 15 July 1941	—
Hans-Erich Herwig	Heer	Oberleutnant of the Reserves	Chief of the 7./Grenadier-Regiment 511	25 January 1943	—	—
Max Herzbach	Luftwaffe	Hauptmann	Chief of the 7./Fallschirmjäger-Regiment 7	13 September 1944	—	A man wearing a military uniform with an Iron Cross displayed at the front of his uniform collar.
Heinz Herzer	Heer	Oberfeldwebel	Pioneer Zugführer (platoon leader) in the 10./Schützen-Regiment 25	21 August 1941	—	—
Friedrich Herzig	Waffen-SS	SS-Sturmbannführer	Commander of schwere SS-Panzer-Abteilung 503 in the III.(germanische)SS-Panzerkorps (Note: According to Scherzer as commander of schwere SS-Panzer-Abteilung 503.)	29 April 1945	—	—
Hans-Georg Herzog+	Heer	Major of the Reserves	Commander of the II./Panzergrenadier-Regiment 14	6 April 1944	Awarded 798th Oak Leaves 23 March 1945	—
Karl Herzog	Heer	Oberstleutnant	Commander of Heeres-Sturm-Pionier Brigade 627 (motorized)	17 April 1945	—	—
Kurt Herzog+	Heer	Generalleutnant	Commander of the 291. Infanterie-Division	18 October 1941	Awarded 694th Oak Leaves 12 January 1945	—
Otto Herzog	Heer	SA-Obergruppenführer	Leader of a Volkssturm-Einheit in the fortress Breslau and leader of a Kampfgruppe in the fortress Breslau	15 April 1945	—	—
[Dr.] Ernst Hess	Luftwaffe	Oberleutnant	Leader of the 4./leichte Flak-Abteilung 192 (deployable) (Note: According to Scherzer as leader of the 4./schwere Flak-Abteilung 192 (deployable).)	30 September 1944	—	—
[Dr.] Hans-Georg Hess	Kriegsmarine	Oberleutnant zur See of the Reserves	Commander of U-995	11 February 1945	—	—
Georg Hesse	Heer	Major	Leader of the III./Infanterie-Regiment 120 (motorized)	31 December 1941	—	—
Heinrich Hesse	Heer	Oberleutnant of the Reserves	Leader of the I./Grenadier-Regiment 366	10 September 1944	—	—
Joachim Hesse	Heer	Oberst	Commander of Panzergrenadier-Regiment 64	6 April 1944	—	—
Rudolf Hesse? (Note: The nomination by his unit—which had only been approved by the division and the corps—was received by the main office of the Heerespersonalamt (HPA—Army Staff Office) on 22 April 1945. It had been addressed to the liaison officer of the Reichsführer-SS with the HPA/P 5 and reached the department P 5 on 28 April. No file card was created. The book "Verliehene Ritterkreuze" (Awarded Knight Crosses) states an entry date 28 April 1945. Additionally it contains the approval from Major Joachim Domaschk "Knight's Cross yes". There is no further information regarding its presentation. According to the Association of Knight's Cross Recipients (AKCR) the award was presented in accordance with the Dönitz-decree. This is illegal according to the Deutsche Dienststelle (WASt) and lacks legal justification. The presentation date was assigned by Walther-Peer Fellgiebel.)	Heer	Leutnant	Leader of the 2./Grenadier-Regiment 165	9 May 1945	—	—
Franz Hessinger	Luftwaffe	Oberleutnant	Pilot in the 2.(F)/Aufklärungs-Gruppe 123 (Note: According to Scherzer as pilot in the Aufklärungsstaffel 2.(F)/123.)	8 August 1944	—	—
Günter Hessler	Kriegsmarine	Kapitänleutnant	Commander of U-107	24 June 1941	—	—
Hermann Hessler! (Note: According to Walther-Peer Fellgiebel Hermann Hessler is delisted without reason.)	Heer	Oberst	Commander of Grenadier-Regiment 286	17 September 1943	—	—
Emil Hethey	Heer	Major	Commander of Kampfgruppe "Hethey" in the fortress Küstrin	14 April 1945	—	—
Franz Hettinger	Luftwaffe	Oberfeldwebel	Radio operator and air gunner in the Stabsstaffel/Schlachtgeschwader 77 (Note: According to Scherzer as radio operator in the Stab/Schlachtgeschwader 77.)	27 July 1944	—	—
Ernst Hetzel	Luftwaffe	Major	In the Stab/Kampfgeschwader 100	20 April 1945	—	—
Matthäus Hetzenauer	Heer	Gefreiter	Sniper in the 7./Gebirgsjäger-Regiment 144	17 April 1945	—	—
Konrad Heubeck	Waffen-SS	SS-Untersturmführer	Leader of the 1./SS-Panzer-Regiment 1 "Leibstandarte SS Adolf Hitler"	17 April 1945	—	A man wearing a black military uniform and various military decorations.
Otto Heubuch	Heer	Oberjäger	Geschützführer (gun layer) in the 16./Gebirgsjäger-Regiment 13	8 February 1944	—	—
Heinz Heuer? (Note: A lawful presentation via the chain of command to the chief of the Heerespersonalamt (HPA—Army Staff Office) Wilhelm Burgdorf in Berlin submitted nomination is possible. Also possible is a direct presentation by Adolf Hitler. However no evidence of the award made to Heinz Heuer can be found in the German Federal Archives. The author Veit Scherzer argues that this is strange because Burgdorf had verifiably informed the HPA of direct presentations made in Berlin up to 26 April (including). Scherzer was denied access to files, which could help clarify the case, of the Association of Knight's Cross Recipients (AKCR) on the grounds of the Bundesarchivgesetz (German Archive Law). The head of the order commission of the AKCR, Walther-Peer Fellgiebel, wrote in a letter to Heuer dated 24 November 1985: "evidently dubious, to put it mildly." Heuer was a member of the AKCR.)	Heer	Oberfeldwebel (Feldgendarmerie)	In a Kampfgruppe z.b.V. Berlin 5	22 April 1945	—	—
Robert Heuer	Luftwaffe	Oberleutnant	Pilot in the 4.(F)/Aufklärungs-Gruppe 14 (Note: According to Scherzer as pilot in the Aufklärungsstaffel 4.(F)/14.)	5 April 1944	—	—
Wilhelm Heun	Heer	Generalmajor	Commander of the 83. Infanterie-Division	9 December 1944	—	—
Conrad Heuß	Heer	Hauptmann	Leader of the II./Infanterie-Regiment 109	27 March 1942	—	—
Wilhelm Heute	Luftwaffe	Oberleutnant	Staffelkapitän in the III./Kampfgeschwader 54	5 February 1944	—	—
Helmut Heutling	Heer	Unteroffizier	Richtschütze (gunner) in the 9.(Infanteriegeschütz)/Panzergrenadier-Regiment 59 (Note: According to Scherzer as Richtschütze (gunner) in the 9./Panzergrenadier-Regiment 59.)	22 August 1943	—	—
Georg-Henning von Heydebreck	Luftwaffe	Oberst	Commander of Fallschirm-Panzer-Regiment 1 "Hermann Göring" (Note: According to Scherzer on 24 June 1944 as commander of Fallschirm-Panzer-Regiment "Hermann Göring".)	25 June 1944	—	—
Günther Heydemann	Kriegsmarine	Kapitänleutnant	Commander of U-575	3 July 1943	—	—
Dr. jur. Dr. rer. pol. Friedrich-August von der Freiherr von der Heydte+	Luftwaffe	Hauptmann	Commander of the I./Fallschirmjäger-Regiment 3	9 July 1941	Awarded 617th Oak Leaves 30 September 1944	A man wearing a military uniform with an Iron Cross displayed at the front of his uniform collar.
Werner Heyduck	Heer	Oberleutnant	Chief of the 1./Grenadier-Regiment 44	3 March 1945	—	—
Hellmuth Heye	Kriegsmarine	Kapitän zur See	Commander of heavy cruiser Admiral Hipper	18 January 1941	—	A man wearing a black naval military uniform, peaked cap, and an Iron Cross displayed at the front of his uniform collar.
Johann Heyen	Heer	Oberleutnant of the Reserves	Chief of the 4.(MG)/Grenadier-Regiment 377 (Note: According to Scherzer as chief of the 4./Grenadier-Regiment 377.)	27 August 1944	—	—
Hans-Joachim Heyer	Luftwaffe	Leutnant	Pilot in the III./Jagdgeschwader 54	25 November 1942*	Killed in action 9 November 1942	—
Ernst-Georg Baron von Heyking	Heer	Rittmeister	Commander of the III./Grenadier-Regiment 15 (motorized)	6 April 1944	—	—
Otto Heymann	Heer	Leutnant	Leader of the 8./Panzer-Regiment 31	17 March 1945	—	—
Otto Heymer	Luftwaffe	Major	Staffelkapitän of the 2.(H)/Aufklärungs-Gruppe 14	13 April 1941	—	—
Alfred Heyn	Heer	Leutnant of the Reserves	Zugführer (platoon leader) in the 7./Grenadier-Regiment 267	12 August 1944	—	—
Hans-Walter Heyne	Heer	Oberst	Commander of Artillerie-Regiment 182	16 April 1943	—	—
Rudolf Heynsen	Kriegsmarine	Korvettenkapitän of the Reserves zur Verwendung (for disposition)	Chief of the 27. Minensuchflottille	20 April 1945	—	—
Herbert Heyrowsky	Heer	Rittmeister	Commander of Radfahr-Abteilung 248	14 September 1942*	Killed in action 4 July 1942	—
Ulrich Heyse	Kriegsmarine	Kapitänleutnant	Commander of U-128	21 January 1943	—	—
Kurt Heyser	Heer	Oberst	Commander of Infanterie-Regiment 47	26 May 1940	—	—
Karl Hieber	Heer	Hauptmann	Leader of the I./Infanterie-Regiment 522	20 February 1942	—	—
Otto Hielscher	Heer	Oberleutnant	Chief of the 5./Artillerie-Regiment 168	23 August 1944	—	—
Walter Hildebrand	Luftwaffe	Hauptmann	Pilot in the 3./Kampfgeschwader 26	5 April 1944 (Note: According to Scherzer on 6 April 1944.)	—	—
Dr. med. vet. Klaus Hilgemann+	Heer	Oberleutnant	Chief of the 13.(IG)/Infanterie-Regiment 422 (Note: According to Scherzer as chief of the 13./Infanterie-Regiment 422.)	8 October 1942	Awarded 641st Oak Leaves 29 October 1944	—
Kurt Hilgendorff	Heer	Oberstleutnant	Commander of Grenadier-Regiment 3	5 April 1944	—	—
Wilhelm Hilgers	Heer	Leutnant	Leader of the 6./Sturm-Regiment 215	31 July 1943*	Killed in action 11 July 1943	—
Alfred Hille	Heer	Hauptmann of the Reserves	Leader of a Kampfgruppe in the V. SS-Gebirgs-Korps (commander of the I./Fahnenjunker-Grenadier-Regiment 1237)	21 April 1945	—	—
August Hille	Heer	Leutnant of the Reserves	Leader of the 6./Panzergrenadier-Regiment 33	9 June 1944	—	—
Franz Hillebrand	Heer	Oberjäger	Group leader in the 1./Gebirgsjäger-Bataillon 94	5 April 1944*	Killed in action 8 January 1944	—
Carl Hilpert+	Heer	General der Infanterie	Commanding general of the LIV. Armeekorps	22 August 1943	Awarded 542nd Oak Leaves 8 August 1944	—
Richard Hilsheimer	Heer	Major of the Reserves	Commander of the I./Artillerie-Regiment 20 (motorized)	28 November 1943	—	—
Willi Hilss	Heer	Unteroffizier	Geschützführer (gun layer) in Panzer-Jäger-Abteilung 46	19 January 1941	—	—
Günther Hilt+	Heer	Oberleutnant of the Reserves	Leader of the 7./Jäger-Regiment 56	14 September 1942	Awarded 386th Oak Leaves 8 February 1944	—
Gottfried Hiltensperger	Heer	Feldwebel	Zugführer (platoon leader) in the 4.(MG)/Grenadier-Regiment 190 (Note: According to Scherzer as Zugführer (platoon leader) in the 4./Grenadier-Regiment 190.)	18 February 1945	—	—
Bernhard Himmelskamp	Heer	Obergefreiter	Richtschütze (gunner) in the 4./Panzer-Regiment 35	13 September 1943*	Died of wounds 28 August 1943 (Note: According to Scherzer on 29 August 1943.)	—
Hans Hindelang	Heer	Oberfeldwebel	Zugführer (platoon leader) in the 14.(Panzerjäger)/Infanterie-Regiment "Großdeutschland" (motorized) (Note: According to Scherzer as Zugführer (platoon leader) in the 14./Infanterie-Regiment (motorized) "Großdeutschland".)	4 September 1940	—	—
Wilhelm Hinerasky	Heer	Oberstleutnant	Commander of Grenadier-Regiment 528	23 December 1943	—	—
Claus Hinkelbein	Luftwaffe	Hauptmann	Gruppenkommandeur of the II./Kampfgeschwader 30	14 June 1940 (Note: According to Scherzer on 19 June 1940.)	—	—
Heinz Hinkes	Luftwaffe	Hauptmann	Pilot and technical officer in the IV./Transportgeschwader 4	20 April 1944	—	—
Ernst Hinrichs	Luftwaffe	Oberleutnant	Pilot in the 2./Kampfgeschwader 51	25 July 1942	—	—
Erwin Hintz	Heer	Obergefreiter	Commander of a SPW in the 8./schweres Panzergrenadier-Regiment 6 (gepanzert) (Note: According to Scherzer as commander of a SPW in the 8./Panzergrenadier-Regiment 6.)	11 March 1945*	Died of wounds 28 February 1945	—
Johannes Hintz	Luftwaffe	Oberstleutnant	Commander of Flak-Regiment 101 (motorized)	29 July 1940	—	—
Kurt Hintz	Luftwaffe	Hauptmann	Commander of the I./Flak-Regiment 40 (motorized) (Note: According to Scherzer as commander of the I./Flak-Regiment (self motorized) 40.)	6 February 1945	—	—
Ingfried Hintze	Heer	Hauptmann	Commander of the I./Panzer-Artillerie-Regiment 103	20 October 1944) (Note: According to Scherzer on 6 February 1945.)	—	—
Otto Hintze	Luftwaffe	Oberleutnant	Staffelkapitän of the 3./Erprobungsgruppe 210 (JG) (Note: According to Scherzer as Staffelkapitän of the 3./Erprobungsgruppe 210.)	24 November 1940	—	—
Bruno Hinz+	Waffen-SS	SS-Untersturmführer	Leader of the 2./SS-Panzergrenadier-Regiment 10 "Westland"	2 December 1943	Awarded 559th Oak Leaves 23 August 1944	—
Ferdinand Hippel	Heer	Oberst	Commander of Grenadier-Regiment 253	22 October 1943	—	—
Walter von Hippel	Luftwaffe	Oberstleutnant	Commander of Flak-Regiment 102 (motorized)	29 July 1940	—	—
Gustav Hippler	Heer	Oberleutnant of the Reserves	Leader of the 5./Infanterie-Regiment 74 (motorized)	4 September 1940	—	—
Johannes Hirn	Luftwaffe	Oberleutnant	Pilot in Nahaufklärungs-Gruppe 32 (Note: According to Scherzer as pilot in Aufklärungsstaffel 1(H)./32.)	7 April 1945	—	—
Hans Hirning	Waffen-SS	SS-Rottenführer	Granatwerfertruppführer (grenade thrower team leader) in the 6./SS-"Totenkopf"-Infanterie-Regiment 1	23 October 1942	—	—
Karl Hirsch	Heer	Feldwebel	Zugführer (platoon leader) in the 3./Schützen-Regiment 4	18 October 1941	—	—
Ernst-Erich Hirschfeld	Luftwaffe	Oberleutnant	Pilot in the 5./Jagdgeschwader 300 (Note: According to Scherzer as pilot in the 6./Jagdgeschwader 300.)	24 October 1944*	Killed in action 28 July 1944	—
Harald von Hirschfeld+	Heer	Oberleutnant	Chief of the 7./Gebirgsjäger-Regiment 98	15 November 1941	Awarded 164th Oak Leaves 23 December 1942	—
Ludwig Hirschmann	Heer	Leutnant	In the 11./Artillerie-Regiment 29 (motorized)	19 January 1943	—	—
Heinz-Horst Hißbach	Luftwaffe	Hauptmann	Gruppenkommandeur of the II./Nachtjagdgeschwader 2	15 April 1945*	Killed in action 14 April 1945	—
Josef Hißmann	Heer	Major	Commander of Heeres-Flak-Bataillon 617 (Note: According to Scherzer as commander of Flak-Bataillon (motorized) 609.)	13 May 1943	—	—
Hubertus Hitschhold+	Luftwaffe	Hauptmann	Gruppenkommandeur of the I./Sturzkampfgeschwader 2 "Immelmann"	21 July 1940	Awarded 57th Oak Leaves 31 December 1941	
Alfons Hitter+	Heer	Oberst	Commander of Artillerie-Regiment 178	14 December 1941	Awarded 488th Oak Leaves 4 June 1944	—
Günter Hitz	Luftwaffe	Hauptmann	Staffelkapitän of the 2./Sturzkampfgeschwader 77	22 November 1943	—	—
Otto Hitzfeld+	Heer	Oberstleutnant	Commander of Infanterie-Regiment 213	30 October 1941	Awarded 65th Oak Leaves 17 January 1942 (158th) Swords 9 May 1945? (Note: Otto Hitzfeld's nomination was rejected by Major Joachim Domaschk on 30 April 1945 and commented: "This is not a nomination!" (Only leadership and organisational achievements, no personal bravery) he additionally noted: "missing in cauldron AOK 11". The nomination was thus assessed as insufficient as well as postponed according to AHA 44 Ziff. 572. The entry date noted on the nomination list for the higher grades of the Knight's Cross of the Iron Cross is 28 April 1945. The list indicates a note "deferred". The approval cannot be proven. The order commission of the Association of Knight's Cross Recipients (AKCR) handled the case in 1981 and decided: Swords yes, 9 May 1945. The AKCR claims that the award was presented in accordance with the Dönitz-decree. This is illegal according to the Deutsche Dienststelle (WASt) and lacks legal justification. The sequential number "158" and presentation date was assigned by the AKCR. Hitzfeld was member of the AKCR.)	The head and shoulders of a man. He wears a peaked cap and a military uniform and an Iron Cross displayed at the front of his uniform collar. His facial expression is determined; his eyes are looking into the camera.
Johann Hlauschka	Heer	Unteroffizier	Group leader in the 3./Grenadier-Regiment 462	3 April 1943	—	—
