= Haugk =

Haugk is a German surname. Notable people with the surname include:

- Dietrich Haugk (1925–2015), German film director and voice actor
- Else Haugk (1889–1973), Swiss aviator
- Helmut Haugk (1914–1992), German flying ace
- Werner Haugk (1912–1944), German flying ace
