= 96th Infantry Division (Wehrmacht) =

- 96. Infanterie-Division
- Active: 25 September 1939 – 8 May 1945
- Country: Nazi Germany
- Branch: Army
- Type: Infantry
- Size: Division
- Nickname: Watzmann Division
- Engagements: World War II: Kamenets-Podolsky pocket

The 96th Infantry Division (German: 96. Infanterie-Division) was a German division deployed during World War II. It was formed on 25 September 1939 in Bergen as part of the 5th wave (aufstellungswelle).

The division was equipped with captured Czech weapons and In 1942, 40-45% of the division's soldiers were Polish. It later surrendered to the US forces at the end of the war, but some elements of the division were handed over to the Red Army

== Commanding officers ==
- General der Infanterie Erwin Vierow (29 September 1939 – 1 August 1940)
- Generalleutnant Wolf Schede (1 August 1940 – 10 April 1942)
- Generalleutnant Joachim Freiherr von Schleinitz (10 April 1942 – 6 October 1942)
- Generalleutnant Ferdinand Nöldechen (10 October 1942 – ?? March 1943)
- Oberst Rudolf Noack (?? March 1943) (deputize)
- Generalleutnant Ferdinand Nöldechen (?? March 1943 – 1 May 1943)
- Oberst Gottfried Weber (1 May 1943 – 31 May 1943) (deputize)
- Generalleutnant Ferdinand Nöldechen (31 May 1943 – 28 July 1943)
- Generalleutnant Richard Wirtz (28 July 1943 – 30 November 1943)
- Generalmajor Johann Albrecht von Blücher (1 December 1943 – ?? January 1944) (deputize)
- Generalleutnant Richard Wirtz (?? January 1944 – 3 March 1943)
- Oberst Adolf Fischer (3 March 1944 – 10 April 1944) (deputize)
- Generalleutnant Richard Wirtz (10 April 1944 – 7 September 1943)
- Generalleutnant Werner Dürking (7 September 1944 – 11 September 1944)
- Oberst Kobolt (12 September 1944 – 10 November 1944) (deputize)
- Generalleutnant Richard Wirtz (10 September 1944 – 1 December 1944)
- Generalmajor Hermann Harrendorf (1 December 1944 – 8 May 1945)
