= Ferdinand Noeldechen =

German general (1895–1951)

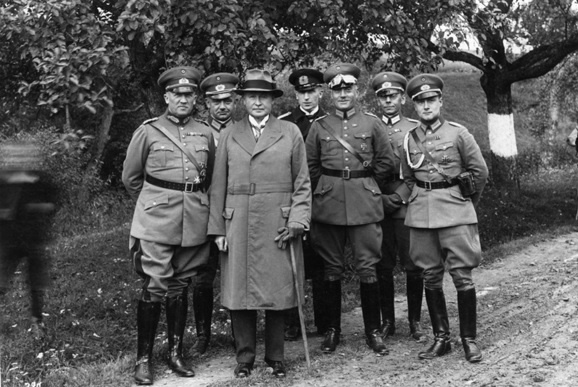
- Noeldechen in 1930 (second from left)
- Born: 26 April 1895; Preußisch Stargard, Province of West Prussia, German Empire
- Died: 20 October 1951 (aged 56); Hamburg, West Germany
- Military career
- Allegiance: German Empire; Weimar Republic; Nazi Germany
- Branch: Imperial German Army; Reichswehr; German Army (Wehrmacht)
- Service years: 1913–1945
- Rank: Generalleutnant
- Commands: 96th Infantry Division; 438th Division
- Conflicts: World War I World War II
- Awards: Knight's Cross of the Iron Cross; German Cross in gold

Ferdinand Noeldechen (26 April 1895 – 20 October 1951) was a German career military officer who fought in both world wars. As a Generalleutnant in the Wehrmacht of Nazi Germany during World War II, he commanded two infantry divisions. He was a recipient of the Knight's Cross of the Iron Cross.

== Early military career ==
Noeldechen was born in 1895 at Preußisch Stargard in West Prussia (today, Starogard Gdański in Poland) and entered the Royal Prussian Army as an officer cadet in 1913. Commissioned as a Leutnant, he fought during World War I with the 42nd Field Artillery Regiment and was awarded both classes of the Iron Cross. He remained in the post-war Reichswehr, rose through the ranks and became the adjutant to XVIII Army Corps in April 1938.

== World War II ==
Noeldechen commanded the 12th Artillery Regiment from March 1940 until February 1942 when he was named Artillery Commander 2. He took command of the 96th Infantry Division in October 1942, was promoted to Generalmajor in November and led the division until June 1943. He was promoted to Generalleutnant on 1 May 1943. His last command was at the head of the 438th Division from July 1943 until Germany's surrender in May 1945. Noeldechen died in Hamburg in October 1951.

== Awards and decorations ==
- Iron Cross (1914) 2nd and 1st class
- Hanseatic Cross of Hamburg
- Wound Badge (1914) in black
- Honour Cross of the World War 1914/1918
- Clasp to the Iron Cross 2nd and 1st class
- German Cross in gold (15 December 1941)
- Knight's Cross of the Iron Cross (8 June 1943) as Generalmajor and commander of 96th Infantry Division

Military offices
Preceded by Generalleutnant Joachim Freiherr von Schleinitz	Commander of the 96th Infantry Division; 9 October 1942 – 28 June 1943	Succeeded by Generalleutnant Richard Wirtz
