= Helmut Haugk =

German World War II fighter pilot

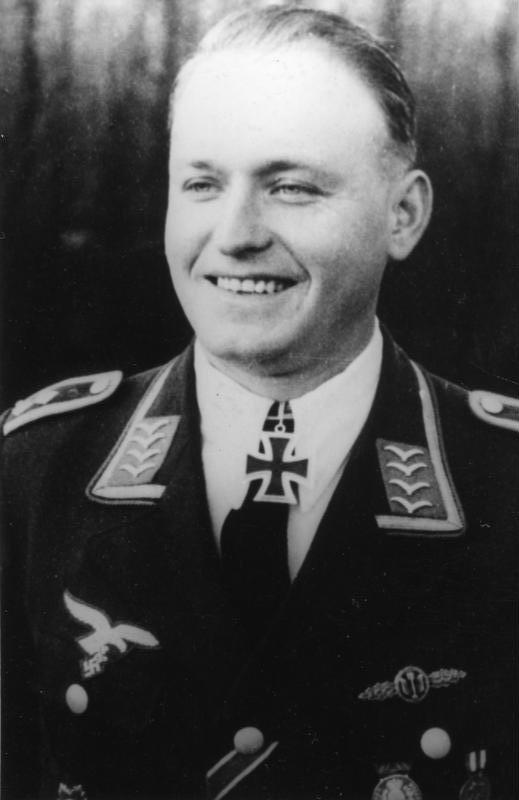
- Helmut Haugk
- Born: 24 February 1914; Gelsenkirchen, German Empire
- Died: 28 January 1992 (aged 77); Gelsenkirchen, Germany
- Relatives: Werner Haugk (brother)
- Military career
- Allegiance: Nazi Germany
- Branch: Luftwaffe
- Service years: 1937–45
- Rank: Hauptmann (captain)
- Units: ZG 26; ZG 101; ZG 76
- Conflicts: World War II: Invasion of Poland; Battle of France; Battle of Britain; Invasion of Yugoslavia; Battle of Greece; Battle of Crete; Battle of Malta; North African Campaign; Defense of the Reich
- Awards: Knight's Cross of the Iron Cross

Helmut Haugk (24 February 1914 – 28 January 1992) was a Luftwaffe ace and recipient of the Knight's Cross of the Iron Cross during World War II. The Knight's Cross of the Iron Cross, and its variants were the highest awards in the military and paramilitary forces of Nazi Germany during World War II. Haugk claimed 18 aerial victories in more than 440 flights.

On 29 September 1939, while serving with 3. Staffel of Zerstörergeschwader 26 (ZG 26—26th Destroyer Wing), Haugk was shot down and wounded when in his Messerschmitt Bf 109 D-1 (Werknummer 481—factory number) during combat with Royal Air Force (RAF) Handley Page Hampden southeast of Heligoland.

His brother Leutnant Werner Haugk, who had received the Knight's Cross of the Iron Cross as Fahnenjunker-Oberfeldwebel after approximately 300 combat missions on 8 August 1944, was shot down and killed in action on 18 October 1944 near Aalborg, Denmark by British fighters while flying a Bf 109 trainer.

== Summary of career ==
=== Aerial victory claims ===
Mathews and Foreman, authors of Luftwaffe Aces — Biographies and Victory Claims, researched the German Federal Archives and found records for twelve aerial victory claims over the Western Allies, including one heavy bomber.

Chronicle of aerial victories
Claim	Date	Time	Type	Location	Claim	Date	Time	Type	Location
– 7. Staffel of Zerstörergeschwader 26 – Battle of France — 10 May – 25 June 1940
1	14 May 1940	13:05	Spitfire	north of Buzancy	3	27 May 1940	15:15	Hawk 75	southeast of Reims
2	3 June 1940	15:10	Hawk 75	southeast of Reims					
– 7. Staffel of Zerstörergeschwader 26 – Battle of Britain and on the English Channel — 10 July – 31 October 1940
4	10 July 1940	15:04	Spitfire	southeast of Dover	6	28 September 1940	15:45	Spitfire	south of Southampton
5	26 September 1940	17:23	Hurricane	south of Southampton					

=== Awards and decorations ===
- Aviator badge
- Front Flying Clasp of the Luftwaffe in Gold
- Iron Cross (1939)
  - 2nd Class (13 October 1939)
  - 1st Class (23 May 1940)
- Wound Badge (1939)
  - in Black
  - in Silver
- Ehrenpokal der Luftwaffe (1 March 1941)
- German Cross in Gold on 14 February 1942 as Oberfeldwebel in the 7./Zerstörergeschwader 26
- Knight's Cross of the Iron Cross on 21 December 1942 as Oberfeldwebel and pilot in the 9./Zerstörergeschwader 26 "Horst Wessel" (Note: According to Scherzer as pilot in the 9./Zerstörergeschwader 26.)
