= Heinz Hackler =

German World War II fighter pilot (1918–1945)

- Born: 14 December 1918; Siegen, Germany
- Died: 1 January 1945 (aged 26) near Antwerp, Nazi-occupied Belgium
- Cause of death: Killed in action
- Burial place: Ysselsteyn German war cemetery block X—row 11—grave 260
- Military career
- Allegiance: Nazi Germany
- Branch: Luftwaffe
- Rank: Leutnant (first lieutenant)
- Unit: JG 77
- Commands: 8./JG 77, 11./JG 77
- Conflicts: World War II: Eastern Front; Defense of the Reich; Operation Bodenplatte
- Awards: Knight's Cross of the Iron Cross

Heinrich "Heinz" Hackler (14 December 1918 – 1 January 1945) was a German Luftwaffe fighter ace and recipient of the Knight's Cross of the Iron Cross during World War II. The Knight's Cross of the Iron Cross, and its variants were the highest awards in the military and paramilitary forces of Nazi Germany during World War II. Hackler was listed as missing in action near Antwerp, Belgium after being hit by Allied flak during Operation Bodenplatte. Depending on source, Hackler was credited with 56 or 67 aerial victories.

== Early life and career ==
Hackler was born on 14 December 1918 in Siegen, at the time in the Province of Westphalia of the Weimar Republic. Following flight training, (Note: Flight training in the Luftwaffe progressed through the levels A1, A2 and B1, B2, referred to as A/B flight training. A training included theoretical and practical training in aerobatics, navigation, long-distance flights and dead-stick landings. The B courses included high-altitude flights, instrument flights, night landings and training to handle the aircraft in difficult situations.) he was posted to the 8. Staffel (8th squadron) of Jagdgeschwader 77 (JG 77—77th Fighter Wing) in early 1941. At the time, 8. Staffel was commanded by Oberleutnant Kurt Ubben. The Staffel was subordinated to III. Gruppe (3rd group) of JG 77 which was headed by Major Alexander von Winterfeldt.

== World War II ==
World War II in Europe had begun on Friday 1 September 1939 when German forces invaded Poland. In preparation for Operation Marita, the German invasion of Greece, III. Gruppe of JG 77 was moved to Deta in western Romania on 4 April 1941 and to Korinos on 19 April. That day, Hackler claimed his first aerial victory when he shot down a Hawker Hurricane fighter near Larissa.

=== Eastern Front ===
In preparation for Operation Barbarossa, the German invasion of the Soviet Union, III. Gruppe was moved to Bucharest and was located in the sector of Heeresgruppe Süd (Army Group South). III. Gruppe arrived in Bucharest on 16 June. Four days later, III. Gruppe moved to Roman.

On 25 September 1941, Hackler claimed his fifth aerial victory, a Mikoyan-Gurevich MiG-3 fighter in the combat area near Perekop. The next day, he became an "ace-in-a-day" claiming his aerial victories six through ten. Hackler was credited with shooting down two Polikarpov I-16 fighters, two Ilyushin Il-2 ground attack aircraft and a Petlyakov Pe-2 bomber. During the fighting along the Isthmus of Perekop on 29 September, Hackler claimed a MiG-3 fighter shot down. On 15 October, while the 11th Army was preparing for the attack on the Crimea Peninsula in what would become the Crimean campaign, Hackler shot down a Pe-2 bomber on mission to Armiansk and Ishun, located approximately 4 kilometers (2.5 miles) southeast of Krasnoperekopsk. The next day, he claimed two I-16 fighters in the same combat area. By 27 October, the fighting has moved to the combat area south of Perekop. That day, Hackler claimed a Polikarpov I-15 and I-16 fighter.

=== Mediterranean Theater and Romania ===
On 23 October 1942, the British Eighth Army launched the Second Battle of El Alamein. Preceding this attack, the Luftwaffe had already planned to replace Jagdgeschwader 27 (JG 27—27th Fighter Wing), which had been fighting in North African theater, with JG 77. In preparation for this rotation, III. Gruppe of JG 77 was moved to Munich on 19 October where it was equipped with the Bf 109 G-2/trop. On 23 and 24 October, the Gruppe moved to Bari in southern Italy. The Gruppe then relocated to Tobruk Airfield on 26 October. The following day, the Gruppe moved to an airfield at Tanyet-Harun. On 29 March 1943, Hackler claimed a Curtiss P-40 Warhawk fighter shot down 25 kilometers (16 miles) south of Meknassy. In early May 1943, III. Gruppe was withdrawn from combat operations and ordered to relocate to Foggia for a brief period of rest and replenishment. Here on 17 May, Hackler was awarded the German Cross in Gold (Deutsches Kreuz in Gold).

When on 5 April 1944 the commanding officer of 8. Staffel (8th squadron) of JG 77, Oberleutnant Norbert Kestler was killed in action, Hackler was briefly appointed Staffelkapitän (squadron leader) until the arrival of Hauptmann Helmut Goedert. That day, the United States Army Air Forces (USAAF) attacked the oil refineries at Ploiești with 95 Boeing B-17 Flying Fortress and 135 Consolidated B-24 Liberator bombers. III. Gruppe flew two missions against the USAAF bombers. On the second mission, Hackler claimed a B-24 bomber shot down. On 1 July, Hackler was officially appointed Staffelkapitän of 8. Staffel (8th squadron) of JG 77. He then succeeded Leutnant Wilhelm Mockel who had temporarily replaced Hauptmann Helmut Goedert after he had been wounded in combat on 31 May. As part of the group expansion from three Staffeln per Gruppe to four Staffeln per Gruppe, Hackler's 8. Staffel was re-designated and became the 11. Staffel of JG 77 on 15 August. Hackler, together with Oberfeldwebel Johann Pichler, was awarded the Knight's Cross of the Iron Cross (Ritterkreuz des Eisernen Kreuzes) on 19 August 1944.

=== Operation Bodenplatte and death ===
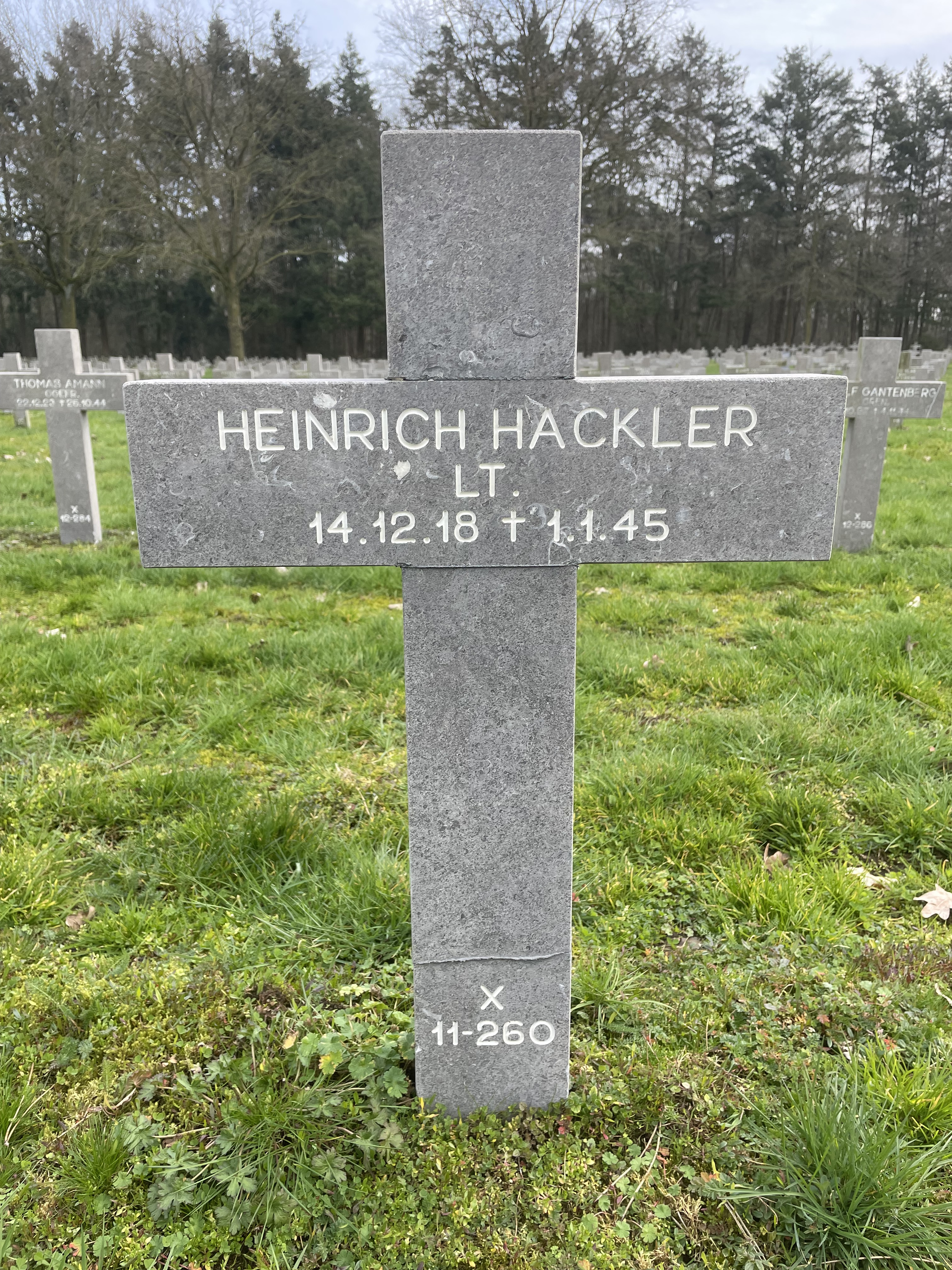
German War Cemetery Ysselsteyn - Heinrich Hackler

On 31 December 1944 in preparation for Operation Bodenplatte, the failed attempt to cripple Allied air forces in the Low Countries, III. Gruppe transferred to Dortmund Airfield. Hackler led a formation of 13 Messerschmitt Bf 109 K-4 on this flight. While airborne, Hackler received orders to engage a formation of Hawker Tempest fighters sighted near Münster. Near Münster, Hackler's formation came under attack from Spitfire fighters, losing three Bf 109s shot down, two pilots killed in action and one severely wounded.

At Dortmund, the pilots were briefed on the upcoming operation. JG 77 under command of Major Siegfried Freytag were given the objective to attack the airfield at Antwerp-Deurne. Since Hauptmann Armin Köhler, the commanding officer of III. Gruppe was sick, Hackler was tasked by Freytag with leading III. Gruppe in the attack. At 08:00 on 1 January 1945, the two formations 18 Bf 109s of I. and III. Gruppe took off. At the same time 23 Bf 109s of II. Gruppe took off. Around the Bocholt area they formed up with the other two Gruppen. As the fighter wing headed north, it passed Woensdrecht airfield. The aerodrome was home to 132 Wing and its five Spitfire squadrons; 331, 332, 66 and 127, and 322 (Dutch). Some pilots from II. Gruppe either mistakenly believed it to be Antwerp, or thought the opportunity was too good to pass up. Two German fighters were claimed shot down, and one pilot captured. However, none of the JG 77 casualties fit this description. Near Antwerpen, Hackler was shot down and killed in action when his Bf 109 K-4 (Werknummer 330196—factory number) was hit by anti-aircraft artillery on his third strafing attack. He was last seen heading northeast, crashing near Raambert, north of Zundert where he was initially buried. In consequence, command of 11. Staffel was given to Leutnant Wilhelm Mockel. In October 1949, Hackler was reinterred at the Ysselsteyn German war cemetery, Netherlands. Due to a spelling error of his name which marked his grave as "Heinrich Hachler", his fate remained unanswered for many years. His widow and other relatives also failed to receive an answer his fate. In August 1997, the Deutsche Dienststelle (WASt) linked the various bits of information available and remarked his grave at Ysselsteyn.

== Summary of career ==
=== Aerial victory claims ===
According to US historian David T. Zabecki, Hackler was credited with 56 aerial victories. Weal lists him 67 aerial victories, including nine heavy bombers of the USAAF Fifteenth Air Force shot down over Romania and Hungary. Mathews and Foreman, authors of Luftwaffe Aces – Biographies and Victory Claims, researched the German Federal Archives and state that Hackler was credited with 37 aerial victories plus further four unconfirmed claims. This figure includes 24 claims made on the Eastern Front and 13 on the Western Front, including at least five four-engined bombers.

Victory claims were logged to a map-reference (PQ = Planquadrat), for example "PQ 5659". The Luftwaffe grid map (Jägermeldenetz) covered all of Europe, western Russia and North Africa and was composed of rectangles measuring 15 minutes of latitude by 30 minutes of longitude, an area of about 360 square miles (930 km^{2}). These sectors were then subdivided into 36 smaller units to give a location area 3 km × 4 km (1.9 mi × 2.5 mi) in size.

Chronicle of aerial victories
This and the ♠ (Ace of spades) indicates those aerial victories which made Hackler an "ace-in-a-day", a term which designates a fighter pilot who has shot down five or more airplanes in a single day. This and the – (dash) indicates unconfirmed aerial victory claims for which Hackler did not receive credit. This along with the * (asterisk) indicates an Herausschuss (separation shot)—a severely damaged heavy bomber forced to separate from his combat box which was counted as an aerial victory. This and the ! (exclamation mark) indicates those aerial victories listed by Prien, Stemmer, Rodeike and Bock. This and the # (hash mark) indicates those aerial victories listed by Mathews and Foreman.
Claim!	Claim#	Date	Time	Type	Location	Claim!	Claim#	Date	Time	Type	Location
– 8. Staffel of Jagdgeschwader 77 – Balkans and Crete — 1 April – 1 June 1941
1		19 April 1941	11:20	Hurricane	25 km (16 mi) north of Lamia						
– 8. Staffel of Jagdgeschwader 77 – Operation Barbarossa — 22 June – 5 December 1941
2	1	22 June 1941	19:03	I-16		3	2	8 July 1941	18:25	DB-3	
According to Prien, Stemmer, Rodeike and Bock, Hackler claimed his fourth aerial victory in late August 1941. This claim is not listed by Mathews and Foreman.
5		25 September 1941	—	MiG-3		11		29 September 1941	17:13	MiG-3	
6♠		26 September 1941	—	I-16		12	7	15 October 1941	09:33	Pe-2	
7♠	3	26 September 1941	11:26	V-11 (Il-2)		13		16 October 1941	—	I-16	
8♠	4	26 September 1941	11:29	V-11 (Il-2)		14		16 October 1941	—	I-16	
9♠	5	26 September 1941	13:58	Pe-2		15	8	27 October 1941	12:38	I-15	
10♠	6	26 September 1941	16:02	I-16		16	9	27 October 1941	12:50	I-16	
– 8. Staffel of Jagdgeschwader 77 – Eastern Front — 6 December 1941 – 20 March 1942
	10	5 January 1942	11:35	I-153		22		5 March 1942	09:40	MiG-3	
17		6 January 1942	11:35	I-153		23	12	5 March 1942	17:03	I-16	
18	—	10 January 1942	—	DB-3			13	15 March 1942	10:50	I-153	
19	—	10 January 1942	—	DB-3			14	15 March 1942	10:55	I-153	
20	—	10 January 1942	—	DB-3		24	15	17 March 1942	10:15	I-153	PQ 5659
21	11	23 February 1942	11:05	I-153							
– 8. Staffel of Jagdgeschwader 77 – Eastern Front — April – June 1942
	16	19 April 1942	11:20	Hurricane			17	11 June 1942	12:47	Il-2	
– Stab of III. Gruppe of Jagdgeschwader 77 – Eastern Front — 1 May – 16 October 1942
	18	2 July 1942	14:40	Il-2	PQ 66561		20	15 July 1942	09:03	I-153	
	19	2 July 1942	14:46	Il-2			21	12 September 1942	14:02	LaGG-3	PQ 10182; 55 km (34 mi) southeast of Sloboda
According to Prien, Stemmer, Rodeike and Bock, Hackler claimed nine aerial victories in May/July while serving with the Stab of JG 77.
	22	21 September 1942	11:18	Pe-2		39		4 October 1942	—	Yak-1	
38	23	30 September 1942	11:46	Yak-1	PQ 00263						
– Stab III. Gruppe of Jagdgeschwader 77 – Mediterranean Theater, North Africa — 26 October – 31 December 1942
41		3 November 1942	—	P-40			25	18 November 1942	12:37	P-40	10 km (6.2 mi) northeast of Sidi Ahmed el-Magrun
42	24	9 November 1942	14:46	P-40	10 km (6.2 mi) east of Sallum						
– Stab III. Gruppe of Jagdgeschwader 77 – Mediterranean Theater, North Africa — January 1943
45		18 January 1943	14:22	P-38	PQ 13 Ost 52312, Zarzur						
– 8. Staffel of Jagdgeschwader 77 – Mediterranean Theater, North Africa — February – May 1943
—		4 February 1943	—	P-38		48	28	11 April 1943	11:38	Spitfire	PQ 03 Ost 97271, west of Tebourba
—		2 March 1943	—	P-40		—		25 April 1943	—	P-40	
—		4 March 1943	—	P-40		—		4 May 1943	—	Spitfire	
46	26	15 March 1943	14:48	P-38	30 km (19 mi) west of Gafsa	49	29	7 May 1943	15:22	Spitfire	PQ 03 Ost 97271, west of Tebourba
47	27	29 March 1943	19:10	P-40	25 km (16 mi) south of Meknassy						
– 8. Staffel of Jagdgeschwader 77 – Mediterranean Theater, Italy — June – 25 October 1943
50	30	18 June 1943	10:14	B-25	PQ 04 Ost 9275, northwest of Olbia	—	—	24 June 1943	—	P-38	
—		23 June 1943	—	P-38		—		7 August 1943	—	Beaufighter	
– 8. Staffel of Jagdgeschwader 77 – Mediterranean Theater, Italy — 1 January – 15 August 1944
51	31	5 April 1944	14:35	B-24	PQ 24 Ost 55126; 30 km (19 mi) east-northeast of Pitești	53	34	18 May 1944	11:17	B-17*	PQ 24 Ost 55738; 60 km (37 mi) southwest of Bucharest
	32	24 April 1944	12:04	B-17	Romania	54	35	31 May 1944	09:58	B-24*	PQ 24 Ost 5527; 60 km (37 mi) southwest of Bucharest
52	33	5 May 1944	14:15	B-24	PQ 24 Ost 4417; 50 km (31 mi) southwest of Caracal	55	36	3 July 1944	12:20	P-51	PQ 24 Ost 6582; 60 km (37 mi) southwest of Bucharest
– 11. Staffel of Jagdgeschwader 77 – Mediterranean Theater, Italy — 15 August – 15 September 1944
56	37	23 August 1944	08:08	Yak-9	PQ 24 Ost 7743; 10 km (6.2 mi) northwest of Huși						

=== Awards ===
- Iron Cross (1939) 2nd and 1st Class
- Honor Goblet of the Luftwaffe on 26 July 1943 as Feldwebel and pilot
- German Cross in Gold on 17 May 1943 as Oberfeldwebel in the III./Jagdgeschwader 77
- Knight's Cross of the Iron Cross on 19 August 1944 as Fahnenjunker-Oberfeldwebel and pilot in the III./Jagdgeschwader 77
