= Hermann Harrendorf =

German general in World War II (1896–1966)

- Born: 18 May 1896
- Died: 27 March 1966 (aged 69)
- Military career
- Allegiance: German Empire; Nazi Germany
- Branch: Army
- Rank: Generalmajor
- Commands: 96. Infanterie-Division
- Conflicts: World War II
- Awards: Knight's Cross of the Iron Cross

Hermann Harrendorf (18 May 1896 – 27 March 1966) was a German general in the Wehrmacht of Nazi Germany during World War II. He was a recipient of the Knight's Cross of the Iron Cross.

== Awards and decorations ==
- Knight's Cross of the Iron Cross on 16 February 1942 as Hauptmann and commander of III./Infanterie-Regiment 469

Military offices
Preceded by Generalleutnant Richard Wirtz	Commander of 96. Infanterie-Division; 1 December 1944 – 8 May 1945	Succeeded by None
