= Hellmuth Hauser =

German general in the Bundeswehr

Hellmuth Hauzer
- Born: 24 February 1916
- Died: 5 September 2004 (aged 88)
- Military career
- Allegiance: Nazi Germany; West Germany
- Branch: Luftwaffe; German Air Force
- Rank: Generalleutnant
- Conflicts: World War II
- Awards: Knight's Cross of the Iron Cross

Hellmuth Hauser (24 February 1916 – 5 September 2004) was a German general in the Bundeswehr. During World War II, he served in the Luftwaffe and was a recipient of the Knight's Cross of the Iron Cross of Nazi Germany.

== Awards and decorations ==
- Knight's Cross of the Iron Cross on 23 December 1942 as Hauptmann and Staffelkapitän in the I./Kampfgeschwader 51
