= Heinz Heuer =

German military police officer

Leutnant der Feldgendarmerie Heinz Heuer
- Heuer as an Oberfeldwebel
- Born: 2 August 1918; Berlin
- Died: 6 January 2002 (aged 83)
- Military career
- Allegiance: Nazi Germany
- Branch: Army
- Service years: 1936–45
- Rank: Leutnant der Feldgendarmerie
- Conflicts: Battle of Berlin
- Awards: Knight's Cross of the Iron Cross; Tank Destruction Badge in Gold × 2; Tank Destruction Badge in Silver × 3

Heinz Heuer (2 August 1918 – 6 January 2002) was a German military police (German: Feldgendarmerie) officer who was awarded the Knight's Cross of the Iron Cross for single-handedly destroying 13 Soviet tanks during the Battle of Berlin in the closing days of World War II. He was the only member of the Feldgendarmerie to be awarded the Knight's Cross of the Iron Cross, the highest award in the military and paramilitary forces of Nazi Germany during World War II.

== Biography ==
Heuer was born in Berlin on 2 August 1918. His Army career began at the age of 18, serving in Flak regiments in Döberitz and Berlin before undergoing police training in 1938, and being assigned to Ordnungspolizei Headquarters. This was followed by special duties assignments to the Foreign Office and Wehrmacht Headquarters (German: Oberkommando der Wehrmacht, OKW) military intelligence (German: Abwehr) foreign department. During the war, Heuer served on a number of fronts and also with the Brandenburgers.

In 1945, Heuer was an Oberfeldwebel der Gendarmerie in charge of a special purpose kampfgruppe during the Battle of Berlin. On 16 April 1945, he was assigned a mission by the Chief of the Army Headquarters (German: Oberkommando des Heeres, OKH) General der Infanterie Hans Krebs. The task involved attacking a Soviet command post, and Heuer led a group of 28 soldiers to complete the mission. While establishing the location of the Russian headquarters, Heuer and his men observed about 40 enemy tanks. On the night of 21 April, Heuer's group captured the Russian command post, and seized a quantity of maps and important documents. While returning from their mission, they encountered elements of their kampfgruppe engaging the enemy tanks they had seen earlier. Heuer and his group joined their comrades, and during the fighting 27 Russian tanks were destroyed, with Heuer personally accounting for 13 of that number using Panzerfaust one-shot anti-tank weapons. Upon his report to Krebs, the general was so pleased with Heuer's successful completion of the mission and his tank destruction efforts that Krebs awarded him the Knight's Cross of the Iron Cross, (Note: A lawful presentation via the chain of command to the chief of the Heerespersonalamt (HPA—Army Staff Office) Wilhelm Burgdorf in Berlin submitted nomination is possible. Also possible is a direct presentation by Adolf Hitler. However no evidence of the award made to Heuer can be found in the German Federal Archives. The author Veit Scherzer argues that this is strange because Burgdorf had verifiably informed the HPA of direct presentations made in Berlin up to 26 April (inclusive). Scherzer was denied access to files, which could help clarify the case, of the Association of Knight's Cross Recipients (AKCR) on the grounds of the Bundesarchivgesetz (German Archive Law). The head of the order commission of the AKCR, Walther-Peer Fellgiebel, wrote in a letter to Heuer dated 24 November 1985: "evidently dubious, to put it mildly." Heuer was a member of the AKCR.) witnessed by Adolf Hitler's personal adjutant General of the Infantry Wilhelm Burgdorf and SS-Gruppenführer Hermann Fegelein. Krebs also field promoted Heuer to Leutnant der Feldgendarmerie.

Heuer was subsequently given the task of carrying a personal message from Hitler to Obergruppenführer und General der Waffen-SS Felix Steiner, the commander of Army Detachment Steiner, which was an ad-hoc formation based on remnants of the III (Germanic) SS Panzer Corps. Heuer departed on a motorcycle to perform the mission, but was soon captured by the Russians. Along with some other captured Germans, Heuer was given a spade and told to dig his own grave. Once this was done, he was offered a last cigarette. Artillery fire caused their Soviet guards to take cover, and Heuer and the other Germans escaped. After the war ended, Heuer became a Soviet prisoner again, and spent time in camps in Siberia. He obtained help from a female Russian doctor, and was sent to East Berlin, but was then denounced to Soviet military intelligence (Russian: Glavnoye razvedyvatel'noye upravleniye, GRU) who arrested him. By this time, Heuer was severely malnourished and weighed only 38.5 kilograms (85 lb). Eventually, with assistance from a Russian officer, Heuer was able to escape to West Berlin. After the war, Heuer returned to policing.

As a police investigator in 1952, Heuer attempted to establish the circumstances of the death of his brother-in-law, who had been captured while fighting alongside the 6th SS Mountain Division Nord at Leisenwald and Waldensberg near Wächtersbach. Along with others, he had apparently been shot in the head by U.S. Army soldiers. His inquiries were not fruitful, but the German War Graves Commission did conduct an exhumation of a mass grave in the area in 1961, and re-interred 34 bodies in the nearby war cemetery, 23 of which had clearly been shot in the head. Heuer returned to the area during this investigation and tried to push for an inquiry into the killings, but was unsuccessful. He died on 6 January 2002.

== Awards ==
Heuer received the following awards during his service:

- Iron Cross 2nd Class
- Iron Cross 1st Class
- Eastern Front Medal
- War Merit Cross 2nd Class with Swords
- Wound Badge in Silver
- Front Line Driver's Badge in Gold
- Tank Destruction Badge in Gold × 2
- Tank Destruction Badge in Silver × 3
- Knight's Cross of the Iron Cross on 22 April 1945 as Oberfeldwebel (Feldgendarmerie) in a Kampfgruppe z.b.V. Berlin 5 (Note: Von Seemen commented that the presentation of the Knight's Cross of the Iron Cross to Heuer cannot be verified in the German Federal Archives. However, Von Seemen also states that the chief of the personnel office of the Order Police (Chef des Personalamtes der Ordnungspolizei), SS-Gruppenführer and Generalleutnant of the Ordnungspolizei, Adolf von Bomhard, had testified and the presentation is documented in the history of the 4th SS Polizei Panzergrenadier Division Volume 2.)
