= Special Engineer Detachment =

Manhattan Project personnel program

9812nd Technical Service Unit
- Manhattan Project Shoulder Patch
- Active: 22 May 1943–15 August 1947
- Country: United States
- Branch: United States Army Corps of Engineers
- Size: 6,032 on 1 December 1945
- Garrison/HQ: Los Alamos Laboratory, Oak Ridge
- Engagements: World War II; Manhattan Project; Project Alberta; Operation Crossroads

The Special Engineer Detachment (SED) was a U.S. Army program that identified enlisted personnel with technical skills, such as machining, or who had some science education beyond high school, to meet the needs of the Manhattan Project during World War II. SED personnel included the Clinton Engineer Works, Hanford Engineer Works and Los Alamos Laboratory. SED personnel began arriving at Los Alamos in October 1943, and by August 1945, 1,800 worked there. They worked in all areas and activities of the Laboratory, including the Trinity Test, and served overseas on Tinian in support of the atomic bombing of Hiroshima and Nagasaki and in the Pacific with the Operation Crossroads nuclear test series at Bikini Atoll in 1946.

== Recruitment ==
With mobilization of American manpower underway due to the needs of the armed forces, the leadership of the Manhattan Project anticipated that they would have difficulty recruiting and retaining skilled technical staff. To meet this need, the Special Engineer Detachment (SED) was formed by the Army Service Forces on 22 May 1943. The personnel were known as "SEDs".

The average age of scientific and technical employees at the Los Alamos Laboratory was less than thirty, so many were eligible for the draft under the Selective Training and Service Act of 1940. Although the Manhattan Project attempted to recruit draft-exempt employees, this was not always possible. Deferments were therefore sought, but the authority to grant them lay with local draft boards, and the tight security surrounding the Manhattan Project meant that the boards could not be informed of the reason for the sought deferment. In most cases though, the Selective Service officials were impressed by the Manhattan Project officials' efficiency and determination to minimize the number of requests and granted the deferment. In cases involving an employee at a firm, a check had to be made of all employees to ensure that the person concerned was indeed essential. In February 1944, the War Department banned further deferments for men under the age of 22 in the employ of the War Department or its contractors. This applied to a small number of personnel, who were assigned to the SED upon being drafted into the Army.

To meet the Manhattan Project's needs for personnel with technical skills, the Manhattan Project's Personnel Division was assisted by the headquarters of the Army Specialized Training Program (ASTP), which placed its resources at the Manhattan Project's disposal. The ASTP arranged with the universities for security clearances and interviews with ASTP students. The Office of the National Roster of Scientific and Specialized Personnel looked through its files, which contained entries for 597,666 men and women by 1 July 1943, and provided the names, industrial and educational background and military draft status of qualified scientific personnel. Many colleges and universities furnished the names and draft status of graduating students with desired skills. In November 1943, the Manhattan Project secured the services of Samuel T. Arnold, the dean of undergraduates at Brown University, to identify and recruit promising students. He then became the Manhattan Project's liaison officer on personnel matters. Merriam H. Trytten of the National Roster of Scientific and Professional Personnel was attached to the Manhattan Project for several months during which he visited universities and hired scientific personnel.

== Authorization ==
Personnel authorizations were handled by the United States Army Corps of Engineers, of which the Manhattan District was a part, until 31 July 1945, when responsibility passed to the headquarters of Army Service Forces. In January 1945, the Corps of Engineers activated the 9812th Technical Service Unit, and most of the enlisted personnel at the Clinton Engineer Works (CEW), the Hanford Engineer Works (HEW) and the Los Alamos Laboratory were transferred to the new unit on 1 February. At Los Alamos, however, the Military Police Corps, Women's Army Corps and service personnel remained part of the 8th Service Command's 4817th Service Command Unit.

The demands of the Manhattan Project for specialized skills grew inexorably. From an initial allotment of 62 officers when the Manhattan District was activated on 13 August 1942, the authorization grew to 699 officers on 31 October 1945. The initial authorization of enlisted personnel was 334 on 22 May 1943, and there was a series of increasing authorizations until 31 October 1945, when a peak strength of 6,032 enlisted personnel was authorized. Included in this was an authorization for 75 enlisted women on 15 June 1943, which grew to 370 on 31 December 1945.The Manhattan Project reached peak strength of 4,976 enlisted personnel on 1 November 1945, but this also included Military Police Corps, Women's Army Corps and service personnel as well as scientific and technical staff.

During 1946, the Manhattan Project's strength decreased as the demobilization of United States armed forces after World War II progressed, and the authorization was lowered to 2,203 on 9 December 1946. Recruitment continued into 1946, with 1,449 additional personnel requested during the year to replace demobilized personnel, and the Manhattan Project still had 2,326 enlisted personnel on 31 December 1946. The Manhattan District was abolished on 15 August 1947.

== Demographics ==
The average Army General Classification Test score of the SEDs was 133, which was the highest of any unit in the Army. About 29 percent had college degrees. Some even had PhDs, but most had been inducted into the Army shortly before or just after they completed their undergraduate studies. All were noncommissioned officers. One-third held the rank of staff sergeant or higher, one-third were sergeants, and one-third were corporals. Normally, men with high Army General Classification Test scores went on to become officers, but SEDs were not permitted to apply to Officer Candidate School (OCS) for security reasons. After the war ended, security was lifted a bit and SEDs were invited to apply for OCS but few accepted. SEDs did not have to undergo basic training, but otherwise they were expected to conform to the usual Army routine of early morning exercises, drills and inspections.

== Los Alamos ==
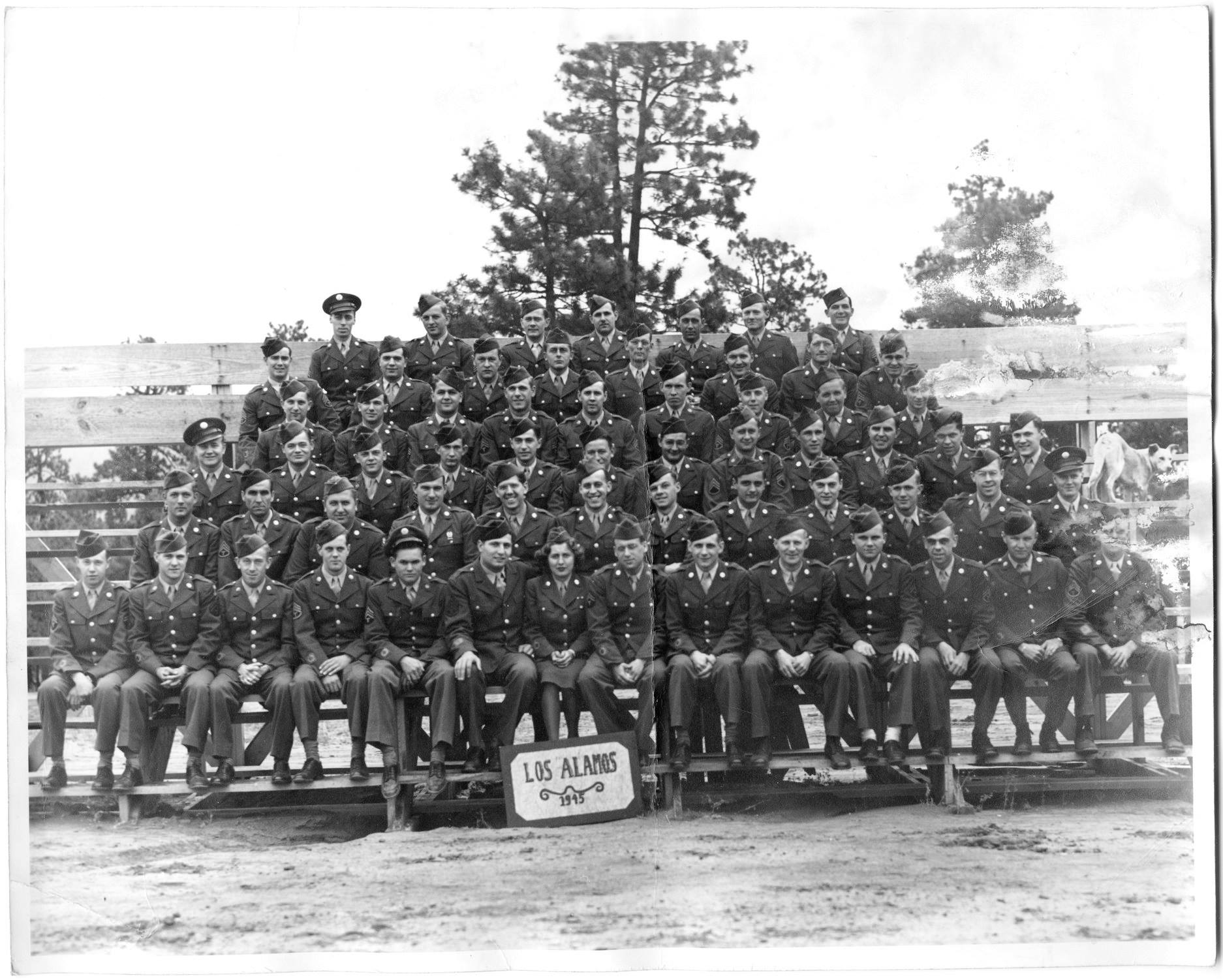
The Special Engineer Detachment (SED) at Los Alamos in 1945

The largest SED contingent was that at the Los Alamos laboratory, where the first SEDs arrived in October 1943. By the end of the year, there were 475 SEDs at Los Alamos. By mid-1944, they accounted for a third of the scientific staff and by July 1945 half of the laboratory personnel were SEDs. In October 1945, there were 1,823 SEDs at Los Alamos. Most of them were mechanical, electrical, or chemical engineers. Many worked directly with scientists, while others served as machinists, mechanics or electronics technicians. Most had blue badges, which gave access to all of Los Alamos except the Technical Area. Those with white badges had access to the Technical Area, the most restricted areas of the site.

The SEDs at Los Alamos occupied a strange status between civilians and military personnel. As technicians, they had to work the same long, irregular hours as the civilians, but as military personnel their accommodation was poorer, pay was much lower, and they had to put up with morning callisthenics and occasional inspections and drills. This elicited scant sympathy from other military personnel at Los Alamos. At Los Alamos, SEDs lived in 60-man barracks heated by coal-fired potbelly stoves. Meals were taken in the Army mess hall. Reveille was at 06:00, callisthenics from 06:30 to 07:00 and there was an inspection on Saturday morning. The SEDs worked the same six-day work week as the civilians. Reveille and callisthenics were dropped in 1944; Saturday inspections remained, but "became devoid of spit and polish. The new company commander would stride down the length of the barracks at something less than the speed of light and that was it for another week."

== Oak Ridge ==
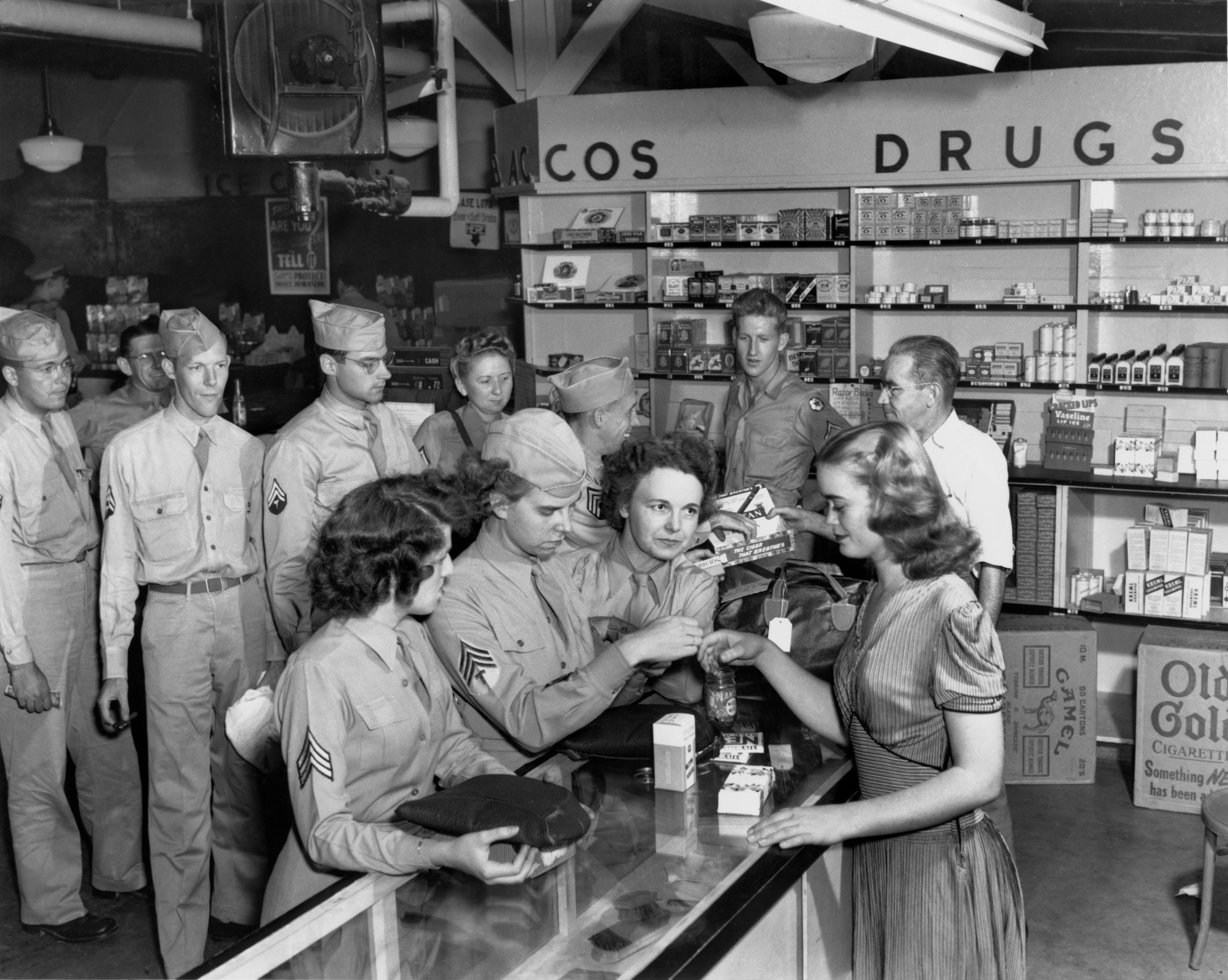
SEDs at the Army PX at Oak Ridge

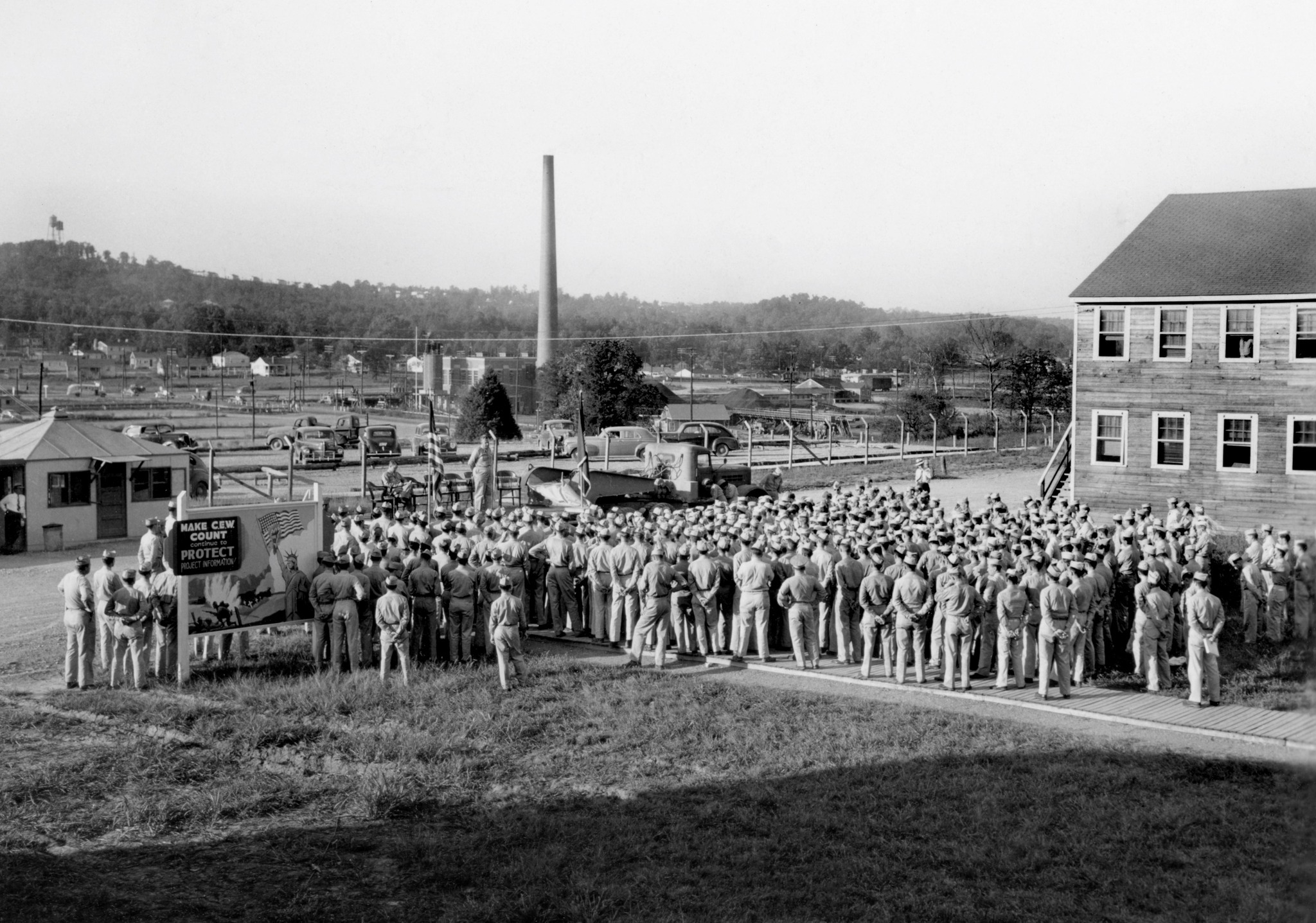
Major General Leslie R. Groves Jr. addresses the troops outside of the Castle at Oak Ridge on 29 August 1945.

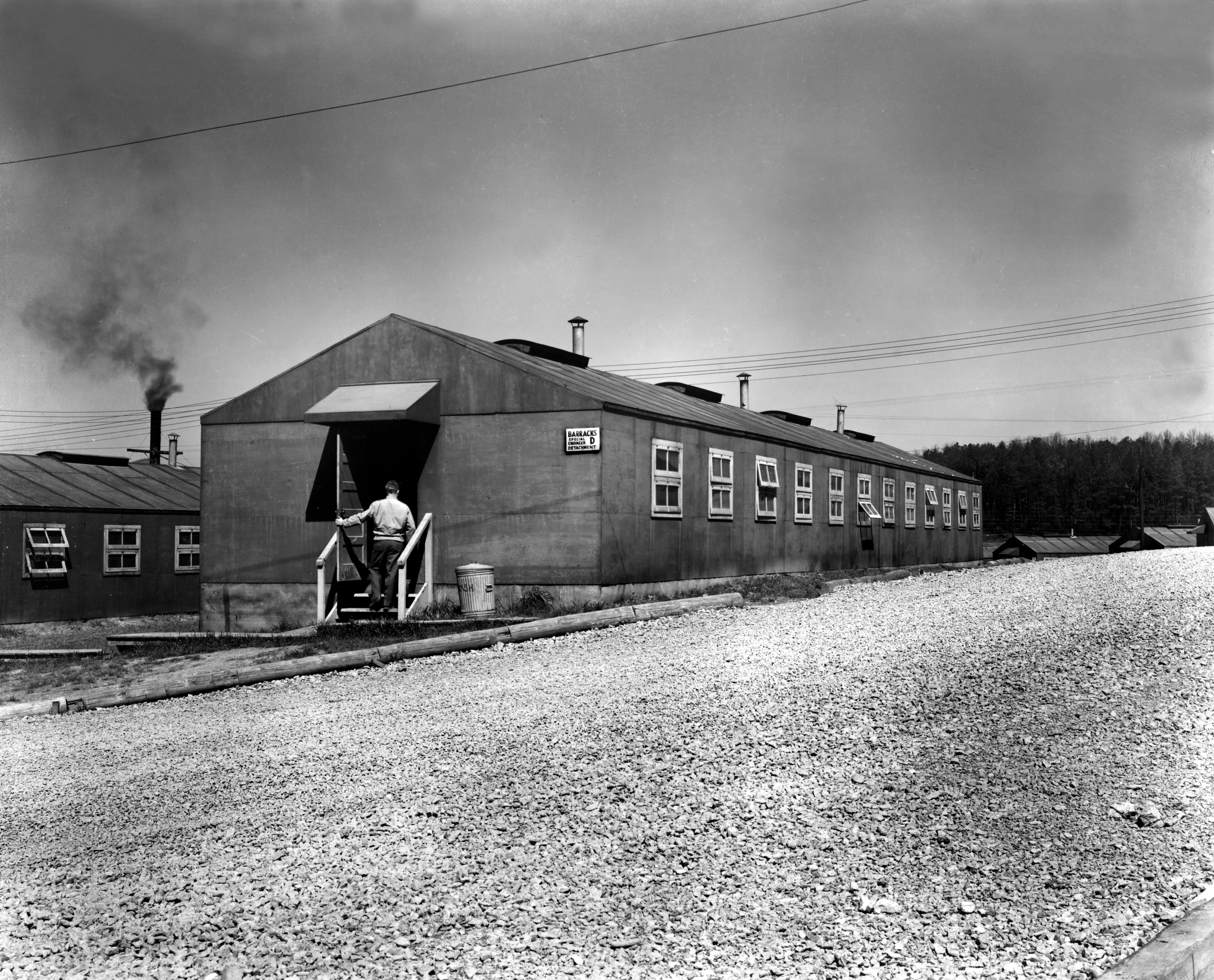
Special Engineering Barracks at Oak Ridge

The first SEDs arrived at the Clinton Engineer Works at Oak Ridge, Tennessee, on 19 July 1943. The first commander was Captain William A. Fogg. He was succeeded by Lieutenant William A. Barger in March 1944. About 450 SEDs were assigned to the Y-12 Electromagnetic Plant, 500 to the K-25 Gaseous Diffusion Plant, 126 to the S-50 Thermal Diffusion Plant, and 100 to the X-10 Graphite Reactor. Another 100 or so were assigned to the Kellex Corporation, the engineering contractor for the K-25 plant, most of whom were located in the New York City area. Some SEDs at Oak Ridge were transferred to Los Alamos in 1944. Not all were scientists or engineers. Richard Gehman was a newspaper and magazine journalist when he was drafted. At Oak Ridge, he edited the post newspaper, The Oak Ridge Journal.

At Oak Ridge, SEDs initially lived in dormitories, along with civilians. In February 1944, they moved into eight barracks. Some SEDs lived in hutments, which were originally intended for Black people. The unmarried men returned to living in dormitories in December 1945, but this time the dormitories in which they lived were occupied by SEDs exclusively. Colonel Kenneth Nichols, the District Engineer of the Manhattan District, later recalled that:

At the CEW, most of the men felt fortunate to be assigned to our work instead of being sent overseas. But some were unhappy because they were working side by side with civilians who drew more pay for the same work. In addition, the married men were not allowed housing for their wives. To help compensate for the difference in pay scales, we based promotions to non-commissioned officers on the job being performed and also made life easier by furnishing maid service to clean their barracks, make beds, etc., and they were given a food allowance for the cafeteria.

SEDs at Oak Ridge did not have to perform KP duty as there were no mess halls. Instead, SEDs received a daily meal allowance of $2.25 equivalent to $41 in 2025 to allow them to eat at the same cafeterias as the civilians. SEDs who were hospitalized had 75 cents deducted from their allowance to pay for the food in hospital. GIs arriving from other Army posts were amazed to find beds with inner spring mattresses and Black maids arriving to make the beds and clean the rooms.

== Other sites ==
Some enlisted men worked with private contractors or in small communities. On 12 June 1944, the Manhattan District was authorized to transfer up to 563 enlisted personnel to the Enlisted Reserve Corps. This allowed them to work inconspicuously as civilians, while they still remained under Army control for security reasons.

In August 1944, Groves asked ten SEDs at Oak Ridge for volunteers for a dangerous assignment. All ten volunteered. They were sent to Philadelphia to learn about the operation of a pilot plant for the S-50 Thermal Diffusion Plant. On 2 September 1944, SED Private Arnold Kramish, and two civilians, Peter N. Bragg Jr. and Douglas P. Meigs, were working in a transfer room when a 600-pound (270 kg) cylinder of uranium hexafluoride exploded, rupturing nearby steam pipes. The steam reacted with the uranium hexafluoride to create hydrofluoric acid, and the three men were badly burned. SED Private John D. Hoffman ran through the toxic cloud to rescue them, but Bragg and Meigs died from their injuries. Another eleven men, including Kramish and four other soldiers, were injured but recovered. Hoffman, who suffered burns, was awarded the Soldier's Medal, the United States Army's highest award for an act of valor in a non-combat situation, and the only one awarded to a member of the Manhattan District.

SEDs participated in the Trinity nuclear test and with Project Alberta on Tinian, where they were involved in the assembly of the Little Boy and Fat Man bombs used in the atomic bombing of Hiroshima and Nagasaki. After the war ended, some SEDs performed similar duties in support of the Operation Crossroads at Bikini Atoll.

== Legacy ==
On 15 August 1945, the 9812nd Technical Service Unit was awarded a Meritorious Service Unit Plaque for the period from 7 October to 30 November 1944, and a gold star in lieu of a second award for the period 1 December 1944 to 31 May 1945. SEDs were authorized to wear a special insignia of a golden laurel leaf similar to that on the plaque on their lower right sleeve 4 inches (100 mm) above the cuff. Some dubbed this the "Golden Toilet Seat". During the war, the SEDs wore the Army Service Forces (ASF) shoulder patch; afterwards, the special shoulder patch was authorized, which incorporated the ASF design.

When the war ended, SEDs wanted to know when they would be separated from the Army. During a press conference at Oak Ridge with the new Secretary of War, Robert P. Patterson, on 29 September 1945, Groves told the SEDs that they would demobilized on the same basis as other soldiers in the Army. SEDs were offered early discharges if they were willing to perform the same duties in a civilian capacity for six months. Ralph Sparks, a SED who worked as a machinist at Los Alamos, recalled that almost all the SEDs at Los Alamos accepted this offer. Benjamin Bederson recalled that he was offered $6,000 (equivalent to $99,000 in 2025) to participate in the Operation Crossroads nuclear tests for six months. Although this was more than sixty times his salary as a soldier, he declined the offer.

Many SEDs returned to their studies and became successful scientists—including Val Fitch, who was awarded a Nobel Prize in Physics in 1980.

== Sources ==
- Adamson, June (Fall 1997). "The SED in Oak Ridge, 1943-1946: Using a Secret Newsletter by a secret army detachment to learn more about a secret city in Tennessee". Tennessee Historical Quarterly. 56 (3): 196–211. JSTOR 42627362.
- Ahern, Joseph-James (2003). "'We Had the Hose Turned on Us!': Ross Gunn and the Naval Research Laboratory's Early Research into Nuclear Propulsion, 1939–1946". Historical Studies in the Physical and Biological Sciences. 33 (2): 217–236. doi:10.1525/hsps.2003.33.2.217. JSTOR 10.1525/hsps.2003.33.2.217.
- Bederson, Benjamin (2001). "SEDs at Los Alamos: A Personal Memoir" (PDF). Physics in Perspective. 3 (1). Basel: Birkhäuser Verlag: 52–75. Bibcode:2001PhP.....3...52B. doi:10.1007/s000160050056. S2CID 117157405.
- Bederson, Benjamin (2004). "SEDs at Los Alamos". In Kelly, Cynthia C. (ed.). Remembering the Manhattan Project: a Personal Memoir. Singapore: World Scientific Publishing. pp. 81–88. ISBN 978-981-256-040-7. OCLC 5011510150.
- Carmichael, Leonard (February 1944). "The National Roster of Scientific and Specialized Personnel". The Scientific Monthly. 58 (2): 141–147. Bibcode:1944SciMo..58..141C. JSTOR 18092.
- Fitch, Val (February 1975). "The View from the Bottom". Bulletin of the Atomic Scientists. XXXI (2): 43–46. Bibcode:1975BuAtS..31b..43F. doi:10.1080/00963402.1975.11458205 – via Google Books.
- Jones, Vincent (1985). Manhattan: The Army and the Atomic Bomb (PDF). United States Army in World War II. Washington, D.C.: United States Army Center of Military History. OCLC 10913875.
- Manhattan District (1947a). General (PDF). Manhattan District History, Book I – General. Vol. 1. Washington, D.C.: Manhattan District.
- Manhattan District (1947b). Personnel (PDF). Manhattan District History, Book I – General. Vol. 8. Washington, D.C.: Manhattan District.
- Manhattan District (1947c). Technical (PDF). Manhattan District History, Book VIII – Los Alamos Project (Y). Vol. 2. Washington, D.C.: Manhattan District.
- Nichols, Kenneth D. (1987). The Road to Trinity: A Personal Account of How America's Nuclear Policies Were Made. New York: William Morrow and Company. ISBN 0-688-06910-X. OCLC 15223648.
- Sparks, Ralph C. (2000). Twilight Time: A Soldier's Role in the Manhattan Project at Los Alamos. Los Alamos, New Mexico: Los Alamos Historical Society. ISBN 0-941232-25-5. OCLC 1412566185.
