= Panzer Lehr Division =

Panzer-Lehr-Division
- 130. Panzer-Lehr-Division; Panzer-Lehr-Division
- Unit insignia
- Active: 30 December 1943 – 15 April 1945
- Country: Germany
- Branch: Army
- Type: Panzer
- Role: Armoured warfare
- Size: Division; 14,699 (1 June 1944); 11,018 (1 August 1944); 14,892 (16 December 1944)
- Nickname: Parade Division
- Engagements: World War II; Operation Margarethe; Battle of Normandy; Battle of the Bulge

Commanders
- Notable commanders: Fritz Bayerlein

The Panzer-Lehr-Division (tank teaching division) was an elite German armoured division during World War II. It was formed in 1943 onwards from training and demonstration troops (Lehr = "teach") stationed in Germany, to provide additional armored strength for the anticipated Allied invasion of western Europe. On 4 April 1944, the division was officially designated as the 130th Panzer Division; however, it is usually referred to as the Lehr Division. It was the only Wehrmacht Panzer division to be fully equipped with tanks and with halftracks to transport its mechanized infantry. On several occasions it fought almost to destruction, in particular during Operation Cobra, and by the end of the war in Europe bore little resemblance to the unit that had originally been activated.

== History ==
=== Formation ===
Panzer Lehr began forming on 30 December 1943 and moved to the Nancy–Verdun area in January 1944 to complete the process. It was formed from several elite training and demonstration units. Most of the division's original cadre was drawn from Panzertruppenschule I and Panzertruppenschule II, the Panzerwaffe's major training units. These training and demonstration units were some of the most experienced and highly trained troops in the Panzerwaffe, with almost all having seen combat in the East, North Africa, Sicily or Italy and many having received decorations for bravery. As a result of this, Panzer Lehr was considered an elite unit from the time of its formation.

In early 1944, Panzer Lehr division was to be prepared for training to take place in Southern France. Orders received on 6 March 1944 made it clear that the unit was to first be transported to the Vienna area. On 19 March 1944, Panzer Lehr division took part in the German occupation of Hungary codenamed Operation Margarethe, as well to continue its training. The division absorbed the 901st Panzergrenadier-Lehr-Regiment while there. The division left Hungary on 1 May, and returned to France on 15 May 1944 to await the Allied invasion as a part of the OKW's armored reserve, along with the I SS Panzer Corps and the 17th SS Panzergrenadier Division Götz von Berlichingen. These units could be released only with Adolf Hitler's personal authorization.

Panzer Lehr's panzer regiment had a battalion each of Panther and Panzer IV available. Moreover, all the battalions in both panzergrenadier regiments were transported by tracked, armored vehicles, such as the Sd.Kfz. 251 halftrack. This was in contrast to ordinary Wehrmacht panzer divisions, where only the first battalion in the first panzergrenadier regiment was equipped with halftracks, with the remaining battalions equipped with trucks. The division's engineer and reconnaissance formations were also equipped with armored vehicles, the armored reconnaissance battalion having a company of the new Sd.Kfz 234/2 Puma armored cars. The division's panzer regiment also had the 316. Funklenk-Panzerkompanie (abbreviated 1./s.Pz. Kp. 'Funklenk' 316) ("316th Remote Control Panzer company") (Note: The 316th Radio Control Panzer Company was originally equipped with a mix of Tiger I and Tiger II heavy tanks, and remote-controlled demolition vehicles, which could be operated from the Tigers. There is some dispute as to how many, if any, were actually in service during the Normandy Campaign.) attached while in Normandy; this company was originally equipped with ten Tiger I tanks, and was allocated the first five of the new Tiger II tanks that were not used in Normandy, as they broke down en route and had been replaced by 9 Sturmgeschütz (StuG) self-propelled guns, which fought at Tilly and St. Lo until destroyed, at which point the 316th Company was disbanded. The division's panzer regiment had a total complement of 208 operating tanks and assault guns (10 Panzer III, 9 StuG III, 97 Panzer IV, 86 Panthers and 6 Tigers) as of 6 June 1944 plus nine tanks and assault guns under repair (1 Panzer III, 1 StuG III, 2 Panzer IV, 3 Panthers and 2 Tigers). It also had 31 Jagdpanzer IV in its Panzerjäger battalion. Another unique feature of this formation was that its panzergrenadiers were, in large part, dressed in the double-breasted Sturmgeschütz jacket, instead of the standard field blouse worn by other German Army (Heer) units.

=== Normandy ===
==== The Caen battles ====
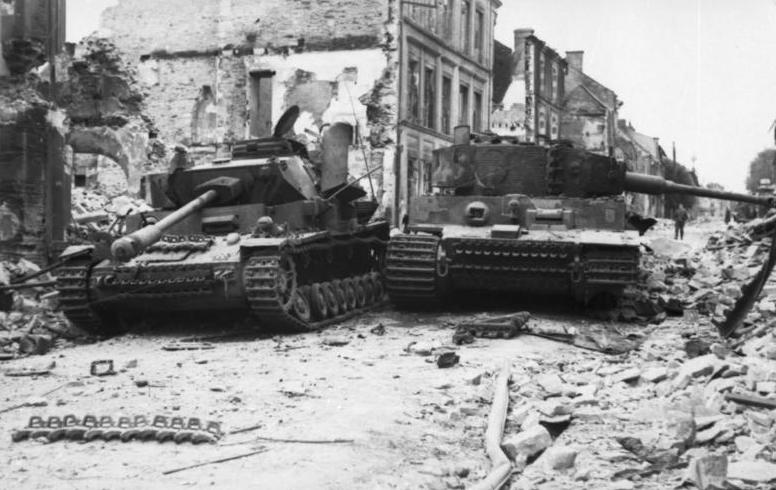
Panzer IV of the Panzer Lehr Division and a Tiger I from the 101st SS Heavy Panzer Battalion at Villers-Bocage

When the Western Allies launched the amphibious invasion of Normandy on 6 June 1944, Panzer Lehr, as a part of the strategic armored reserve (Panzer Group West), was held back from the fighting during the crucial first days. It was soon released, reached the front, and was committed to battle against the British and Canadians on June 8. It was placed in the front line adjacent to the 12th SS Hitlerjugend Division, where it defended Caen and fought several British offensives to a standstill.

On 13 June 1944, an attack by the 22nd Armoured brigade group of the British 7th Armoured Division outflanked Panzer Lehr's defences around Tilly-sur-Seulles and cut through the German lines, taking the village of Villers-Bocage and threatening Panzer Lehr's rear. Elements of Panzer Lehr, the 2nd Panzer Division, and the 101st SS Heavy Panzer Battalion were committed to defeating the British penetration. The ensuing Battle of Villers-Bocage saw the British withdraw to their start lines after two days of inconclusive fighting. By 17 June, Panzer Lehr had been forced to withdraw.

Like all German armoured units engaged in Normandy, Panzer Lehr suffered heavy losses in its transport from Allied air attacks. (Note: Many examples of the experiences and losses suffered by German formations moving up to the front are well known. Panzer Lehr, for instance, on 7 June alone lost 84 half-tracks, prime movers and self propelled guns, 40 fuel bowsers, 90 soft-skinned vehicles and five tanks as it made its way from LeMans to Caen.) By the end of June, the division's armoured component was severely depleted. Despite this, it continued to hold against the British and Commonwealth forces, engaging in heavy fighting near the town of Tilly-sur-Seulles.

By the end of June, the Panzer Lehr Division had suffered 2,972 casualties and reported the loss of 51 tanks and assault guns, 82 halftracks and 294 other vehicles. (Note: Panzerlehr casualties comprised 490 killed in action, 1,809 wounded and 673 missing. Tank and assault guns included the loss of 24 Panzer IVs and 23 Panther tanks had been knocked out.)

==== The Saint-Lô battles ====
On 1 July 1944, Panzer Lehr had only 36 operational Panzer IV tanks (additional 29 in short-term repair and 10 in long-term repair); 32 operational Panther tanks (additional 26 in short term repair and 8 in long term repair) and 28 operational Jagdpanzer and Sturmgeschütze (9 more in short term repair and 1 in long term repair). On 7 July, the division was ordered to pull out of their positions south of Tilly-sur-Seules and head west to provide support to the divisions resisting the American advance near Saint-Lô. The area around Saint-Lô consists of small fields with high ancient hedgerows and sunken lanes, known as bocage. The bocage made it extremely difficult for armor to maneuver and provided superb defensive positions to the infantry on both sides of the battle.

On 10 July, Panzer-Lehr launched a counterattack against elements of the American 9th and 30th infantry divisions around the village of Le Dézert. American M10 tank destroyers knocked out 30 of Panzer Lehr's tanks and forced the remaining tanks to withdraw over the Vire Canal to relative safety.

Over the next two weeks, the division fought a defensive battle of attrition. On 19 July, Saint-Lô fell to the Americans. Six days later, the Americans launched Operation Cobra, their breakout from the Normandy lodgment. By that time, the division had only 2,200 combat troops remaining and 12 Panzer IV and 16 Panthers fit for action and 30 tanks in various states of repair behind the lines. The operation was preceded by a massive aerial bombardment by over 1,500 allied bombers. Panzer Lehr was directly in the path of attack and the division suffered about 1,000 casualties during this bombardment. The division also lost at least 14 assault guns and 10 tanks. Despite strong initial resistance, by 27 July the German defenses has been penetrated. On the same day, Bayerlein reported that Panzer Lehr was "finally annihilated."

On 1 August, the Panzer Lehr had 33 tanks and assault guns operational and a further 44 in workshops. and so on August 17 after a fighting withdrawal, it was ordered back to Alençon for rest and refitting. The division was subsequently called back to Germany for rest and refitting. During August, the division suffered 1,468 casualties.

Within seven months of its formation, the division was reduced to a combat-ineffective unit with only 20 remaining tanks. At one point, in September, it consisted only of a panzer grenadier battalion of company strength, an engineer company, six 105 mm howitzers, five tanks, a reconnaissance platoon, and an Alarmbataillon (emergency alert battalion) of about 200 men recruited from stragglers and soldiers on furlough in Trier. After spending a month refitting in the Saar, the division was moved to Paderborn, receiving 72 tanks, 21 assault guns and replacements, to compensate for the losses suffered in Normandy.

=== The Ardennes ===
==== Operation Wacht am Rhein ====
In early November 1944, Panzer Lehr was transferred to Hasso von Manteuffel's Fifth Panzer Army, part of Field Marshal Walter Model's Army Group B in preparation for the planned winter offensive, Operation Wacht am Rhein, commonly known as the Battle of the Bulge. On 21 November, the partially refitted Panzer Lehr was ordered out of its assembly area to counterattack the American forces driving towards the Saverne Gap. At that time, it has a strength of 34 Panzer IV and 38 Panther tanks. The counterattack stalled, and Panzer Lehr was called back out of the line, much reduced in strength.

The time spent refitting Panzer Lehr and several other units which had been committed prematurely meant that the operation had to be delayed. During the run up to the offensive, Panzer Lehr was kept in reserve, along with the Führer Begleit Brigade. On 15 December, the day before the offensive began, Panzer Lehr was still severely understrength, with only one of its two tank battalions ready for action, the other restored to its parent unit, the 3rd Panzer Division. Both of its panzergrenadier regiments were at 80 percent of its authorized strength. It had only 57 tanks (30 Panthers and 27 Panzer IV) and 20 Jagdpanzer IV/70's by the time the attack jumped off. In compensation, it was reinforced by two tank destroyer battalions and an assault gun brigade. The division's armored reconnaissance battalion was its only organic unit up to strength.

Wacht am Rhein opened on 16 December 1944, and Panzer Lehr moved out from the start positions in the center of the German line. The 26th Volksgrenadier Division was to clear the way for the division, but they soon became bogged down and the Panzer Lehr found itself moving forward at a crawl. The situation worsened over the next two days, with the 901st Panzergrenadier Regiment being halted by the Americans along the road to Wiltz, and the 902nd encountering heavy resistance in the town of Hosingen.

==== Bastogne ====
On 18 December, the assault got back underway. The 26th Volksgrenadier Division had secured the bridge over the Clerf River, opening the way to the road and rail-hub of Bastogne. Panzer Lehr's armored reconnaissance battalion raced ahead, attacking towards Wiltz before rejoining the division on the route to Bastogne. The horse-drawn 26th Volksgrenadier had gotten itself mixed up in Panzer Lehr's column, greatly slowing the advance.

On the 19th, the division's panzer regiment ran into a roadblock near Neffe, held by troops of Combat Team Cherry of the U.S. 10th Armored Division. After initial success, Panzer Lehr's follow up attack resulted in heavy casualties. Combat Team Cherry pulled out, and the way to Bastogne was open again. However, the majority of the division's armor had been sent north to Mageret to support 26th Volksgrenadier. After the taking of Mageret, a local informed Bayerlein, the division's commander, that a column of about 50 American tanks and infantry was seen moving to Longvilly. Bayerlein ordered his troops to halt and set up a roadblock, giving him a chance to regroup and reorganize his troops. By the time that Panzer Lehr moved out again and reached the town of Bastogne, the US 101st Airborne Division (Screaming Eagles) had already secured it. Panzer Lehr was then divided, with half the division left to help 26th Volksgrenadier Division capture Bastogne, while the rest of the division, including most of its armor, were to continue on to the Meuse.

Over the next few days, the Kampfgruppe helping 26th Volksgrenadier, made up mostly of the 901st Panzergrenadier Regiment, wore itself out in successive attacks on the town of Bastogne. As the remainder of the division sped east, it enjoyed some minor successes, including the capture of a large American convoy, but it was brought to a halt by fierce resistance near St. Hubert, and was soon drawn into heavy fighting south of Bastogne. On the 21st, Manteuffel pulled Panzer Lehr out of the fight for Bastogne and grouped it with the 2nd Panzer Division and 116th Panzer Division Windhund for an assault on Dinant and the Meuse.

==== Assault on Dinant ====
After a day spent on reorganising the attack, Panzer Lehr finally got underway. It fought its way through St. Hubert and the road to Dinant and the Meuse again seemed open.

The assaulting unit, the 902nd Panzergrenadier Regiment, was met by heavy resistance. Nor was the advance to become any easier thereafter. On 23 December, the division fought all day to reduce the town of Rochefort, suffering heavy casualties. The Americans finally withdrew – their casualties 25 men killed and 15 men wounded, after holding off an elite panzer division for an entire day.

Bayerlein later compared the defence of Rochefort to that of Bastogne. Panzer Lehr made two rescue attempts to save 2nd Panzer and succeeded in retaking Humain, but was unable to go any further. After another failed rescue effort by 9th Panzer, Panzer Lehr was ordered to fall back. Of the 2nd Panzer Kampfgruppe, only Major Cochenhausen and 600 or so of his men managed to escape on foot, abandoning almost all of the division's armor to the advancing Allies. The Meuse would not be reached; Wacht Am Rhein had failed.

==== Relief of Bastogne ====
The remnants of Manteuffel's strike force were pulled back for one final attempt to take Bastogne. Panzer Lehr began to move into its new positions, after US 4th Armored Division, the spearhead of George Patton's US Third Army, began its attack to relieve Bastogne and a corridor to the surrounded 101st Airborne was created. Panzer Lehr was then involved in the unsuccessful operations to close the corridor, and finally the exhausted division was pulled out of the battle. Panzer Lehr had once again been virtually annihilated.

=== The Netherlands to Ruhr Pocket ===
After the failure of the Ardennes offensive, Panzer Lehr was refitted once again, though not to anywhere near the lavish standard of its earlier incarnations. Many of the veterans were dead, and the Panzer Lehr of early 1945 bore little resemblance to that of June 1944.

The division was moved north, into the Rhineland, where it was engaged fighting Bernard Montgomery's Anglo-Canadian 21st Army Group again during Operation Veritable, serving under the First Parachute Army. Panzer Lehr saw very heavy fighting, and again sustained heavy losses. By 15 March, Panzer Lehr had only 6 Panzer IVs, 29 Panthers and 14 Jagdpanzer IVs available. When the U.S. 9th Armored Division captured the Ludendorff Bridge at Remagen, Panzer Lehr was sent to crush the bridgehead. The attack was unsuccessful. The Allies' ground and air superiority inflicted heavy casualties on the division. By then, it was reduced to just 300 men and 15 tanks. Engaged in a fighting retreat across northwestern Germany, the division was trapped in the Ruhr Pocket and the remnants of the once powerful division were taken prisoner by the US 99th Infantry Division on 15 April.

== Order of battle ==
- Panzer-Lehr-Regiment 130
- Panzergrenadier-Lehr-Regiment 901
- Panzergrenadier-Lehr-Regiment 902
- Panzer-Artillerie-Regiment 130
- Feldersatz-Bataillon 130
- Panzeraufklärungs-Lehr-Abteilung 130
- Heeres-Flak-Artillerie-Abteilung 311
- Panzerjäger-Abteilung 130
- Panzer-Lehr-Pionier-Bataillon 130
- Panzernachrichten-Abteilung 130
- Panzer-Versorgungstruppen 130

== Commanders ==
No.	Portrait	Commander	Took office	Left office	Time in office
1	Fritz Bayerlein	Generalleutnant; Fritz Bayerlein (1899–1970)	10 January 1944	8 June 1944	4 months
2	Hyacinth Graf Strachwitz	Generalmajor; Hyacinth Graf Strachwitz (1893–1968)	8 June 1944	23 August 1944	2 months
3	Rudolf Gerhardt	Oberst; Rudolf Gerhardt (1896–1964)	24 August 1944	8 September 1944	0 months
4	Paul Freiherr von Hauser	Oberst; Paul Freiherr von Hauser (1911–1999)	8 September 1944	September 1944	0 months
(1)	Fritz Bayerlein	Generalleutnant; Fritz Bayerlein (1899–1970)	September 1944	15 January 1945	4 months
5	Horst Niemack	Generalmajor; Horst Niemack (1909–1992)	15 January 1945	3 April 1945	2 months
(4)	Paul Freiherr von Hauser	Oberst; Paul Freiherr von Hauser (1911–1999)	4 April 1945	15 April 1945	11 days

== Bibliography ==
Books

- Badsey, Stephen (1990). Normandy 1944 Allied Landings and Breakout. United Kingdom: Osprey Publishing. ISBN 978-0-85045-921-0.
- Battistelli, Pier Paolo (2013). Panzer Divisions 1944–45 Battle Orders. United Kingdom: Bloomsbury Publishing. ISBN 978-1-84908-084-2.
- Bergstrom, Christer (2014). The Ardennes, 1944-1945 Hitler's Winter Offensive. Havertown, Pennsylvania: Casemate. ISBN 978-1-61200-315-3.
- Blumenson, Martin (1961), Breakout and Pursuit (Publication 7-5), archived from the original on October 31, 2011
- Caddick-Adams, Peter (2015). Snow and Steel: Battle of the Bulge 1944-45. United States: Random House. ISBN 978-0-09-958812-2.
- Clarke, Jeffrey J. (1993), Riviera to the Rhine (Publication 7-10)
- Cole, Hugh M. (1993) [1950]. The Lorraine Campaign. United States Army in World War II: The European Theater of Operations. Washington DC: Center of Military History United States Army. LCCN 50-60957. CMH Pub 7–6–1. Archived from the original on October 31, 2011.
- Cole, Hugh M. (1965) [1993]. The Ardennes: Battle of the Bulge. United States Army in World War II: The European Theater of Operations. Washington DC: Center of Military History United States Army. LCCN 65-60001. CMH Pub 7–8–1.
- Copp, J. T.; Vogel, Robert (1988). Maple leaf route: victory. Maple Leaf Route. ISBN 978-0-919907-06-5.
- Edwards, Robert (2014). Scouts Out: A History of German Armored Reconnaissance Units in World War II. Mechanicsburg, Pennsylvania: Stackpole Books. ISBN 978-0-8117-1311-5.
- Ford, Ken (2004). Caen 1944 Montgomery's Breakout Attempt. United Kingdom: Osprey Publishing. ISBN 978-1-84176-625-6.
- Forty, G. (2004). Villers Bocage. Battle Zone Normandy. Sutton Publishing. ISBN 0-7509-3012-8.
- Harrison, Gordon A. (2002), The Cross Channel Attack (Publication 7-4), archived from the original on February 26, 2014
- Jentz, Thomas (1996). Panzertruppen Vol. 2 The Complete Guide to the Creation & Combat Employment of Germany's Tank Force 1943-1945. Atglen, PA: Schiffer Publishing Ltd. ISBN 978-0-7643-0080-6.
- MacDonald, Charles B. (1973). The Last Offensive (PDF). Washington, DC: Office of the Chief of Military History, Department of the Army. Archived from the original (PDF) on September 27, 2012.
- Mitcham, Samuel (2001). The Panzer Legions: A Guide to the German Army Tank Divisions of World War II and Their Commanders. Greenwood Press. ISBN 978-0-313-31640-1.
- Mitcham, Samuel W. (2006). The Panzer Legions: A Guide to the German Army Tank Divisions of World War II and Their Commanders. Mechanicsburg, Pennsylvania: Stackpole Books. ISBN 978-0-8117-3353-3.
- Quarrie, Bruce (2000). The Ardennes Offensive Central Sector: V Panzer Armee. University Park, Illinois, USA: Osprey Publishing. ISBN 978-1-85532-857-0.
- Ritgen, Helmut (1995). The Western Front 1944 - Memoirs of a Panzer Lehr Officer. Winnipeg, Canada: J.J. Fedorowicz Publishing. ISBN 978-0-921991-28-1.
- Ritgen, Helmut (2001). Panzer Lehr in the West: A History of the Panzer Lehr Division, 1943-1945. USA: Shelf Books. ISBN 978-1-899765-18-8.
- Schneider, Wolfgang (2004). Tigers in Combat (Volume 1 ed.). Mechanicsburg, Pennsylvania: Stackpole Books. ISBN 978-0-8117-3203-1.
- Steinhardt, F. P., ed. (2008). Panzer Lehr Division 1944–45. Helion WWII German Military Studies. Vol. I. Solihull, West Midlands: Helion. ISBN 978-1-874622-28-4. OCLC 60514050.
- Thomas, Nigel (2000). The German Army 1939-45 (5): Western Front 1943-45. United Kingdom: Osprey Publishing. ISBN 978-1-85532-797-9.
- Wilmot, H.P (1984). June 1944. New York: Blandford Press. ISBN 978-0-7137-1446-3.
- Zaloga, Steven J. (2015). Panzer IV vs Sherman: France 1944. United Kingdom: Bloomsbury Publishing. ISBN 978-1-4728-0761-8.
- Zetterling, N. (2000). Normandy 1944: German Military Organization, Combat Power and Organizational Effectiveness. Winnipeg, Man.: Fedorowicz. ISBN 978-0-921991-56-4. Archived from the original on 17 February 2009.

Websites

- Nafziger, George. "German Army, Battle of the Bulge, 15 December 1944" (PDF). Combined Arms Research Library Digital Library. US Army Combined Arms Center. Archived from the original (PDF) on 1 July 2015.
- Nafziger, George. "Organizational History of the German Armored Formations 1939-1945" (PDF). Combined Arms Research Library Digital Library. US Army Combined Arms Center. Archived from the original (PDF) on 8 December 2011.
- Niehorster, Leo. "Panzer Lehr Division Order of Battle". World War II Armed Forces Orders of Battle and Organizations.
- US Army Situation maps - The Battle of the Bulge. American Memory. Library of Congress.
