= Kriegsschule (Germany) =

Military school

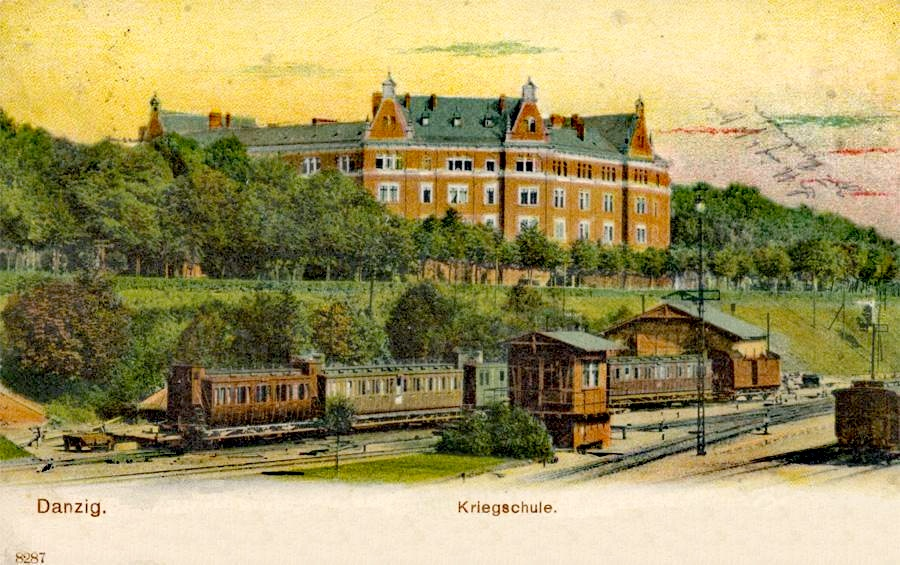
A historic illustration of the school in Danzig

A Kriegsschule was a general military school used for basic officer training and higher education in Germany starting in as early as the 17th century. There have been many Kriegsakademies (War academy), Kriegsschulen (War Schools), or even Ritterakademies (Knight academy) in Germany.

== Origins ==
The institutions were originally created to correct the defective education of the aristocracy because the knight order complained, "the young noblemen were too quickly tired of schools and studies show that even those who would choose to war over the necessity and the complaints are too easily fatigued and returned home."

After the Seven Years' War (1756-1763), Frederick II was faced with the task of reorganizing and refreshing the army. Due to the war in all of the European countries, it became obvious that the education of the officers was lacking. It was believed that the experience of war taught all that was necessary. After the war, the Germans recognized the importance of science education and new educational facilities were constructed.

After the rise of a money economy and cities, mercenary troops and city-state militias appeared. Mercenary leaders were taught by a kind of apprenticeship system. However, as Machiavelli had noted, the independent mercenary troops were militarily inefficient. Feudal monarchs, and also the bourgeoisie, wanted a more reliable military force and system of command.

In 1765, Frederick II built the Académie des Nobles (also Académie militaire) in Berlin. There young nobles were trained for military and civil service. The classes related to history, geography, philosophy, rhetoric, geometry, fortification, grammar, French, drill, dancing and horseback riding. The students went either directly to the academy or to the cadet schools. The twelve best graduates Frederick took to Potsdam to personally train in the higher art of war (Kriegskunst). These officers were the squad for staff officers.

After the king died in 1786, this tradition continued as one of secondary education until 1801. Selected participants from the "Academy for young officers of infantry and cavalry," was formed. However, after the end of first year in June 1804 became a fixed organization as an institution. The training consisted of a three-year course. From 1 September to 31 March was taught in the school while the rest of the year the officers did their service in military units. The overall management of the school was up to the Quartermaster General (precursor of the Chief of Staff) of the army. This academy was closed at the outbreak of the War of the Fourth Coalition (1806) and as a result of the defeat, it was not to be reopened.

== 19th Century ==
After the war of 1806/07 began in Prussia, the reforms of the military system began. By a cabinet order of 3 In May 1810, additional to the three Kriegsschulen (Berlin, Königsberg, Breslau) were established to train officers. The Prussian Military Academy in Berlin was founded by Gerhard von Scharnhorst in October 1810, originally the Allgemeine Kriegsschule, for the Prussian state. The military college was for the training of staff officers, and was in its original form until 1914. The Prussian Military Academy is distinguished from the military schools (weapons schools), which mediated genre-specific skills and weapons of the military academies, the cadets were preparing for the officer examination (Lieutenant). The military school in Berlin was also responsible for the training of officers in charge. The department offered a three-year course of nine months of lessons, while the other three months were devoted to in service activities or practical exercises. The training included the military sciences, mathematics, chemistry, physics and languages. Admission to the course has been made subject to verification, and later from a previous three-year term. The number of participants was limited to 55.

During the liberation war from 1813 to 1815, the military school was closed. In 1816 it was named "Allgemeine Kriegsschule" and reopened. It was now completely separated from lower education (these were now called brigade schools, schools later Division) and received the status of a university. Since 1 October 1859 it was called - by a cabinet order of 19 August 1858 - officially the Königlich Preußische Kriegsakademie or "Royal Prussian Military Academy."

== 20th Century ==
The Kriegsakademien (War Academies) were used in Prussian-German army until 1914. The Kriegsakademie moved locations several times within Berlin. Initially it was housed in a building on Castle Road. Then they moved into a Schinkel on 'Unter den Linden', later extended by a rear building on Dorotheenstraße. This four-story brick building built in 1879-1883 consisted of the front building and an abutment. In the building, there were classrooms, offices, an area for war games, a library, and stables. It was open until the outbreak of World War I. From 1935 to 1939, the Academy was elsewhere. In the Krupp (Berlin-Moabit), it reopened.

The Kriegsakademie (War Academy) was originally established by the military as a kind of university which encouraged higher education and military training in the army. In later times it narrowed curriculum at the expense of general education subjects to more and more on the military sciences. The Kriegsakademie was open in principle to each officer, as participation was based on voluntary reporting. Acceptance conditions were based on a three-year prior service record, good health, in addition to being knowledgeable with scientific endeavors, special equipment, and skills were needed and pass the entrance exam. Before the applicant could take the required entrance exam, had to confirm with the regimental commander the character and professional competence of the aspirant. This process was also often used for social selection (good old Prussian replacement desired circles- or good old boys). In the Regiment, preparations were made for the entrance examination. As a rule, only graduates of the academy transferred to the General Staff, or could even exercise the Magisterium. Subjects were all military science, languages, and general historical and mathematical sciences.

All Wehrmacht officers in World War II had passed through a Kriegsschule during their training. The Wehrmacht had five Kriegsschulen: at Potsdam, Dresden, München, Hannover in a building (1842/43) formerly called 'Kadettenanstalt' and later (since 1867) 'Preußische Kriegsschule' and Wiener-Neustadt.

Officer candidates, known as Fahnenjunker undertook an extensive eight-week course, aimed at giving them a good knowledge of the basics of command. After completion of the course, the officer candidate moved off to his chosen Truppenschule or branch of service school. An example of a Truppenschule is Panzertruppenschule I in Munster, but there were also schools catering for all branches of service. Engineers, physicians and veterinarians studied longer at a military Akademie instead of progressing to a military branch school.

== See also ==
- Military training
- Military officer
- Heer
- Wehrmacht
- Panzerwaffe
- Panzertruppenschule I
- Panzertruppenschule II
- Panzertruppenschule Kama
