= Gert Schwabl von Gordon =

German classical riding instructor, horse trainer and author

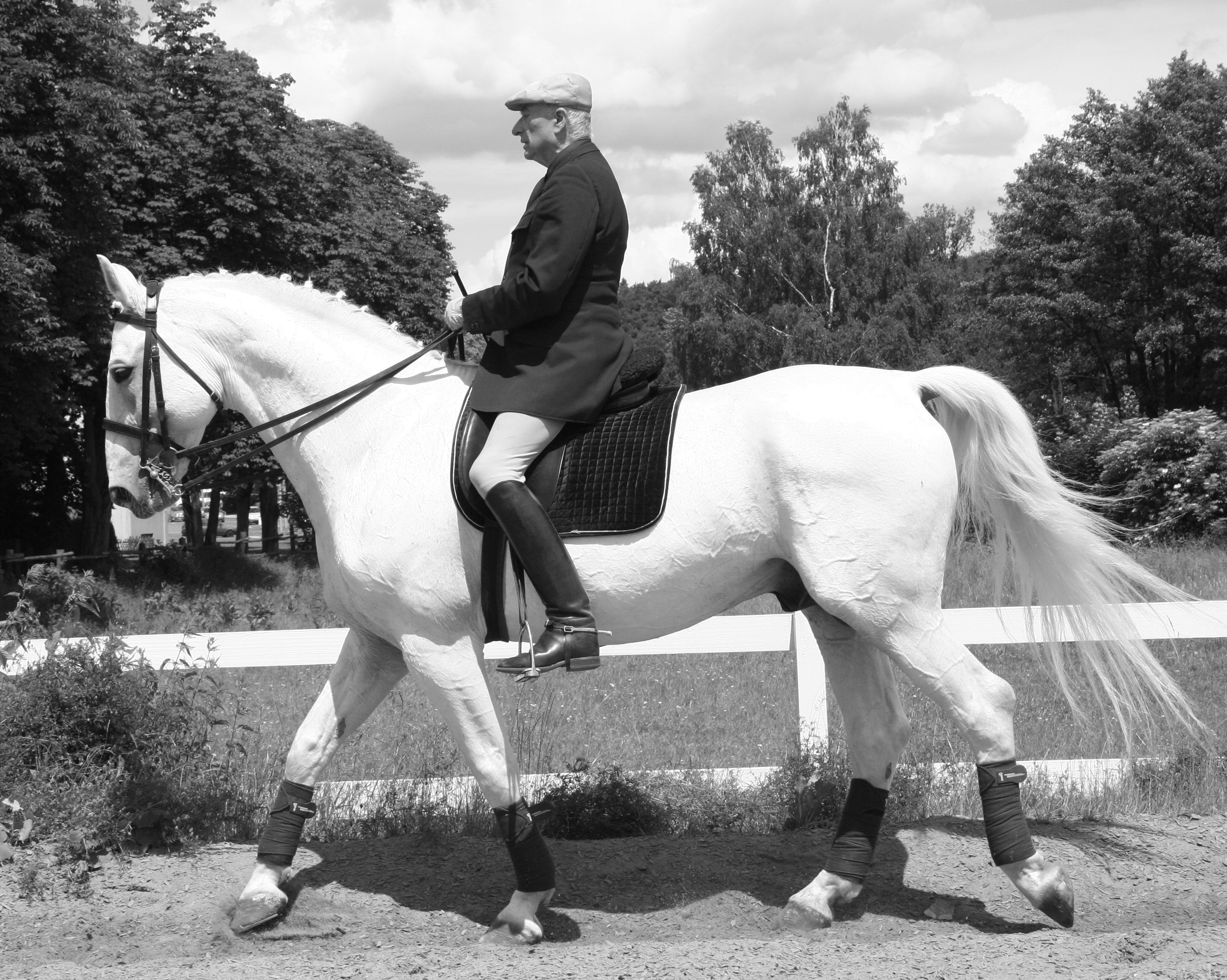

Gert Schwabl von Gordon (1928–2021) was a German classical riding instructor, horse instructor and author. For him, the definition of classical riding theory was based on the riding regulations of 1926. He was a state-certified riding instructor and ran his own riding training institute in Nuremberg for over forty years.

== Life ==
Gert Schwabl von Gordon was born in 1928. He was trained as a rider according to the riding regulations, as they were taught in the heyday of the Hanover Cavalry School by his father Walter Schwabl, who worked as a riding instructor and rider at the Hanover Cavalry School for almost four years and was scheduled to attend the 1928 Olympics. (which he was unable to attend due to an accident) He learned the technical language and system of riding regulations from his father, which can also be found in other classics such as those by Waldemar Seunig. Gert Schwabl von Gordon recorded this knowledge of the correct explanation of technical terms, the system of gymnastics for the horse and the exercises that were already ridden at the Hanover Cavalry School at that time and are still relevant for horse training in his first book.

He himself had tournament successes up to the highest class.

Gert Schwabl von Gordon was an advocate of classical riding theory. He followed Horst Niemack's motto, "In classical teaching there is nothing new to invent, only the old to preserve," and did not allow any deviations from classical riding theory.

Gert Schwabl von Gordon placed particular emphasis on combating riding behind the vertical. Another focus of his work was the rider's seat and riding over the seat. To do this, he had his students ride a lot with one-handed reins.

Because he contracted diphtheria as a child, Gert Schwabl von Gordon was not drafted into the military in World War II. In 1945 he caught one of three military horses running freely through the village. He bought his first horse, a trotter, at a horse market.

Gert Schwabl von Gordon worked as a teacher throughout his life in addition to riding. In 1956 he passed his first teaching examination. In 1973 he acquired a riding facility in Nuremberg-Worzeldorf, which he called the Nuremberg Riding Institute. Before that, he worked as a riding instructor in Kitzingen, Marienberg, Burgfarrnbach, and Hainstadt near Miltenberg. In 1976, he moved to his facility in Nuremberg-Worzeldorf, where he lived until his death. He built a second hall next to the existing riding hall. He named it the Buko Hall in honor of his wife Alma, who came from Bukovina and whom he called Buko. At the facility, he taught jumping and dressage on private and teaching horses, for many years alongside his work as a permanent teacher at a school after work hours, and when he retired, he taught full-time. He also founded the Association for the Promotion of Classical Riding and his establishment was recognized as an apprenticeship employer for horse managers (Pferdewirt) specializing in riding.

Back in the 1990s, Gert Schwabl von Gordon warned of the wrong developments in horse riding. But he was not heard and his unwanted warning made him unpopular. In his efforts to preserve the classical riding theory, he also came into contact with Egon von Neindorff, at whose event he gave a lecture. He was still in the saddle himself until the age of 85.

Gert Schwabl von Gordon died on January 14, 2021, in Nuremberg-Worzeldorf. He was buried in the family grave in Würzburg.

Gert Schwabl's companion is riding teacher Johan L.Huber (born September 2, 1942), master horseman (Pferdewirtschaftsmeister) and operator of the Wendelstein equestrian center since 1986.[3] Johan L. Huber received riding lessons from First Lieutenant Walter Schwabl, who was considered one of the best riders in Germany. Johan L. Huber was so impressed by his skills that he remained a loyal student of Gordon's son Gert Schwabl until the end.

== Awards ==
The Bavarian State Sports Association awarded him the silver pin of merit for special services to sport.

== Veröffentlichungen ==
- Schwabl von Gordon, Gert; Rieskamp, Bianca: Die klassische Reitlehre in der Praxis gemäß der H.Dv.12, Olms Verlag, Hildesheim 2011
- Schwabl von Gordon, Gert; Elisabeth, D´Antoni (Übersetzt von): Classical Dressage Training in Practice according to the H.Dv.12
- Schwabl von Gordon, Gert: 300 reiterliche Fragen und ihre Beantwortung im Sinne der klassischen Reitlehre H.D.12, Olms Verlag, Hildesheim 2015
- Schwabl von Gordon, Gert; Rieskamp, Bianca: Ein Leben für die klassische Reitlehre, Olms Verlag, Hildesheim 2017
