= Fritz Bayerlein =

German general (1899–1970)

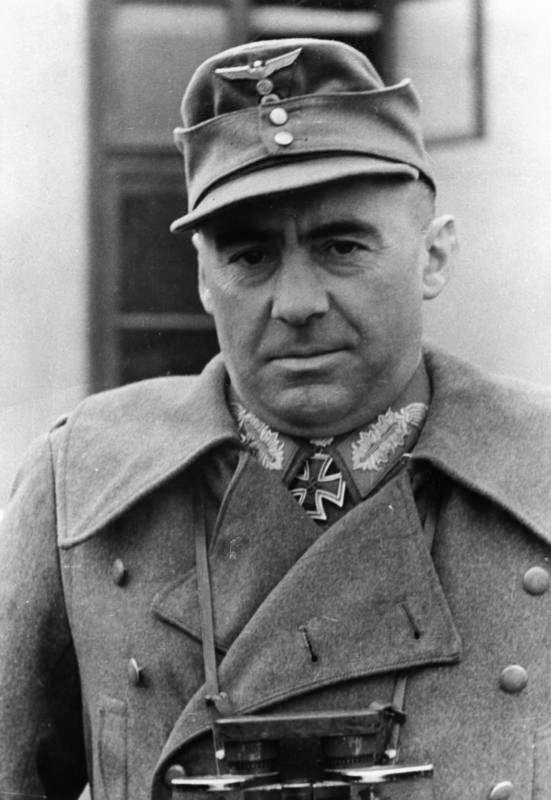
- Bayerlein in 1944
- Born: 14 January 1899; Würzburg, German Empire
- Died: 30 January 1970 (aged 71); Würzburg, West Germany
- Military career
- Allegiance: German Empire; Weimar Republic; Nazi Germany
- Branch: German Army
- Service years: 1917–1945
- Rank: Generalleutnant
- Commands: 3rd Panzer Division; Panzer Lehr Division; LIII Army Corps
- Conflicts: World War I; World War II; Invasion of Poland; Battle of Alam Halfa; Ardennes Offensive
- Awards: Knight's Cross of the Iron Cross with Oak Leaves and Swords

Fritz Hermann Michael Bayerlein (14 January 1899 – 30 January 1970) was a German general in the Wehrmacht, during World War II. He initially served as a staff officer, including with Erwin Rommel in the Afrika Korps. He then commanded the 3rd Panzer Division, the Panzer Lehr Division and LIII Army Corps (Wehrmacht) in the European theatre. Bayerlein was a recipient of the Knight's Cross of the Iron Cross with Oak Leaves and Swords. Prior to the second world war, Bayerlein served in the 9th Bavarian Reserve Division in 1917.

== Wehrmacht military career ==
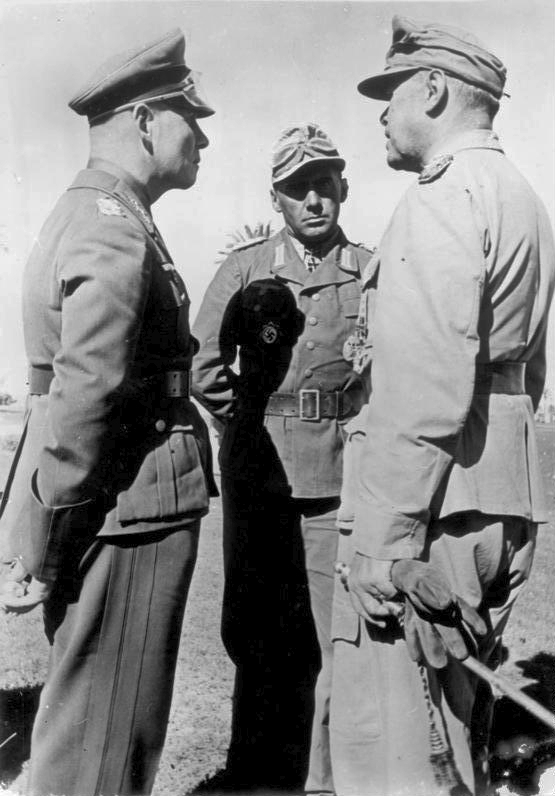
Rommel, Bayerlein (center), and Albert Kesselring.

Bayerlein served as a staff officer of General Heinz Guderian for the invasion of Poland and the Battle of France. In Operation Barbarossa, the invasion of the Soviet Union, during June 1941, Bayerlein was assigned to Guderian's Panzer Group 2 staff. After the Battle of Kiev, Bayerlein was transferred to Generaloberst Erwin Rommel's staff. Bayerlein was moved to the Führerreserve in August 1942, then reassigned to the Afrika Korps as Chief of Staff.

He served as a staff officer under the command of Generalmajor Walter Nehring beginning in March 1942 upon Nehring's transfer to Africa. Later, he served under Erwin Rommel and Wilhelm von Thoma. When Rommel left Tunisia in March 1943 after the failed attack during the Battle of Medenine (whose German code title was "Operation Capri"), Bayerlein was appointed German liaison officer under the new commander, Italian Giovanni Messe. He was sent to Italy before the German troops in Tunisia surrendered on 12 May 1943, and then, in October 1943, to the Eastern Front to lead the 3rd Panzer Division that was surrounded at Kirovograd. Bayerlein led a breakout through the Soviet encirclement.

He was reassigned to command the Panzer Lehr Division, which moved to Normandy on 7 June 1943. During the Allied Operation Cobra, Allied bombing near Saint-Lô decimated the division, whose remnants slipped out of the Falaise pocket in August 1944 and moved east, toward Vire. The division, after a few months, took part in the Ardennes Offensive, in December 1944, as part of the XLVII Panzer Corps; following the failure of the offensive, Bayerlein was relieved of command. In February 1945, he was called to command the LIII Army Corps (Wehrmacht), which he surrendered to the U.S. Army in the Ruhr Pocket on 19 April 1945.

== After the war ==
Bayerlein was a prisoner of war from April 1945 through April 1947. During this time, he and many other generals in Allied captivity wrote the European battle histories for the U.S. Army Historical Division. Bayerlein was released in 1947. He wrote about military subjects and continued his work for the Historical Division. He died in 1970. Bayerlein is credited as a technical advisor for the 1961 film, The Guns of Navarone.

== Awards ==
- Iron Cross (1914) 2nd Class (30 August 1918) & 2nd Class (13 September 1939)
- Iron Cross (1939) 1st Class (27 September 1939)
- German Cross in Gold on 23 October 1942 as Oberst in the General Staff in the Deutsches Afrika-Korps
- Knight's Cross of the Iron Cross with Oak Leaves and Swords
  - Knight's Cross on 26 December 1941 as Oberstleutnant in the General Staff and Chief of the General Staff of the DAK
  - 258th Oak Leaves on 6 July 1943 as Generalmajor and German Chief of Staff of the 1st Italian Army
  - 81st Swords on 20 July 1944 as Generalleutnant and commander of the Panzer-Lehr-Division

Military offices
Preceded by General der Panzertruppe Walther Nehring	Acting Commander of Afrika Korps; 31 August 1942	Succeeded by General der Panzertruppe Gustav von Vaerst
Preceded by Generalleutnant Franz Westhoven	Commander of 3. Panzer-Division; 25 October 1943 – 5 January 1944	Succeeded by Oberst Rudolf Lang
Preceded by none	Commander of Panzer-Lehr-Division; 10 January 1944 – August 1944	Succeeded by Oberst Rudolf Gerhardt
Preceded by Oberst Paul Freiherr von Hauser	Commander of Panzer-Lehr-Division; September 1944 – 15 January 1945	Succeeded by Generalmajor Horst Niemack
Preceded by Generalleutnant Walter Botsch	Commander of LIII. Armeekorps; 24 March 1945 - 15 April 1945	Succeeded by None
