= Paul Freiherr von Hauser =

Nazi officer (1911–1999)

- Born: 24 April 1911; Graz, Austria-Hungary
- Died: 1 April 1999 (aged 87)
- Military career
- Allegiance: First Austrian Republic; Nazi Germany
- Branch: German Army
- Service years: 1930–1945
- Rank: Oberst
- Commands: Panzer Lehr Division
- Conflicts: World War II; Invasion of Poland; Battle of France; Operation Barbarossa; Battle of Białystok–Minsk; Battle of Kiev (1941); Battle of Moscow; Battle of the Caucasus; Third Battle of Kharkov; Battle of Kursk; Lower Dnieper Offensive; Dnieper–Carpathian Offensive; Cherkassy Pocket; First Jassy-Kishinev Offensive; Operation Overlord; Operation Cobra; Battle of the Bulge; Siege of Bastogne; Ruhr Pocket
- Awards: Knight's Cross of the Iron Cross with Oak Leaves

Paul Freiherr von Hauser (24 April 1911 – 1 April 1999) was an officer in the Wehrmacht during World War II who commanded the Panzer Lehr Division. He was a recipient of the Knight's Cross of the Iron Cross with Oak Leaves of Nazi Germany. Oberst (colonel) Hauser surrendered the division to the American forces in the Ruhr Pocket on April 15, 1945.

== Awards and decorations ==
- Iron Cross (1939) 2nd Class (3 November 1939) & 1st Class (1 August 1940)
- Honour Roll Clasp of the Army (5 October 1942)
- German Cross in Gold on 20 September 1942 as Hauptmann in Kradschützen-Battalion 61
- Knight's Cross of the Iron Cross with Oak Leaves
  - Knight's Cross on 25 January 1943 as Hauptmann and commander of Kradschützen-Battalion 61
  - 635th Oak Leaves on 28 October 1944 as Oberstleutnant and commander of Panzergrenadier-Lehr-Regiment 901

Military offices
Preceded by Oberst Rudolf Gerhardt	Commander of Panzer Lehr Division; September 1944	Succeeded by Generalleutnant Fritz Bayerlein
Preceded by Generalmajor Horst Niemack	Commander of Panzer Lehr Division; 4 April 1945 - 15 April 1945	Succeeded by None
