= Panzertruppenschule I =

School to train WWII German tank officers

Panzertruppenschule I (Armoured Troops School No.1) was the first of two major schools set up by the German Panzerwaffe before World War II to train German armour officers to operate Panzers (tanks). It was originally formed as the Kraftfahrkampftruppenschule on 1 October 1937 at Wünsdorf. A year later it was renamed to Panzertruppenschule.

The Panzertruppenschule was a 'branch school', where officer candidates were sent after 12–16 weeks spent in basic training, and having successfully undertaken an 8-week course at a Kriegsschule. Prospective Panzer troops in the rank of Fähnrich undertook a 16-week training course which aimed to familiarise the officer candidates with the nuances and workings of a Panzer, and also with the tactics to be used when commanding Panzers in the field.

Upon graduation, the recruit was promoted to Oberfähnrich and sent on field probation.

In June 1943, the only known flame-throwing versions of the StuG III, designated StuG III (Flamm) were delivered to the school, but were shortly thereafter destroyed by a fire started by a faulty flamethrower.

In late 1943, the school was stripped of its experienced instructors, who were used to form the élite Panzer Lehr Division.

== See also ==
- Panzerwaffe, Kriegsschule, Tanks in the German Army, Panzer division
- German Army (1935–1945), Wehrmacht, Panzerwaffe
- Panzertruppenschule II, Panzer Lehr Division
- Kama tank school
- Tigerfibel, the cartoon format training manual for the Tiger

== Bibliography ==
- Tessin, Georg. Verbände und Truppen der deutschen Wehrmacht und Waffen–SS im Zweiten Weltkrieg 1939–1945 [Units and Troops of the German Military and Waffen-SS in the Second World War 1939–1945] (in German). Vol. 2: Die Landstreitkräfte 1–5 (Ground Units 1–5). Osnabrück: Biblio.
