= Panzertruppenschule II =

School to train WWII German tank officers

Panzertruppenschule II (Armoured Troops School No.2) was originally formed as the Kavallerieschule (Cavalry School) at Krampnitz on 1 October 1937. It was renamed the Schule für Schnelle Truppen (School for Mobile Troops) on 26 June 1941.

It was the second of two major schools set up by the German Panzerwaffe in World War II to train German armour officers to operate Panzers.

The Panzertruppenschule was a 'branch school', where officer candidates were sent after 12–16 weeks spent in basic training and having successfully undertaken an 8-week course at a Kriegsschule. Prospective panzer troops, known as Fähnrich undertook a 16-week training course which aimed to familiarise the officer candidates with the nuances and workings of a Panzer, and also with the tactics to be used when commanding panzers in the field. Upon graduation, the recruit was promoted to Oberfähnrich and sent on field probation.

The instructors were chosen because of their skill, and many had seen action and received decorations.

In late 1943, the school was stripped of its experienced instructors, who were used to form the élite Panzer-Lehr-Division.

== See also ==
- Panzertruppenschule I, Panzer-Lehr-Division, Panzertruppenschule Kama

== Bibliography ==
- Tessin, Georg. Verbände und Truppen der deutschen Wehrmacht und Waffen–SS im Zweiten Weltkrieg 1939–1945 [Units and Troops of the German Military and Waffen-SS in the Second World War 1939–1945] (in German). Vol. 2: Die Landstreitkräfte 1–5 (Ground Units 1–5). Osnabrück: Biblio.
