= Vincent Jones (historian) =

American military historian

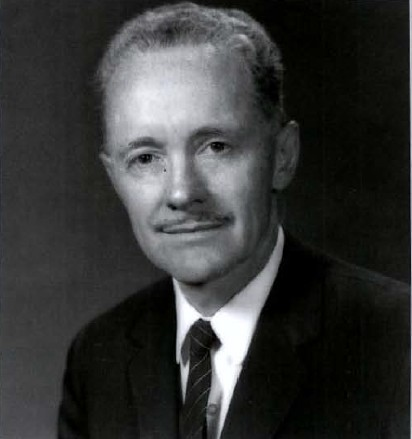
- Vincent Jones in September 1964
- Born: Vincent Clement Jones; 10 June 1915; Cozad, Nebraska
- Died: 22 July 2003 (aged 88); Bethesda, Maryland
- Burial place: Brooklyn, Connecticut
- Spouse: Katharine "Kay" Cox
- Children: 3

Academic background
- Education: Park College (B.A., 1937); University of Nebraska (M.A., 1938); University of Wisconsin–Madison (Ph.D., 1952)
- Thesis: Austrian social and labor legislation in the era of Taaffe, 1879-1893 (1952)

Academic work
- Institutions: United States Army Center of Military History
- Notable works: Manhattan: The Army and the Bomb

Vincent Clement Jones (10 June 1915 – 22 July 2003) was an American military historian. He worked at the United States Army Center of Military History from 1955 to 1986 and was the author of Manhattan: The Army and the Bomb (1985), a volume in the United States Army in World War II series.

== Biography ==
Vincent Clement Jones was born in Cozad, Nebraska, on 10 June 1915. He entered Park College in Parkville, Missouri, a college his parents had attended, from whence he graduated with a Bachelor of Arts degree in 1937. While there he earned tuition money working as an usher at dances in Kansas City, Missouri. He went on to earn a Master of Arts degree from the University of Nebraska the following year, writing a thesis on German public opinion in World War I. He then spent a year as a Sanders Institute fellow in History at George Washington University, before entering the University of Wisconsin to pursue his Ph.D. in European history shortly before the outbreak of World War II in Europe. While there, he met his future wife, Katharine "Kay" Cox, a 1941 graduate of Wellesley College.

In 1942, shortly after he completed the coursework for his degree, Jones was drafted into the United States Army, became a non-commissioned officer in a heavy weapons company in the 81st Infantry Division. The division received desert warfare training before being shipped to the Pacific. He participated in the Battle of Angaur, the Battle of Peleliu and the Battle of Leyte, where the division staged for the invasion of Japan. The end of the war rendered this unnecessary, and the he participated in the occupation of Japan instead. He was discharged from the Army in December 1945.

Jones returned to the United States, where he married Kay in Winnetka, Illinois, where she was teaching at the Dushkin School of Music. They had three sons, Daniel, Kevin and Douglas. The couple moved to Chicago, where he pursued his thesis research supported by the G.I. Bill, while Kay worked in the Manhattan Project's Metallurgical Laboratory. He taught at the University of Wisconsin campuses in Racine, and Wausau before finally completing his Ph.D. at the University of Wisconsin–Madison in February 1952, writing his thesis on "Austrian social and labor legislation in the era of Taaffe, 1879-1893". He then became a research associate in American history with the State Historical Society of Wisconsin and an assistant professor of history at the Central Connecticut State College.

In January 1955, Jones joined the staff of the United States Army Center of Military History, where he remained until he retired in 1986. While there he worked on The Army Almanac and wrote the chapters on America's "Emergence to World Power, 1898-1902" and the Army's "Transition and Change, 1902-1917" in the ROTC textbook American Military History. He also authored articles and reviews in professional historical journals. His major work was Manhattan: The Army and the Atomic Bomb, a volume in the United States Army in World War II series, which received a Blue Pencil Award from the National Association of Government Communicators in a presentation at the National Press Club on 3 June 1986. Historian Russell F. Weigley wrote in a review for The Washington Post: "For its encyclopedic telling of the details of that story, Jones' book will stand as an indispensable contribution to the history of the atomic age."

Jones was an active member of the American Historical Association, the American Military Institute, the History of Science Society, the American Federation of Government Employees, the Society for History in the Federal Government and the Commission on Military History. He was also a member of the National Audubon Society, the Wilson Ornithological Society and the Maryland Ornithological Society.

Jones died from a pulmonary embolism at Suburban Hospital in Bethesda, Maryland, on 22 July 2003, and was buried at Old Trinity Church Cemetery in Brooklyn, Connecticut, four days later.
