= United States Army in World War II =

Official WW II history series

United States Army in World War II is the official history of the ground forces of the United States Army during World War II. The 78-volume work was originally published beginning in 1946.

== Overview ==
The work describes and to a degree evaluates the ground operations of the Army in 21 volumes. Additional volumes address grand strategy; recruitment, organization, and training; the service forces; the technical services; and special studies; again almost exclusively those of the ground forces. Three additional volumes provide a pictorial account. (Air operations, logistics, and training are presented in a separate seven-volume series, The Army Air Forces in World War II.) Different authors or teams wrote most of the accounts, though some authors wrote more than one. Most of the authors were serving or retired officers though enlisted personnel and professional historians also contributed.

The volumes devoted to operations are grouped by theater and campaign. (See the list of titles below.) Battles are described at a unit level appropriate to the size of the engagement. In some cases authors detail the actions of units as small as an infantry company, though most battles are presented at the battalion or regimental level. Many accounts of individual heroism are included, especially actions which resulted in the award of the Medal of Honor.

Each volume includes some photographs. Operations volumes include small maps within the text and larger fold-out maps attached inside the back cover. All operations volumes include bibliographical notes, a glossary, a list of code names, and a list of military map symbols. Some include additional features such as a table of equivalent U.S. and German, Italian, or Japanese ranks.

More than two-thirds of the volumes of the history are devoted to subjects other than actual operations. (See the list of titles below.) These provide information which is not appropriate for a purely operational history but is important for an understanding of the Army's activities as a whole during the war.

== Contents ==
THE WAR DEPARTMENT

Title	Author(s)	Year Published
Chief of Staff: Prewar Plans and Preparations	Mark Skinner Watson	1950
Washington Command Post: The Operations Division	Ray S. Cline	1951
Strategic Planning for Coalition Warfare: 1941–1942	Maurice Matloff and Edwin M. Snell	1953
Strategic Planning for Coalition Warfare: 1943–1944	Maurice Matloff	1959
Global Logistics and Strategy: 1940–1943	Richard M. Leighton and Robert W. Coakley	1955
Global Logistics and Strategy: 1944–1945	Robert W. Coakley and Richard M. Leighton	1968
The Army and Economic Mobilization	R. Elberton Smith	1959
The Army and Industrial Manpower	Byron Fairchild and Jonathan Grossman	1959

THE ARMY GROUND FORCES

Title	Author(s)	Year Published
The Organization of Ground Combat Troops	Kent Roberts Greenfield, Robert R. Palmer, and Bell I. Wiley	1947
The Procurement and Training of Ground Combat Troops	Robert R. Palmer, Bell I. Wiley, and William R. Keast	1948

THE ARMY SERVICE FORCES

Title	Author(s)	Year Published
The Organization and Role of the Army Service Forces	John David Millett	1954

THE WESTERN HEMISPHERE

Title	Author(s)	Year Published
The Framework of Hemisphere Defense	Stetson Conn and Byron Fairchild	1960
Guarding the United States and its Outposts	Stetson Conn, Rose C. Engelman, and Byron Fairchild	1964

THE WAR IN THE PACIFIC

Title	Author(s)	Year Published
Strategy and Command: The First Two Years	Louis Morton	1962
The Fall of the Philippines	Louis Morton	1953
Guadalcanal: The First Offensive	John Miller	1949
Victory in Papua	Samuel Milner	1957
CARTWHEEL: The Reduction of Rabaul	John Miller	1959
Seizure of the Gilberts and Marshalls	Philip A. Crowl and Edmund G. Love	1955
Campaign in the Marianas	Philip A. Crowl	1960
The Approach to the Philippines	Robert Ross Smith	1953
Leyte: The Return to the Philippines	M. Hamlin Cannon	1954
Triumph in the Philippines	Robert Ross Smith	1963
Okinawa: The Last Battle	Roy E. Appleman, James M. Burns, Russell A. Gugeler, and John Stevens	1948

THE MEDITERRANEAN THEATER OF OPERATIONS

Title	Author(s)	Year Published
Northwest Africa: Seizing the Initiative in the West	George F. Howe	1957
Sicily and the Surrender of Italy	Albert N. Garland and Howard McGaw Smyth	1965
Salerno to Cassino	Martin Blumenson	1969
Cassino to the Alps	Ernest F. Fisher, Jr.	1977

THE EUROPEAN THEATER OF OPERATIONS

Title	Author(s)	Year Published
The Supreme Command	Forrest C. Pogue	1954
Cross-Channel Attack	Gordon A. Harrison	1951
Breakout and Pursuit	Martin Blumenson	1961
The Lorraine Campaign	Hugh M. Cole	1950
The Siegfried Line Campaign	Charles B. MacDonald	1963
The Ardennes: Battle of the Bulge	Hugh M. Cole	1965
Riviera to the Rhine	Jeffrey J. Clarke and Robert Ross Smith	1992
The Last Offensive	Charles B. MacDonald	1973
Logistical Support of the Armies, Volume I	Roland G. Ruppenthal	1953
Logistical Support of the Armies, Volume II	Roland G. Ruppenthal	1959

THE MIDDLE EAST THEATER

Title	Author(s)	Year Published
The Persian Corridor and Aid to Russia	Thomas Hubbard Vail Motter	1952

THE CHINA-BURMA-INDIA THEATER

Title	Author(s)	Year Published
Stillwell’s Mission to China	Charles F. Romanus and Riley Sunderland	1953
Stillwell’s Command Problems	Charles F. Romanus and Riley Sunderland	1956
Time Runs Out in CBI	Charles F. Romanus and Riley Sunderland	1959

THE TECHNICAL SERVICES

Title	Author(s)	Year Published
The Chemical Warfare Service: Organizing for War	Leo P. Brophy and George J. B. Fisher	1959
The Chemical Warfare Service: From Laboratory to Field	Leo P. Brophy, Wyndham D. Miles, and Rexmond C. Cochrane	1959
The Chemical Warfare Service: Chemicals in Combat	Brooks E. Kleber and Dale Birdsell	1966
The Corps of Engineers: Troops and Equipment	Blanche D. Coll, Jean E. Keith, and Herbert H. Rosenthal	1958
The Corps of Engineers: Construction in the United States	Lenore Fine and Jesse A. Remington	1972
The Corps of Engineers: The War against Japan	Karl C. Dod	1966
The Corps of Engineers: The War Against Germany	Alfred M. Beck, Abe Bortz, Charles W. Lynch, Lida Mayo, and Ralph F. Weld	1985
The Medical Department: Hospitalization and Evacuation, Zone of the Interior	Clarence McKittrick Smith	1956
The Medical Department: Medical Service in the Mediterranean and Minor Theaters	Charles M. Wiltse	1965
The Medical Department: Medical Service in the European Theater of Operations	Graham A. Cosmas and Albert E. Cowdrey	1992
The Medical Department: Medical Service in the War against Japan	Mary Ellen Condon-Rall and Albert E. Cowdrey	1998
The Ordnance Department: Planning Munitions for War	Constance McLaughlin Green, Harry C. Thomson, and Peter C. Roots	1955
The Ordnance Department: Procurement and Supply	Harry C. Thomson and Lida Mayo	1960
The Ordnance Department: On Beachhead and Battlefront	Lida Mayo	1968
The Quartermaster Corps: Organization, Supply, and Services, Volume I	Erna Risch	1953
The Quartermaster Corps: Organization, Supply, and Services, Volume II	Erna Risch and Chester L. Kieffer	1955
The Quartermaster Corps: Operations in the War against Japan	Alvin P. Stauffer	1956
The Quartermaster Corps: Operations in the War against Germany	William F. Ross and Charles F. Romanus	1965
The Signal Corps: The Emergency (to December 1941)	Dulany Terrett	1956
The Signal Corps: The Test (December 1941 to July 1943)	George Raynor Thompson, Dixie R. Harris, Pauline M. Oakes, and Dulany Terrett	1957
The Signal Corps: The Outcome (mid-1943 through 1945)	George Raynor Thompson and Dixie R. Harris	1966
The Transportation Corps: Responsibilities, Organization, and Operations	Chester Wardlow	1951
The Transportation Corps: Movements, Training, and Supply	Chester Wardlow	1956
The Transportation Corps: Operations Overseas	Joseph Bykofsky and Harold Larson	1957

SPECIAL STUDIES

Title	Author(s)	Year Published
Chronology: 1941–1945	Mary H. Williams	1960
Buying Aircraft: Matériel Procurement for the Army Air Forces	I. B. Holley	1964
Civil Affairs: Soldiers Become Governors	Harry L. Coles and Albert K. Weinberg	1964
The Employment of Negro Troops	Ulysses Lee	1966
Military Relations between the United States and Canada, 1939–1945	Stanlye W. Dziuban	1959
Rearming the French	Marcel Vigneras	1957
Three Battles: Arnaville, Altuzzo, and Schmidt	Charles B. MacDonald and Sidney T. Mathews	1952
The Women's Army Corps	Mattie E. Treadwell	1953
Manhattan: The Army and the Atomic Bomb	Vincent C. Jones	1985

PICTORIAL RECORD

Title	Author(s)	Year Published
The War against Germany and Italy: Mediterranean and Adjacent Areas	John C. Hatlem and Kenneth E. Hunter	1951
The War against Germany: Europe and Adjacent Areas	Kenneth E. Hunter	1951
The War against Japan	Kenneth E. Hunter and Margaret E. Tackley	1952

== Publication history ==
The works were first published by the Historical Division, Department of the Army, from March 28, 1950 called the Office of the Chief of Military History and from June 15, 1973, the Center of Military History. They are in a large format, 7¼” x 10”, with green cloth covers and no dust jackets. The cover has only the eagle insignia of the Army; the title, author, and other data are on the spine. Many volumes have been reprinted by the Center of Military History in the same format beginning in the 1980s, and most are available as PDF downloads.

The operations-oriented volumes and some others were reprinted by The National Historical Society during the 1990s in a 50th Anniversary Commemorative Edition series. They are 7” x 9” with a hard cover (without a dust jacket) whose face is a black-and-white photograph with the title superimposed. They omitted the original editions’ fold-out maps but instead printed them in two separate atlases.

Two volumes, ‘’Cross Channel Attack’’ and ‘’The Ardennes: Battle of the Bulge’’, were reprinted in the 1990s by Konecky & Konecky in a large 8½” by 11” format. They, too, omitted the fold-out maps. Other publishing houses have also reprinted selected volumes.
