= Hugh M. Cole =

American historian and army officer (1910–2005)

Hugh Marshall Cole (July 14, 1910 – June 5, 2005) was an American historian and army officer, best known as the author of The Lorraine Campaign and The Ardennes: Battle of the Bulge, two volumes of the official history of The U.S. Army in World War II.

Born in Pittsford, Michigan, Cole studied as a young man and achieved his doctorate in history in 1937 from the University of Minnesota. He taught at both Macalester College and the University of Chicago until 1942.

Cole became a U.S. Army officer in 1942. After serving as the chief of foreign area and language studies for the Army Specialized Training Program, he was assigned as a historical officer on the staff of General Patton's Third Army, with whom he participated in four campaigns in northern Europe.

Subsequently, Cole served as the European Theater deputy historian, and then as theater historian in December 1945. After leaving military service, he joined the Office of the Chief of Military History in Washington and supervised the preparation of the official histories of the U.S. Army in northwestern Europe during World War II. His own contributions to these works were The Lorraine Campaign (1950) and The Ardennes: Battle of the Bulge (1965).

Following his work with OCMH, Cole worked as an operations research specialist with the Johns Hopkins University's Operations Research Office and later with the Research Analysis Corporation. During 1976–77, Cole held the Harold K. Johnson Chair of Military History at the Army War College.

Cole died on June 5, 2005, of peripheral vascular disease in Alexandria, Virginia.

== Education ==
- B.A., Wheaton College, 1931.
- M.A. and Ph.D., University of Minnesota, 1933, 1937.
