= Horst Niemack =

German general (1909–1992)

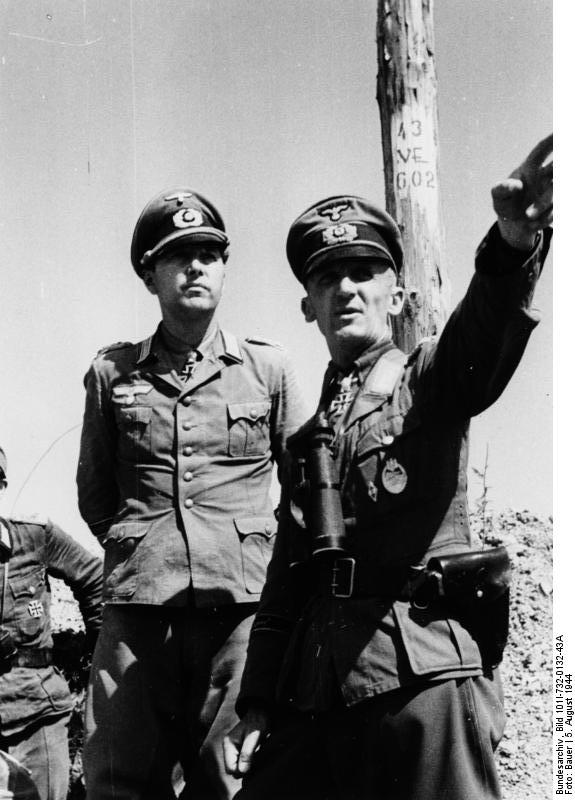
- Horst Niemack (left) with Hasso von Manteuffel
- Born: 10 March 1909
- Died: 7 April 1992 (aged 83)
- Military career
- Allegiance: Weimar Germany; Nazi Germany; West Germany
- Branch: German Army
- Service years: 1927–1945
- Rank: Generalmajor; Brigadegeneral of the Reserves
- Commands: Panzer-Lehr-Division
- Conflicts: World War II; Ruhr Pocket
- Awards: Knight's Cross of the Iron Cross with Oak Leaves and Swords; Great Cross of Merit

Horst Niemack (10 March 1909 – 7 April 1992) was a German general during World War II. He was a recipient of the Knight's Cross of the Iron Cross with Oak Leaves and Swords of Nazi Germany. Niemack later took command of the Panzer Lehr Division on 10 January 1945, succeeding General Fritz Bayerlein. From 1956 Niemack served as chairman of the Association of Knight's Cross Recipients (AKCR).

== Awards ==
- Iron Cross (1939) 2nd Class (17 May 1940) & 1st Class (12 June 1940)
- Knight's Cross of the Iron Cross with Oak Leaves and Swords
  - Knight's Cross on 13 July 1941 as Rittmeister and commander of Aufklärungs-Abteilung 5
  - Oak Leaves on 10 August 1941 as Rittmeister and commander of Aufklärungs-Abteilung 5
  - Swords on 4 June 1944 as Oberst and commander of Panzer-Füsilier-Regiment "Großdeutschland"
- Grand Cross of the Order of Merit of the Federal Republic of Germany (12 June 1969)

Military offices
Preceded by Generalleutnant Fritz Bayerlein	Commander of Panzer-Lehr-Division; 15 January 1945 – 3 April 1945	Succeeded by Oberst Paul Freiherr von Hauser
