= Benjamin Bederson =

American physicist (1921–2023)

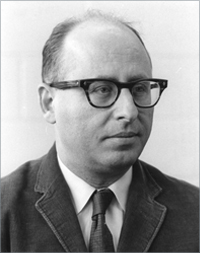
- Born: November 15, 1921; New York City, U.S.
- Died: January 6, 2023 (aged 101)
- Education: City College of New York; Columbia University; New York University
- Scientific career
- Workplaces: Massachusetts Institute of Technology; New York University; Physical Review

Benjamin Bederson (November 15, 1921 – January 6, 2023) was an American physicist. He worked on the Manhattan Project.

== Background ==
Bederson graduated from City College of New York, Columbia University, and New York University. He worked at Massachusetts Institute of Technology and was a dean at New York University. From 1992 to 1996, he was an Editor-in-Chief of Physical Review.

In 1959, Bederson was elected a Fellow of the American Physical Society.

Bederson died on January 6, 2023, at the age of 101.

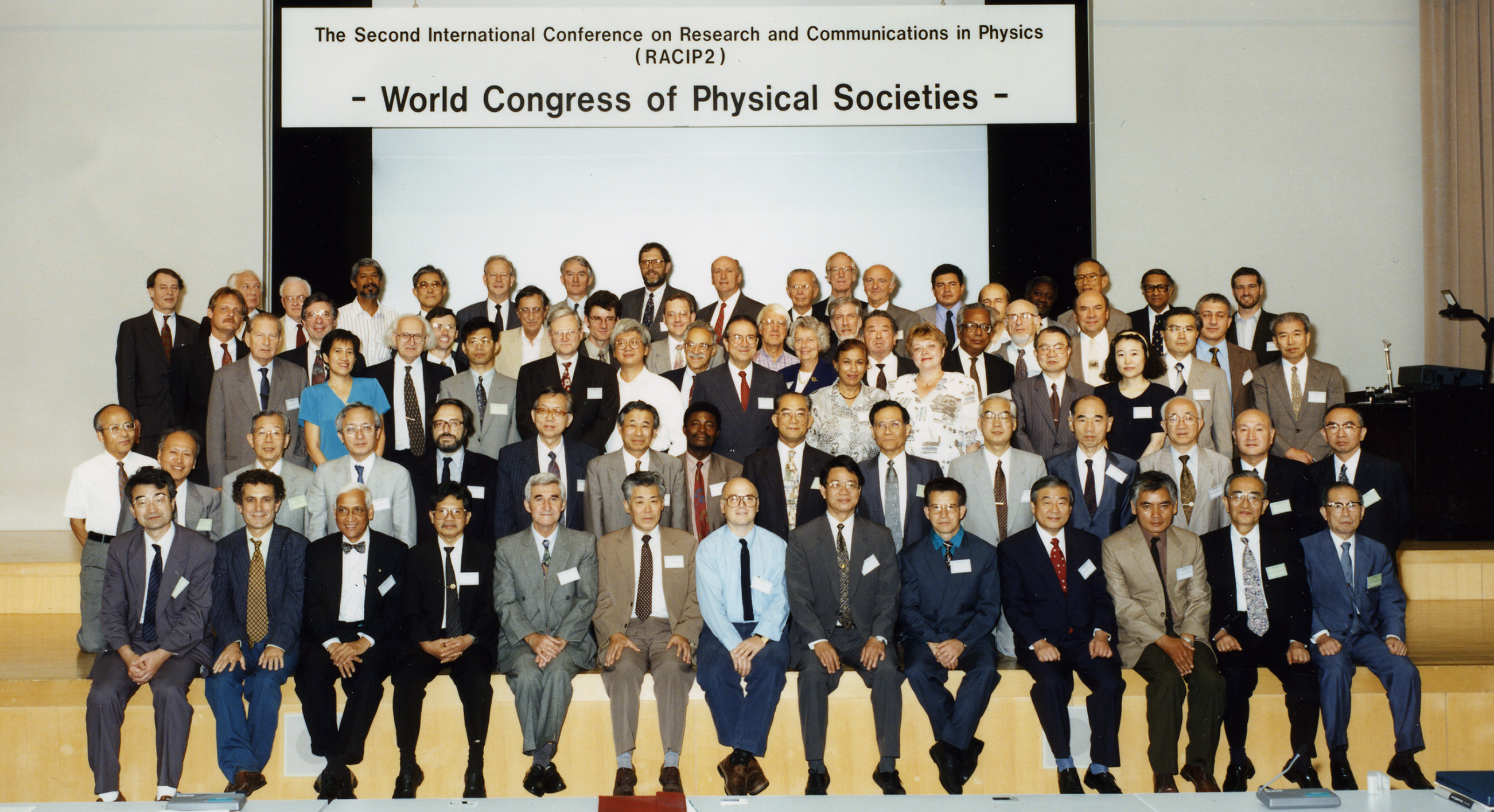
Bederson at the Second International Conference on Research and Communications in Physics
