= Panzerwaffe =

Nazi German armoured forces

Armored forces
- Panzerwaffe
- Active: 1936–1945
- Country: Germany
- Branch: Army

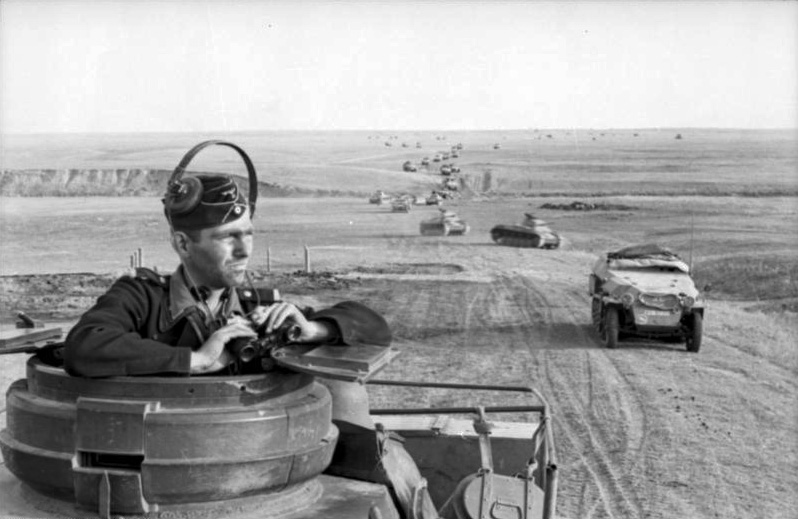
A column of tanks and other armoured vehicles of the Panzerwaffe, near Stalingrad, 1942.

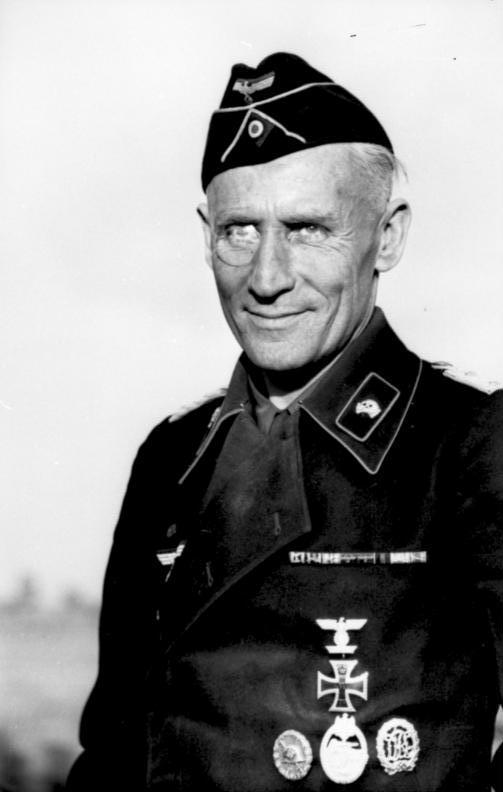
Oberst Richard Koll, commander of battle group, army group North in special uniform.

Panzerwaffe, later also Panzertruppe (German for "Armoured Force", "Armoured Arm" or "Tank Force". Waffe: [combat] "arm") refers to a command within the Heer of the German Wehrmacht, responsible for the affairs of panzer (tank) and motorized forces shortly before and during the Second World War.

== History ==
It was originally known as Schnelltruppen ("Fast Troops"); a motorized command established in the Reichswehr following the First World War, redesignated as Panzerwaffe in 1936 by Generalleutnant Heinz Guderian.

=== Panzertruppen ===
The men of the Panzerwaffe, are referred to as Panzertruppen (Armoured Troops), were distinguishable by their close fitting black uniforms, known as Panzer wraps. The corps colour of the German Panzertruppe was pink.

In addition to practical considerations, the uniform was inspired by the traditional uniform of the Brunswick Hussars. After 1943, the Panzerwaffe, like most other German branches of service, had relaxed the uniform rules and many Panzertruppen wore a variety of clothing, including camouflage and winter items.

Two training schools existed for panzer crews throughout the war, Panzertruppenschule I and II.

The mainstay of the Panzerwaffe was the Panzer division. These consisted of a panzer brigade (two tank regiments) and two motorized or mechanized infantry regiments. All forces of a Panzer division were mobile. Support elements included self-propelled artillery, self-propelled anti-tank, and armored reconnaissance cars. After the campaigns in Poland and France, the Panzer divisions were reduced in size, with only one Panzerregiment per Division. This move was taken to allow the creation of several new divisions with the available tanks.

=== Panzergrenadier ===
Motorized infantry were an early formation, and consisted of infantry transported by trucks. Early in the war, there were a number of light divisions, each a semi-motorized cavalry force created out of compromise with the Heer's cavalry command. These were judged inadequate following the Invasion of Poland and converted to fully motorized units.

During World War II they converted again to armoured reconnaissance divisions by the name of Panzergrenadier divisions consisting of motorized infantry (or armored infantry for some of the battalions, when sufficient (18 vehicles) half-tracked armored carriers were available), with self-propelled artillery (three battalions, each one with 14 self-propelled guns) and Jagdpanzer, and in some cases a significant panzer component.

== Organization ==
Responsible for the Panzer troops at the OKH was the Inspector of the Panzer troops (Inspekteur der Panzertruppen).

The Panzerdivision was the primary striking force of the German army during World War II. At the outbreak of the war, there were only five such divisions, but their number was expanded to ten by 1940, and by the war's conclusion, the total had grown to 27. (Note: This excluded the Panzerdivision controlled by the Luftwaffe, and the seven of the SS.) Initially, the army's Panzerdivisions were designed with two full tank regiments, comprising approximately 400 tanks, alongside a smaller infantry contingent and supporting units. However, most of these tanks were light models, primarily the Pzkw I and II, which were essentially armored vehicles equipped with machine guns or small-caliber cannons. Some divisions also included captured Czech tanks and a limited number of heavier vehicles.

The 1940 French campaign exposed weaknesses in the initial Panzerdivision structure, leading to a reorganization in 1940. This new structure consists of a single tank regiment, motorized infantry, and reinforced support units, with increased infantry components reflecting operational focus. The Divisional HQ supervised units, including communications, local defense, and reconnaissance. Infantry included motorized companies, heavy weapons, and engineers. Light armored car companies were attached. Infantry transported in various vehicles, especially on the Eastern Front.

A tank regiment (Panzer Regiment), 1,661 strong consisted of three battalions, each of two companies of Type III battle tanks and a company of short-gunned Type IVs for close support work. It also had a reconnaissance troop of Type IIs attached to Battalion HQ. Later the allocation was changed to two battalions of four companies, one of 96 Type IV and one of 96 Panthers, often with a ninth company of Tiger tanks or assault guns; this latter addition was most frequently found in Russia and from 1944 on was not common, the heavy tanks being organised in separate units. Various SP anti-tank and AA guns were also included together with maintenance and repair units.

The Panzer Grenadier Brigade was composed of two mechanized and well-equipped infantry regiments, each typically made up of two Abteilungen (battalions). However, certain SS Divisions featured regiments with three Abteilungen, and in some cases, three full regiments. After 1940-41, efforts were made to mechanize one of the four Abteilungen in each brigade by mounting it in half-tracked armored personnel carriers, designating it as the "gepanzerte" (armored) battalion. This designation extended to its parent regiment, which was then referred to as "armored." The armored Abteilung was heavily equipped with mobile weaponry, including 2 cm anti-aircraft/anti-tank guns and up to twelve 7.5 cm self-propelled close-support guns. Each regiment also had its own engineer, anti-aircraft, and self-propelled infantry gun companies. Light anti-tank weapons were integrated directly into the infantry battalions, though these were rarely reflected in standardized organizational charts.

The Panzerjägerabteilung (anti-tank battalion), numbering around 484 personnel, consisted of three companies. Initially, these units were equipped with light 4.7 cm and 5 cm anti-tank guns mounted on outdated tank chassis, often supplemented with captured enemy weapons. Over time, these were replaced with standardized 7.5 cm anti-tank guns, typically mounted on long-barreled assault guns or specialized Jagdpanzer vehicles such as the Type III/IV. Some divisions were also allocated self-propelled or towed 8.8 cm guns, which were highly effective against both tanks and aircraft. In the later phases of the war, adjustments to equipment allocations reflected the increasingly defensive nature of German operations.

The division's engineers (Pioniere) and signals units (Nachrichten) were integral components of its structure. The armored signals battalion was not a combat formation but played a critical role in maintaining communication across the division. In contrast, the armored engineer Abteilung was a combat-ready unit. It typically included two or three infantry companies, one of which was mounted in armored personnel carriers, while the others were motorized. The engineer battalion also maintained one or two bridging columns, often equipped with armored vehicles, as well as a light engineer column for various construction and demolition tasks.

The administrative services of the division were essential for maintaining operational readiness and included transport and supply companies, technical support units, commissariat staff, field police, and medical troops. These units ensured the effective delivery of supplies, repairs, and medical care, while also maintaining order within the division. Together, these components allowed the Panzer Grenadier Brigade to operate as a highly mobile and versatile force, capable of supporting both offensive and defensive operations in coordination with the division's armored and artillery elements.

== See also ==
- Tanks in the German Army
- List of German combat vehicles of World War II
- Panzer brigade, Panzer corps, Panzer division, List of German divisions in World War II
- Panzer uniform
- Blitzkrieg, Armoured warfare, Maneuver warfare
- Wehrmacht, Heer, Luftwaffe, Waffen-SS
- General der Panzertruppe
- Panzerlied

== Bibliography ==
- Guderian, Heinz (2001) [1952]. Panzer Leader (Da Capo Press Reissue ed.). New York: Da Capo Press. ISBN 0-306-81101-4.
- Davies, W.J.K. (1984). German army handbook, 1939-1945. New York: Arco. ISBN 0-668-04291-5.
- DiNardo, R. L. (2006). Germany's panzer arm in World War II. Mechanicsburg: Stackpole Books. ISBN 9780811733427.
- U.S. War Department, ed. (1995). Handbook on German military forces. Baton Rouge: Louisiana State University Press. ISBN 0807120111.
- Lucas, James (2002). German Army Handbook 1939 1945. Sutton. ISBN 0-7509-3191-4.
- McNab, Chris (2011). Hitler's Armies: The German War Machine- 1939-1945. Oxford: Osprey Publishing. ISBN 978-1-84908-647-9.
- Stone, David (2009). Hitler's army, 1939-1945 : the men, machines and organization. Minneapolis: Zenith Press. ISBN 9780760337509.
