= Operation Veritable =

1945 battle of WWII in Germany

- Part of the Western Allied invasion of Germany in the Western Front of the European theatre of World War II
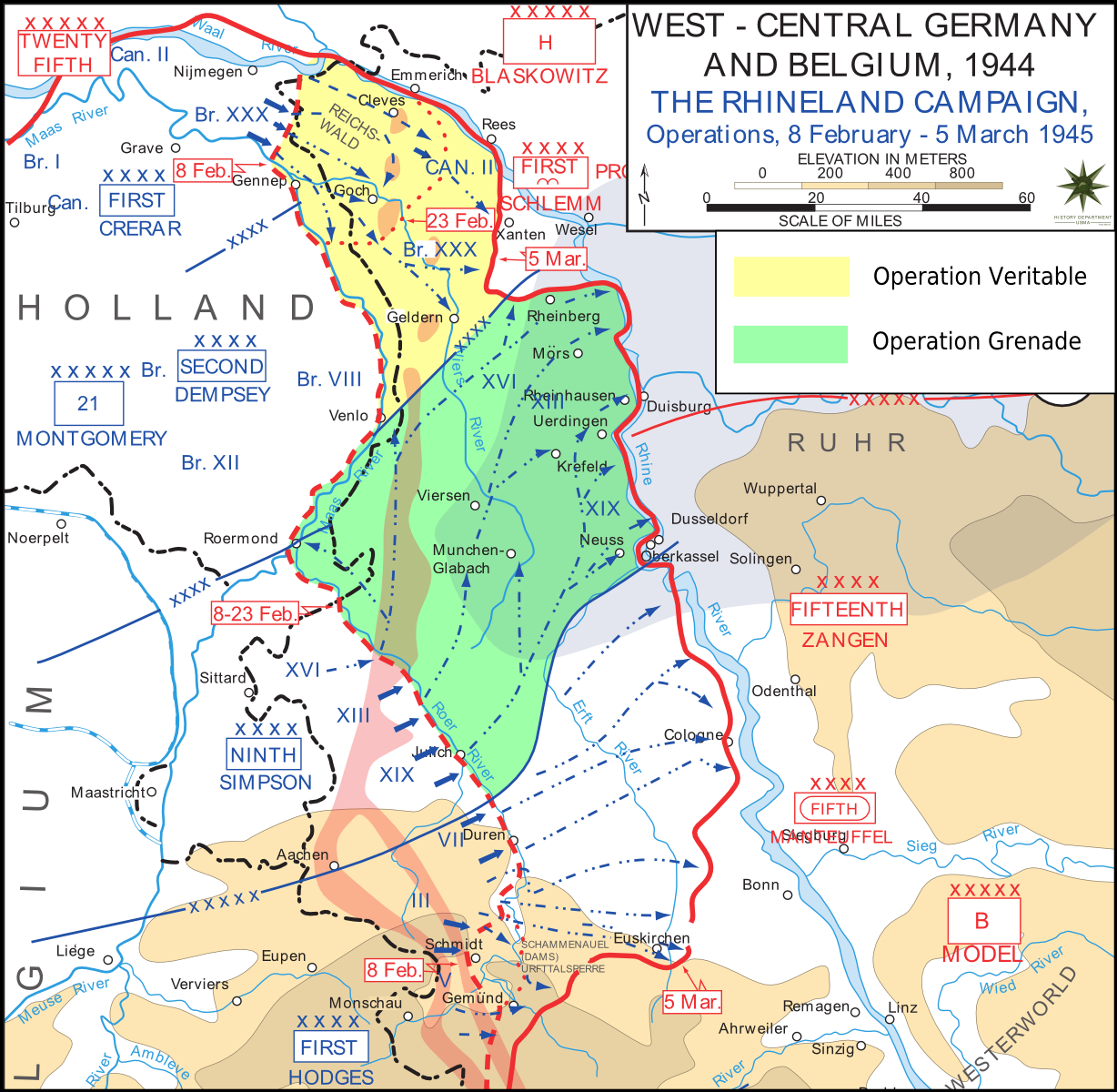
- Operations Veritable and Blockbuster (yellow) and Grenade (green)
Date	8 February – 11 March 1945 (1 month and 3 days)
Location	Reichswald Forest (Germany), and adjacent areas 51°42′N 6°06′E
Result	Allied victory

Belligerents
United Kingdom; Canada	Germany

Commanders and leaders
(United Kingdom) Bernard Montgomery (Canada) Harry Crerar (United Kingdom) Brian Horrocks	(Nazi Germany) Alfred Schlemm

Strength
200,000 men 1,400 guns 35,000 vehicles	90,000 men 1,054 guns 700 mortars

Casualties and losses
15,634 casualties (Note: First Canadian Army losses from "8 February ... [to] ... 10 March were ... 1,049 officers and 14,585 other ranks; the majority of these were British soldiers". Canadian losses amounted to 379 officers and 4,925 other ranks, the vast majority being lost during Operation Blockbuster. Total allied losses in Operations Veritable/Blockbuster and Grenade amounted to 22,934 men.)	~44,239 casualties (Note: Canadian First Army captured 22,239 prisoners during the operation, and the intelligence section estimated the number of German soldiers killed or made "long-term wounded" to have amounted to 22,000 men. In conjunction with Operation Grenade, the combined allied effort inflicted approximately 90,000 casualties on the German army.) (Canadian First Army Estimate)

Operation Veritable (also known as the Battle of the Reichswald) was the northern part of an Allied pincer movement that took place between 8 February and 11 March 1945 during the final stages of the Second World War. The operation was conducted by Field Marshal Bernard Montgomery's Anglo-Canadian 21st Army Group, primarily consisting of the First Canadian Army under Lieutenant-General Harry Crerar and the British XXX Corps under Lieutenant-General Brian Horrocks.

Veritable was the northern pincer movement and started with XXX Corps advancing through the Reichswald (German: Imperial Forest) while the 3rd Canadian Infantry Division, in amphibious vehicles, cleared German positions in the flooded Rhine plain. The Allied advance proceeded more slowly than expected and at greater cost as the American southern pincer, Operation Grenade, was delayed by the deliberate flooding of the Roer River by German forces under Alfred Schlemm, which allowed them to be concentrated against the Commonwealth advance.

On 22 February, once clear of the Reichswald, and with the towns of Kleve and Goch in their control, the offensive was renewed as Operation Blockbuster and linked up with the U.S. Ninth Army near Geldern on 4 March after the execution of Operation Grenade. Fighting continued as the Germans sought to retain a bridgehead on the west bank of the Rhine at Wesel and evacuate as many men and as much equipment as possible. On 10 March the German withdrawal ended and the last bridges were destroyed.

== Background ==
General Dwight D. Eisenhower, the Allied Commander, had decided that the best route into Germany would be across the relatively flat lands of northern Europe, taking the industrial heartland of the Ruhr. This first required that Allied forces should close up to the Rhine along its whole length. Montgomery's 21st Army Group had established a front along the River Maas in late 1944 and had also considered several offensive operations to enlarge and defend the Nijmegen, Gelderland bridgehead and its important bridges (captured during the operation to capture Arnhem). One such proposal, Valediction (a development of an earlier plan; Wyvern) - an assault south-eastwards from Nijmegen between the Rhine and Maas rivers, initially had been shelved by Montgomery. A conference was convened at Maastricht, in Netherlands' Limburg, on 7 December 1944 between Allied generals, to consider ways of maintaining pressure on the Germans throughout the winter. Consequently, Valediction was brought forward and allocated to the First Canadian Army. British XXX Corps was attached to the Canadians for the operation and the date was provisionally set as 1 January 1945. At this point, the name Veritable was attached to the operation in place of Valediction.

In the event, Veritable was delayed by the diversion of forces to stem the German attack through the Ardennes in December, (Battle of the Bulge or the Ardennes Offensive) and the advantages to the Allies of hard, frozen ground were lost.

The objective of the operation was to clear German forces from the area between the Rhine and Maas rivers, east of the Netherlands (Dutch) / German (Deutsch) frontier, in the Rhineland. It was part of Eisenhower's "broad front" strategy to occupy the entire west bank of the Rhine before crossing the river. The Allied expectation was that the northern end of the Siegfried Line was less well defended than elsewhere and an outflanking movement around the line was possible and would allow an early assault against the Ruhr industrial region.

Veritable, starting on 8 February was the northern arm of a pincer movement. The southern pincer arm, Operation Grenade, was to be made by U.S. Ninth Arm (Lieutenant General William Hood Simpson) increased to ten divisions, starting on 10 February. The US Ninth was still under 21st Army Group. The British Second Army was in the middle of the two arms.

Montgomery's directions were that "First Canadian Army, keeping its left on the Rhine, was to attack south-eastwards as far as the general line Xanten-Geldern"

The operation had complications. First, the heavily forested undulating terrain, squeezed between the Waal/Rhine and Maas/Meuse rivers (separated by six miles near Nijmegen widening to twenty at the objective line) , reduced Anglo-Canadian advantages in manpower and armour; the situation was exacerbated by soft ground which had thawed after the winter and also by the deliberate flooding of the adjacent Rhine flood plain.

German preparations was three defensive belts. Each of these formed of two or three lines of trenches 600 to 1,000+ yards apart, with minefields and barbed wire. Farmhouses and villages were turned into strongpoints and the towns had extensive defences laid out around them.

The start line of Veritable was between Boxmeer and Nijmegen. The Allies were able to use the rail network to bring up the units but the roads were in poor state needing 80 companies of engineers and pioneers to keep them usable following the thaw. Movement was at night with forces concealed during the hours of daylight; Allied air cover preventing German reconnaissance. Supply dumps were built up.

== Order of battle ==
=== Allied ===
At this stage, 21st Army Group consisted of the British Second Army (Lieutenant-General Miles C. Dempsey), First Canadian Army and the U.S. Ninth Army . In Veritable, the reinforced British XXX Corps (one of two such formations in the First Canadian Army), under Lieutenant-General Brian Horrocks, would advance through the Reichswald Forest and its adjacent flood plains to the Kleve – Goch road.

The First Canadian Army had had a severe time clearing the approaches to Antwerp during the previous autumn. It was, numerically, the smallest of the Allied armies in northern Europe and, despite its name, contained significant British units as part of its structure. For Veritable, it was further strengthened by XXX Corps. For Veritable it was expected the First Canadian Army would have four armoured and seven infantry divisions, five independent armoured brigades and four infantry formations "of brigade status"

The British and American strategic bombing force would probably be available for support but it was under the direction of the Combined Chiefs of Staff and could not be guaranteed. Fighter-bombers of No 84 Group of the Second Tactical Air Force would be assisting. In the lead up to the Operation, the 2TAF, US Ninth Air Force, RAF Bomber Command and US Eighth Air Force were striking targets such as HQs, bridges, rail and road routes as far as the Ijssel and the Ruhr to isolate the battle area. For the operation itself 83 and 84 Groups had 59 squadrons and could apply for further support from 2TAF. The air operations were coordinated with XXX Corps HQ through an attached Forward Control Post with a Mobile Radar Control Post to direct aircraft in bad weather.

At the start of the operation, Allied deployment was, from left to right across the Allied front:

- 3rd Canadian Infantry Division (Major-General Daniel Spry)
- 2nd Canadian Infantry Division (Major-General Bruce Matthews)
- 4th Canadian Armoured Division (Major-General Chris Vokes)
- 15th (Scottish) Infantry Division (Acting Major-General Colin Barber)
- 53rd (Welsh) Infantry Division (Major General Robert Ross)
- 51st (Highland) Infantry Division (Temporary Major-General Thomas Rennie)

Further divisions were committed as the operation progressed:

- 43rd (Wessex) Infantry Division (Acting Lieutenant-General Ivor Thomas) – Part of XXX Corps' reserve at the start of the operation.
- Guards Armoured Division (Temporary Major-General Allan Adair) – Part of XXX Corps' reserve at the start of the operation.
- 4th Armoured Brigade (United Kingdom) (Brigadier H. J. B. Cracroft) – Part of XXX Corps' reserve at the start of the operation.
- 11th Armoured Division (Temporary Major-General Philip Roberts) – transferred across the Maas from the British Second Army as the operation progressed.

Two Army Groups Royal Artillery were deployed for supporting fire. The 79th Armoured Division contributed their specialist vehicles (mine-clearing flail tanks, flamethrowing Churchill Crocodiles, amphibious Buffaloes, troop-carrying Kangaroos and combat engineer AVRE tanks).

=== German ===
Assessments by the OKH (the German Army High Command) were that an Allied advance through the Reichswald would be too difficult and the expected assault would be by the British Second Army from the Venlo area. Reserves were therefore placed to respond to this. Alfred Schlemm, the local German commander, strongly disagreed, believing, correctly, that the Reichswald was the more likely route. He acted against the assessments of his superiors and therefore ensured that the area was well fortified, strengthened the Siegfried Line defences and quietly moved some of his reserves to be nearer this line of attack which meant that fresh and hardened troops were readily available to him.

- 84th Infantry Division (Major-General Heinz Fiebig) - An inexperienced and under-equipped division re-formed after its destruction at Falaise in Normandy.
  - Luftwaffe 2nd Parachute Regiment - well-equipped, placed between the western tip of the Reichswald and the Maas.
  - 1062nd Grenadier Regiment and 1051st Grenadier Regiment, covered the edge of the forest facing the Allies
  - 1052nd Grenadier Regiment - defended the Rhine flood plain on the German right.
  - Two more, ineffective, units were held in the rear area: the Sicherungs Battalion Münster (a small unit of elderly men used to guard static installations) and the 276th Magen ("Stomach") Battalion, whose personnel had chronic digestive ailments that made them unsuited for active roles in the defence.
- 655th Heavy Anti-Tank Battalion - Around 36 self propelled assault guns, the only German armour immediately available in the Reichswald.
- 180th Infantry Division (Bernhard Klosterkemper) - Guarding the Maas river bank, facing the British 2nd Army.
- 6th Parachute Division (Hermann Plocher) - Elements fought in defensive positions at Kleve and Goch.
- 7th Parachute Division (Wolfgang Erdmann) - Elements in reserve at Geldern, as a result of Schlemm's expectation of an offensive through the Reichswald.
- 47th Panzer Corps (General Heinrich Freiherr von Lüttwitz) - Army Group H's armoured reserve, at Dülken, south-east of Venlo. After the fighting in the Ardennes, its two divisions, the 116th Panzer and the 15th Panzer Grenadier, were at just over 50 per cent strength with no more than 90 tanks between them.
- 15th Panzer Grenadier Division (Wolfgang Maucke) - A possible reserve formation, according to Allied assessments, that might be in place within six hours of the assault.
- 346th Division (Steinmueller)

== Terrain ==
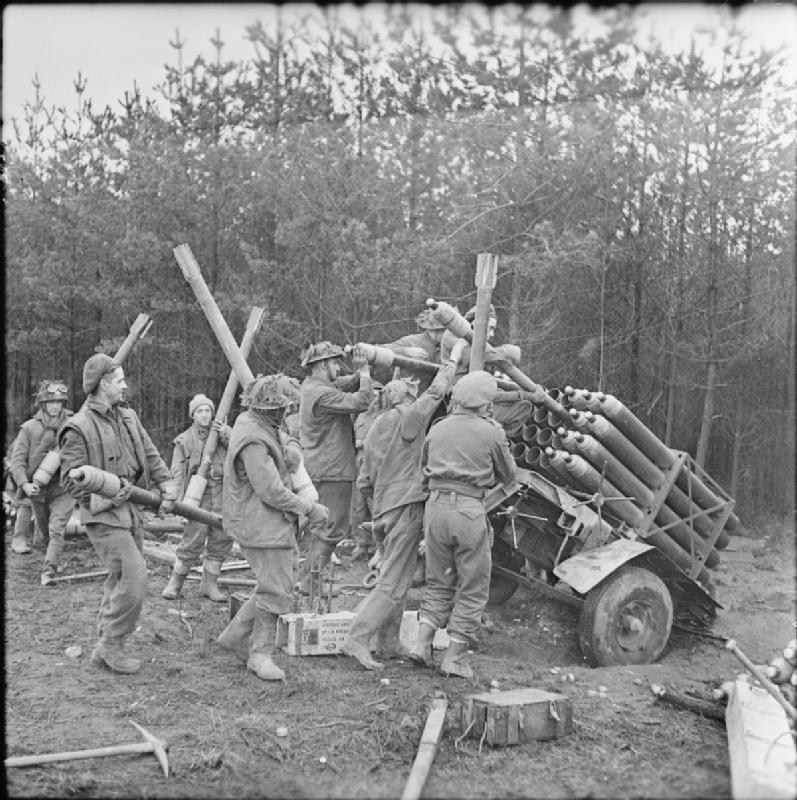
RP-3 rockets being loaded into Land Mattress launchers in preparation for the offensive in the Reichswald, Germany

The Allied advance was from Groesbeek (captured during Operation Market Garden) eastwards to Kleve and Goch, turning south eastwards along the Rhine to Xanten and the US advance. The whole battle area was between the Rhine and Maas rivers, initially through the Reichswald and then across rolling agricultural country.

The Reichswald is a forest close to the Dutch/German border. The Rhine flood plain, 2–3 miles (3.2–4.8 km) wide (and which, at the time of the operation, had been allowed to flood after a wet winter), is the northern boundary of the area and the Maas flood plain is the southern boundary. The Reichswald ridge is a glacial remnant which, when wet, easily turns to mud. At the time of the operation, the ground had thawed and was largely unsuitable for wheeled and tracked vehicles. These conditions caused breakdowns to a significant number of tanks.

Routes through the forest were a problem for the Allies, both during their advance through the forest and later for supply and reinforcements. The only main roads passed to the north (Nijmegen to Kleve) and south (Mook to Goch) of the forest - no east–west metalled route passed through it. There were three north–south routes: two radiating from Hekkens to Kranenburg (between two and five kilometres behind the German frontline) and to Kleve; and Kleve to Goch, along the eastern edge of the Reichswald. The lack of suitable roads was made worse by the soft ground conditions and the deliberate flooding of the flood plains, which necessitated the use of amphibious vehicles. The few good roads were rapidly damaged and broken up by the constant heavy traffic that they had to carry during the assaults.

The Germans had built three defence lines. The first was from Wyler to the Maas along the western edge of the Reichswald, manned by the 84th Division and the 1st Parachute Regiment; this was a "trip-wire" line intended only to delay an assault and alert the main forces. The second, beyond the forest, was Rees, Kleve, Goch and the third ran from Rees, through the Uedemer Hochwald to Geldern.

== Operation Veritable (Battle of the Reichswald) ==
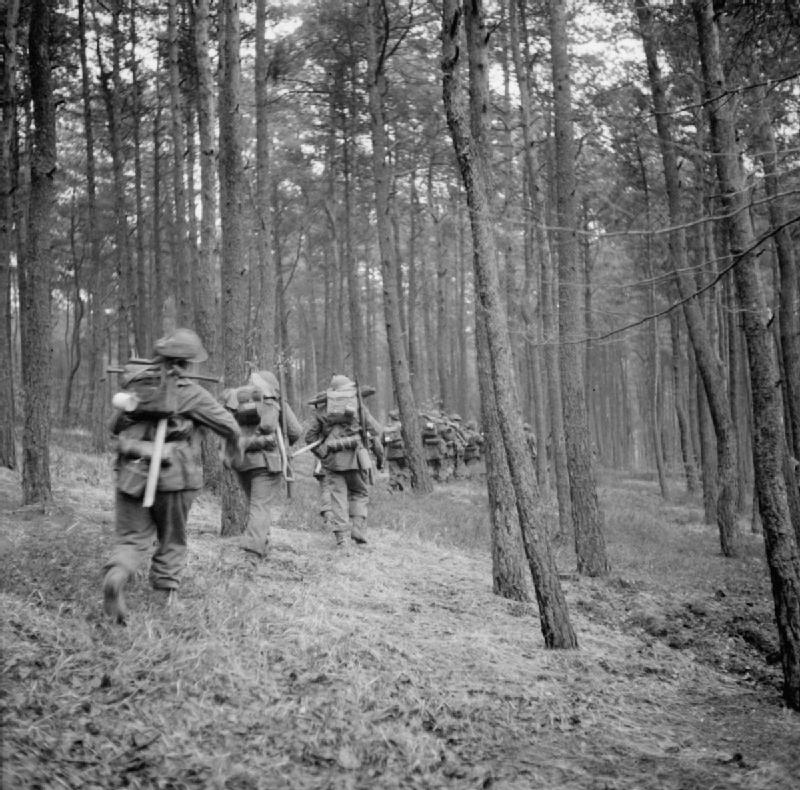
British infantrymen advance through the Reichswald during Operation Veritable, 8 February 1945.

Preparations for the operations were complicated by the poor condition of the few routes into the concentration area, its small size, the need to maintain surprise and, therefore, the need to conceal the movements of men and materiel. A new rail bridge was constructed that extended rail access to Nijmegen, a bridge was built across the Maas at Mook and roads were repaired and maintained. Elaborate and strict restrictions were placed on air and daytime land movements; troop concentrations and storage dumps were camouflaged.

Operation Veritable was planned in three separate phases. Crerrar envisaged:

"Phase 1 The clearing of the Reichswald and the securing of the line Gennep-Asperden-Cleve.
"Phase 2 The breaching of the enemy's second defensive system east and south-east of the Reichswald, the capture of the localities Weeze-Uedem-Kalkar-Emmerich and the securing of the communications between them.

"Phase 3 The 'break-through' of the Hochwald 'lay-back' defence lines and the advance to secure the general line Geldern-Xanten."

XXX Corps would lead the opening attack. As the battlefront widened Canadian II Corps would come into play

The operation started as an infantry frontal assault, with armoured support, against prepared positions, in terrain that favoured the defenders.

On 7 February at 10 pm more than 750 RAF heavy bombers deluged Kleve and Goch - towns sitting across the routes of advance - with high explosive. (Note: Kleve was bombed by a force of 295 Avro Lancaster heavy bombers and 10 de Havilland Mosquitos, Goch by 292 Handley Page Halifax heavy bombers, 156 Lancasters and 16 Mosquitoes. The attack on Goch was stopped after 155 aircraft had bombed as the smoke from the resulting fires on the ground was stopping the Master Bomber from controlling the remaining crews bombing accurately. The attack on Kleve had been offered to Horrocks by the RAF. He had accepted the offer, and was later to state it was "the most terrible decision I had ever taken in my life") about 1,400 tons of bombs on Cleve damaging the centre and south of town, nearly 500 on Goch.

In order to reduce the defenders' advantages, a large scale artillery bombardment was employed, the biggest British barrage since the Second Battle of El Alamein. The artillery began at 5 am targeting "batteries and mortars, command posts and communications". A line of smoke was laid across the enemy front, this feint was expected to draw German artillery crews into action with defensive fire. The Allied artillery ceased at 7:40 for ten minuted. During the lull, sound-ranging and spotting identified German gun positions and then the counter-battery fire began again. The barrage increased up to 10:30 as the first units moved into position. Then the barrage lifted and the advance started.

Men were literally deafened for hours by the noise of 1,034 guns. It was hoped that this would not only destroy the German defences throughout the Reichswald but also destroy the defenders' morale and their will to fight.

Operation Veritable began on 8 February 1945. At 10:30 five infantry divisions, 50,000 men with 500 tanks, attacked in line – respectively from the north, the 3rd and 2nd Canadian, the 15th (Scottish) in the center and the 53rd (Welsh) and 51st (Highland) on the right. The next day the Germans released water from the largest Roer dam, sending water surging down the valley, and irreparably jammed the sluices to ensure a steady flow for many days. The next day they added to the flooding by doing the same to dams further upstream on the Roer and the Urft. The river rose at two feet an hour and the valley downstream to the Maas stayed flooded for about two weeks.

XXX Corps advanced with heavy fighting along the narrow neck of land between the Maas and the Waal east of Nijmegen, but Operation Grenade had to be postponed for two weeks when the Germans released the waters from the Roer dams and river levels rose. The U.S. Ninth Army was unable to move and no military actions could proceed across the Roer until the water subsided. During the two weeks of flooding, Hitler forbade Field Marshal Gerd von Rundstedt to withdraw east behind the Rhine, arguing that it would only delay the inevitable fight. Von Rundstedt was ordered to fight where his forces stood. The imposed US standstill allowed German forces to be concentrated against the Anglo-Canadian assault.

At first, XXX Corps made rapid progress across most of its front but after the first day, German reinforcements appeared and violent clashes were reported with a regiment of the 6th Parachute Division and armored detachments. Horrocks ordered the 43rd (Wessex) Division to advance past Kleve into the German rear. This resulted in the greatest traffic jam in the history of modern warfare. With only one road available, units of the 43rd, 15th and Canadian divisions became inextricably mixed in a column 10 miles (16 km) long.

The 15th Division had orders to capture Kleve, but on the night of 9 February they were held up on the outskirts. The 47 Panzer Corps under General Heinrich Freiherr von Lüttwitz was directed to Kleve and the Reichswald. On 11 February the 15th had cleared the town. Having expanded the front line to 14 miles (23 km), the II Canadian Corps, with the 2nd and 3rd Divisions and the 4th Armoured Division, became responsible for the drive along the Rhine to Kalkar and Xanten. XXX Corps was to operate on the right and take Goch before swinging towards the Rhine and linking with the Americans – once Operation Grenade had been launched.

The 3rd Division used Buffalo amphibious vehicles to move through the flooded areas; the water rendered the German field defences and minefields ineffective and isolated their units on islands where they could be picked off, one by one. XXX Corps had rehearsed forest warfare tactics and were able to bring armour forward with them (despite a high rate of damage due to the natural conditions combined with the age of the tanks). The German defences had not anticipated such tactics, so these tanks, including Churchill Crocodile flame-throwers, had great shock value.

=== Operation Blockbuster ===
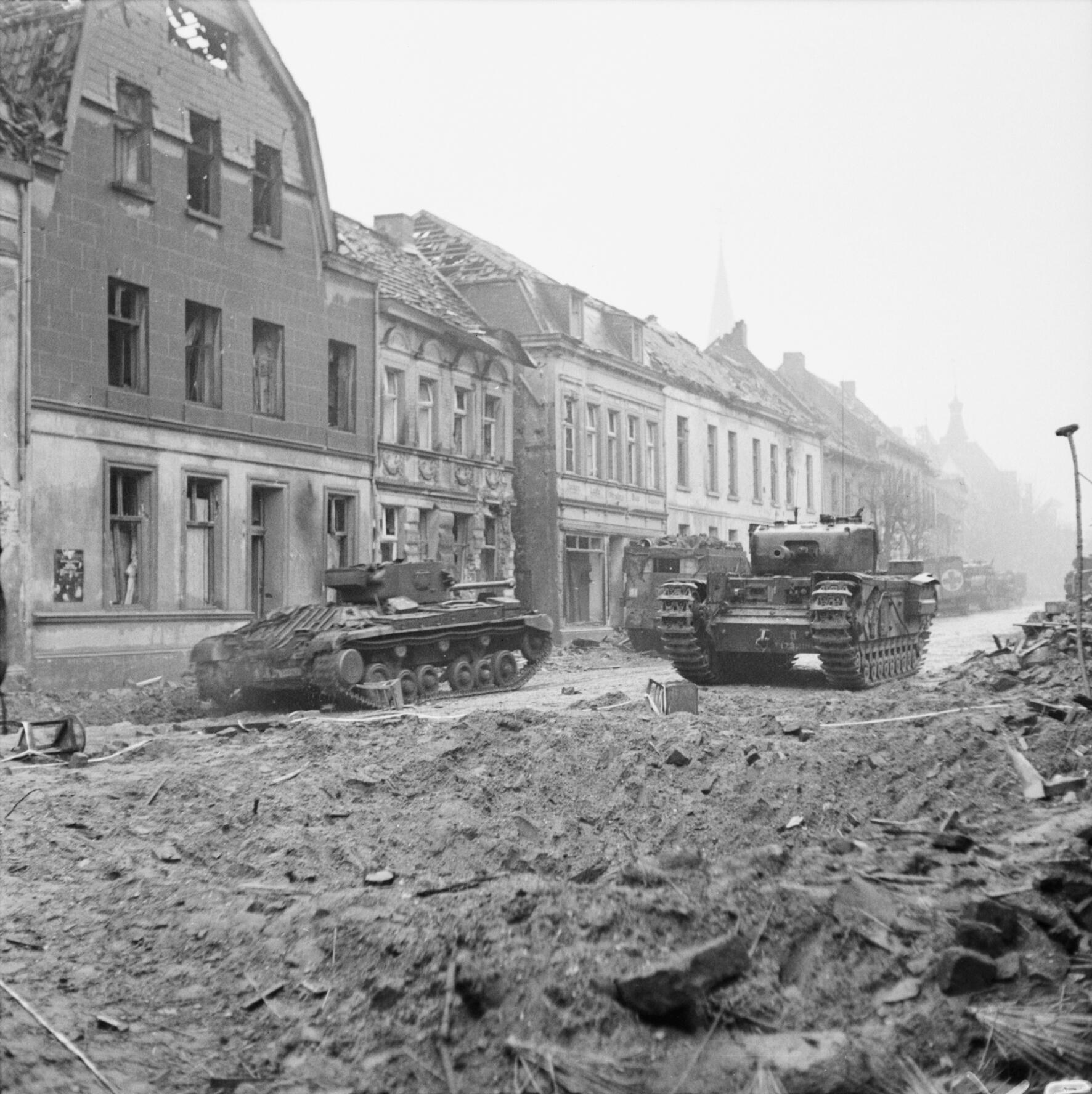
A Artillery Observation Post Valentine tank (left) and a Churchill tank (right) in Goch, 21 February 1945

Once the Reichswald had been taken, the Allied forces paused to regroup before continuing their advance towards the Hochwald (High Forest) ridge, plus Xanten to the east of it, and the US 9th Army. This stage was Operation Blockbuster. As planned, it would start on 22 February when the 15th (Scottish) Division would attack woods north-east of Weeze; two days later, the 53rd (Welsh) Division would advance southwards from Goch, take Weeze, and continue south-westward. Finally, the II Canadian Corps would launch, on 26 February, the operation intended to overcome the German defences based on the Hochwald and then exploit to Xanten.

By the time the waters from the Roer dams had subsided and the US 9th Army crossed the Roer on 23 February, other Allied forces were also close to the Rhine's west bank. Rundstedt's divisions which had remained on the west bank of the Rhine were cut to pieces in the Rhineland and 230,000 men were taken prisoner.

== Aftermath ==
After the battle, 34 Armoured Brigade conducted a review of its own part in the forest phase of the battle, in order to highlight the experiences of the armoured units and learn lessons.

After the war, Eisenhower commented this "was some of the fiercest fighting of the whole war" and "a bitter slugging match in which the enemy had to be forced back yard by yard". Montgomery wrote "the enemy parachute troops fought with a fanaticism un-excelled at any time in the war" and "the volume of fire from enemy weapons was the heaviest which had so far been met by British troops in the campaign."

== Notable participants ==
- British Formula 1 commentator Murray Walker was Captain with the Royal Scots Greys in the 4th Black Rats Armoured Brigade

== See also ==
- Western Front
