= Artillery brigade =

Specialised form of military brigade

An artillery brigade is a specialised form of military brigade dedicated to providing artillery support. Other brigades might have an artillery component, but an artillery brigade is a brigade dedicated to artillery and relying on other units for infantry support, especially when attacking.

Initially, a brigade was normally formed for either offence or defence, but in the 20th century, as warfare became generally more mobile and fixed fortifications became less useful, artillery brigades were formed for either purpose, the main exception being coastal defence. However, brigade-sized fortified districts persisted in the Soviet Union throughout the Cold War. During the Second World War, the use and formation of artillery brigades (normally having between 3,000 and 4,000 personnel, with between 24 and 70 guns) gained prominence, as they could be attached to divisions that needed them, then detached and re-attached elsewhere as the need arose.

A specialised type of artillery brigade is the anti-aircraft brigade. During the Second World War, many anti-aircraft brigades served both to defend from air attack and as offensive units against armoured vehicles – this was especially true with the effective German artillery.

Modern artillery brigades tend to be smaller and even more specialised than in the past, often specifically trained to handle just one or two types of artillery. In tactical terms, the use of helicopters has taken over much of the historic advantage of the artillery brigade.

== Royal Artillery ==
From 1859 to 1938, "brigade" ("brigade-division" 1885–1903) was also the term used for a battalion-sized unit of the British Army's Royal Artillery. This was because, unlike infantry battalions and cavalry regiments, which were organic, artillery units consisted of individually numbered batteries which were "brigaded" together. The commanding officer of such a brigade was a lieutenant colonel. In 1938, the Royal Artillery adopted the term "regiment" for this size of unit, and "brigade" became used in its normal sense, particularly for groups of anti-aircraft artillery regiments commanded by a brigadier.

Army Groups Royal Artillery were corps-level, brigade-sized formations.

== Artillery division ==
Specialised artillery divisions were established by the Red Army during the Second World War, in October 1942. Initially composed of eight regiments, they were supplemented by four-brigade artillery divisions by December 1942. They are mostly used by large armies with large territories to defend and with a large manpower base. Examples include 34th Artillery Division and 51st Guards Artillery Division. Artillery divisions are usually tasked with providing concentrated firepower support to higher combined arms formations such as Corps, Combatant Commands or Theaters. Artillery divisions were then established by the Indian Army since 1988 (three artillery divisions), the Iraqi Army for a short time between 1985 and 1998, and by the People's Army of Vietnam between 1971 and 2006. The concept of the artillery division is deeply rooted in Soviet military doctrine relies on treating artillery as a unique combat arm in its own right capable of achieving large results with its resources. It is a means to concentrate overwhelming firepower in a small geographical area to achieve a strategic breach in the enemy defences.

Dedicated anti-aircraft divisions existed in the Soviet Union and Germany.

== See also ==
- Fires Brigade
- Volksartilleriekorps
