= Oskar Munzel =

WW2 German army general (1899-1992)

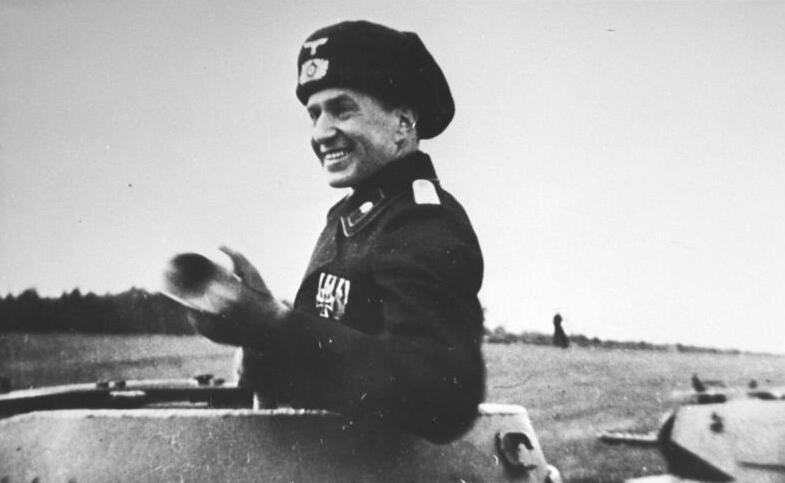
- Born: 13 March 1899; Grimmen, German Empire
- Died: 1 January 1992 (aged 92); Bad Godesberg, Bonn, Germany
- Military career
- Allegiance: German Empire; Weimar Republic; Nazi Germany; West Germany
- Branch: German Army
- Service years: 1917–45; 1956–62
- Rank: Generalmajor (Wehrmacht); Generalmajor (Bundeswehr)
- Commands: 14th Panzer Division; 2nd Panzer Division
- Conflicts: World War I; World War II; Operation Barbarossa; Battle of Białystok–Minsk; Battle of Smolensk (1941); Battle of Kiev (1941); Battle of Moscow; Second Battle of Kharkov; Courland Pocket; Operation Solstice
- Awards: Knight's Cross of the Iron Cross

Oskar Munzel (13 March 1899 – 1 January 1992) was a general in the Wehrmacht of Nazi Germany during World War II and in the Bundeswehr of West Germany who commanded several divisions. He was a recipient of the Knight's Cross of the Iron Cross. After the war, he served as a military advisor in Egypt, and then he joined the Bundeswehr in 1956 and retired in 1962. Munzel then acted as the Chief Advisor of Ming-teh-Gruppe (German Military Advisory Group) in Taiwan for the Republic of China Armed Forces before returning to Germany.

== Awards and decorations ==
- Knight's Cross of the Iron Cross on 16 October 1944 as Oberst and commander of 14. Panzer-Division
- Federal Cross of Merit

Military offices
Preceded by Generalleutnant Martin Unrein	Commander of 14. Panzer-Division; 5 September 1944 – 1 December 1944	Succeeded by Generalleutnant Martin Unrein
Preceded by Generalmajor Meinrad von Lauchert	Commander of 2. Panzer-Division; 20 March 1945 – 3 April 1945	Succeeded by Major i.G. Waldemar von Gazen
