= Heinrich von Prittwitz und Gaffron =

General officer of the Wehrmacht of Nazi Germany

- Born: 4 September 1889; Sitzmannsdorf, Germany
- Died: 10 April 1941 (aged 51) †; Tobruk, Libya
- Military career
- Allegiance: German Empire (to 1918); Weimar Republic (to 1933); Germany
- Branch: Army
- Service years: 1908–1941
- Rank: Generalleutnant (posthumous)
- Commands: 2nd Panzer Regiment; 2nd Panzer Brigade; 14th Panzer Division; 15th Panzer Division
- Conflicts: World War I World War II: Invasion of Poland; Battle of France; Siege of Tobruk

Heinrich von Prittwitz und Gaffron (4 September 1889 – 10 April 1941) was a general officer in the Heer (Army) branch of the Wehrmacht of Nazi Germany during World War II. He was commander of the 14th and 15th Panzer Divisions and was killed in action in the early stages of the Siege of Tobruk.

== Biography ==
Born in Sitzmannsdorf, Prittwitz joined the Imperial German Army in 1908 as a Fahnenjunker (officer cadet) and was commissioned into the 3rd Uhlan (Lancer) Regiment the following year and later on, served as a general staff officer for the Imperial German Army. He fought in World War I and after the end of hostilities, was retained in the postwar Reichswehr (Imperial Defence). By 1933, he was a major and despite his cavalry background, was developing an interest in a career in armoured warfare. Two years later, he was given command of the 2nd Panzer Regiment, 1st Panzer Division. He participated in the Anschluss of Austria and the occupation of Sudetenland. Now in the rank of oberst (colonel) in 1938, he was appointed as commander of the 2nd Panzer Brigade, which was part of the 2nd Panzer Division.

On the outbreak of World War II, Prittwitz led the brigade in the invasion of Poland during which it was heavily engaged. He was promoted to generalmajor at the conclusion of the fighting in Poland. (Note: In the Wehrmacht, the rank of generalmajor was equivalent to a brigadier general in the United States Army.) Along with the rest of the division, Prittwitz's brigade was then transferred to the west and attached to Generalleutnant Heinz Guderian's XIX Motorised Corps. (Note: A generalleutnant was equivalent to the rank of major general in the United States Army.) When the Germans invaded France and the Low Countries, the brigade performed well at Sedan and then advanced to the coast and reached Dunkirk. It was later used in the final stages of the campaign in France, rounding up French soldiers along the Maginot Line.

When the Panzerwaffe branch of the Heer (Army) expanded, Prittwitz was selected to lead the 14th Panzer Division on 1 October 1940. His new command was originally an infantry division which had only converted to armour two months previous. Based at Dresden, Prittwitz supervised the training and development of the division and in March 1941, he was given command of the 15th Panzer Division which was preparing for the campaign in North Africa.

The bulk of the 15th Panzer Division had yet to arrive in Libya but Prittwitz, accompanied by some light units of the division, arrived in the country in early April. He was immediately ordered by Generalleutnant Erwin Rommel, commander of the Afrika Korps, to take command of German forces operating near Tobruk, held by a garrison made up of Australian, British, Polish and Czechoslovak units. On 10 April, Prittwitz's group was ordered by Rommel to probe the south-east defences of Tobruk. As Prittwitz personally observed the front lines, his own vehicle came under fire from the Australian 2/28th Infantry Battalion, including so-called "bush artillery" – makeshift gun crews utilising captured Italian anti-tank guns. Prittwitz was killed in this exchange. Buried at the military cemetery at Derna, he was posthumously promoted to generalleutnant with effect from 1 April 1941.

== Notes ==
=== Citations ===
Military offices
Preceded by Generalleutnant Erick Hansen	Commander of 14th Panzer Division; 1 October 1940 – 22 March 1941	Succeeded by Generalmajor Friedrich Kühn
Preceded by Generalmajor Friedrich Kühn	Commander of 15th Panzer Division; 23 March 1941 – 10 April 1941	Succeeded by Oberst Maximilian von Herff
