= XXXXVII Panzer Corps =

XLVII Armee Corps (June–November 1940) XLVII Motorized Corps (November 1940 – June 1942) XLVII Panzer Corps (June 1942–1945)
- Active: 20 June – 1 July 1940; 25 November 1940 – 16 April 1945
- Country: Nazi Germany
- Branch: Army
- Type: Panzer
- Role: Armoured warfare
- Size: Corps
- Engagements: World War II; Western Front; Battle of France; Operation Overlord; Battle of the Bulge; Ruhr pocket; Eastern Front; Battle of Kursk

Commanders
- Notable commanders: Joachim Lemelsen; Heinrich Freiherr von Lüttwitz

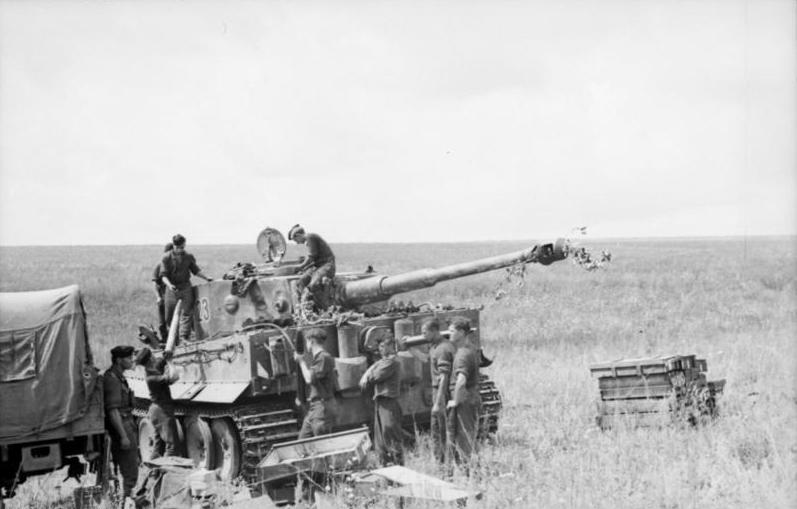
Tiger on the Eastern Front, mid-1943.

XLVII Panzer Corps (also: 47th Panzer Corps or XXXXVII. Panzerkorps or XXXXVII Panzer Corps) was a panzer corps of the German Army in World War II that was formerly designated as XLVII Corps. Various formations of the corps fought in the French campaign of 1940, in the invasion of Soviet Union from 1941 to 1944, and on the Western Front from June 1944 until April 1945.

== Initial Formation ==
The first formation of the XLVII Corps was on 20 June 1940, during the Campaign in France. This formation was shortly thereafter disbanded on 1 July 1940. The corps was formed again as a motorized corps on 25 November 1940 in Military Region XI. The new corps was initially stationed in Germany as part of Army Group C.

== Eastern Front ==
In May 1941, the corps was subordinated to Panzer Group 2 (later 2nd Panzer Army) and took part in the invasion of the Soviet Union, Operation Barbarossa, in 1941. On 21 June 1942, the corps was retitled XLVII Panzer Corps. The corps remained on the Russian front until March 1944, when it was stationed in France.

== Western Front ==
In 1944, the corps was transferred to the Western Front. The corps took part in the Mortain offensive, and attacked into the central Ardennes during the Battle of the Bulge. The corps was retitled Army Group Lüttwitz in January 1945. On 16 April, the corps surrendered with other German troops in the Ruhr Pocket to the U.S. Army.

== Orders of Battle ==
=== 10 December 1940 ===
- 14th Infantry Division
- 19th Panzer Division
- 20th Panzer Division
- 4th Panzer Division
- 20th Infantry Division (Motorized)

=== 22 June 1941 ===
- 29th Infantry Division (Motorized)
- 17th Panzer Division
- 18th Panzer Division
- 167th Infantry Division

=== 16 September 1944 ===
- 21st Panzer Division
- 111th Panzer Brigade
- 112th Panzer Brigade
- 113th Panzer Brigade

=== 15 December 1944 ===
- Corps Troops:
  - 182nd Flak Sturm Regiment
  - 1124th Heavy Artillery Battery
  - 1119th Heavy Mortar Battery
  - 600th Engineer Battalion
  - 15th (mot) Volks Werfer Brigade
    - 55th Nebelwerfer Regiment
    - 85th Nebelwerfer Regiment
  - 766th (mot) Volksartilleriekorps
- 2nd Panzer Division
- Panzer Lehr Division
- 26th Volksgrenadier Division
