= Franz Westhoven =

WW2 German Army general (1894-1983)

- Born: 7 December 1894
- Died: 9 October 1983 (aged 88)
- Military career
- Allegiance: German Empire; Weimar Republic; Nazi Germany
- Branch: Army
- Service years: 1914–1945
- Rank: Generalleutnant
- Commands: 3rd Panzer Division; 21st Panzer Division; 2nd Panzer Division
- Conflicts: World War I; World War II; Battle of France; Operation Barbarossa; Siege of Leningrad; Battle of Moscow; Battle of the Caucasus
- Awards: Knight's Cross of the Iron Cross

Franz Westhoven (7 December 1894 – 9 October 1983) was a German general in the Wehrmacht during World War II who commanded several panzer divisions. He was a recipient of the Knight's Cross of the Iron Cross of Nazi Germany.

Westhoven served in the Army personnel office at the start of World War II, where he had been from 1934 to 1940, and then took command of the 1st Rifle Regiment in October 1941 as an oberst (colonel) (promoted on 1 November 1939), and led this unit into Operation Barbarossa as part of 1st Panzer Division in Army Group North. In February 1942, he took command of the 3rd Rifle Brigade, which later became the 3rd Panzergrendier Brigade. He was given command of the 3rd Panzer Division on 1 October 1942, and was promoted to generalleutnant on 1 May 1943, but was wounded in action on 20 October 1943.

Returning to active service on 1 February 1944, he served as an advisor under his mentor Leo Geyr von Schweppenburg in Panzer Group West, had two brief deputy commands in France (21st Panzer Division from 8 March to 8 May 1944, and 2nd Panzer Division from 5 May until 26 May 1944), and ended the war in the roles of deputy inspector general of panzer troops (August 1944 – 1945) and commander of tank schools (1945).

== Awards ==
- Knight's Cross of the Iron Cross on 25 October 1943 as generalleutnant and commander of 3rd Panzer Division

Military offices
Preceded by Generalleutnant Hermann Breith	Commander of 3rd Panzer Division; 1 October 1942 – 25 October 1943	Succeeded by Generalleutnant Fritz Bayerlein
Preceded by Generalleutnant Heinrich Freiherr von Lüttwitz	Commander of 2nd Panzer Division; 5 May 1944 – 26 May 1944	Succeeded by Generalleutnant Heinrich Freiherr von Lüttwitz
