= Meinrad von Lauchert =

German general (1905–1987)

- Born: 29 August 1905
- Died: 4 December 1987 (aged 82)
- Military career
- Allegiance: Weimar Republic; Nazi Germany
- Branch: German Army
- Service years: 1924–1945
- Rank: Generalmajor
- Commands: 2nd Panzer Division
- Conflicts: World War II; Invasion of Poland; Battle of France; Battle of Białystok–Minsk; Battle of Kiev (1941); Battle of Moscow; Battle of Kursk; Dnieper–Carpathian Offensive; Cherkassy Pocket; Battle of the Bulge
- Awards: Knight's Cross of the Iron Cross with Oak Leaves

Meinrad von Lauchert (29 August 1905 – 4 December 1987) was a German general in the Wehrmacht of Nazi Germany during World War II. He was a recipient of the Knight's Cross of the Iron Cross with Oak Leaves.

On the eve of the Battle of the Bulge, Lauchert was appointed commander of the 2nd Panzer Division. His division punched through the American lines on 16 December 1944 and by the time the offensive had stalled Lauchert's men had achieved the deepest penetration into Allied-held territory of any of the German formations, reaching a point only nine kilometers from the Meuse by 23 December. Afterwards, Lauchert's division fought a continuous rearguard action against the US forces as they pushed the division back across the German frontier. During the fighting in February and March 1945, the division had ceased to exist as much more than a marker on the map. By the end of March, as the remnants of his division were backed up against the Rhine without a secure crossing point, Lauchert ordered a breakout eastwards in small groups. Lauchert swam the Rhine with a small number of his staff and, apparently fed up with the hopelessness of the situation, deserted and walked home to Bamberg. After the war, he was imprisoned for trial at Nuremberg for war crimes, but was found not guilty and released. Following the war, he served as a military advisor for the 1965 Hollywood movie, "Battle of the Bulge" and was acknowledged in the film's opening credits.

== Awards ==
- Iron Cross (1939) 2nd Class (22 September 1939) & 1st Class (23 October 1939)
- Honour Roll Clasp of the Army (8 August 1941)
- German Cross in Gold on 5 September 1943 as Major in Panzer-Regiment "von Lauchert"
- Knight's Cross of the Iron Cross with Oak Leaves
  - Knight's Cross on 8 September 1941 as Major and commander of the I./Panzer-Regiment 35
  - Oak Leaves on 12 February 1944 as Oberstleutnant and commander of Panzer-Regiment 15

Military offices
Preceded by Generalmajor Henning Schönfeld	Commander of 2. Panzer-Division; December 15, 1944 - March 20, 1945	Succeeded by Generalmajor Oskar Munzel
