= Panzer Division Clausewitz =

- Active: 1 April – 8 May 1945
- Country: Nazi Germany
- Branch: Army
- Type: Panzer
- Size: Division
- Engagements: World War II

Panzer-Division Clausewitz was a German panzer division during World War II, named for Carl von Clausewitz.

It was formed in central Germany area at the beginning of April 1945 under the command of Generalleutnant Martin Unrein, from the 233rd Panzergrenadier Division and also drawing Panzergrenadier troops from the 233rd Reserve Panzer Division and vehicles from the Panzer training school at Putlos. Other elements came from the reserve brigade of the Großdeutschland division, the remnants of the Holstein panzer division, the Panzerkorps Feldherrnhalle, conscripted outdoorsmen and tram workers from the Brandenburg area, and units drawn from Army Group Blumentritt.

The general quality of the men was high, as most of the infantry were front-line veterans who had been posted to reserve divisions after recovering from injuries, and the tank crews were mostly composed of instructors from the officer training schools. However, they were heavily deficient in equipment - overall, only around 20% of the assigned vehicles were available. The equipment they possessed was often outdated - several of their tanks were Panzer IIIs or Panzer IVs - and in a bad state of repair. Individual units were equipped with a variety of vehicles, making maintenance difficult, and ammunition was in short supply. There were no artillery pieces, very little signals equipment, and no supply troops.

It first saw action in the Northern part of the Eastern front, attempting a local counterattack against the Soviets in Pomerania. This was repulsed with heavy losses.

The unit was then sent to fight British armoured units from the 10th to the 12th, before being assigned to the XXXIX Corps. The XXXIX Corps was ordered to push south to cut the supply lines of the leading American divisions, which had now reached as far as the Elbe river, and attempt to link up with the 11th SS Panzer Army, which was fighting in the Harz mountains. Most of the strength of the division was expended in this push, and by the 20th it had split into small disorganized groups. On the 24th, the divisional commander was captured by American troops.

On 28 April, Clausewitz, having by this point been reformed as an Infantry division with railway workers and Hitlerjugend, along with the divisions Scharnhorst and Theodor Körner, was ordered to attack from the south-west toward the direction of Berlin, as part of Wenck's XX Corps. They covered a distance of about 24 km (15 mi), before being halted at the tip of Lake Schwielow, south-west of Potsdam and still 32 km (20 mi) from Berlin.
