= 14th Panzer Division =

German army division during World War II

- 14. Panzer-Division
- Unit insignia
- Active: 1940–1945
- Country: Germany
- Branch: German Army
- Type: Panzer
- Role: Armoured warfare
- Size: Division
- Garrison/HQ: Wehrkreis IV: Dresden
- Engagements: World War II; Invasion of Yugoslavia; Operation Barbarossa; Battle of Stalingrad; Courland Pocket

The 14th Panzer Division (German: 14. Panzer-Division) was an armoured division in the German Army during World War II. It was created in 1940 by the conversion of the 4th Infantry Division.

The division took part in the invasion of Yugoslavia and the Soviet Union, eventually being destroyed in the Battle of Stalingrad. Reformed, the 14th Panzer Division soon returned to the Eastern Front and eventually surrendered to Soviet forces in Courland in May 1945.

== World War II ==
The 14th Panzer Division was formed in August 1940 from units of the 4th Infantry Division and 4th Panzer Division. The 4th Infantry Division provided both divisional staff and the infantry components, while the 4th Panzer Division provided the tank element by transferring 36th Panzer Regiment to the new division.

In April 1941, the 14th Panzer Division took part in the Invasion of Yugoslavia, reaching Sarajevo on 15 April. Soon after, it returned to Germany in preparation for Operation Barbarossa. In June 1941, as part of Army Group South, the division took part in the invasion of the Soviet Union. It was involved almost continuously in the fighting throughout 1941, including the first winter on the Eastern Front. In early 1942, the division took part in the German summer offensives as Army Group South advanced through the Kharkov and Don regions. It was transferred to Friedrich Paulus' VI Army, which was encircled at Stalingrad soon after. By February 1943, the division had been destroyed in the fighting at the Battle of Stalingrad.

The division was reformed in Brittany, France. On 20 November 1943, 14th Panzer Division possessed 52 tanks (of which 37 were operational). By November 1943, it was combat ready, transferring back to Army Group South on the Eastern Front. It now had an additional battalion of StuG assault guns, the III/36 Panzer Regiment. The division was part of Army Group South up to June 1944. In August, after being refitted, it was transferred to Army Group North to the Courland area (now Latvia and Lithuania). The refit included delivery of Panther tanks.

In January 1945, the Red Army launched a number of major offensives across the Eastern Front. Much of Army Group North - including the 14th Panzer Division - was bypassed and became trapped in the Courland Pocket, and remained there until Germany's surrender in May 1945. The division was disbanded during the last weeks of the war, with its personnel being formed into two panzer brigades. Parts of the division were evacuated to Germany in the last week of the war and surrendered to the Western Allies while those units remaining surrendered to Soviet forces on 10 May 1945.

== Organization ==
Organization of the Division:

- Headquarters
- 36th Panzer Regiment (from the 4th Panzer Division)
- 103rd Panzergrenadier Regiment
- 108th Panzergrenadier Regiment
- 4th Panzer Artillery Regiment
- 64th Motorcycle Battalion
- 40th Panzer Reconnaissance Battalion
- 4th Tank Destroyer Battalion
- 13th Panzer Engineer Battalion
- 13th Panzer Signal Battalion
- 276th Army Anti-Aircraft Battalion (later added in 1942)
- 4th Panzer Divisional Supply Group

== Commanding officers ==
The commanders of the division:

- Generalleutnant Erik Hansen, 15 August 1940
- Generalleutnant Heinrich von Prittwitz und Gaffron, 1 October 1940
- General der Panzertruppe Friedrich Kühn, 22 March 1941
- Generalleutnant Ferdinand Heim, 1 July 1942
- Generalleutnant Hans Freiherr von Falkenstein, 1 November 1942
- Generalleutnant Johannes Bäßler, 16 November 1942
- Generalmajor Martin Lattmann, 26 November 1942
- Generalleutnant Friedrich Sieberg, 1 April 1943
- Generalleutnant Martin Unrein, 29 October 1943
- Generalmajor Oskar Munzel, 5 September 1944
- Generalleutnant Martin Unrein, 1 December 1944
- Oberst Friedrich-Wilhelm Jürgen, 10 February 1945
- Oberst Karl Gräßel, 15 March 1945

== See also ==
- Organisation of a SS Panzer Division
- Panzer division
