= Henning Schönfeld =

Nazi general and Knight's Cross recipient

- Born: 19 May 1894
- Died: 11 March 1958 (aged 63)
- Military career
- Allegiance: German Empire; Nazi Germany
- Branch: German Army
- Service years: 1912–1918; 1934–1944
- Rank: Generalmajor
- Commands: 2nd Panzer Division
- Conflicts: World War I; World War II; Invasion of Poland; Battle of France; Italian Campaign; Allied invasion of Italy; Battle of Monte Cassino; Battle of Anzio
- Awards: Knight's Cross of the Iron Cross

Henning Schönfeld (19 May 1894 – 11 March 1958) was a general in the Wehrmacht of Nazi Germany during World War II who commanded the 2nd Panzer Division. He was a recipient of the Knight's Cross of the Iron Cross.

== Awards and decorations ==
- Knight's Cross of the Iron Cross on 15 August 1940 as Oberstleutnant and commander of Aufklärungs-Abteilung 20

Military offices
Preceded by Oberst Eberhard von Nostitz	Commander of 2. Panzer-Division; 5 September 1944 – 14 December 1944	Succeeded by Generalmajor Meinrad von Lauchert
