= Martin Unrein =

WW2 German army general (1901-1972)

- Born: 1 January 1901
- Died: 22 January 1972 (aged 71)
- Military career
- Allegiance: German Empire; Weimar Republic; Nazi Germany
- Branch: German Army
- Service years: 1918–1945
- Rank: Generalleutnant
- Commands: 14th Panzer Division; III SS Panzer Corps; Panzer Division Clausewitz
- Conflicts: World War II
- Awards: Knight's Cross of the Iron Cross with Oak Leaves

Martin Unrein (1 January 1901 – 22 January 1972) was a German general during World War II who commanded several divisions.

== Career ==
Unrein enlisted the German army in the final stages of World War I and then joined the re-established Reichswehr, where he held various regimental posts through the 1930s. In September 1940, he was promoted to lieutenant-colonel and assigned to OKW. On 15 September 1941, he was appointed to command a motorcycle battalion in the 6th Panzer Division. The battalion was almost destroyed fighting outside Moscow, and Unrein was court-martialled, but was absolved of all blame.

On 10 September 1943, he was awarded the Knight's Cross of the Iron Cross. On 29 October of that year, he was appointed to command the 14th Panzer Division, which was shortly to be sent to the Eastern Front. On 26 June 1944, he was awarded the Knight's Cross of the Iron Cross with Oak Leaves. On 11 February, he was promoted to command the III SS Panzer Corps and remained with the Corps until 5 March. On 4 April he was appointed to command the newly formed Panzer Division Clausewitz.

== Awards and decorations ==
- Iron Cross (1914) 2nd Class (5 September 1918)
- Clasp to the Iron Cross (1939) 2nd Class (12 October 1939) & 1st Class (4 July 1940)
- Honour Roll Clasp of the Army (18 April 1943)
- German Cross in Gold on 28 February 1942 as Oberstleutnant in Kradschützen-Bataillon 6
- Knight's Cross of the Iron Cross with Oak Leaves
  - Knight's Cross on 10 September 1943 as Oberst and commander of Panzergrenadier-Regiment 4
  - 515th Oak Leaves on 26 June 1944 as Generalmajor and commander of 14. Panzer-Division

Military offices
Preceded by Generalleutnant Friedrich Sieberg	Commander of 14. Panzer-Division; 29 October 1943 – 5 September 1944	Succeeded by Generalmajor Oskar Munzel
Preceded by Generalmajor Oskar Munzel	Commander of 14. Panzer-Division; 1 December 1944 – 10 February 1945	Succeeded by Oberst Friedrich-Wilhelm Jürgen
Preceded by SS-Obergruppenführer Matthias Kleinheisterkamp	Commander of III (Germanic) SS Panzer Corps; 11 February 1945 – 5 March 1945	Succeeded by SS-Obergruppenführer Felix Steiner
Preceded by none	Commander of Panzer Division Clausewitz; 4 April 1945 – 8 May 1945	Succeeded by disbanded
