= Friedrich Kühn =

WW2 German Army general (1889-1944)

- Born: 7 August 1889; Eutin, Grand Duchy of Oldenburg, German Empire
- Died: 15 February 1944 (aged 54); Berlin
- Military career
- Allegiance: German Empire; Weimar Republic; Nazi Germany
- Branch: Imperial German Army; Reichswehr; German Army
- Service years: 1909–1928; 1930–1944
- Rank: General der Panzertruppe
- Nickname: Fritz
- Commands: 33rd Infantry Division/15th Panzer Division; 14th Panzer Division; Chief of Wehrmacht Motor Transport and Mechanization
- Conflicts: World War I; World War II; Battle of France; Invasion of Yugoslavia; Operation Barbarossa; Battle of Rostov (1941); Second Battle of Kharkov
- Awards: Knight's Cross of the Iron Cross; German Cross in Gold

General Friedrich Kühn (7 August 1889 – 15 February 1944) was a General der Panzertruppe in the Wehrmacht during World War II. He was a recipient of the Knight's Cross of the Iron Cross of Nazi Germany.

== Early life and career ==
Kühn was born in Eutin in 1889. He entered the Royal Prussian Army in 1909 and fought in World War I. At the end of the war, he was an Hauptmann and the commander of an infantry battalion. He remained in the post-war Reichswehr as a career officer. He served as the commander of Panzer Regiment 4 between 1935 and 1938.

== World War II ==
At the start of World War II, Kühn was in command of a tank training school near Berlin, where he had been since 10 November 1938. On 10 February 1940, he took command of the 3rd Panzer Brigade under 3rd Panzer Division, which he led into the Battle of France. On 1 July 1940, he was promoted to Generalmajor. Kühn and his soldiers played a key part in the second stage of the battle, Fall Rot, when they were able to penetrate the French Weygand line on the first day of the offensive to a depth of 15 kilometers, destroyed fourteen artillery batteries and paved the way for the exploitation of the breakthrough. For his decisive leadership on that day Kühn would later be awarded the Knight's Cross on 4 July 1940. In September 1940 he briefly held command of the 3rd Panzer Division in place of its commander Horst Stumpff, who returned to take command on 4 October 1940, and Kühn was appointed commander of the 33rd Infantry Division on 5 October 1940. The 33rd Infantry Division became the 15th Panzer Division on 11 November 1940, with Kühn keeping this command. On 22 March 1941 he traded command of 15th Panzer Division with Generalleutnant Heinrich von Prittwitz und Gaffron, and took command of 14th Panzer Division, which he led into the Invasion of Yugoslavia.

Kühn and the 14th Panzer Division participated in Operation Barbarossa as part of 1st Panzer Group under Army Group South, crossing into Russia near Ustyluh on 20 June 1941. The division captured Lutsk on 26 June 1941, reached Rivne by 1 July, and Bila Tserkva by 23 July 1941. The division turned south and drove through Uman on to Kirovohrad, which fell on 5 August 1941. Kühn then led the division through Kryvyi Rih to participate in the fight for Dnipropetrovsk, which lasted until 10 September 1941. The division then turned south and participated in the Battle of Rostov (1941), before spending the winter in defensive positions around the Mius River.

In 1942, Kühn and his division were ordered to assist in the counter-offensive against Russian forces in the Izyum area, which is where the unit was located until the middle of May 1942. On 22 April 1942, Kühn was awarded the German Cross in Gold. During the Second Battle of Kharkov, the division was ordered to relocate to Stalino, which is where it was located at the end of June 1942. On 30 June 1942, Kühn gave up the 14th Panzer Division, and on 1 July 1942, he was promoted to Generalleutnant. On 10 September 1942 he was appointed General of Army Mechanization at the OKH. On 23 February 1943, per orders directly from Adolf Hitler, he was put in charge of all motorization matters for all of the Wehrmacht. On 1 April 1943 he was promoted to General der Panzertruppe. On 15 February 1944, he was killed in a Berlin air raid at the Hotel Bristol.

== Awards and decorations ==
- Iron Cross (1914)
  - 2nd class
  - 1st class
- Knight's Cross of the House Order of Hohenzollern with swords
- Knight, 2nd class, House and Merit Order of Peter Frederick Louis
- Friedrich-August-Kreuz, 1st and 2nd class
- Knight's Cross, 2nd class with swords, Saxe-Ernestine House Order
- Hanseatic Cross of Hamburg
- Princely Schwarzburg Honor Cross, 4rd class with swords
- Wound Badge in black
- Honour Cross of the World War 1914/1918
- Clasp to the Iron Cross (1939)
  - 2nd class
  - 1st class
- Knight's Cross of the Iron Cross on 4 July 1940
- German Cross in gold on 22 April 1942

Military offices
Preceded by Generalleutnant Rudolf Sintzenich	Commander of 33rd Infantry Division; 5 October 1940 – 11 November 1940	Succeeded by renamed to 15th Panzer Division
Preceded by renamed from 33rd Infantry Division	Commander of 15th Panzer Division; 11 November 1940 – 22 March 1941	Succeeded by Generalleutnant Heinrich von Prittwitz und Gaffron
Preceded by Generalleutnant Heinrich von Prittwitz und Gaffron	Commander of 14th Panzer Division; 22 March 1941 – 30 June 1942	Succeeded by Generalleutnant Ferdinand Heim
