= Stomach division =

Military formation for ill combatants

In military terminology, a stomach division is a unit created for the purpose of containing combatants of disuse in the front lines. Its name originates from its original conception, in which men suffering from stomach illnesses were collected into units where their specialized diets could be handled more efficiently.

== Usage ==
During the later years of World War II, the German military was drastically short of manpower. German soldiers suffering from stomach illnesses or digestive complaints not deemed severe enough to prevent them from fighting were organized into "stomach" (German: magen) or "stomach ill" (German: magenkranken) units. The 70th Infantry Division (Germany) of World War II is the only known case of this practice being employed at the divisional level.

To keep them well enough to fight, they were fed on a specialised diet and were allowed their own latrines to avoid spreading their illnesses.

The German 282nd Replacement and Training Infantry Battalion (German: Infantrie Ersatz und Ausbildungs Battaillon 282 (M)) was committed to combat during the last stages of World War II. It was referred to as "Stomach Trouble Battalion 282" by the American 749th Tank Battalion.

Lieutenant General Brian Horrocks of XXX Corps used this term in an interview for the documentary series "The World at War", where he described a unit of sick troops being amongst the only German forces protecting the Rhine in Belgium.
