= Waldemar von Gazen =

Officer in the German Wehrmacht

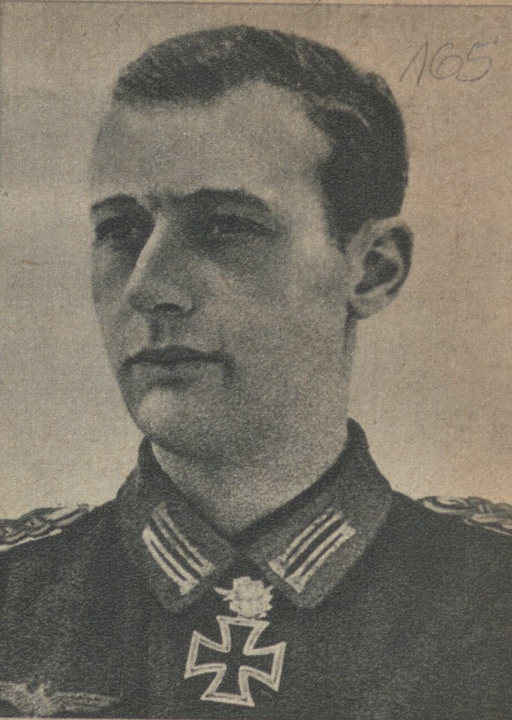
- Born: 6 December 1917; Hamburg, German Empire
- Died: 13 January 2014 (aged 96); Göttingen, Germany
- Military career
- Allegiance: Nazi Germany
- Branch: German Army
- Service years: 1936–1945
- Rank: Major im Generalstab
- Unit: 13th Panzer Division
- Commands: Pz.Gren.Rgt. 66
- Conflicts: World War II; Invasion of Poland; Battle of Stalingrad
- Awards: Knight's Cross of the Iron Cross with Oak Leaves and Swords
- Other work: Lawyer and Notary

Waldemar von Gazen genannt von Gaza (6 December 1917 – 13 January 2014) was an Officer in the German Wehrmacht and recipient of the Knight's Cross of the Iron Cross with Oak Leaves and Swords during World War II. The Knight's Cross (Ritterkreuz), and its variants were the highest awards in the military and paramilitary forces of Nazi Germany during World War II.

== Early life and career ==
Von Gazen was born on 6 December 1917 in Hamburg, a state of the German Empire. He was the son of the Oberst a.D. (Colonel retired; a.D.—außer Dienst) Oskar von Gazen. From 1918 to 1925, the family lived in Magdeburg, then to Sachsenwald. Following his graduation with the Abitur from the Gymnasium, a secondary school with a strong emphasis on academic learning, in Bergedorf, he completed his compulsory Reichsarbeitsdienst (Reich Labor Service).

He joined the military service in the Wehrmacht with Infanterie-Regiment 66 (66th Infantry Regiment) near Magdeburg as a Fahnenjunker (Cadet) in 1936. Infanterie-Regiment 66 was subordinated to the 13th Infantry Division which later reorganized into the 13th Panzer Division. He was promoted to Leutnant (2nd Lieutenant) on 1 September 1938.

== World War II ==
In the Invasion of Poland and the Battle of France, he served as a Zugführer (platoon leader). He was promoted to Oberleutnant (1st Lieutenant) on 1 September 1940. He was tasked with the leadership of the 2nd company of Schützen-Regiment 66 on the Eastern Front.

Von Gazen was promoted to Hauptmann (Captain) and received the Knight's Cross of the Iron Cross (Ritterkreuz des Eisernen Kreuzes) on 18 September 1942 for his achievements in summer of 1941 during the Battle of Kiev. Shortly afterwards he was made leader of the I. Bataillon (1st Battalion) of the regiment. In early 1943 he distinguished himself again in combat as the leader of a Kampfgruppe (combat formation) in the Kuban bridgehead. For these actions he received the Knight's Cross of the Iron Cross with Oak Leaves (Ritterkreuz des Eisernen Kreuzes mit Eichenlaub) on 18 January 1943. The presentation was made by Adolf Hitler at the Wolf's Lair, Hitler's headquarters in Rastenburg in June 1943. During this meeting, he and Oberst Karl Löwrick advocated for the introduction of the MP 43 assault rifle which Hitler initially had rejected.

Von Gazen was made leader of Schützen-Regiment 66 in April 1943 and was officially commander of the regiment on 28 August 1943. His regiment succeeded in holding the German lines in the vicinity of Melitopol against numerous attacks by the Red Army at the end of September 1943. Von Gazen was severely wounded in these battles. He was awarded the Knight's Cross of the Iron Cross with Oak Leaves and Swords (Ritterkreuz des Eisernen Kreuzes mit Eichenlaub und Schwertern) on 3 October 1943 for the achievements of his regiment.

After a period of convalescence he was transferred to the Generalstab des Heeres (General staff of the Army) on 1 July 1944. Here he received a general staff traineeship. He was appointed Ia (operations officer) of the 13. Panzer-Division stationed in Hungary in early September 1944. In February 1945, he was transferred again and was appointed Ia (operations officer) of the 2. Panzer-Division in February 1945. Von Gazen was taken prisoner of war in the Böhmerwald at the end of hostilities in Europe.

== Later life ==
Following his release from captivity, Von Gazen studied Jurisprudence and became a lawyer and notary in Uslar.

== Awards ==
- Iron Cross (1939)
  - 2nd Class (29 September 1939)
  - 1st Class (14 October 1939)
- Panzer Badge in Bronze (3rd Class)
- Wound Badge in Silver
- Tank Destruction Badge
- Kuban Shield
- German Cross in Gold on 15 November 1941 as Oberleutnant in the 2./Schützen-Regiment 66
- Knight's Cross of the Iron Cross with Oak Leaves and Swords
  - Knight's Cross on 18 September 1942 as Oberleutnant and chief of the 2./Panzergrenadier-Regiment 66
  - 182nd Oak Leaves on 18 January 1943 as Hauptmann and leader of a Kampfgruppe of the 13. Panzer-Division (I./Panzergrenadier-Regiment 66) (Note: According to Scherzer as leader of I./Panzergrenadier-Regiment 66.)
  - 38th Swords on 3 October 1943 as Major and leader Panzergrenadier-Regiment 66
- Mentioned in the Wehrmachtbericht on 3 October 1943
