= Heinrich Freiherr von Lüttwitz =

German general of the Panzer troops (1896 – 1969)

- Born: 6 December 1896; Krumpach, Province of Silesia, Kingdom of Prussia in the German Empire
- Died: 9 October 1969 (aged 72); Neuburg an der Donau, West Germany
- Spouse(s): Jutta (née von Engelmann) 1920-27; Jutta (née von Stein zu Kochburg) 1927-69
- Military career
- Allegiance: German Empire; Weimar Republic; Nazi Germany
- Branch: German Army
- Service years: 1914–1945
- Rank: General der Panzertruppe
- Commands: XLVII Panzer Corps; 2nd Panzer Division; 13th Panzer Division
- Conflicts: World War I; World War II; Invasion of Poland; Battle of Nancy; Siege of Bastogne; Ruhr pocket
- Awards: Knight's Cross of the Iron Cross with Oak Leaves

Heinrich Diepold Georg Freiherr von Lüttwitz (6 December 1896 – 9 October 1969) was a Prussian Junker, Olympic equestrian, and German officer who served in both World Wars, retiring as a General der Panzertruppe. Lüttwitz's team competed at the 1936 Summer games in Berlin but they came away without a medal. This failure was viewed as embarrassing by the Nazi regime and, as a consequence, he was left in professional obscurity for the next few years. He eventually went on to command two Panzer Divisions and the XLVII. Panzerkorps (47th Panzer Corps), where he earned fame for his demand of the surrender of the American 101st Airborne Division.

== Early and Interwar years ==
Lüttwitz excelled in school and, like many Prussian aristocrats, took up riding at an early age, becoming an accomplished equestrian. He was pursuing professional equestrianism when the First World War broke out. Despite the family tracing their military ancestry back to the 14th century and his father being a former Army officer, Lüttwitz was unable to get his father's permission to seek a military commission. In defiance, he enlisted as a private in the Army in August 1914, at the age of seventeen. His mother, from the prominent von Unruh(de) Junker military family, used her influence to have him brevetted to Leutnant in December.

After graduating from officer training, he was posted to the 48th (5th Brandenburg) Infantry Regiment, of the 5th Division. Thereafter began a tug of war between himself and his father, an influential veteran of the Franco-Prussian War. The elder Lüttwitz likely used his influence to have his son posted to the rear area of the unit, away from the front lines. The younger Lüttwitz then began a letter-writing campaign to his superiors, appealing for a transfer to the front. This was granted in 1917 when he was given command of an infantry platoon. He won the Iron Cross Second and First Class before being wounded and sent back to Germany to convalesce. After recovering in May 1918, his family again used their connections and influence, this time to have him posted to the 1st Ulan Schützen Regiment, a crack unit of dismounted cavalry, trained in exploiting breakthroughs in enemy lines created by Sturmtruppen. This tactic, successful early in 1918, was no longer viable by the time Lüttwitz arrived at the unit and so he spent most of the remainder of the war on maneuvers. After the Armistice, he returned with his regiment to Silesia. Unlike most units in the rapidly disbanding Army, his regiment was retained in the new Reichswehr as the 8th Cavalry Regiment of the 2nd Cavalry Division, enabling Lüttwitz to remain in active military service.

== World War II ==
He was kept from the frontlines of the Invasion of Poland until the outcome was already decided and then, three days later, was badly wounded by a Polish sniper.

In 1944 during the Battle of the Bulge, Lüttwitz's XLVII Panzer Corps had surrounded the US 101st Airborne Division at Bastogne. US forces were commanded by Brigadier General Anthony McAuliffe.

Before launching an assault by the 26th Volksgrenadier Division against the town, Lüttwitz sent an ultimatum to the American forces. His demand for US troops to surrender was as follows:

To the U.S.A. Commander of the encircled town of Bastogne.

The fortune of war is changing. This time the U.S.A. forces in and near Bastogne have been encircled by strong German armored units. More German armored units have crossed the river Ourthe near Ortheuville, have taken Marche and reached St. Hubert by passing through Hompre-Sibret-Tillet. Libramont is in German hands.

There is only one possibility to save the encircled U.S.A. troops from total annihilation: that is the honorable surrender of the encircled town. In order to think it over a term of two hours will be granted beginning with the presentation of this note.

If this proposal should be rejected one German Artillery Corps and six heavy A. A. Battalions are ready to annihilate the U.S.A. troops in and near Bastogne. The order for firing will be given immediately after this two hours term.

All the serious civilian losses caused by this artillery fire would not correspond with the well-known American humanity.

The German Commander.

He received the following reply from McAuliffe: "To the German Commander. NUTS!" The reply, "Nuts!", was explained to the German negotiators as the equivalent of "go to hell!"

== Awards ==
- Iron Cross (1914) 2nd Class (18 May 1915) & 1st Class (2 June 1918)
- Wound Badge (1918) in Black
- German Cross in Gold on 19 December 1941 as Oberstleutnant in the Schützen-Regiment 59
- Clasp to the Iron Cross (1939) 2nd Class (20 September 1939) & 1st Class (1 August 1941)
- Knight's Cross of the Iron Cross with Oak Leaves and Swords
  - Knight's Cross on 27 May 1942 as Oberst and commander of Schützen-Regiment 59
  - 571st Oak Leaves on 3 September 1944 as Generalleutnant and commander of the 2. Panzer-Division
  - Nominated for Swords in 1945 as General der Panzertruppe and commanding general of the XXXXVII. Panzerkorps (Note: Heinrich von Lüttwitz's nomination by the troop was received by the Heerespersonalamt (HPA—Army Personnel Office) on 28 April 1945. Major Joachim Domaschk decided on 30 April: "Heeresgruppe B, postpone!" General Von Lüttwiz together with the remaining forces of the Heeresgruppe B was either taken prisoner of war or missing in action in the Ruhr Pocket on 15 April. The nomination was thus not further processed in accordance with AHA 44 Ziff. 572. The nomination list for the higher grades of the Knight's Cross of the Iron Cross also contains a note from 28 April 1945: "postponed". A bestowal thus didn't occur.)

== Notes ==
Military offices
Preceded by Generalleutnant Vollrath Lübbe	Commander of 2. Panzer-Division; 1 February 1944 – 4 May 1944	Succeeded by Generalleutnant Franz Westhoven
Preceded by Generalleutnant Franz Westhoven	Commander of 2. Panzer-Division; 27 May 1944 – 31 August 1944	Succeeded by Oberst Eberhard von Nostitz
Preceded by General der Panzertruppe Hans Freiherr von Funck	Commander of XLVII. Panzerkorps; 4 September 1944 – April 1945	Succeeded by None
