= Volksartilleriekorps =

Artillery formation of the WWII German Army

A Volksartilleriekorps (People's Artillery Corps) was a brigade-sized massed artillery formation employed by the German Army in World War II from late 1944 until the end of the war. A Volksartilleriekorps (VAK) was typically composed of five or six battalions of differing kinds of howitzers and guns, including antitank and anti-aircraft guns. Where deployed, VAKs were normally allocated on the basis of one to two per field army. As an organizational development of massed artillery, VAKs were relative latecomers in World War II and neither numerous enough nor strong enough to counter the massive artillery support of the Red Army or the powerful and expertly controlled corps and army artillery units of the Western Allies.

== History ==
The first VAKs were organized in September and October 1944, and employed on both the Western and Eastern Fronts. Eventually, 13 VAKs were organized, being numbered 166, 388, 401 - 410, and 766. In addition to the VAKs, two regiments of Volksartillerie, the 1133rd and 1134th, were organized and employed in support of the Nineteenth Army in Alsace and Baden. VAKs were formed by re-designating existing artillery units and so did not represent an increase in the number of non-divisional artillery battalions supporting the German forces.

The first mass employment of VAKs was during the Battle of the Bulge in which several VAKs were used to initially impressive effect during German breakthrough operations. The VAKs, many of whose units used horse-drawn transport, however proved unable to effectively keep pace with the motorized and armored units in the vanguard of the German offensive.

== Organization ==
VAKs were organized as either partially motorized or fully motorized units. Partially motorized VAKs had motor transport for their artillery pieces with 2/3 of the remaining equipment being horse-drawn. The number of authorized trucks ranged from 124 to 406, depending on the type of VAK. The parlous state of German army motor transport in the final months of the war, however, meant that even fully motorized units often did not have enough prime movers to swiftly redeploy their artillery pieces as the flow of battle demanded. Besides the degree of motorization, VAKs were also distinguished as "Type I" (six battalions of artillery) or "Type II" (five battalions of artillery).

Type I VAKs were authorized:

- One battalion of 18 7.5 cm antitank guns used in a field gun role
- One battalion of 18 8.8 cm antitank guns used in a field gun role
- One battalion of 18 10.5 cm howitzers
- One battalion of 12 122 mm howitzers (probably captured from Soviet Union troops)
- One battalion of 12 15 cm howitzers
- One battalion of six 21 cm guns and three 17 cm guns

Type II VAKs were authorized:

- One battalion of 18 7.5 cm antitank guns used in a field gun role
- One battalion of 12 10 cm guns
- One battalion of 18 10.5 cm howitzers
- One battalion of 12 122 mm howitzers
- One battalion of 12 152 mm howitzers (probably captured from Soviet Union troops)

Corps headquarters for Type I fully motorized VAKs included an observation battery.

== Article Sources ==
- Keilig, Wolf, Das Deutsche Heer 1939-1945, Bad Nauheim: Podzun Verlag, 1960.
- Nafziger, George F., Panzers and Artillery in World War II, London: Greenhill Books, 1999. ISBN 1-85367-359-5.
- Sawicki, Tadeusz, Niemieckie wojska lądowe na froncie wschodnim czerwiec 1944 - maj 1945 (struktura), Warszawa: Państwowe Wydawnictwo Naukowe, 1987. ISBN 83-01-06556-7.
- Tessin, Georg, Verbände und Truppen der deutschen Wehrmacht und Waffen-SS 1939 - 1945, Osnabrück: Biblio Verlag, 1979. ISBN 3-7648-1170-6.
