= 2nd Panzer Division (Wehrmacht) =

German army division during World War II

- 2. Panzer-Division
- Unit insignia
- Active: 15 October 1935 – 8 May 1945
- Country: Nazi Germany
- Branch: German Army
- Type: Panzer
- Role: Armoured warfare
- Size: Division
- Garrison/HQ: Wehrkreis XIII: Würzburg (1935–38) Wehrkreis XVIII: Vienna (1938–45)
- Engagements: World War II; Invasion of Poland; Battle of France; Battle of Greece; Operation Barbarossa; Battle of Kursk; Invasion of Normandy; Battle of the Bulge; German invasion of Albania

Commanders
- Notable commanders: Heinz Guderian

Insignia
- 1939–1940

- 1940–1945 (variant)

- 1940–1944

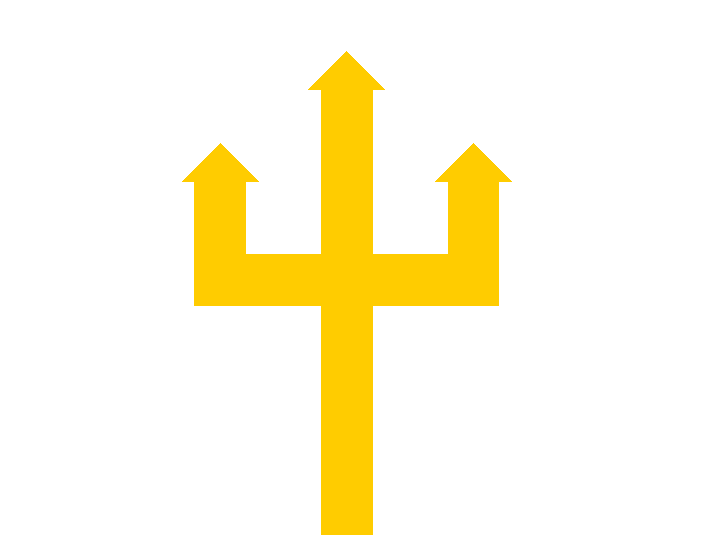
- 1944–1945

The 2nd Panzer Division (English: 2nd Tank Division) was an armoured division in the German Army, the Heer, during World War II.

Created as one of the original three German tank divisions in 1935, it was stationed in Austria after the Anschluss and then participated in the campaigns in Poland (1939) and France (1940) before it returned to Poland for occupation duties (1940–1941). It took part in the Balkans campaign (1941) and then transferred to the Eastern Front in September 1941.

The division fought with Army Group Centre in the battles of Moscow (1941) and Kursk (1943). After heavy losses on the Eastern Front it was sent to France for rehabilitation (1944). It fought in Normandy and was almost completely destroyed in the Falaise Pocket (1944). It was rebuilt once more and fought in the Battle of the Bulge (1944) and in the defence of the Rhine (1945), surrendering to US forces at war's end.

== History ==
=== Formation ===
The 2nd Panzer Division was formed on 15 October 1935 and was headquartered in Würzburg, Bavaria. It was one of three tank divisions created at the time, the other two having been the 1st and 3rd Panzer Division. Germany had renounced the Treaty of Versailles earlier in the year which had forbidden the country, among other things, from having tank forces, a treaty Germany had violated almost from the start by secretly developing tanks and operating a covert tank school in the Soviet Union.

Under the command of Heinz Guderian the division participated in the Anschluss of Austria in 1938, covering 680 kilometres (420 mi) in 48 hours but in the process losing 30 percent of its tanks to accidents and mechanical failures. It formed part of the garrison in Vienna, Austria's capital with most of its personnel now recruited from former Austria.

=== Invasion of Poland ===
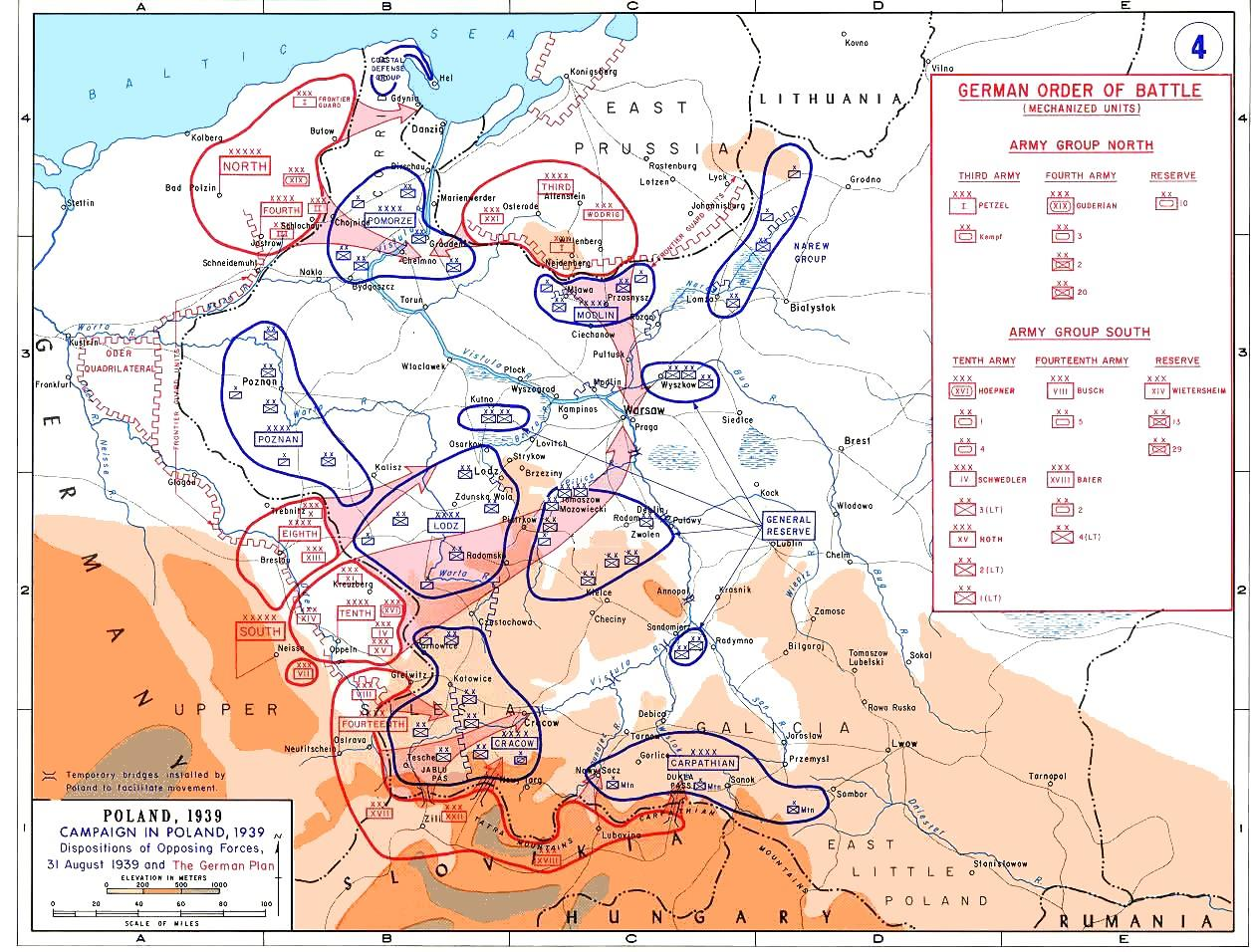
The deployment and planned advances for the invasion of Poland with 2nd Panzer Division moving towards the northeast from Slovakia, to take Kraków and continue to Warsaw through the Vistula valley.

In early September 1939, the 2nd Panzer Division took part in the invasion of Poland, crossing the Polish-Slowak border and advancing towards Kraków. The division suffered heavy losses while fighting in central Poland.

=== Battle of France ===
German armoured advance (including 2nd Panzer Division) through the Ardennes between 10 and 16 May 1940, as part of the Battle of France

In May 1940, the unit took part in the Battle of France as a part of the XIX Army Corps under the command of Guderian. The division was involved in fighting in Belgium and the Mosel River valley. On 20 May it arrived at the town of Abbeville on the River Somme, overrunning the ill-equipped 2nd Line Territorials of the British 35th Brigade and occupying the town that night.

The division advanced on Boulogne and was involved in a battle with the under-equipped French 48th Regiment on 22 May. Having overcome the defenders, the 2nd Panzers made a direct attack on the port itself which was in complete chaos. Later, the division formed the armoured element which flanked the British Expeditionary Force and forced their evacuation from Dunkirk. The 2nd Panzer Division then advanced along the River Aisne into the interior of France. At the end of the campaign in the last months of 1940, the division lost its 4th Panzer Regiment which was used as the basis for the soon-to-be-formed 13th Panzer Division.

=== Invasion of Greece ===
The division was reassigned to the XVIII Mountain Corps of the 12th Army on 6 April 1941 to play a role in Operation Marita, the invasion of Greece. The German army pushed through the south of Yugoslavia, reaching the Greek border, where they made contact with the 19th Greek Mechanized Division in the area of Lake Dojran. On 9 April the division took the city of Salonika and forced the surrender of the Greek Eastern Macedonia Army Section.

The division, together with the 5th Mountain Division, the 6th Mountain Division and the 72nd Infantry Division, formed an attack group with the mission of advancing into the south of Greece. After the 6th Division had taken Verroia and formed a river crossing beachhead on the other side of the River Haliacmon, the 2nd Panzer Division crossed, taking Katerini on 14 April. After the Battle of Thermopylae, the 2nd Panzer Division entered Athens together with the 6th Mountain Division.

At the end of the campaign the 2nd Panzer Division returned to Vienna for refitting, with parts of the division transported by sea and suffering heavy losses when the transport ships Marburg and Kybfels hits mines (laid by HMS Abdiel) and sank.

=== Invasion of the Soviet Union ===
In October 1941, the 2nd Panzer Division was sent to the Eastern Front, reinforcing Army Group Centre in their push towards Moscow, Operation Typhoon. It was attached to the XL Panzer Corps (later to the V Army Corps of the 4th Panzer Army during the Battle of Moscow). On November 16, the units of the division attacked the Soviet positions where "Panfilov's Twenty-Eight Guardsmen" were supposed to be. The division retreated following a counterattack of the Red Army in the winter of 1941, taking part in various battles as a component in the 9th German Army during the first months of 1942. In 1943 the 2nd Panzer Division took part in Operation Citadel, as part of the XLVII Panzer Corps of the 9th German Army of Army Group Centre. Following the operation's failure, the Red Army launched Operation Kutuzov in Army Group's Center's sector. The division retreated, suffering heavy losses, having also lost two of its three tank battalions earlier in 1942 when they were sent to the southern sector of the front to assist with the German push towards the Volga and Caucasus.

=== Battle of Normandy ===
In late 1943 the 2nd Panzer Division was sent to France for refitting after the heavy losses it suffered on the Eastern Front. The division was equipped with Panther tanks. Following the invasion of Normandy, the division was moved to Normandy in June 1944; it engaged British troops of the 50th Infantry Division and the 7th Armoured Division. From June 6 until mid July the division stood in the Caumont area engaged in daily skirmishes with British units. During Operation Epsom a group of six Panther tanks of the Pz.Rg.3 was used for a counterattack to take Cheux but that attack failed and five of their tanks were lost. Although the 2nd Panzer Division was very experienced the German doctrine overall was flawed and could not be exploited in Normandy. All German Panzer divisions in Normandy suffered severe defeats when counterattacking. The division was relieved at Caumont by the 326th Infantry Division and sent to the Verrières ridge southwest of Caen. During the Canadian Operation Spring a Kampfgruppe from the division (Kampfgruppe Sterz) was sent to reinforce the 272nd Infantry Division at St. Andre sur Orne and St. Martin. The Kampfgruppe took St. Martin, destroying a battalion of The Black Watch in the process and got involved in street fighting in St. Andre sur Orne. Kampfgruppe Zollhöfer of the 9th SS Panzer Division took over and struck towards Point 67. After Operation Spring 2nd Panzer was sent to the US sector to help in halting Operation Cobra. They could stop the drive of the US 2nd Armored for a moment but were too weak to cover the whole front. The division retreated and with its last 25 tanks it took part in Operation Luttich, the failed German counterattack at Mortain. It was later encircled in the Falaise pocket, but broke out with heavy losses in materiel and troops. At Falaise it was responsible for taking and holding St-Lambert-sur-Dive but was only able to take one part of the village. Nevertheless due to the efforts of the 2nd Panzer Division other German units, notably the 10th and the 12th SS, were able to cross the bridge over the Dives and escape eastwards. The division was reorganised in Germany, absorbing the depleted 352nd Infantry Division. Due to the shortage in materiel, the division's complement of tanks was significantly reduced. Some tank companies only had assault guns, although one battalion received Panther tanks.

=== Battle of the Bulge ===
The division was sent to the Western Front and attached to XLVII Panzer Corps, 5th Panzer Army which was preparing for the German offensive in the Ardennes region of Belgium (the Battle of the Bulge in December 1944). On the eve of battle, 2nd Panzer was about full strength, with 27 Panzer IVs, 58 Panthers, and 48 StuG III assault guns in the division tank parks. During the attack, 2nd Panzer drove towards the crucial road junction of Bastogne. However, Bastogne was quickly reinforced by the veteran 101st Airborne Division. Attacks against the town failed. On 18 December, in accordance with the original plan, 2nd Panzer was directed toward the Meuse River, but was unable to reach the Meuse, as American reinforcements threatened its flanks and supply line. Its vanguard got within 4 km from the Meuse, where on 24 December they were stopped by the U.S. 2nd Armored Division and the British 3rd Royal Tank Regiment. 2nd Panzer was forced to retreat by fierce American counterattacks and lack of petrol.

=== Battle of the Rhine ===
Now operating at an extremely reduced effectiveness, in the spring of 1945 the 2nd Panzer Division took part in the Battle of the Rhineland. In this, the Wehrmacht tried to halt the passage of the Allies across the River Rhine, and the division assisted as a component of the XIII Army Corps, of the 7th German Army, Heeresgruppe B.

The final engagement of the unit was at the city of Fulda in April 1945. The division surrendered in Saxony and north-western Czechoslovakia to the US forces on 7 May 1945.

== Commanders ==
The commanders of the division:

- Oberst Heinz Guderian (Creation - 31 January 1938)
- Generalleutnant Rudolf Veiel (1 February 1938 - 17 February 1942)
- Generalleutnant Hans-Karl Freiherr von Esebeck (17 February 1942 - 31 May 1942)
- Generalmajor Arno von Lenski (1 June 1942 - 30 June 1942)
- Generalleutnant Hans-Karl Freiherr von Esebeck (1 July 1942 - 10 August 1942) (Wounded)
- Oberst Karl Fabiunke (5 September 1942 - 30 September 1942)
- Generalleutnant Vollrath Lübbe (1 October 1942 - 31 January 1944)
- Generalleutnant Heinrich Freiherr von Lüttwitz (1 February 1944 - 4 May 1944)
- Generalleutnant Franz Westhoven (5 May 1944 - 26 May 1944)
- Generalleutnant Heinrich Freiherr von Lüttwitz (27 May 1944 - 31 August 1944)
- Oberst Eberhard von Nostitz (1 September 1944 - 4 September 1944)
- Generalmajor Henning Schönfeld (5 September 1944 - 14 December 1944)
- Generalmajor Meinrad von Lauchert (15 December 1944 - 19 March 1945)
- Generalmajor Oskar Munzel (20 March 1945 - 3 April 1945)
- Major i.G. Waldemar von Gazen (3 April 1945 - 4 April 1945)
- Oberst Karl Stollbrock (4 April 1945 - 8 May 1945)

== Organisation ==
The organisation of the division:

1939 – Poland	1943 – Eastern Front
Panzer-Brigade 2; Panzer-Regiment 3; Panzer-Regiment 4	Panzer-Regiment 3
Schützen-Brigade 2; Schützen-Regiment 2; Kradschützen-Bataillon 2	Panzer-Grenadier-Regiment 2; Panzer-Grenadier-Regiment 304
Artillerie-Regiment 74	Panzer-Artillerie-Regiment 74
	Heeres-Flak-Artillerie-Abteilung 273
Aufklärungs-Abteilung 5	Panzer-Aufklärungs-Abteilung 2
Panzerjäger-Abteilung 38	Panzerjäger-Abteilung 38
Pionier-Bataillon 38	Panzer-Pionier-Bataillon 38
Nachrichten-Abteilung 38	Panzer-Nachrichten-Abteilung 38
Nachschubtruppen 82	Panzer-Versorgungstruppen 82
