= Karl H. Timmermann =

United States Army officer (1922–1951)

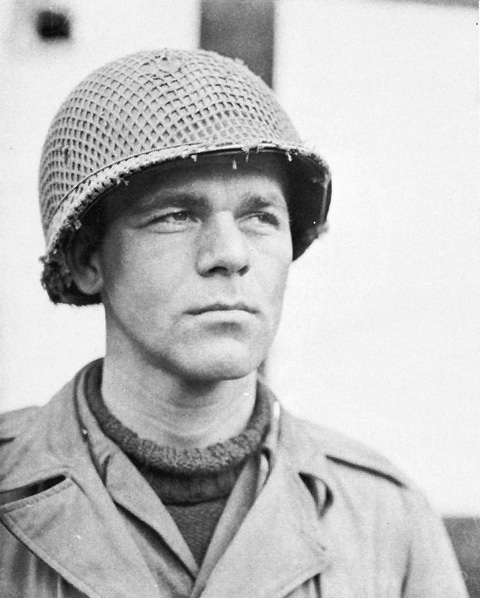
- Born: June 19, 1922; Frankfurt, Germany
- Died: October 21, 1951 (aged 29); Aurora, Colorado, U.S.
- Burial place: Fort Logan National Cemetery, Colorado; 39°38′50″N 105°02′42″W
- Military career
- Allegiance: United States
- Branch: United States Army
- Service years: 1942–1945; 1947–1951
- Rank: First Lieutenant
- Service number: 0-1311343
- Commands: Company A (Able), 27th Armored Infantry Battalion, Combat Command B, 9th Armored Division
- Conflicts: World War II; Korean War
- Awards: Distinguished Service Cross; Bronze Star Medal; Purple Heart

Karl Heinrich Timmermann (June 19, 1922 – October 21, 1951) was an American soldier and army officer.

Timmermann gained fame as the first U.S. Army officer to cross the Rhine River in Germany during World War II. He directed the assault across the bridge, helped remove explosive charges, and survived the German Army's attempt to demolish the Ludendorff Bridge at Remagen on March 7, 1945. He also saw action in the Korean War.

== Family ==
Karl's grandfather, Arnold Timmermann, emigrated from Altenmarhorst/Twistringen, in the German Empire, to Cuming County, Nebraska, in 1871. By 1881, Arnold's parents (John Henry and Helena Dames), a brother (John Henry), and a sister (Anna) had also arrived and settled in the Pebble Creek valley, north of the village of Dodge. Arnold married Anna Wortman on July 6, 1876 in West Point, Nebraska. Their son, John, was born on July 28, 1884.

John Timmermann enlisted in the U.S. Army on April 9, 1919 and became part of Company M of the Eighth Infantry in the U.S. Army of Occupation. While absent without leave in 1921, he met Maria Weisbecker. They married in Frankfurt and Maria gave birth to a son on June 19, 1922, whom the couple named Hans Karl Heinrich. By January 1924, the couple had come back to the United States and were in Nebraska. On August 16, 1928, John was discharged from the U.S. Army.

Timmermann attended the Guardian Angels School in West Point, Nebraska. His interest in military history led him to take part in the Citizens' Military Training Camps for two summers before his senior year of high school. He graduated in 1940. Young Karl was concerned about being of German descent with a growing war in Europe; he had been exposed to taunts regarding his father's supposed cowardice, desertion from the Army, and disgrace of the Timmermann family name. This sentiment caused Karl to declare with determination, "... I'm going to make it right again." Three other Timmermann siblings and a brother-in-law eventually joined the U.S. armed services "to redeem their name".

== Military service ==
On July 6, 1940, Timmermann enlisted in the U.S. Army. He was stationed at Fort Lewis, Washington, and assigned to the 15th Infantry Regiment of the 3rd Infantry Division. After the Japanese military attacked Pearl Harbor, his unit began training for war. The 3rd Infantry Division, with the 41st Infantry Division, were then part of IX Corps. In May 1941, the two divisions moved to the Hunter Liggett Military Reservation where June war games pitted them against Major General Joseph Stilwell's 7th Division and the 40th Division. Large-scale maneuvers continued in August on the Olympic Peninsula, with IX Corps defending Tacoma, Washington, until the two divisions from California could arrive to assist.

In October 1942, the 3rd Infantry Division headed for Norfolk, Virginia, then sailed for Morocco and Operation Torch, the invasion of French North Africa. Timmermann did not go with them, as he had been noted for his leadership ability and was selected for Officer Candidate School. He became a second lieutenant on February 16, 1943 at Fort Benning, Georgia. He was sent to Fort Riley, Kansas for armored infantry training, and was assigned as a platoon leader in Company A ("Able") of the 27th Armored Infantry Battalion, 9th Armored Division. (Note: The 52nd Infantry Regiment (United States) had been redesignated on July 15, 1942, as the 52nd Armored Infantry Regiment, assigned to the 9th Armored Division, and activated at Fort Riley, Kansas. This regiment was broken up October 9, 1943, at Camp Young and its elements reorganized and redesignated as elements of the 9th Armored Division as follows: 1. HHC, 52nd Armored Infantry Regiment (less 1st, 2d, and 3d Battalions) as the 52nd Armored Infantry Battalion.; 2. 1st Battalion as the 60th Armored Infantry Battalion.; 3. 2nd Battalion as the 27th Armored Infantry Battalion.; 4. 3rd Battalion disbanded, with the assets and personnel being mostly assumed by the 52nd Armored Infantry Battalion.; Reference: Stanton, Shelby L. (1984). Order of Battle: U.S. Army World War II. Novato, California: Presidio Press. pp. 621 W/Index. ISBN 0-89141-195-X.)

Due to his length of service, he was given a furlough home. During this leave, he became "acquainted" with LaVera Meyer. Timmermann proposed to her by letter with an enclosed ring, and she accepted by mail. On May 25, 1944, the couple were married in Omaha, Nebraska.

On August 20, 1944, the 27th Armored Infantry Battalion boarded the RMS Queen Mary, which arrived in Scotland on August 27. On September 28, Timmermann and his division arrived in France. The untested troops were placed in the Ardennes sector in Belgium. It was considered a quiet sector, good for green troops. In early December 1944, Timmermann met his brother Fritz, who was serving in an engineer battalion.

On December 16, 1944, the Germans started their offensive that became known to the Americans as the Battle of the Bulge. Timmermann, as a junior officer, was in the thick of the fighting near St. Vith with his platoon. His company's entire kitchen staff and supply sergeant were captured and later executed by the German SS troops in what became known as the Malmedy massacre. Timmermann was wounded in the arm by shell fragments during the fighting, but stayed with his unit until relieved. The Germans twice announced that the 9th Armored Division had been destroyed during the battle, but it fought on, earning the nickname "Phantom Division".

In late February 1945, Timmermann and the 9th Armored Division were supporting the right flank (or southern portion) of British Field Marshal Bernard Montgomery's forces. On February 28, Timmermann's daughter Gay Diane was born, but he did not learn of her birth for almost two weeks. On March 6, Timmermann's company commander was wounded in action and Timmermann was appointed by Lieutenant Colonel Leonard Engeman to take over Able company. He was also told that Able company was going to be the advance guard for a push to the Rhine River.

=== Battle for Ludendorff Bridge ===
At 1340 hours on March 7, 1945, the main American attack began on Remagen. As the Americans fought their way to the western (or left) edge of the bridge, the Germans set off explosives, creating a 10-meter wide crater in the ramp of the bridge. At 1500 hours, the Americans paused, waiting for the bridge to be demolished by the Germans, but nothing happened. Unbeknownst to the Americans, the Germans had already tried to destroy the bridge several times, and under fire were struggling to repair the demolition wires to blow up the bridge. Finally, the Americans decided to take the bridge, and the order went out.

At about 1530 hours, Timmermann was ordered to assault the bridge with his company in an effort to seize and hold it intact. Within five minutes, Timmermann was leading his under-strength company onto the bridge. Timmermann had designated half of his men to rush directly to the other side of the bridge to secure the east side and provide covering fire to the rest of the men. The other half swarmed the bridge, dodging machine gun fire, moving from girder to girder, and cutting wires and removing as many of the explosive charges as possible.

While we were running across the bridge ... I spotted this lieutenant, standing out there completely exposed to the machine gun fire that was pretty heavy by this time. He was cutting wires and kicking the German demolition charges off the bridge with his feet!

As Timmermann's men were approaching mid-span at 1540 hours, the eastern portion of the bridge was blown up by order of German Major Hans Scheller, but somehow remained standing; the bridge span had lifted slightly, and then dropped safely back into place. Timmermann and his men picked themselves up, continuing to cut wires and dump explosives into the water, while the other half continued their attack across the bridge. American engineers arrived and were ordered to take over removing demolition charges from the bridge. After being replaced by the engineers, the rest of Timmermann's men followed the first half of the company eastward across the Rhine.

At about 1545 hours, one of Timmermann's squad leaders, Sergeant Alexander A. Drabik of Holland, Ohio, was the first American soldier to cross the bridge. Drabik ran the entire 117-meter-long (384 ft) bridge with his squad through the settling dust and smoke from the explosion at the eastern end, without having a single soldier wounded or killed.

Drabik later said:

We ran down the middle of the bridge, shouting as we went. I didn't stop because I knew that if I kept moving they couldn't hit me. My men were in squad column and not one of them was hit. We took cover in some bomb craters. Then we just sat and waited for others to come. That's the way it was.

By about 1600 hours, Timmermann was isolated on the eastern side of the bridge. Friendly forces were trying to fill in the crater on the western side, while engineers were removing the last of the explosives. Other infantry units were moving up, but were being harassed by anti-aircraft weapons covering the western side of the bridge. Timmermann ordered some of his men up around the Erpeler Ley, a large hill just beyond the eastern end of the bridge, to destroy the weapons. The Germans abandoned their weapons and retreated. Timmermann's other men raced over the hill to cover the end of the railroad tunnel under the Erpeler Ley to prevent any enemy from reinforcing the Germans there. Within thirty minutes, these tasks were accomplished. Timmermann had 15 men with him in two shell craters and was waiting for reinforcements.

Unknown to Timmermann, about 300 German soldiers and civilians were hiding within the 325-meter long tunnel. In addition, they had four freight train cars loaded with ammunition and aircraft fuel. After a few attempts to escape, the Germans realized they were trapped. The German officers had orders to resist to the last man, but the soldiers became resigned to their fate, as did the civilians. Two German youths who had been enlisted as helpers for the anti-aircraft cannons, came forward out of the tunnel.

The first, named Willi Felten, yelled that they were surrendering and moved to the tunnel entrance; he was killed by a shot to the stomach. Another youth, named Karl Busch, stepped forward when a woman asked him to try to talk to the Americans. Busch knew some English from school and remembered a war film where the actor René Deltgen yelled "Stop firing" over and over to end the fighting. Young Busch cautiously went outside yelling "Stop firing!" in English over and over. The American shooting stopped and Lieutenant Timmermann asked him why. Busch said they wanted to surrender but were afraid of being shot.

Timmermann coaxed Busch out and talked with him. Busch described the situation in the tunnel and offered to translate for the surrender. The German officers were still reluctant to surrender, but Timmermann, through Busch, finally had a German officer emerge and a peaceful surrender was arranged. Some 200 soldiers and over 100 civilians, including young Busch's mother, were escorted over the bridge to safety. It was now a little after 1715 hours; less than two hours had passed. The only German killed in the railroad tunnel that afternoon was young Willi Felten.

After the withdrawal from the tunnel was negotiated Busch received a surprising compliment. "Well done," said Timmerman in perfect German. "He had German parents and wanted to test me," thought Busch, who made it through the negotiations with "lots of fear". Not only were many casualties avoided by these negotiations, but the U.S. troops were able to transport many troops and supplies across the river and according to Busch "able to end the war much quicker that way".

Allied journalists termed the bridge capture the "Miracle of Remagen". General Dwight D. Eisenhower declared the bridge "worth its weight in gold" and "one of those bright opportunities of war which, when quickly and firmly grasped, produce incalculable effects on future operations". It remained functional, but weakened, despite the German detonation of a small charge and a stronger charge a few minutes later. The Allies used the bridge for truck and tank traffic, and eight thousand soldiers crossed it during the first 24 hours after capture.

A large sign was placed on one of the stone towers marked "Cross the Rhine with dry feet courtesy of 9th Armd Division". The sign is now displayed at the Patton Museum of Cavalry and Armor at Fort Knox, Kentucky, above an M26 Pershing tank, a type used in the battle. During the days after the bridge capture, the U.S. 9th, 78th and 99th Infantry Divisions crossed the bridge. On March 17, 1945, despite furious German efforts to destroy it and Americans efforts to maintain it, the bridge collapsed. By then, Timmermann was on leave.

=== Gallery ===
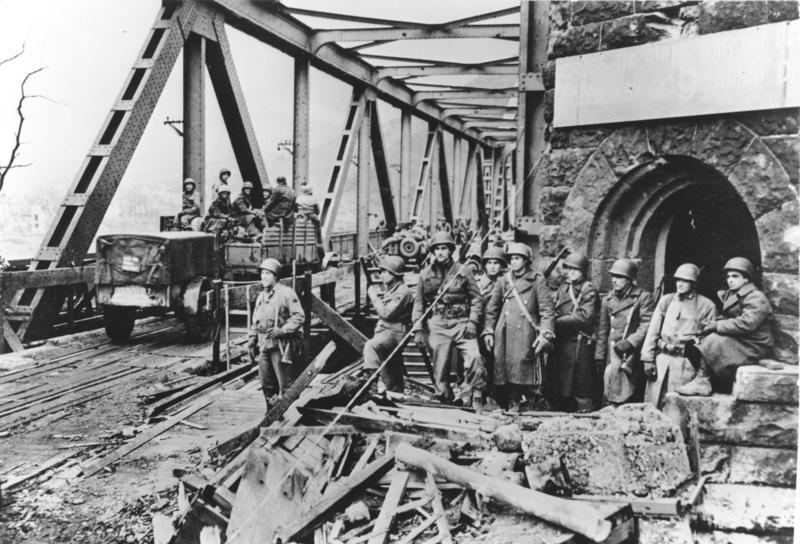
Ludendorff Bridge between 8 and 11 March 1945

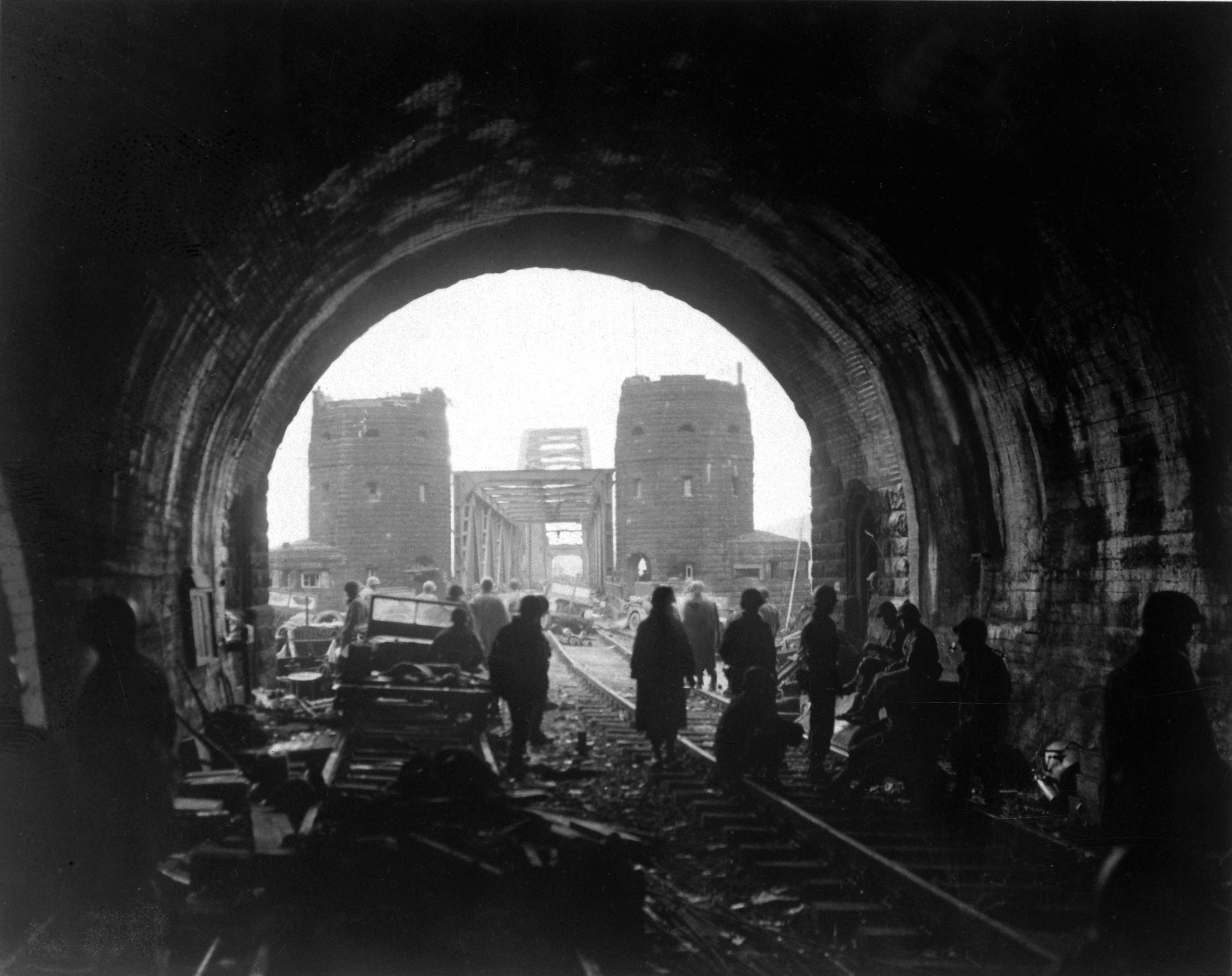
Ludendorff Bridge on 11 March 1945

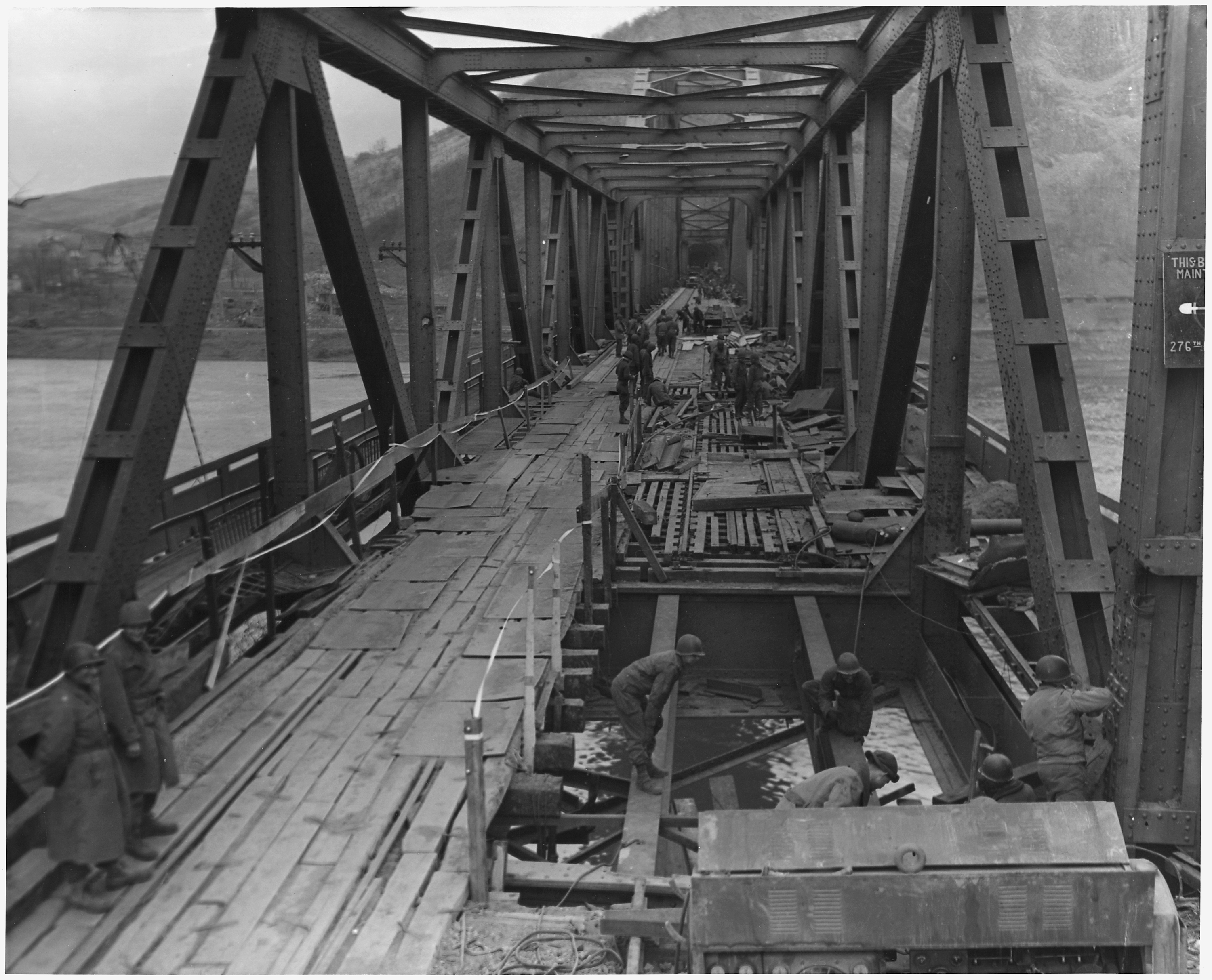
Ludendorff Bridge on 17 March 1945 four hours before the collapse

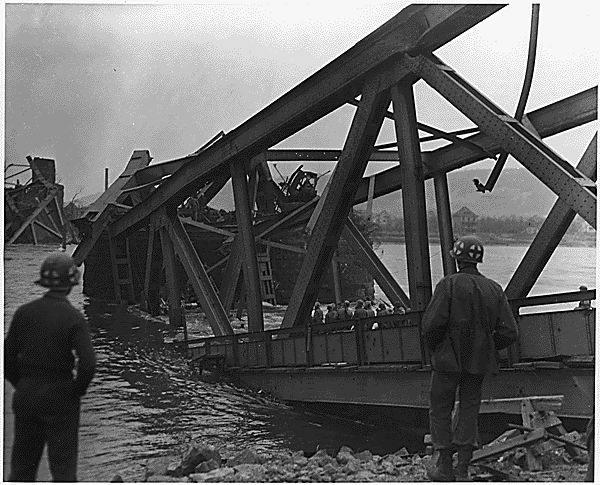
Ludendorff Bridge on 17 March 1945 after the collapse

=== Furlough and honor ===
US Army Presidential Unit Citation

Timmermann received a furlough to Paris, France. There, he read a Stars and Stripes article about the attack on the Remagen Bridge and learned he was the father of a baby girl. He also found out he was considered a hero. As news of "one of the war's most electrifying feats" filled Allied newspapers, Timmermann became a celebrity. He met Ernie Pyle and other reporters who listened to Timmermann describe how his men were the real heroes.

The Omaha World-Herald reflected what other media reported. "[T]he young lieutenant from West Point, Nebraska, pulled off a bridge finesse that will go down in history. Lt. Timmermann led with the only card he had, raw courage." Timmermann had restored his family name and honor.

Sergeant Alexander A. Drabik and Timmermann were awarded the Distinguished Service Cross for their actions.

Distinguished Service Cross

Timmermann's Distinguished Service Cross citation reads:

For extraordinary heroism in action against the enemy on 7 March, in Germany. Upon reaching the Ludendorff railroad bridge across the Rhine river, Second Lieutenant Timmermann, aware that the bridge had been prepared for demolition, and in the face of heavy machine gun, small arms, and direct 20 mm gun fire, began a hazardous trip across the span. Although artillery shells and two explosions rocked the bridge, he continued his advance. Upon reaching the bridge towers on the far side he cleared them of snipers and demolition crews. Still braving intense machine gun and shell fire, he reached the eastern side of the river where he eliminated hostile snipers and gun crews from along the river bank and on the face of bluff overlooking the river. By his outstanding heroism and unflinching valor, Second Lieutenant Timmermann contributed materially to the establishment of the first bridgehead across the Rhine river.

Combat Command B of the 9th Armored was awarded the Presidential Unit Citation for capturing the bridge.

=== Discharge and reenlistment ===
Timmermann was discharged from the Army on December 12, 1945. He became a salesman in Nebraska, raising his family. Timmermann missed Army life and tried to rejoin as an officer. However, all officer billets were full, so he enlisted as a technical sergeant in the Regular Army on October 28, 1947. He became a recruiter, and later an instructor with the Officers' Reserve Corps in Omaha, Nebraska.

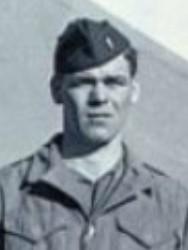
Timmermann, September 1945

With the start of the 'Cold War,' Timmermann was commissioned as a first lieutenant on December 26, 1948. He was assigned to Fort Omaha and the Seventh Mechanized Cavalry Reconnaissance Troop of the Seventh Infantry Division.

=== Korea and death ===
Timmermann landed with the 7th Infantry Division at Inchon, South Korea, in September 1950. He fought with his unit for several months before seeking medical treatment for ongoing abdominal pain. He was diagnosed with testicular cancer and sent back to the U.S. to Fitzsimons Hospital near Denver, Colorado, for treatment. Timmermann underwent surgery to remove the tumor, but treatment was unsuccessful. He died on October 21, 1951, at age 29. He was given a full military burial at Fort Logan National Cemetery in Colorado. A Denver reporter wrote that "the cancer called war had failed to take his life in two tries". His wife LaVera recalled, "He detested cancer because of the fact that it was killing him and depriving him of a soldierly duty ... He made me promise to polish up his silver stripe (bar), his buttons and his medals for the burial. He wanted every battle ribbon in proper place on his chest. He wanted to be as soldierly as possible."

== Memorials ==
On May 30, 1965, Timmermann Park in West Point, Nebraska, was dedicated to his memory. The following books were written about Timmermann:

- Hechler, Ken (1957). The Bridge at Remagen: The Amazing Story of March 7, 1945 (1st Edition Hardcover ed.). Ballantine Books.
- Hechler, Ken (2004). Hero of the Rhine: The Karl Timmermann Story (1st ed.). Pictorial Histories. ISBN 978-1575101101.

Timmermann is honored in the following media and work:

- A memorial dedicated to his actions capturing the Ludendorff Bridge during World War II was dedicated on March 7, 1995 in Timmerman Park in West Point.
- A Hollywood film inspired by a book written about its capture, The Bridge at Remagen, was made in 1969. George Segal played the character Lieutenant Phil Hartman, loosely based on Timmermann. Ben Gazzara as Sergeant Angelo was very loosely based on Sgt. Alexander A. Drabik, the first soldier across the bridge. The movie portrayed the battle with a lot of angst and bloodshed contrary to real events.
- The Ludendorff Bridge features prominently in the final mission of the game Call of Duty: Finest Hour, in which the player must cross the bridge in order to capture it.
- The Karl Timmermann Memorial Bridge over the Elkhorn River in West Point, Nebraska, Timmermann's hometown, is named after him.
- The post theater in Fort Dix, New Jersey, is named "Timmermann Theater" in his honor.
- The post theater in Ferris Kasserne (Barracks), Erlangen, West Germany, was also named "Timmermann Theater" in his honor.
