= Alexander A. Drabik =

American soldier in World War II

Alexander Albert Drabik
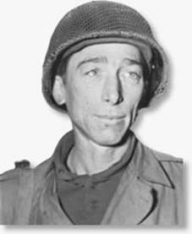
- Alexander A. Drabik, Sgt., US Army
- Born: December 28, 1910 near, Holland, Springfield Township, Lucas County, Ohio
- Died: September 28, 1993 (aged 82); Columbia, Boone County, Missouri
- Burial place: Resurrection Cemetery, Toledo, Lucas, Ohio
- Military career
- Allegiance: United States of America
- Branch: United States Army
- Service years: 1942–1945
- Rank: Staff Sergeant
- Units: Company A (Able), 27th Armored Infantry Battalion, Combat Command B, 9th Armored Division
- Conflicts: World War II
- Awards: Distinguished Service Cross; Purple Heart

Sgt. Alexander Albert Drabik (December 28, 1910 – September 28, 1993) was the first American soldier to cross the Ludendorff Bridge over the Rhine river at Remagen, Germany in World War II during the Battle of Remagen. He led two other enlisted men across the bridge, running 398 metres (1,306 ft) while under fire, knowing that the demolition charges attached to the bridge could be detonated at any moment. He was awarded the Distinguished Service Cross for his action.

== Biography ==
Drabik was the son of John D. and Frances (née Lewandowski) Drabik, Polish immigrants from Szymborze, Germany, now Poland. They raised thirteen children on a farm near Holland and Toledo, Ohio. Alex, youngest son of 14 children, attended Dorr Street School. He enlisted in the United States Army in October 1942. Prior to his enlistment, he worked as a butcher in Holland, Ohio.

=== Military career ===
Early in his military career, he distinguished himself by rescuing 120 recruits who had become lost in the California desert. Drabik was seriously wounded during the Battle of the Bulge.

Squad leader Drabik, part of Able Company, 27th Armored Infantry Battalion, Combat Command B, 9th Armored Division received orders from Company commander, Lt. Karl H. Timmermann to assault the Ludendorff Bridge near Remagen on March 7, 1945, in an effort to seize and hold it. Under heavy machine-gun fire, Drabik dashed across the bridge while Germans tried desperately to detonate it. He lost his helmet on the way. Drabik was the first American soldier to reach the east side of the bridge. For his heroism, Drabik was awarded the Distinguished Service Cross. Drabik's Distinguished Service Cross citation reads:

The President of the United States of America, authorized by Act of Congress July 9, 1918, takes pleasure in presenting the Distinguished Service Cross to Sergeant Alexander A. Drabik (ASN: 35345618), United States Army, for extraordinary heroism in connection with military operations against an armed enemy while serving with the 27th Armored Infantry Battalion, 9th Armored Division, in action against enemy forces on 7 March 1945 in Germany. Upon reaching the Ludendorf railroad bridge crossing the Rhine River, Sergeant Drabik, aware that the bridge was prepared for demolition, and in the face of heavy machine gun, small arms, and direct 20-mm. gunfire, began a hazardous trip across the span. Although artillery shells and two explosions rocked the bridge, he continued his advance. Upon reaching the bridge towers on the far side, he cleared them of snipers and demolition crews. Still braving the intense machine gun and shell fire, he reached the eastern side of the river where he eliminated hostile snipers and gun crews from along the bank and on the face of the bluff overlooking the river. By his outstanding heroism and unflinching valor, Sergeant Drabik, contributed materially to the establishment of the first bridgehead across the Rhine River. General Orders: Headquarters, First U.S. Army, General Orders No. 49 (March 27, 1945)

U.S. Representative Marcy Kaptur (D-OH) has repeatedly sponsored legislation to award him the Medal of Honor.

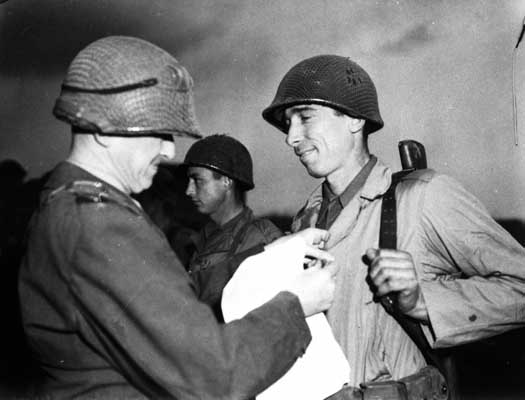
Drabik is awarded the Distinguished Service Cross from MG John W. Leonard, April 1945.

Drabik later said:

We ran down the middle of the bridge, shouting as we went. I didn't stop because I knew that if I kept moving they couldn't hit me. My men were in squad column and not one of them was hit. We took cover in some bomb craters. Then we just sat and waited for others to come. That's the way it was.

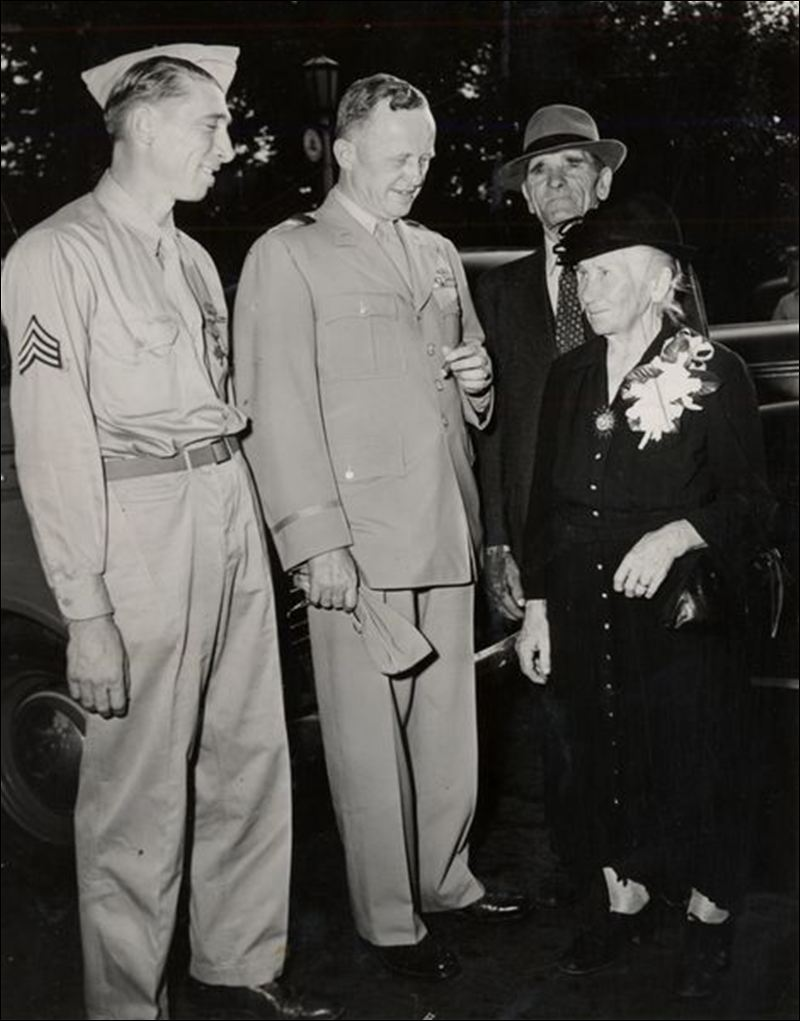
Major General John W. Leonard, Sgt. Alexander A. Drabik and his parents in Toledo Zoo on August 18, 1945.

On August 18, 1945, Toledo honored him and his commanding officer, Maj. Gen. John W. Leonard, with a parade.

=== Decorations ===

Combat Infantryman Badge
Distinguished Service Cross		Purple Heart	Good Conduct Ribbon
American Campaign Medal	European-African-Middle Eastern Campaign Medal with three service stars	World War II Victory Medal	Belgian War Medal 1940-1945

== Death ==
Drabik was killed in an auto accident in 1993, en route to a reunion of his unit.

== In media ==
The book Hechler, Ken (2004). Hero of the Rhine: The Karl Timerrmann Story (1st ed.). Pictorial Histories. ISBN 978-1-57510-110-1. mentions Drabik.

Drabik is referenced in a Hollywood film inspired by a book written about its capture, The Bridge at Remagen, was made in 1969. The actor George Segal played the character Lieutenant Phil Hartman, based on Lt. Timmermann. Ben Gazzara as Sergeant Angelo was based on Sgt. Alexander A. Drabik the first soldier across the bridge.
