= Pebble Creek =

Pebble Creek may refer to:

- Pebble Creek, Florida, an unincorporated community
- Pebble Creek, Idaho, an alpine ski area
- Pebble Creek (Missouri), a stream in Missouri
- Pebble Creek (Elkhorn River), a river in Nebraska
- Pebble Creek Formation, a volcanic formation in British Columbia
- Pebble Creek Hot Springs Pemberton Valley in British Columbia
