= Kürten (disambiguation) =

Kürten [ˈkyːʁtən] is a German surname and the name of a village in North Rhine-Westphalia, Germany, Kürten. Notable people with the surname include:

- David Kurten (born 1971), British politician
- Dieter Kürten, German journalist
- Gustavo Kuerten (born 1976), Brazilian tennis player
- Hans Peter Kürten, mayor of Remagen
- Jessica Kürten (1969–), Irish equestrian
- Peter Kürten (1883–1931), German serial killer, The Vampire of Düsseldorf

- Dedicated to Peter Kürten, 1981 album by Whitehouse

== See also ==
- Kerton, surname
