= Franz Surges =

German composer and musician

Franz Surges (11 October 1958 – 20 September 2015) was a German composer and musician.

== Education ==
Surges was born in Remagen, Germany. He studied at the Episcopal School for Church Music, Aachen, and at the Cologne Conservatoire, Department Aachen. He took the following exams:

- Cantor-exam (called A-exam)
- Diploma in Music Pedagogy (Organ)
- Diploma of the Artistic final-exam, main subject organ
- Diploma in Music Pedagogy (note-setting)

He took further lessons in composition with Tilo Medek.

He completed international masterclasses resp. music academies, e.g. by Jean Guillou, Piet Kee, Guy Bovet, Harald Vogel, Monserrat Torrent.

== Position and awards ==
From 1981 Franz Surges was a church musician at St. Antony, Eschweiler-Roehe (since 2006 also St. Michael, Eschweiler), composer, choir director and music teacher, among others, for church-musical (so-called C-exams).

Franz Surges obtained a number of prizes and awards, including:

- First prize composition contest "in Furtherance of Contemporaneous Music Maintenance in Religious Services", Schwäbisch Gmuend (1991) within the framework of the festival "European Church Music"
- First Prize composition contest "Mayrhofer-Prize", Passau, Germany, 2002
- First Prize composition contest in the town of Siegburg, 2006

== Oeuvre ==
Surges composed works in various genres: choral (male chorus, female chorus, mixed chorus), orchestral, chamber (strings, woodwinds, brass, piano, organ), instrumental and vocal.

== Literature ==
- Anthology of information about Franz Surges (in German)
