= John W. Leonard =

US Army general (1890–1974)

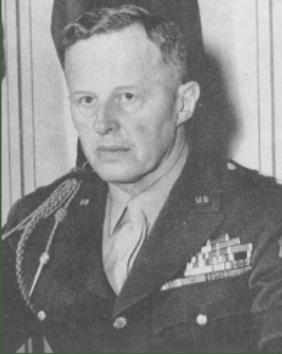
- Born: January 25, 1890; Toledo, Ohio, U.S.
- Died: October 26, 1974 (aged 84); Fort Sam Houston, Texas, U.S.
- Burial place: Arlington National Cemetery
- Alma mater: United States Military Academy
- Military career
- Allegiance: United States
- Branch: United States Army
- Service years: 1915–1952
- Rank: Lieutenant General
- Service number: 0-3840
- Unit: Infantry Branch
- Commands: 3rd Battalion, 6th Infantry Regiment; 9th Armored Division; 20th Armored Division; 2nd Armored Division; V Corps; XVIII Airborne Corps
- Conflicts: World War I; Battle of Saint-Mihiel; Meuse–Argonne offensive; World War II; Battle of Normandy; Battle of the Bulge; Battle of Remagen; Cold War
- Awards: Distinguished Service Cross; Army Distinguished Service Medal

John William Leonard (January 25, 1890 – October 26, 1974) was a lieutenant general in the United States Army who commanded the 9th Armored Division during World War II.

== Early years and West Point ==
John William Leonard was born on January 25, 1890, in Toledo, Ohio, to Dennis W. and Anastasia (Sheahan) Leonard. John was the second of eight children, including four sons and four daughters, raised in the South Side neighborhood of Toledo. All four of Leonard's grandparents were born in Ireland before immigrating to the United States. Prior to his West Point appointments, he took his tests at Columbus Barracks, Ohio.

Leonard was appointed to the United States Military Academy in 1911 and was part of "the class the stars fell on," a famous class that contained many future generals such as Omar Bradley and Dwight D. Eisenhower. When asked about Leonard's relationship with Eisenhower at West Point, Leonard stated the two were "pretty darned close," explaining they were in the same company for four years, the same division for at least one year, and stated to his best recollection Eisenhower and Paul A. Hodgson lived across the hallway from him. Ultimately, he would finish 84th out of 164 graduates in 1915 and would be commissioned as a second lieutenant with the 6th Infantry out of Fort Bliss, Texas.

== World War I ==
His first war service was at Mexico–United States border. Then, in May 1918, he was sent as a member of the 6th Infantry Regiment of the 5th Infantry Division within American Expeditionary Forces to the France.

Reaching the rank of major, Leonard commanded a battalion of the 6th Infantry Regiment during Battle of Saint-Mihiel and Meuse-Argonne Offensive. For his bravery on the battlefield near the village of Romagne-sous-Montfaucon, Major Leonard was promoted to the rank of lieutenant colonel and decorated with the Distinguished Service Cross, Purple Heart French Legion of Honor, Croix de Guerre with Palm and French Fourragère.

=== Distinguished Service Cross citation ===
His official Distinguished Service Cross citation reads:

General Orders: War Department, General Orders No. 37 (1919)
Action Date: October 14, 1918
Name: John William Leonard
Service: Army
Rank: Lieutenant Colonel
Regiment: 6th Infantry Regiment
Division: 5th Division, American Expeditionary Forces
Citation: The President of the United States of America, authorized by Act of Congress, July 9, 1918, takes pleasure in presenting the Distinguished Service Cross to Lieutenant Colonel (Infantry), [then Major] John William Leonard (ASN: 0-3840), United States Army, for extraordinary heroism in action while serving with 6th Infantry Regiment, 5th Division, A.E.F., near Romagne, France, 14 October 1918. Lieutenant Colonel Leonard personally led the assaulting wave in an attack under severe shell and machine-gun fire from the front arid flanks. Upon reaching the objective he directed the organization of the position, and by his example of fearlessness rallied his men and kept his line intact.

After the war, Leonard stayed in Europe for occupation duties until October, 1921. Then he served on various posts, including a posting to Tientsin China 1933–1936. In 1936, Leonard was appointed an Instructor for Maryland National Guard and stayed in this capacity until 1940. Then he spent some time on the staff of the 2nd Infantry Division under command of Major General James Lawton Collins.

== World War II ==
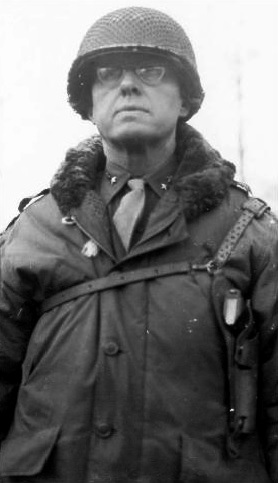
Leonard in 1945

During the year 1941, Leonard was promoted to the capacity of the commanding officer of the 6th Armored Infantry Regiment, which was now a part of the 1st Armored Division under the command of Major General Bruce Magruder. During this time, 6th Armored Infantry Regiment was stationed with whole 1st Armored Division at Fort Knox in Kentucky. Leonard was promoted to the rank of brigadier general on June 20, 1942.

During the summer of 1942 Brigadier General Leonard was put in command of the newly activated 9th Armored Division at Fort Riley, Kansas. In this capacity, Leonard replaced Major General Geoffrey Keyes at the end of September, 1942. On October 27, 1942, Leonard got his second star, when he was promoted to the rank of major general.

Two years later, in September 1944, 9th Armored Division was transferred to the United Kingdom, from where it was immediately ordered to Normandy.

Leonard continued as its commander until the end of the war, when he became commander of the 20th Armored Division. During the period between the wars, he served as commandant of the Armor School from 1946, and as military attaché in the United Kingdom from 1948. In 1950 he was promoted to lieutenant general and commanded both the V Corps and the XVIII Airborne Corps when it was reestablished on 31 May 1951. He retired from the army in January 1952.

== Personal life and death ==
Leonard's father, Dennis, was a train engineer involved in a March 1916 train accident in Amherst, Ohio, which left 27 dead and 47 injured. While not at fault for the accident and escaping physical injuries-despite Leonard and his fireman having to break out of their overturned locomotive-he suffered from severe mental health issues following the incident. He was deeply affected by the gruesome scene he witnessed, ultimately dying several months later, in August 1916.

Leonard would credit Dwight D. Eisenhower for introducing him to his future wife, Eileen O'Brien. The couple would marry in April 1918 and would stay together until Leonard's death in 1974, having three children. He would ultimately retire from the Army in 1952 after nearly 40 years of service at the rank of lieutenant general. Upon retirement, he would reside in San Antonio, Texas. He would pass away in Fort Sam Houston on his way to Brooke Army Medical Center on October 26, 1974, due to atherosclerosis. Leonard is interred at Arlington National Cemetery, where he lies with his wife following her death in 1990.

== Decorations ==
Lieutenant General Leonard's ribbon bar:

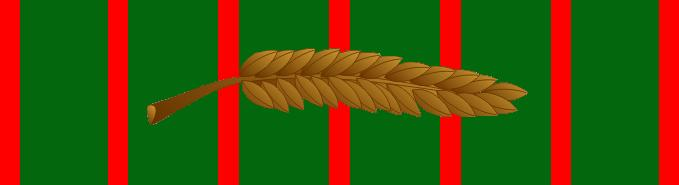
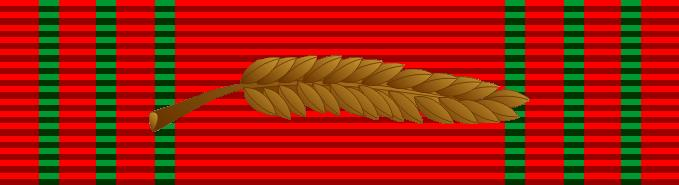

| 1st Row | Distinguished Service Cross | | Army Distinguished Service Medal | |
| 2nd Row | Silver Star | Legion of Merit w/ Oak Leaf Cluster | Bronze Star Medal w/ Oak Leaf Cluster | Purple Heart |
| 3rd Row | Mexican Border Service Medal | World War I Victory Medal w/ three battle clasps | Army of Occupation of Germany Medal | American Defense Service Medal |
| 4th Row | American Campaign Medal | European-African-Middle Eastern Campaign Medal w/ four service stars | World War II Victory Medal | Army of Occupation Medal |
| 5th Row | National Defense Service Medal | Officer of the Legion of Honour | French Croix de guerre 1914–1918 w/ palm | Croix de guerre (Belgium) w/ palm |

== Gallery ==
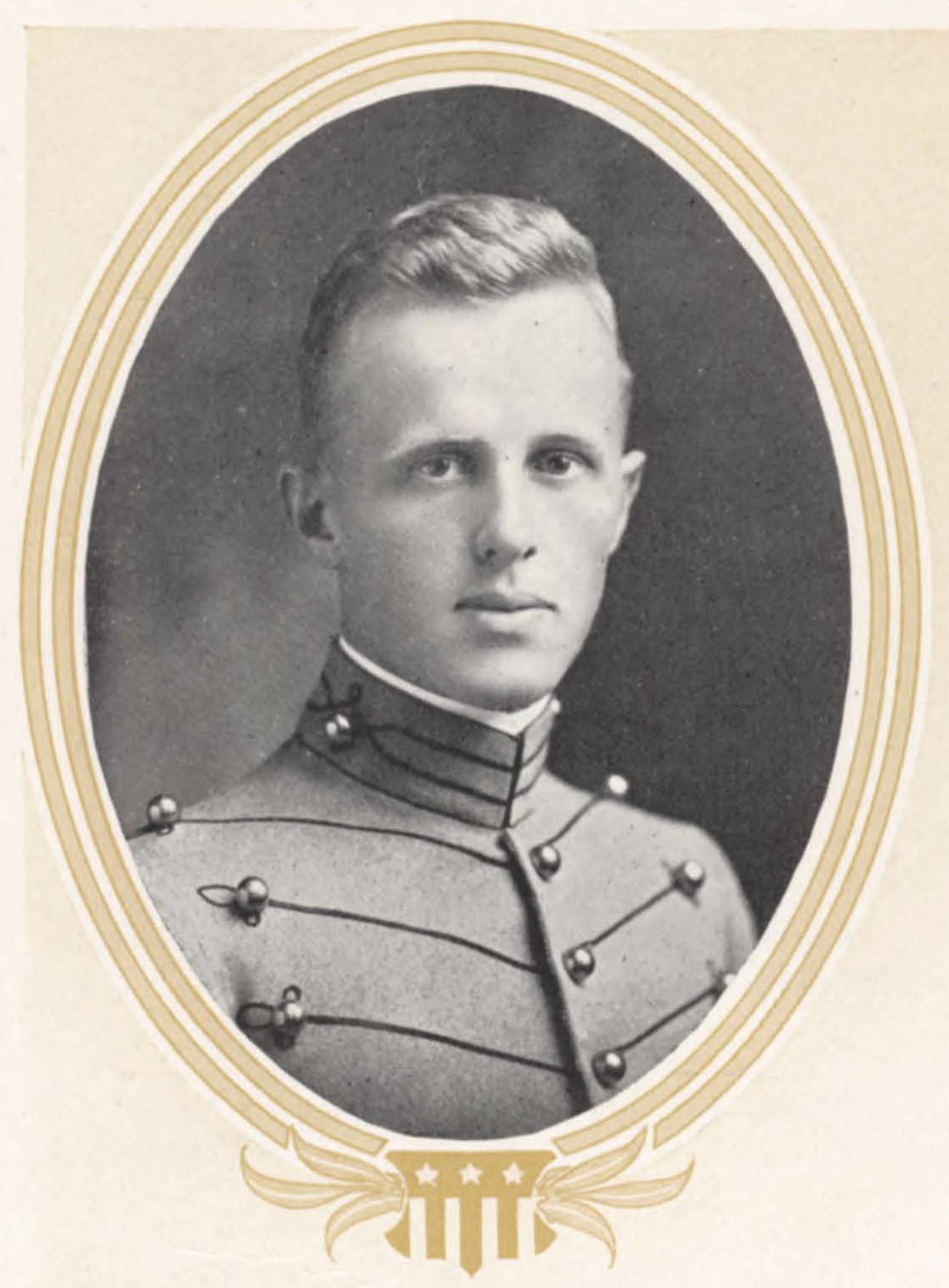
John W. Leonard as a West Point cadet.

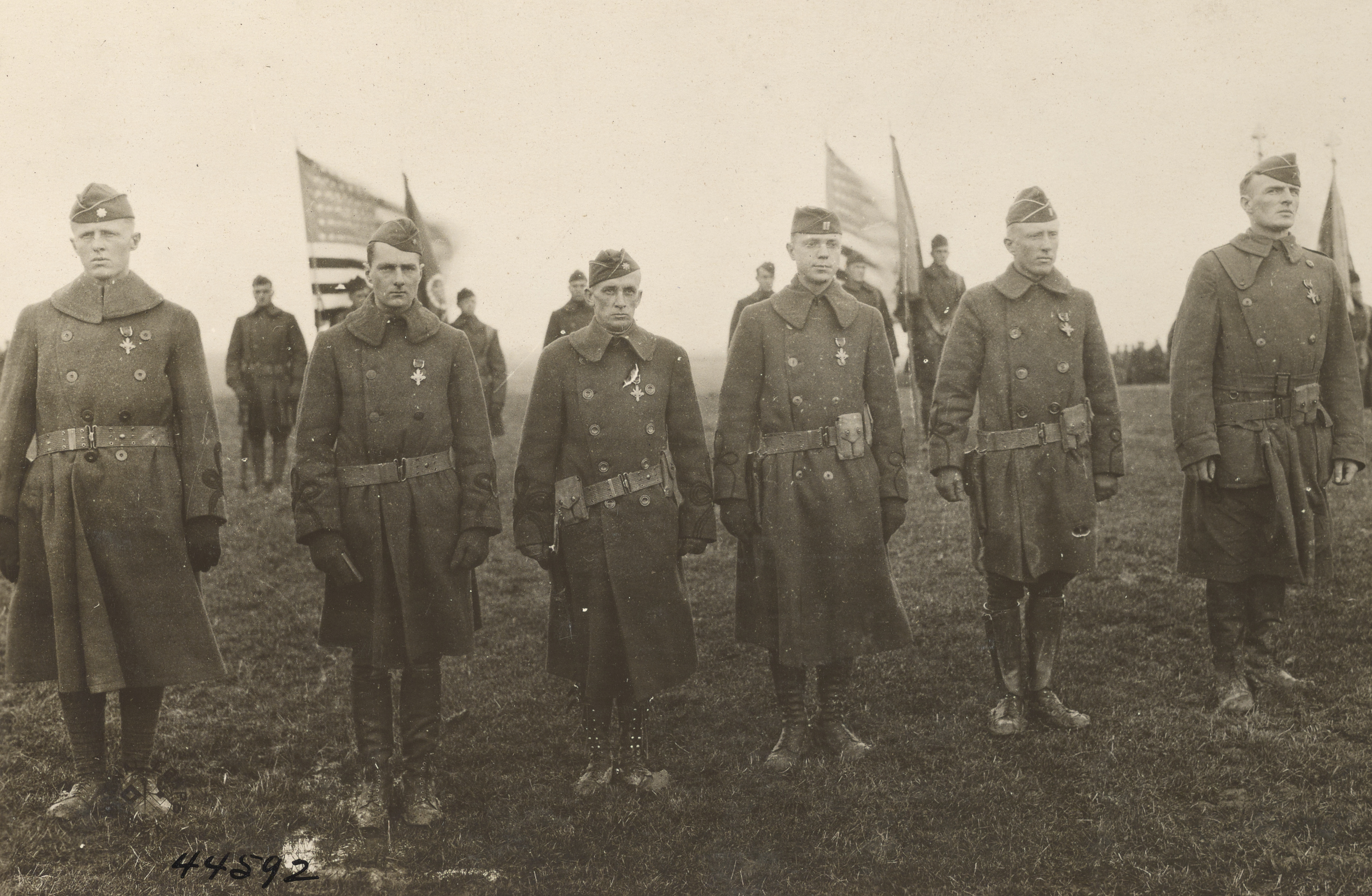
Officers just decorated with the DSC by Major General Hanson Ely, commanding the 5th Division, at Esch, Luxembourg, December 30, 1918. On the extreme left is Lieutenant Colonel John W. Leonard, 60th Infantry.

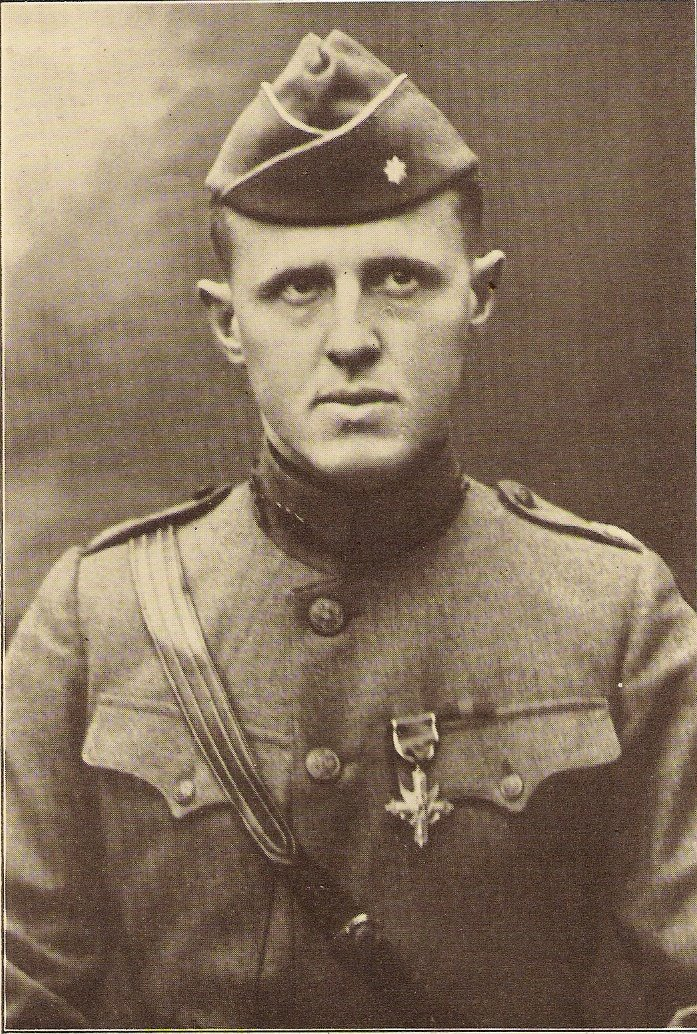
John W. Leonard as a major during World War I after he received his Distinguished Service Cross.

High ranking officers discuss the situation near Wiltz, Luxembourg, November 1944. From left to right: Major General John W. Leonard, Major General Troy H. Middleton, Lieutenant General Omar Bradley, and General Dwight D. Eisenhower.

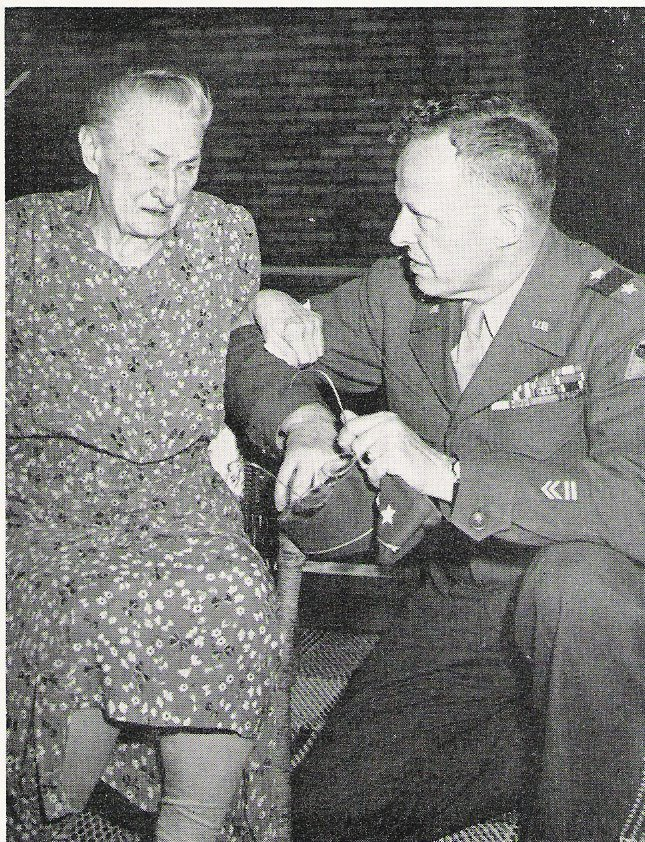
Major General John W. Leonard with his mother Anastasia during his visit in the US. His mother died in 1948.

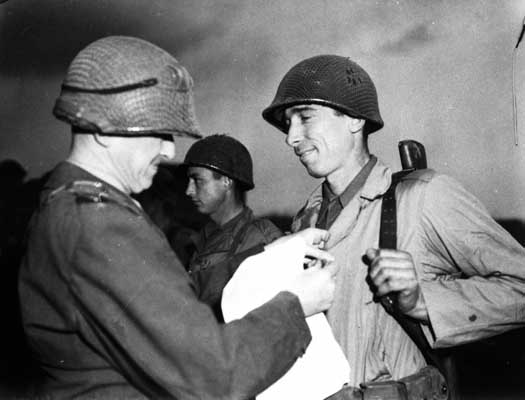
Sgt. Alexander A. Drabik receiving a Distinguished Service Cross for his actions during the Battle of Remagen from the MG John W. Leonard, Commanding officer of the 9th Armored Division.

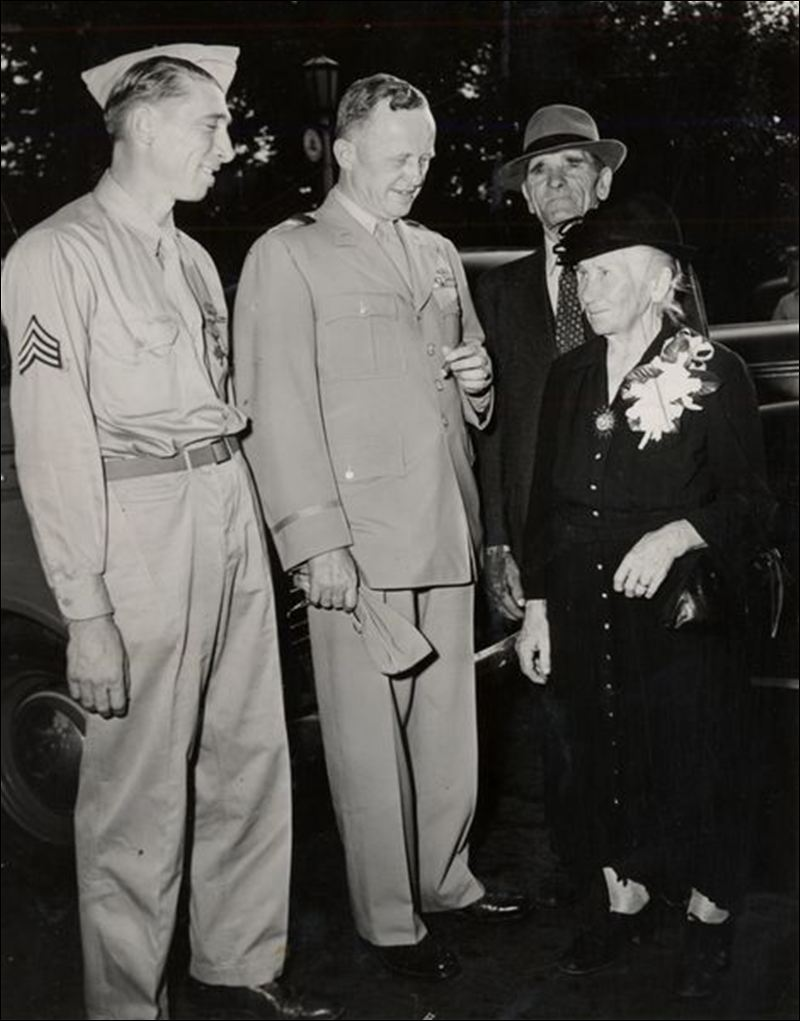
Major General John W. Leonard, Sgt. Alexander A. Drabik and his Parents in Toledo Zoo on August 18, 1945.

Military offices
| Preceded by Geoffrey Keyes | Commanding General 9th Armored Division; 1942–1945 | Succeeded by Post deactivated |
| Preceded by Orlando Ward | Commanding General 20th Armored Division; 1945–1946 | Succeeded by Post deactivated |
| Preceded by John M. Devine | Commanding General 2nd Armored Division; April–July 1946 | Succeeded by Leland Hobbs |
| Preceded by John R. Hodge | Commanding General V Corps; 1950–1951 | Succeeded by Boniface Campbell |
| Preceded by ?? | Commanding General XVIII Airborne Corps; 1952 | Succeeded by ?? |
