= The Bridge at Remagen =

1969 American film by John Guillermin

- Theatrical poster
- Directed by: John Guillermin
- Screenplay by: William Roberts; Richard Yates; Ray Rigby (uncredited)
- Story by: Roger O. Hirson
- Based on: The Bridge at Remagen (1957 book) by Ken Hechler
- Produced by: David L. Wolper
- Starring: George Segal; Robert Vaughn; Ben Gazzara; Bradford Dillman; Anna Gael; E. G. Marshall
- Cinematography: Stanley Cortez
- Edited by: William Cartwright
- Music by: Elmer Bernstein
- Production company: Wolper Pictures, Ltd.
- Distributed by: United Artists
- Release dates: June 25, 1969 (Huntington, premiere); July 16, 1969 (U.S.)
- Running time: 117 minutes
- Country: United States
- Language: English
- Budget: $5 million
- Box office: $1.6 million (US/ Canada rentals)

The Bridge at Remagen is a 1969 American war film directed by John Guillermin for United Artists, and starring George Segal, Robert Vaughn, Ben Gazzara, Bradford Dillman, Anna Gael, E. G. Marshall, and Peter Van Eyck. It is based on the non-fiction book by writer and U.S. Representative Ken Hechler, about the Battle of Remagen in March 1945.

The film is a dramatized version of actual events during the last months of World War II, when the U.S. 9th Armored Division approached Remagen and captured the intact Ludendorff Bridge. While the real battle ran for 10 days and involved several artillery duels between the U.S. troops and German defenders, the film focuses more specifically on the heroism and human cost in gaining the bridgehead across the Rhine before the Allies' final advance into Germany.

== Plot ==
U.S. Army forces approach the Oberkassel railway bridge over the Rhine River in the last weeks of World War II and the Germans blow it up before it can be captured. Allied commanders realize the Rhine is the last major obstacle to their advance and crossing it would shorten the war. The commander of the U.S. 9th Armored Division finds the 27th Armored Infantry, commanded by hard-charging Major Barnes, is once again his lead unit. He tells Barnes it's likely the Germans will blow up the last remaining Rhine bridge at Remagen, but to keep pushing forward to clear the west side of the river and force the remnants of the German 15th Army to surrender.

Lieutenant Phil Hartman is one of Barnes' experienced and war-weary platoon leaders. After the death of his company commander, Captain John Colt, he's promoted and ordered to continue the advance toward the Rhine. When Hartman's men capture Meckenheim without resistance, Hartman is ordered to keep going a further 12 miles (20 km) to Remagen. Expecting the bridge there to be destroyed, Barnes promises Hartman and his men a rest once they've cleared the town.

Major Paul Kreuger of the German Army is assigned to command the defense of the Remagen bridge by Colonel General von Brock, whose own orders are to destroy it immediately. The general gives Kreuger a verbal order to keep the bridge open for retreating units of the German 15th Army, which would otherwise be annihilated west of the river. Kreuger inspects his defenses, bolstering morale with promises of tank support guaranteed by von Brock. When Hartman's troops attack the outer defenses of the town Kreuger finds his promised tank support has been sent elsewhere.

Finding the bridge intact, General Shinner orders Major Barnes to rush the far end and secure it. Barnes finds Hartman's company at the west end of the bridge and orders them to attack. When Hartman asks him to lead the assault, Barnes refuses and threatens Hartman with his carbine. Sergeant Angelo strikes Barnes and the weary Hartman defuses the situation by leading the company onto the bridge. As they rush forward, German explosives engineers detonate the demolition charges. The weak industrial explosives fail to destroy the structure and Hartman's troops secure a tenuous bridgehead on the east bank of the Rhine.

Unable to counterattack, Kreuger leaves his tiny defensive force and returns to headquarters to make a personal appeal for reinforcements, finding the headquarters building seized by the SS, and Von Brock under arrest. Kreuger is accused of cowardice and also arrested. At Remagen, Hartman leads a raid against a machine-gun nest on a river barge, and Angelo goes missing in action. Also desperate for reinforcements, Hartman makes a single-handed advance on the last German defenders just as the first M24 Chaffee tanks cross the bridge. The last defenders surrender.

In the aftermath of the battle, Hartman discovers Angelo alive, and Kreuger is executed by an SS firing squad. The end titles inform the viewer that the bridge at Remagen collapsed into the Rhine ten days after its capture. (Note: The Remagen bridge was never rebuilt; the towers on each bank were converted into a museum and arts studios.)

== Cast ==
- George Segal as Lieutenant Phil Hartman, based on Lieutenant Karl Timmermann
- Robert Vaughn as Major Paul Kreuger, based on Major Johannes 'Hans' Scheller
- Ben Gazzara as Sergeant Angelo, composite of Sergeants Alexander Drabik and Joseph DeLisio
- Bradford Dillman as Major Barnes, based loosely on Major Murray L. Deevers
- E. G. Marshall as General Shinner, based on Brigadier General William Hoge
- Peter Van Eyck as Generaloberst Von Brock, based loosely on General Otto Hitzfeld
- Hans Christian Blech as Hauptmann Karl Schmidt, based on Hauptmann Willi Bratge
- Heinz Reincke as Councillor Holzgang, the mayor in charge of civil defence
- Joachim Hansen as Hauptmann Otto Baumann, engineering officer, based on Hauptmann Carl Friesenhahn
- Sonja Ziemann as Greta Holzgang
- Anna Gael as French Girl
- Bo Hopkins as Corporal Grebs
- Robert Logan as Private Bissell
- Matt Clark as Corporal Jellicoe
- Steve Sandor as Private Slavek
- Frank Webb as Private Glover
- Tom Heaton as Lieutenant Pattison, based on Lieutenant Emmett James "Jim" Burrows
- Paul Prokop as Captain John Colt
- Richard Münch as General Von Sturmer, based on Feldmarschall Walter Model
- Günter Meisner as SS-Obergruppenführer Gerlach
- Rudolf Jelínek as Pvt. Manfred
- Václav Neužil as Sgt. Becker

== Original book ==
The film was based on a book by Ken Hechler, a war historian who was serving in the U.S. Army in 1945. "I was lucky to be about 10 miles from Remagen when the electrifying news came down that the bridge had been captured," said Hechler later. "We had just liberated this wine cellar. The first units came back and were sent into reserve, and had nothing to do but drink wine and talk about what they had done."

The resulting interviews, plus postwar interviews with German soldiers who were at the bridge during the Battle of Remagen, formed the bulk of the research for Hechler's book, which was published in 1957. The book ended up selling over 500,000 copies.

Hechler used money from the book to finance his successful campaign to represent West Virginia's 4th congressional district in the United States House of Representatives in the 1958 elections.

== Production ==
=== Development ===
In May 1958, film rights were purchased by Schulberg Productions, owned by Budd Schulberg, who had witnessed the crossing and intended to film it as The Day We Crossed the Rhine. It was meant to follow Schulberg's film Wind Across the Everglades. Schulberg said Stanley Kubrick was interested in directing and the film would be made in West Germany. Columbia agreed to finance. In November 1960, Schulberg said the film would start shooting in May 1961 with financing from the Mirisch Company and United Artists, but the film was not made by Schulberg.

In 1965, the rights were bought by David Wolper. It was to be the first in a six-picture deal he signed with United Artists. Irvin Kershner was to direct. Roger O. Hirson was signed to write the script. A few months later, Richard Yates was reportedly working on the script. Later on William Roberts, Rod Serling, and Theodore Strauss worked on it. These delays meant Wolper ended up making another war film first, The Devil's Brigade. Hechler says he was only offered $5,000 for the use of the book. "They told me if I held out for more money, they'd change the name from The Bridge at Remagen to The Remagen Bridge and base it on newspaper accounts, which were public domain and covered the event widely at the time."

=== Casting ===
By April 1968, George Segal had signed to star and John Guillermin was to direct. Ben Gazzara then agreed to sign – his first feature in three years. Robert Vaughn joined soon after. "I decided to get young actors," said Wolper. "You can't get Kirk Douglas and Burt Lancaster – who are older than General Eisenhower." Robert Blake was cast in a role but departed in order to spend more time with his family, while Alex Cord declined to be in the film.

== Filming ==
West German officials would not allow the film to be made in West Germany because of shipping traffic on the Rhine. The trend was increasing at the time to shoot Hollywood films in Eastern Europe to save money – The Fixer was filmed in Hungary and Castle Keep in Yugoslavia. Correspondingly, after six months of location scouting, The Bridge at Remagen became the first American film to be shot in Communist Czechoslovakia. According to a British press report, £833,000 of the £2,100,000 budget were saved by shooting in Czechoslovakia.

=== Czechoslovakia ===
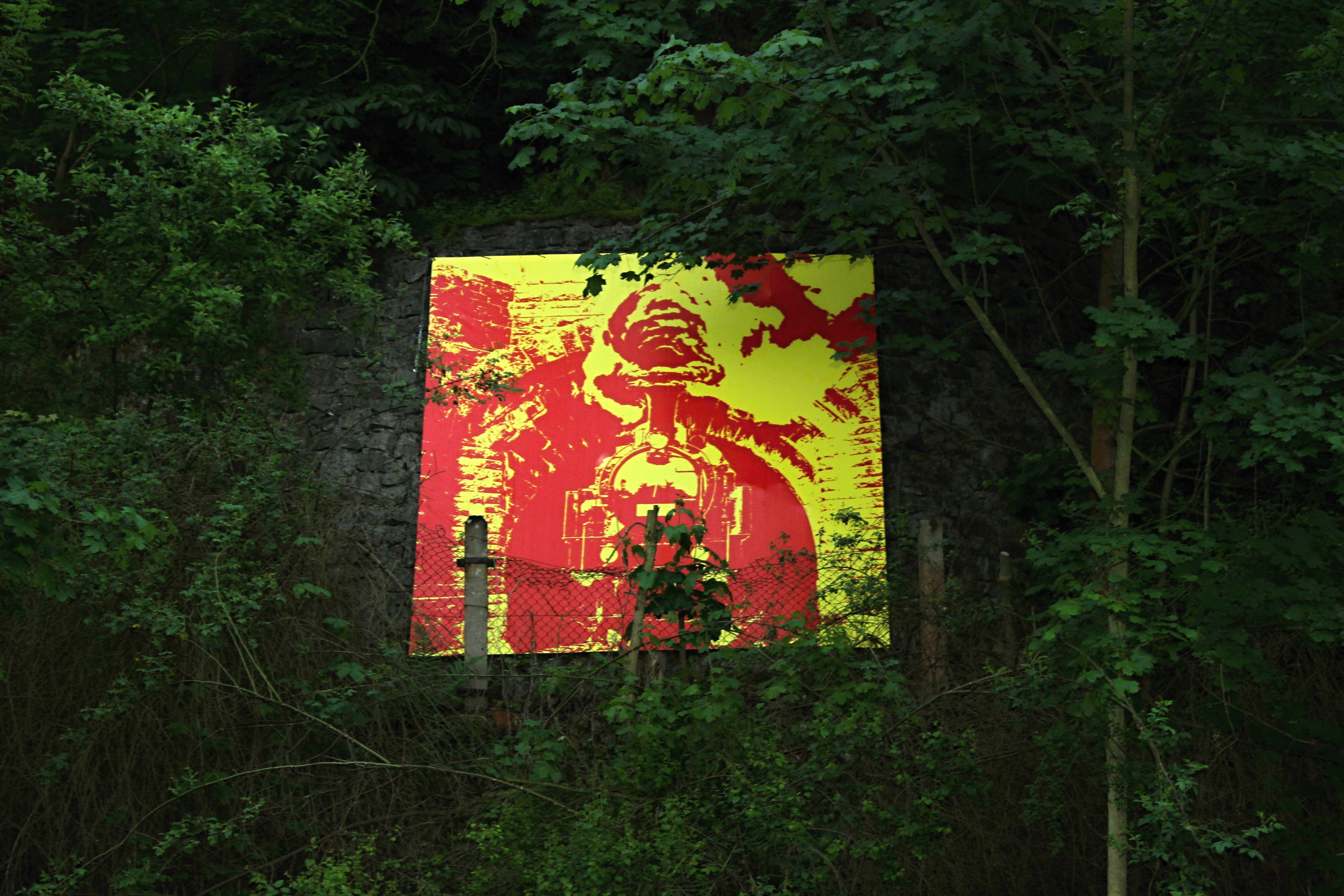
Remains of a bridge in Davle, Czech Republic, where scenes for the Remagen Bridge were shot

Wolper paid $750,000 and Czechoslovak distribution rights to Barrandov Studios in exchange for their facilities and local labor. The U.S. World War II equipment was borrowed from the government of Austria, which had originally obtained it from the Americans. The Czechoslovak government provided German uniforms and weapons that had been captured during the war. Czechoslovak People's Army soldiers served as extras in the film, and were even trained to use U.S. military equipment.

Filming started on June 6, 1968, and was meant to be completed by October, but shooting was difficult from the start. The production manager fell ill, and the first assistant director quit. Also, clashes in work methods occurred within the crew, of whom roughly 60 were from the West and 200 were Czech. However, after an awkward start, the Westerners and Czechs eventually forged a decent working relationship.

It was a period of political instability in Czechoslovakia due to the Prague Spring. The film crew was accused by the Soviet and East German presses of smuggling weapons into the country and serving as a cover for the CIA. The Czechs, however, did not take this charge too seriously, and Czech members of the crew jokingly referring to Wolper as "Mr. CIA". After East German newspaper Neues Deutschland alleged that the production was a front for preparations of a U.S. Armed Forces occupation of the country, some Czechoslovak police and military officials did inspect the arsenal of arms at Barrandov studios and found everything in order.

Many of the Remagen town scenes were shot in the city of Most. The old town was being demolished and rebuilt at a new location at the time so that the lignite deposits under its soil would become accessible for mining. This lent an unprecedented level of realism to the explosions of real buildings rather than backlot sets.

The Remagen Bridge scenes were shot at Davle on the Vltava River using the old bridge, which the Czechoslovak Ministry of Transportation closed for the summer. This was controversial because many residents of Prague used the bridge to access vacation homes in Davle. Fake towers and a fake railway tunnel were constructed for the film. The film's opening scenes, where the U.S. Army fails to capture the Oberkassel, Bonn bridge, were shot just south of the village of Vrané nad Vltavou using the railway bridge, which carries the Prague-Dobříš line over the river Vltava.

During filming, Guillermin told producer Wolper that he did not want the distraction of Wolper being on set, and tried to ban the producer from it. Wolper responded by telling Guillermin that if he could not direct with Wolper on set, then he would be fired. Guillermin promptly apologized. Wolper later called Guillermin "a real pain in the ass".

=== Soviet invasion ===
On 20 August 1968, when the film was two-thirds complete, the Soviet Army invaded Czechoslovakia to reinstall a hardline Communist government. Filming had to be halted and the bulk of the cast and crew were stuck in the International Hotel in Prague under advice from the U.S. Embassy. Wolper had flown out from Prague to Rome the night of the invasion to supervise filming of his other film If It's Tuesday, This Must Be Belgium and then quickly flew to Vienna to negotiate with the new government for permission for the film's crew to be released.

The cast and crew voted on whether to stay or leave. Only three voted to stay — Guillermin and two stuntmen. Some cast and crew, including future U.S. Ambassador to Czechoslovakia Shirley Temple Black, left in a 400-car convoy that took them to Plzeň and then to Nuremberg. A few hours later, 79 cast and crew escaped in a 20-car caravan driven by Czechs. They travelled to Gmünd in Austria, one hour before the border was closed, after which they travelled to Vienna.

Items left behind included many personal possessions, the last five days' worth of filming, and $1 million worth of equipment, including eight tanks and four cameras of unprocessed film. "It was just like an adventure movie," said Bradford Dillman, "except the tragedy was real." Some had to flee to Vienna in a 60-car convoy.

Wolper said, "circumstances have conspired to turn an innocent and expensive enterprise into a political football." The issues caused the budget to increase from $3.5 million to $5 million.

=== West Germany ===
Filming resumed in Hamburg, West Germany, where ideal studio facilities were available, in October 1968. Unfinished scenes involving the bridge were shot at Castel Gandolfo in Italy. Wolper also negotiated filming of the blowing up of the bridge in Prague.

Wolper later wrote, "the actors get on the bridge in Czechoslovakia, remove explosive under the bridge in Germany and get off the bridge in Italy." "If we bring some unity to this picture it will be a miracle," said Robert Vaughn.

Wolper says the film had insurance to cover an invasion, but that the insurance company argued that it was not an invasion, rather the government invited the Russians in. The matter settled and Wolper got some compensation, but not the full amount. Contrary to Wolper's expectations, the Soviet occupation force allowed the U.S. military equipment lent by the Austrian government to be returned. The film finished after 93 days.

== Historical accuracy ==
According to Ken Hechler, "although Hollywood has its own ideas of the truth, probably 95% of it is accurate. It was doubly exciting to see the good actors they got to portray it." Hechler says the opening scene of the tanks going fast was not true. "They said it was more exciting that way. Also, there were several scenes with women, which I never saw in 1945. There's a little bit of a love interest there."

Hechler also says the names of the participants were changed, "I imagine to avoid lawsuits", and he was "very happy with" the film, "because it brought attention to one of the great examples of the initiative and training of the American soldiers. They took advantage of an opportunity that had not been planned at all. It's also a tribute to the leadership of [Lt.] Karl Timmermann, who was the first officer who crossed."

== Release ==
The Bridge at Remagen was released in theatres on June 25, 1969. The ABC network broadcast the film on television in the U.S. on July 24, 1977.

=== Home media ===
The film was released on DVD by MGM Home Entertainment on January 24, 2006 and January 31, 2006.

== Reception ==
=== Critical response ===
The film holds a 20% on Rotten Tomatoes, based on 5 reviews, with an average rating of 5.60 out of 10.

Wolper says, "perhaps it was not the best idea to distribute a film about war and heroism at the height of the war in Vietnam. The film received mixed reviews. It was accused of being too realistic and not realistic enough ... Given the circumstances, I think it is a fine picture and it plays quite often on television."

== 2007 radio play ==
In 2007, Vaughn played himself in a BBC Radio 4 dramatization of the events surrounding the invasion.

== See also ==
- List of American films of 1969
- A Bridge Too Far (1977 film) — another World War II battle involving a bridge that occurred about six months earlier in the Netherlands

== Sources ==
- Wolper, David L. (2003). Producer: A Memoir. Scribner. ISBN 9780743236874.
