= West Point, Nebraska =

- City
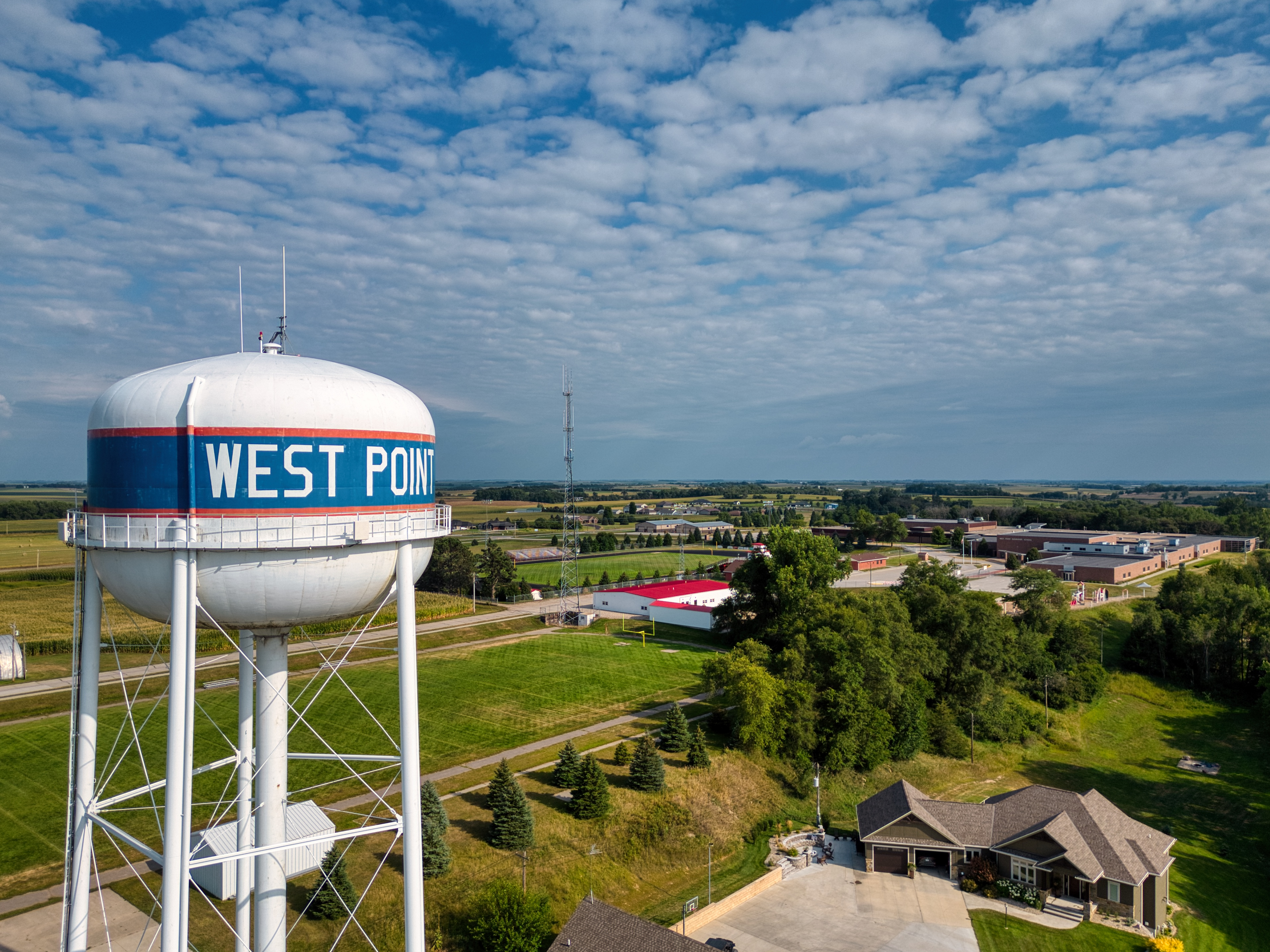
- Aerial view of water tower in West Point, NE

- Logo

- Location of West Point, Nebraska
- Coordinates: 41°50′17″N 96°42′21″W
- Country: United States
- State: Nebraska
- County: Cuming

Area
  - Total: 2.85 sq mi (7.39 km^{2})
  - Land: 2.84 sq mi (7.35 km^{2})
  - Water: 0.012 sq mi (0.03 km^{2})
- Elevation: 1,404 ft (428 m)

Population (2020)
  - Total: 3,500
  - Density: 1,232.5/sq mi (475.88/km^{2})
- Time zone: UTC-6 (Central (CST))
  - Summer (DST): UTC-5 (CDT)
- ZIP code: 68788
- Area code: 402
- FIPS code: 31-52575
- GNIS feature ID: 838328
- Website: ci.west-point.ne.us

West Point is a city in and the county seat of Cuming County, Nebraska, United States. The population was 3,504 at the 2020 census.

== History ==
West Point was founded in the spring of 1857, when Omaha businessmen formed the Nebraska Settlement Association in order to find suitable townsites in the Elkhorn Valley. Uriah, John, and Andrew Bruner (three brothers from Pennsylvania), and William Sexauer chose its location on a bend along a river, which they called New Philadelphia. The name was soon changed to West Point because it was the westernmost outpost along the valley.

West Point became the county seat of Cuming County on October 12, 1858, after winning the election over the community of DeWitt. A total of 19 votes were split between the two towns with West Point obtaining 12 votes. By the spring of 1859, over 4,000 Pawnee natives flooded the Elkhorn Valley during a hunting excursion and, displeased to find white settlers in the valley, burned several homesteads and killed livestock. The so-called Pawnee War ended near Battle Creek without a fight.

West Point grew slowly at first, but with the coming of the railroad in 1870, its population boomed to over 700.

By the mid-1970s, the future of railroad service came into question. The Chicago & North Western tracks had been experiencing declining freight traffic volumes. Revenue railroad service ended in spring of 1982, when flooding from the Elkhorn River damaged sections of the track. With freight traffic declining and flooding damage, the C&NW filed a request with the Interstate Commerce Commission to abandon the line. Permission was granted a short time later, leaving the tracks with a dismal future. Plans were made to revive railroad service from the newly formed Fremont & Elkhorn Valley Railroad, who purchased the abandoned C&NW track. Those plans were to bring tourists in that got on the train in Fremont & possibly run freight. However, the costs were too high to revive railroad service, and the tracks were removed in 1988.

On August 26, 2019, the DHHS announced that the city's water was unsafe to drink after a year of complaints from citizens of the town. The maximum safe level of manganese for infants had been exceeded by over 700 micrograms per mL.

== Geography ==
According to the United States Census Bureau, the city has a total area of 2.73 square miles (7.07 km^{2}), of which 2.72 square miles (7.04 km^{2}) is land and 0.01 square miles (0.03 km^{2}) is water. West Point lies on the eastern bank of the Elkhorn River.

=== Climate ===
Climate data for West Point, Nebraska (1991–2020, extremes 1892–present)
Month	Jan	Feb	Mar	Apr	May	Jun	Jul	Aug	Sep	Oct	Nov	Dec	Year
Record high °F (°C)	69 (21)	75 (24)	92 (33)	100 (38)	105 (41)	108 (42)	113 (45)	111 (44)	105 (41)	96 (36)	84 (29)	75 (24)	113 (45)
Mean maximum °F (°C)	53.8 (12.1)	59.2 (15.1)	73.7 (23.2)	83.3 (28.5)	90.4 (32.4)	94.7 (34.8)	95.4 (35.2)	93.6 (34.2)	90.6 (32.6)	85.0 (29.4)	70.5 (21.4)	56.3 (13.5)	97.2 (36.2)
Mean daily maximum °F (°C)	30.4 (−0.9)	35.1 (1.7)	47.7 (8.7)	60.3 (15.7)	71.3 (21.8)	81.3 (27.4)	85.0 (29.4)	82.7 (28.2)	76.4 (24.7)	63.5 (17.5)	47.7 (8.7)	34.6 (1.4)	59.7 (15.4)
Daily mean °F (°C)	20.5 (−6.4)	24.8 (−4.0)	36.7 (2.6)	48.5 (9.2)	60.3 (15.7)	70.8 (21.6)	74.8 (23.8)	72.3 (22.4)	64.2 (17.9)	51.0 (10.6)	36.8 (2.7)	25.1 (−3.8)	48.8 (9.3)
Mean daily minimum °F (°C)	10.7 (−11.8)	14.5 (−9.7)	25.6 (−3.6)	36.7 (2.6)	49.3 (9.6)	60.3 (15.7)	64.5 (18.1)	61.8 (16.6)	52.0 (11.1)	38.6 (3.7)	25.9 (−3.4)	15.6 (−9.1)	38.0 (3.3)
Mean minimum °F (°C)	−11.6 (−24.2)	−5.8 (−21.0)	4.8 (−15.1)	21.3 (−5.9)	34.0 (1.1)	47.0 (8.3)	52.0 (11.1)	50.0 (10.0)	36.4 (2.4)	22.5 (−5.3)	9.4 (−12.6)	−4.6 (−20.3)	−15.2 (−26.2)
Record low °F (°C)	−38 (−39)	−33 (−36)	−22 (−30)	3 (−16)	20 (−7)	36 (2)	41 (5)	39 (4)	22 (−6)	5 (−15)	−14 (−26)	−27 (−33)	−38 (−39)
Average precipitation inches (mm)	0.69 (18)	0.86 (22)	1.66 (42)	3.41 (87)	4.20 (107)	5.23 (133)	3.31 (84)	3.91 (99)	3.02 (77)	2.14 (54)	1.34 (34)	1.04 (26)	30.81 (783)
Average snowfall inches (cm)	5.9 (15)	7.6 (19)	4.1 (10)	1.8 (4.6)	0.1 (0.25)	0.0 (0.0)	0.0 (0.0)	0.0 (0.0)	0.0 (0.0)	0.5 (1.3)	2.6 (6.6)	6.3 (16)	28.9 (73)
Average precipitation days (≥ 0.01 in)	6.1	6.0	7.6	10.2	12.6	11.3	9.5	9.0	8.4	7.5	5.6	6.0	99.8
Average snowy days (≥ 0.1 in)	4.6	4.2	2.5	0.8	0.0	0.0	0.0	0.0	0.0	0.3	1.6	4.1	18.1
Source: NOAA

== Demographics ==
Historical population
Census	Pop.	Note	%±
1860	14		—
1870	520		3,614.3%
1880	1,009		94.0%
1890	1,842		82.6%
1900	1,890		2.6%
1910	1,776		−6.0%
1920	2,002		12.7%
1930	2,225		11.1%
1940	2,510		12.8%
1950	2,658		5.9%
1960	2,921		9.9%
1970	3,385		15.9%
1980	3,609		6.6%
1990	3,250		−9.9%
2000	3,660		12.6%
2010	3,364		−8.1%
2020	3,500		4.0%
2021 (est.)	3,473		−0.8%
U.S. Decennial Census

=== 2020 census ===
As of the 2020 census, West Point had a population of 3,500. The median age was 40.3 years. 25.1% of residents were under the age of 18 and 21.1% of residents were 65 years of age or older. For every 100 females there were 97.9 males, and for every 100 females age 18 and over there were 96.8 males age 18 and over.

0.0% of residents lived in urban areas, while 100.0% lived in rural areas.

There were 1,456 households in West Point, of which 29.4% had children under the age of 18 living in them. Of all households, 52.3% were married-couple households, 19.0% were households with a male householder and no spouse or partner present, and 24.1% were households with a female householder and no spouse or partner present. About 32.6% of all households were made up of individuals and 16.1% had someone living alone who was 65 years of age or older.

There were 1,642 housing units, of which 11.3% were vacant. The homeowner vacancy rate was 1.3% and the rental vacancy rate was 18.9%.

Racial composition as of the 2020 census
Race	Number	Percent
White	2,746	78.5%
Black or African American	8	0.2%
American Indian and Alaska Native	34	1.0%
Asian	8	0.2%
Native Hawaiian and Other Pacific Islander	1	0.0%
Some other race	496	14.2%
Two or more races	207	5.9%
Hispanic or Latino (of any race)	845	24.1%

=== 2010 census ===
As of the census of 2010, there were 3,364 people, 1,432 households, and 899 families living in the city. The population density was 1,236.8 inhabitants per square mile (477.5/km^{2}). There were 1,580 housing units at an average density of 580.9 per square mile (224.3/km^{2}). The racial makeup of the city was 87.7% White, 0.3% African American, 0.4% Native American, 0.3% Asian, 0.1% Pacific Islander, 10.3% from other races, and 1.0% from two or more races. Hispanic or Latino of any race were 16.8% of the population.

There were 1,432 households, of which 27.4% had children under the age of 18 living with them, 52.0% were married couples living together, 7.3% had a female householder with no husband present, 3.5% had a male householder with no wife present, and 37.2% were non-families. 34.1% of all households were made up of individuals, and 19.4% had someone living alone who was 65 years of age or older. The average household size was 2.31 and the average family size was 2.97.

The median age in the city was 43.2 years. 25.5% of residents were under the age of 18; 5.4% were between the ages of 18 and 24; 20.9% were from 25 to 44; 25.6% were from 45 to 64; and 22.6% were 65 years of age or older. The gender makeup of the city was 48.1% male and 51.9% female.

=== 2000 census ===
As of the census of 2000, there were 3,660 people, 1,432 households, and 946 families living in the city. The population density was 1,479.2 inhabitants per square mile (571.1/km^{2}). There were 1,552 housing units at an average density of 627.3 per square mile (242.2/km^{2}). The racial makeup of the city was 92.02% White, 0.22% African American, 0.41% Native American, 0.16% Asian, 5.74% from other races, and 1.45% from two or more races. Hispanic or Latino of any race were 12.02% of the population.

There were 1,432 households, out of which 30.7% had children under the age of 18 living with them, 56.7% were married couples living together, 6.7% had a female householder with no husband present, and 33.9% were non-families. 30.2% of all households were made up of individuals, and 18.1% had someone living alone who was 65 years of age or older. The average household size was 2.45 and the average family size was 3.04.

In the city, the population was spread out, with 25.1% under the age of 18, 7.0% from 18 to 24, 25.0% from 25 to 44, 19.6% from 45 to 64, and 23.2% who were 65 years of age or older. The median age was 40 years. For every 100 females, there were 96.8 males. For every 100 females age 18 and over, there were 92.3 males.

As of 2000 the median income for a household in the city was $32,616, and the median income for a family was $38,702. Males had a median income of $27,981 versus $20,774 for females. The per capita income for the city was $19,053. About 5.4% of families and 9.0% of the population were below the poverty line, including 8.9% of those under age 18 and 6.8% of those age 65 or over.

== Education ==
The school district is West Point Public Schools.

== Notable people ==
- Lawrence Bruner, entomologist
- Richard C. Hunter, U.S. Senator from Nebraska
- Eldon Johnson, Oregon state representative
- Martin E. Marty, religious scholar
- Karl H. Timmermann, U.S. Army officer during World War II
- Edward K. Valentine, U.S. Representative from Nebraska and Sergeant at Arms of the U.S. Senate
- Tim Walz, governor of Minnesota and 2024 Democratic nominee for Vice President of the United States
