= Pebble Creek (Missouri) =

- Location within Missouri Location within the United States

Physical characteristics
- Source
  - coordinates: 38°39′57″N 90°23′53″W
- Mouth
  - coordinates: 38°38′30″N 90°24′00″W

Pebble Creek is a stream in the U.S. state of Missouri. The 1.9-mile (3.1 km) long stream is a tributary to Deer Creek.

The name "Pebble Creek" has been in use since at least 1949.
