= Hans Peter Kürten =

Hans Peter Kürten (15 May 1929 in Langenfeld/Rheinland – 6 March 2022 in Remagen) was the mayor of Remagen from 1964 to 1994 and opened the Peace Museum at Remagen in 1980.

Hans Peter Kürten was extremely successful at selling bits of the Ludendorff Bridge support pylon stones as souvenirs which had to be removed from the Rhine because they were inhibiting navigation through the town of Remagen in Ahrweiler.

He was succeeded by Lorenz Denn of the SPD party, who was mayor of Remagen for 8 years until approximately 2002.
