= Remagen =

Town in Rhineland-Palatinate, Germany

- Town
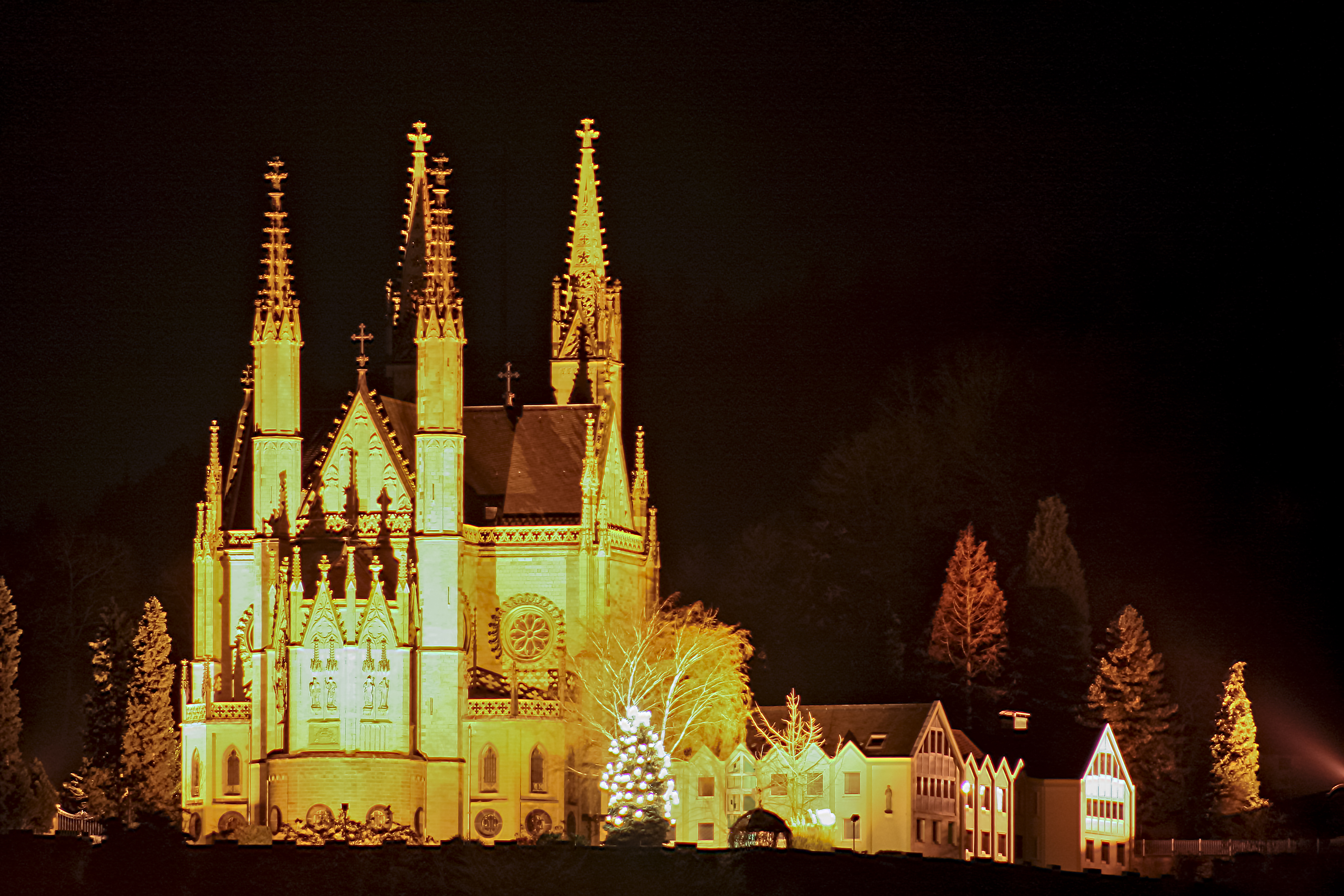
- Apollinariskirche

- Coat of arms

- Location of Remagen within Ahrweiler district
- Interactive map of Remagen
- Location within Germany Location within Rhineland-Palatinate
- Coordinates: 50°34′43″N 7°13′50″E
- Country: Germany
- State: Rhineland-Palatinate
- District: Ahrweiler
- Subdivisions: 5

Government
  - Mayor (2018–26): Björn Ingendahl (Greens)

Area
  - Total: 33.21 km^{2} (12.82 sq mi)
- Elevation: 60 m (200 ft)

Population (2025-12-31)
  - Total: 17,563
  - Density: 528.8/km^{2} (1,370/sq mi)
- Time zone: UTC+01:00 (CET)
  - Summer (DST): UTC+02:00 (CEST)
- Postal codes: 53424
- Dialling codes: 02642, 02228
- Vehicle registration: AW
- Website: www.remagen.de

Remagen (German pronunciation: [ˈʁeːmaːɡn̩]) is a town in Germany in the state of Rhineland-Palatinate, and district of Ahrweiler. It is about a one-hour drive from Cologne, just south of Bonn, the former West German seat of government, on the left (western) bank of the river Rhine. There is a ferry across the Rhine from Remagen every 10–15 minutes in the summer. Remagen has many notable and well-maintained buildings, churches, castles and monuments.

Overlooking the west bank of the Rhine just north of the city centre is the Apollinariskirche. It has an observation deck that is only open to parishioners on Sundays. Pedestrians reach the church via a dirt trail that passes a series of roadside monuments representing each of the fourteen Stations of the Cross. The church grounds contain an outdoor crypt and an abbey. Further down the river is one of the many castles along the Rhine, perched even higher than the Apollinariskirche.

== History ==
The Roman Empire built a border fort at Rigomagus (or Ricomagus), west of the Rhine. This was about 12 miles north of the site of the first bridge ever built across the Rhine (at Neuwied). This bridge fought the river current by being built on timbers which were driven into the bed at a slant. Caesar's troops spent nearly three weeks on the east side of the river, then crossed back over, destroying the bridge to prevent its use by German raiders. A second bridge was likewise destroyed by the builders once they were through with it.

The fort was one of a series built by Drusus, commander of the Roman army along the Rhine. Other Roman construction survived the centuries, including a gateway and Remagen became a tourist destination, popular with history buffs. Remagen appears on the 4th century Peutinger Map.

Local legend says that a ship carrying various relics from Milan to Cologne was stopped in the river in 1164, unable to move despite the strong current, until it mysteriously edged in toward the shore. The remains of Saint Apollinaris were put ashore, and the ship was then able to sail onward. These remains were interred in a chapel which had been part of the Roman fort, which became the basis for a church which bore his name, and was rebuilt several times over the years.

=== Bridge at Remagen ===
The Ludendorff Bridge was originally built during World War I as a means of moving troops and logistics west over the Rhine to reinforce the Western Front. The bridge was designed by Karl Wiener, an architect from Mannheim. It was 325 metres (1,066 ft) long, had a clearance of 14.8 metres (49 ft) above the normal water level of the Rhine, and its highest point measured 29.25 metres (96.0 ft). The bridge was designed to be defended by troops with towers on each bank with machine gun slits in the towers. The bridge carried two railway tracks and a pedestrian walkway. During World War II, one track was planked over to allow vehicular traffic.

=== Capture of the bridge ===
During Operation Lumberjack, on 7 March 1945, troops of the U.S. Army's 9th Armored Division reached the Ludendorff Bridge during the closing weeks of World War II and were very surprised to see that the railroad bridge was still standing. German defenders had failed to demolish it, leaving it the only one of the 22 road and railroad bridges over the Rhine still standing. U.S. forces were able to capture the bridge. The unexpected availability of the first major crossing of the Rhine, Germany's last major natural barrier and line of defense, caused Allied high commander Dwight Eisenhower to alter his plans to end the war and may have shortened the war in Europe.

The ability to quickly establish a bridgehead on the eastern side of the Rhine and to get forces into the bulk of Germany allowed the U.S. forces to envelop the German industrial area of the Ruhr more quickly than planned. The Allies were able to get six divisions across the bridge before it collapsed on 17 March 1945, ten days after it was captured. The collapse killed 18 U.S. Army Engineers. According to another source, a total of 28 U.S. engineers were killed and 93 were injured. However, a pontoon bridge had by then been built across the river and the main bridge was out of use for repairs at the time of its collapse.

A large number of books and articles in newspapers and magazines on the battle for the bridge have been published. The best-known work on the battle is 1957's The Bridge at Remagen by the American author Ken Hechler. In 1968 David L. Wolper produced an American motion picture, The Bridge at Remagen. The film depicts historical events, but is fictional in all other aspects.

=== Memorial ===
Remagen commemorative plaque.

Hans Peter Kürten, at that time (1968) Mayor of Remagen, had long considered the idea of constructing a memorial. The negotiations with the German Federal Railways alone lasted seven years before the city could finally acquire the former railway property. Announcements sent to government officials concerning the intended preservation of the bridge towers and the construction of a Memorial to Peace stirred no interest.

In the summer of 1976, it was necessary to remove the still intact bridge support pilings in the river. The mayor had the stones deposited on the Remagen river bank, with the idea in mind of selling small pieces of the bridge stones enclosed in synthetic resin and containing a certificate of authenticity.

On 7 March 1978, he went public with his idea and achieved such an unexpected degree of success, that he had realised more than 100,000 DM (around 50,000 EUR) in sales profits.

There has not been another bridge built across the Rhine here, mainly due to opposition from the people of Remagen (and surrounding areas), contending that a bridge located at this point along the Rhine would spoil the view.

=== Prisoner enclosures ===
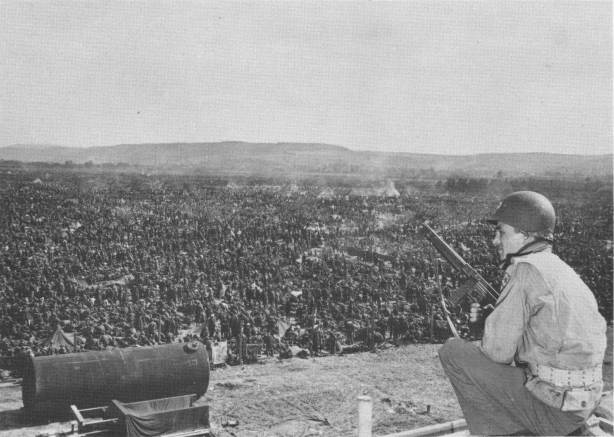
A U.S. soldier keeping guard over German soldiers, war-prisoners in Remagen

In 1945, the U.S. built one of the many enclosures on the west bank of the Rhine—the so-called Rheinwiesenlager—close to Remagen. The camps were used by the Allies to house captured German soldiers. Several thousand prisoners are estimated to have died in the various camps, including 1,212 who are now buried in the Bad Bodendorf Cemetery.

== Geography ==
=== City outline ===
Remagen is divided into six districts (Ortsbezirk) and eight localities (Ortsteile):

Urban structure of Remagen
District (Ortsbezirk)	Locality (Ortsteil)	residents
Remagen	Remagen	7.611
Kripp	Kripp	3.756
Oberwinter	Bandorf, Oberwinter, Rolandseck	3.712
Oedingen	Oedingen	1.034
Rolandswerth	Rolandswerth	588
Unkelbach	Unkelbach	1.143
Total city		17.844

residents (excluding secondary residences, June 30, 2020

The district of Kripp also belongs to the district of Remagen.

== Sites ==
=== Apollinariskirche ===
The Apollinaris Church was built 1839-1842 on the site of the medieval Church of St. Martin

=== Arp Museum housed in the Bahnhof Rolandseck ===
The historic railway station at Rolandseck about 5 km north of Remagen, now houses a museum devoted to the work of Hans Arp. The 19th century railway station - itself a classic example of early German railway architecture - was transformed into a cultural venue for all the arts in the 19th century. Johannes Brahms, Clara Schumann and Franz Liszt gave concerts there. George Bernard Shaw staged his plays there. The young poet Guillaume Apollinaire even fell in love there. Neglected, the building was listed for demolition after World War II, but in 1964 the Bonn art dealer Johannes Wasmuth brought it back to life. Musicians such as Martha Argerich, Stefan Askenase, and Yehudi Menuhin, artists such as Hans Arp, Oskar Kokoschka and Günther Uecker, and performers such as Marcel Marceau have all appeared there.

== People ==
- Henriette Jügel (1778-1850), painter
- Rudolf Caracciola (born 1901 in Remagen), racing driver
- Rudi Altig (1937-2016), cyclist
- Thomas Gottschalk (born 1950), German TV presenter, lived from 2006 to 2012 in the Marienfels Castle
- Franz Surges (1958-2015), composer and church musician
- Matthias Buchholz (born 1967), chef

== Transport links ==
Oberwinter station

Remagen station located at the Linke Rheinstrecke as well as the Ahr Valley Railway and served by the lines RE5 (Koblenz- Wesel), RB26 (Mainz - Cologne), RB30 (Bonn - Ahrbrück) and RB32 (Koblenz - Ahrbrück). Remagen is located in the transport association Verkehrsverbund Rhein-Mosel (VRM), zone number 817. Also the district Oberwinter has a train station at the Linke Rheinstrecke, which is served by RE5, RB26 and RB30.
