= 9th Armored Division (United States) =

- 9th Armored Division shoulder sleeve insignia
- Active: 15 July 1942 – 13 October 1945
- Country: United States
- Branch: United States Army
- Type: Armor
- Role: Armored warfare
- Size: Division
- Nickname: "Phantom"
- Engagements: World War II; Rhineland; Ardennes-Alsace; Central Europe

Commanders
- Notable commanders: Geoffrey Keyes, John W. Leonard, Thomas L. Harrold

Insignia
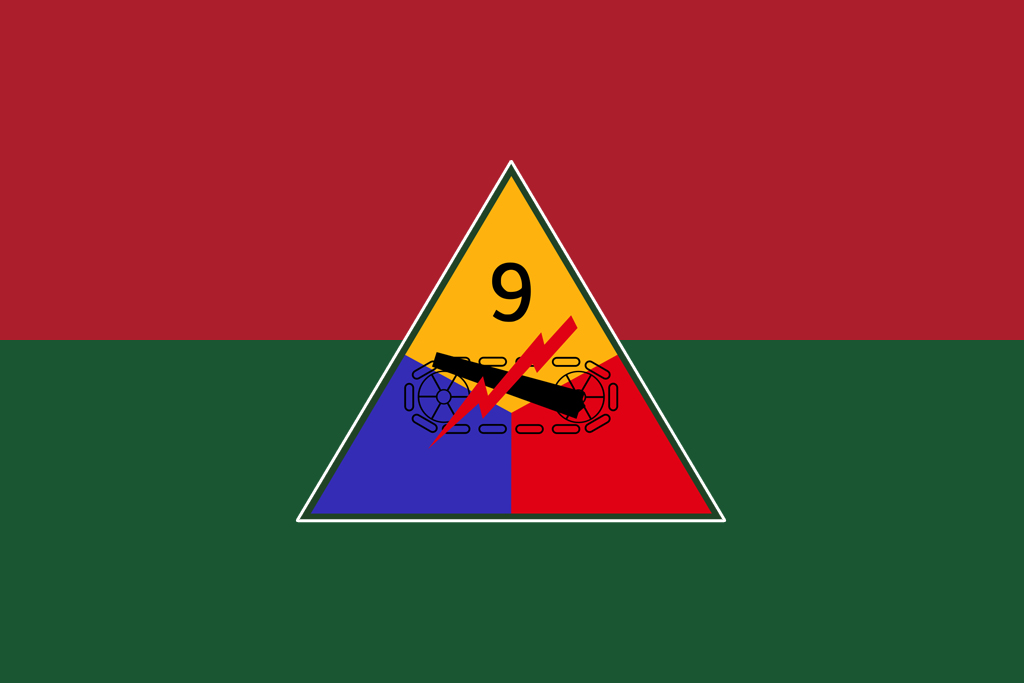
- Flag of the United States Army 9th Armored Division

The 9th Armored Division (the "Phantom Division") was a light armored division of the United States Army during World War II. In honor of their World War II service, the 9th was officially nicknamed the "Phantom Division."

The 9th Armored Division was cited for combat in the vicinity of Waldbillig and Savelborn, Luxembourg, from 16 to 22 December 1944, during which it repulsed attacks by a German division. Outnumbered five to one, with its infantry rifle companies surrounded for most of the period, clerks, cooks, mechanics, drivers, and others manned the 10,000 yards (9,100 m) defensive line. Supported by the fire of its artillery battalion, the force stopped attacks for six days until its surrounded infantry were ordered to fight their way back. This defense altered the German attack schedule and gave time for the United States III and XII Corps to assemble and launch a coordinated attack that raised the siege of Bastogne and prevented another German invasion of Luxembourg and its capital. They were awarded the Presidential Unit Citation.

== History ==
=== Predecessor units and early history ===
The 3rd Cavalry Brigade, 15th Cavalry Division was constituted in the Regular Army on 29 August 1917 and was organized in December 1917 at Camp Harry J. Jones, Arizona. It was demobilized on 15 July 1919. Because of a reduced table of organization for the cavalry division developed after the war, the 3rd Cavalry Brigade became a part of the new 2nd Cavalry Division. On 15 July 1942, the 9th Armored Division, under the command of Major General Geoffrey Keyes, was activated at Fort Riley, Kansas, by reorganizing and redesignating the white elements of the 2nd Cavalry Division. This was only seven months after the Japanese attack on Pearl Harbor on 7 December 1941, which was followed just four days later by the German declaration of war on the United States, thus bringing the United States into World War II. Headquarters, 3rd Cavalry Brigade was converted, reorganized, and redesignated as Headquarters, 9th Armored Division Train. The 2nd and 14th Cavalry Regiments were inactivated and the personnel and equipment were transferred to the new 2nd and 14th Armored Regiments, respectively.

The regiments underwent changes during the war as follows:

- 2nd Armored Regiment reorganized and redesignated 9 October 1943:
  - Headquarters, Headquarters Company, and 2nd Battalion reorganized and redesignated as 2nd Tank Battalion, 9th Armored Division.
  - 1st Battalion reorganized and redesignated as 776th Tank Battalion and relieved from assignment to the 9th Armored Division.
  - 3rd Battalion reorganized and redesignated as 19th Tank Battalion, 9th Armored Division.
  - Reconnaissance Company reorganized and redesignated as Troop D, 89th Cavalry Reconnaissance Squadron, 9th Armored Division.
  - Band, Maintenance Company, and Service Company disbanded.
- 14th Armored Regiment reorganized and redesignated 9 October 1943:
  - Headquarters, Headquarters Company, and 1st and 2nd Battalions reorganized and redesignated as 14th Tank Battalion, 9th Armored Division.
  - 3rd Battalion reorganized and redesignated as 711th Tank Battalion and relieved from assignment to the 9th Armored Division.
  - Reconnaissance Company reorganized and redesignated as Troop E, 89th Cavalry Reconnaissance Squadron, 9th Armored Division.
  - Band, Maintenance Company, and Service Company disbanded.

The lineages of the 2nd and 14th Cavalry Regiments were continued when these inactive units, having given up their personnel and equipment, were later reorganized and redesignated as cavalry reconnaissance squadrons and reactivated in 1943.

After its formation, the 9th AD was sent to Camp Ibis in California from June to October of 1943 for combat training. It was then sent to Camp Polk, Louisiana for maneuvers and then finally to New York for embarkation to England on the RMS Queen Mary.

After over two years of training, the 9th Armored Division, now commanded by Major General John W. Leonard (the former deputy commander), reached the United Kingdom in September 1944.

=== Fortitude ===
The 9th Armored Division was one of several serving U.S. Army divisions that participated in Operation Fortitude, the deception operation mounted by the Allies to deceive the Germans about the real landing site for Operation Neptune, the amphibious invasion of Northern France. The 9th was assigned to a camp on the British coastline opposite of the German defenses in Pas-de-Calais, ostensibly as part of the "First US Army Group" (FUSAG) under Major General John W. Leonard.

=== Combat chronicle ===
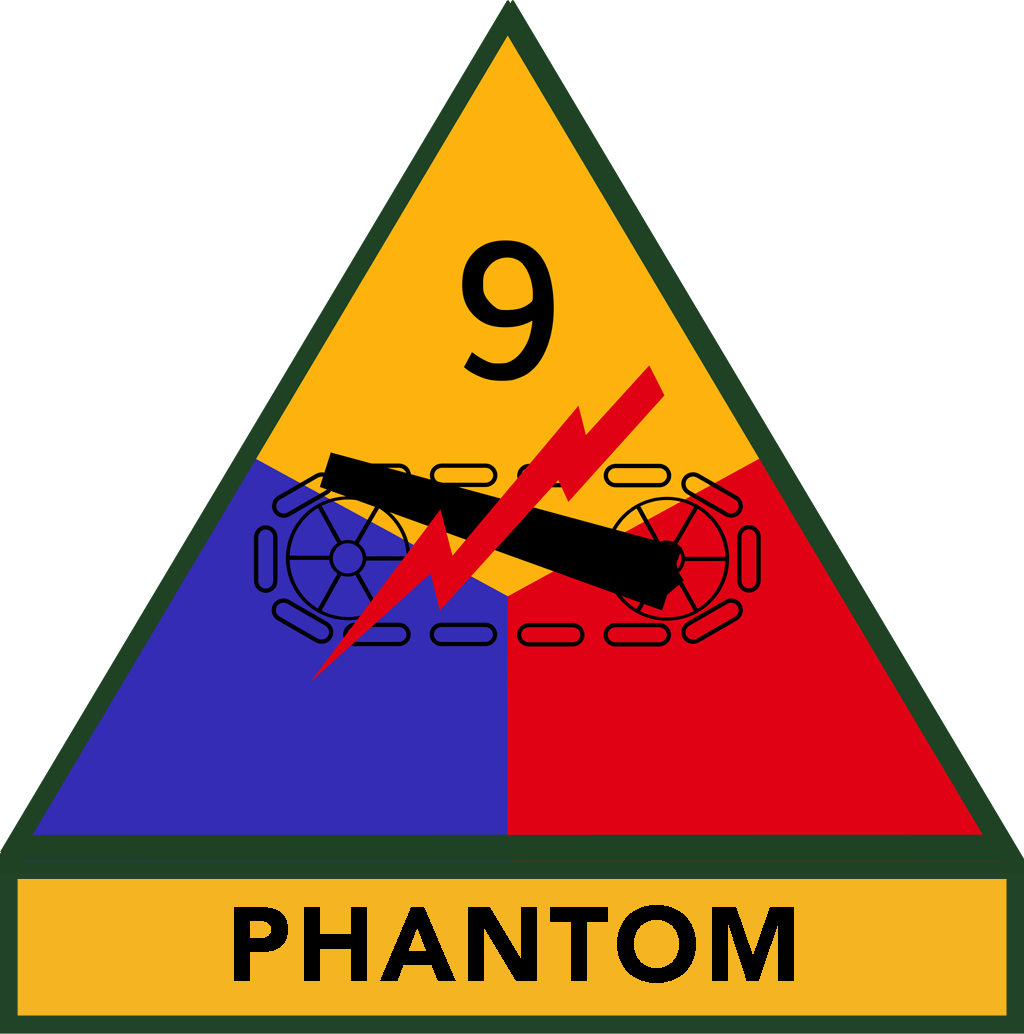
9th Armored Division "Phantom" Division

The 9th Armored Division landed in Normandy late in September 1944, and first went into line, 23 October 1944, on patrol duty in a quiet sector along the Luxembourg-German frontier. When the Germans launched their winter offensive on 16 December 1944, the 9th AD, with no real combat experience, suddenly found itself engaged in heavy fighting. The Division saw its severest action at St. Vith, Echternach, and Bastogne, its units fighting in widely separated areas.

Its stand at Bastogne held off the Germans for 36 hours, long enough to enable the 101st Airborne Division to dig in for a defense of the city. After a rest period in January 1945, the Division prepared to drive across the Roer River. The offensive was launched on 28 February 1945 and the 9th crossed the Roer to Rheinbach, sending patrols into Remagen.

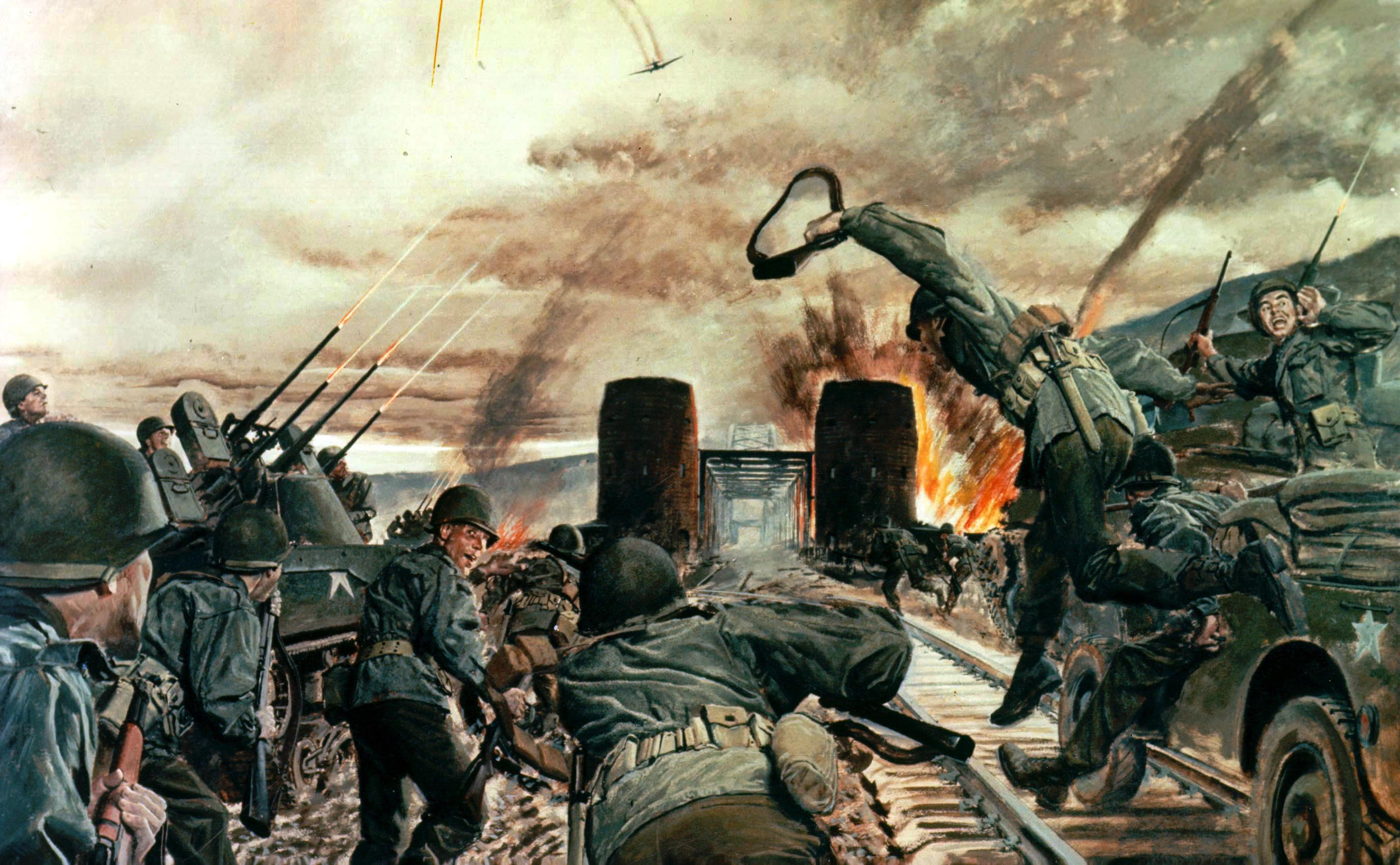
Illustration of the capture of the bridge.

"Here, on the Ludendorf Bridge crossing the Rhine at Remagen, Combat Command B, 9th Armored Division -- headed by the 27th Armored Infantry Battalion -- with 'superb skill, daring and esprit de corps' successfully effected the first bridgehead across Germany's formidable river barrier and so contributed decisively to the defeat of the enemy. The 27th Battalion reached Remagen, found the bridge intact but mined for demolition. Although its destruction was imminent, without hesitation and in face of heavy fire the infantrymen rushed across the structure, and with energy and skill seized the surrounding high ground. The entire episode illustrates that high degree of initiative, leadership and gallantry toward which all armies strive but too rarely attain, and won for the Combat Command the Distinguished Unit Citation."

On 7 March 1945, elements of the 9th Armored captured the Ludendorff Bridge when German demolition charges failed to bring the bridge down. Soldiers scrambled under the bridge, swinging from girder to girder, tossing demolition charges into the Rhine, fearing the chargers could explode at any time. Capturing the bridge may have shortened the war by weeks to months and saved tens of thousands of lives.

It would be during this time that the Germans named the 9th Armored "Phantom Division" due to it being seemingly everywhere (three locations).

The Division exploited the bridgehead, moving south and east across the Lahn River toward Limburg, where thousands of Allied prisoners were liberated from Stalag XIIA. The Division drove on to Frankfurt and then turned to assist in the closing of the Ruhr Pocket. In April it continued east, encircling Leipzig and securing a line along the Mulde River. The Division was shifting south to Czechoslovakia and liberated the Zwodau concentration camp on May 7, 1945. The division was given the designation at "Liberators" in 1993.

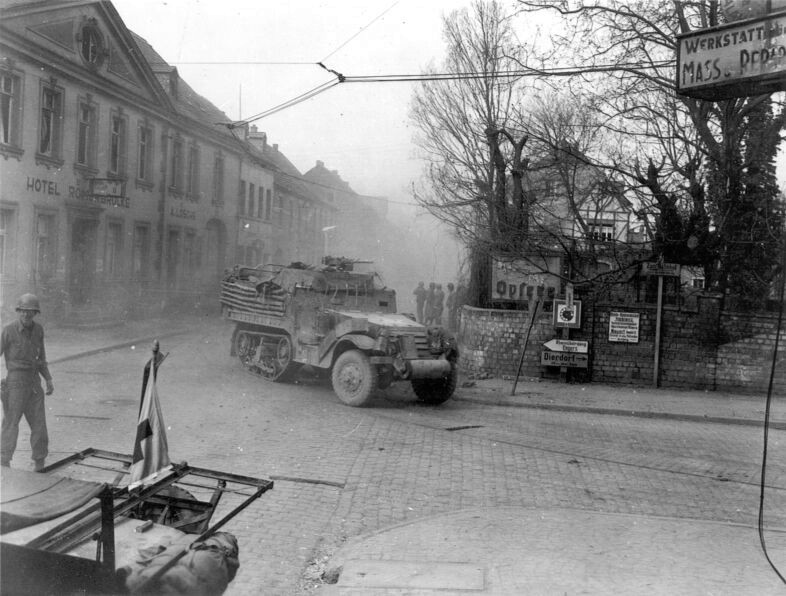
9th AID M3 Half-tracks advancing through Engers, Germany, 27 March 1945.

U.S. Army personnel cross the Ludendorff Bridge

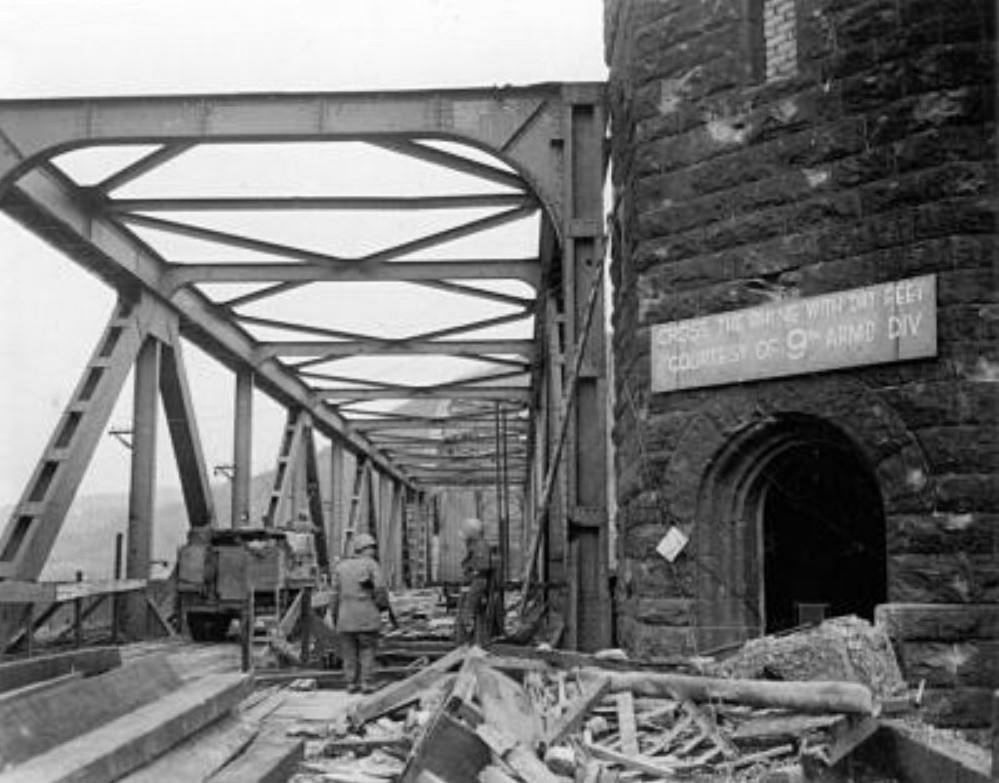
"CROSS THE RHINE WITH DRY FEET COURTESY OF 9TH ARM'D DIV".

=== Combat statistics ===
- Activated: 15 July 1942.
- Overseas: 26 August 1944.
- Campaigns: Rhineland, Ardennes-Alsace, Central Europe.
- Days of Combat: 91.
- Returned to U.S.: 10 October 1945.
- Inactivated: 13 October 1945.

=== Commanders ===
- Maj. Gen. Geoffrey Keyes (June to September 1942)
- Maj. Gen. John W. Leonard (October 1942 to inactivation).

=== Casualties ===
- Total battle casualties: 3,845
- Killed in action: 570
- Wounded in action: 2,280
- Missing in action: 87
- Prisoner of war: 908

=== Individual awards for valor ===
- Medal of Honor: 1
- Distinguished Service Cross: 1
- Distinguished Service Medal: 2
- Silver Star: 191
- Legion of Merit: 13
- Soldier's Medal: 11
- Bronze Star: 1,263
- Air Medal: 28

=== Unit awards ===
- Distinguished Unit Citations: 11
- All units of CCB/9 AIB of the 9th Armored Division were awarded the Presidential Unit Citation for their actions in taking and defending the Ludendorff Bridge during the Battle of Remagen in World War II.

Combat Command B, 9th Armored Division is cited for outstanding performance of duty in action from 28 February to 9 March 1945 in Germany. On 28 February, Combat Command B launched an attack from the vicinity of Soller and less than twenty-four hours later crossed the Erft River at Derkum, forcing the enemy into disorderly retreat, the unit headed south-east, reaching the heights west of Remagen on 7 March, where troops of the command could see the Ludendorff Bridge across the Rhine River with large numbers of German troops fleeing across it. At 1500 hours that day a prisoner was captured who revealed that the bridge was mined for demolition and was to be destroyed at 1600 hours. At 1535 hours, one column of Combat Company B reached the western approach to the bridge. The span was still intact. Although the destruction of the bridge was imminent, American troops unhesitatingly rushed across the structure in the face of intense enemy automatic weapons fire. An explosion rocked the bridge but did not destroy it. Engineers scrambled down the abutments, cutting wires leading to other demolition charges and disposing of hundreds of pounds of explosives by hurling them into the river. Bulldozer tanks, working under heavy artillery and small-arms fire, filled craters at the bridge approach to permit vehicular passage. Upon reaching the opposite bank, troops of Combat Command B fought gallantly and cleared the surrounding high ground. Although the strength of the span was unknown, tank units rumbled across the bridge after dark and lent their support to foot troops. Antiaircraft artillery men deployed their weapons so skillfully that in the ensuing days numerous enemy airplanes were destroyed in vain attempts to destroy the bridge. The superb skill, daring and esprit de corps displayed by each officer and man of Combat Command B, 9th Armored Division, in the dash to the Rhine, the capture of the Ludendorff Bridge, and the successful exploitation of this first bridgehead across Germany's formidable river barrier made an outstanding contribution to the defeat of the enemy.

=== Division organization ===
==== Heavy armored division ====
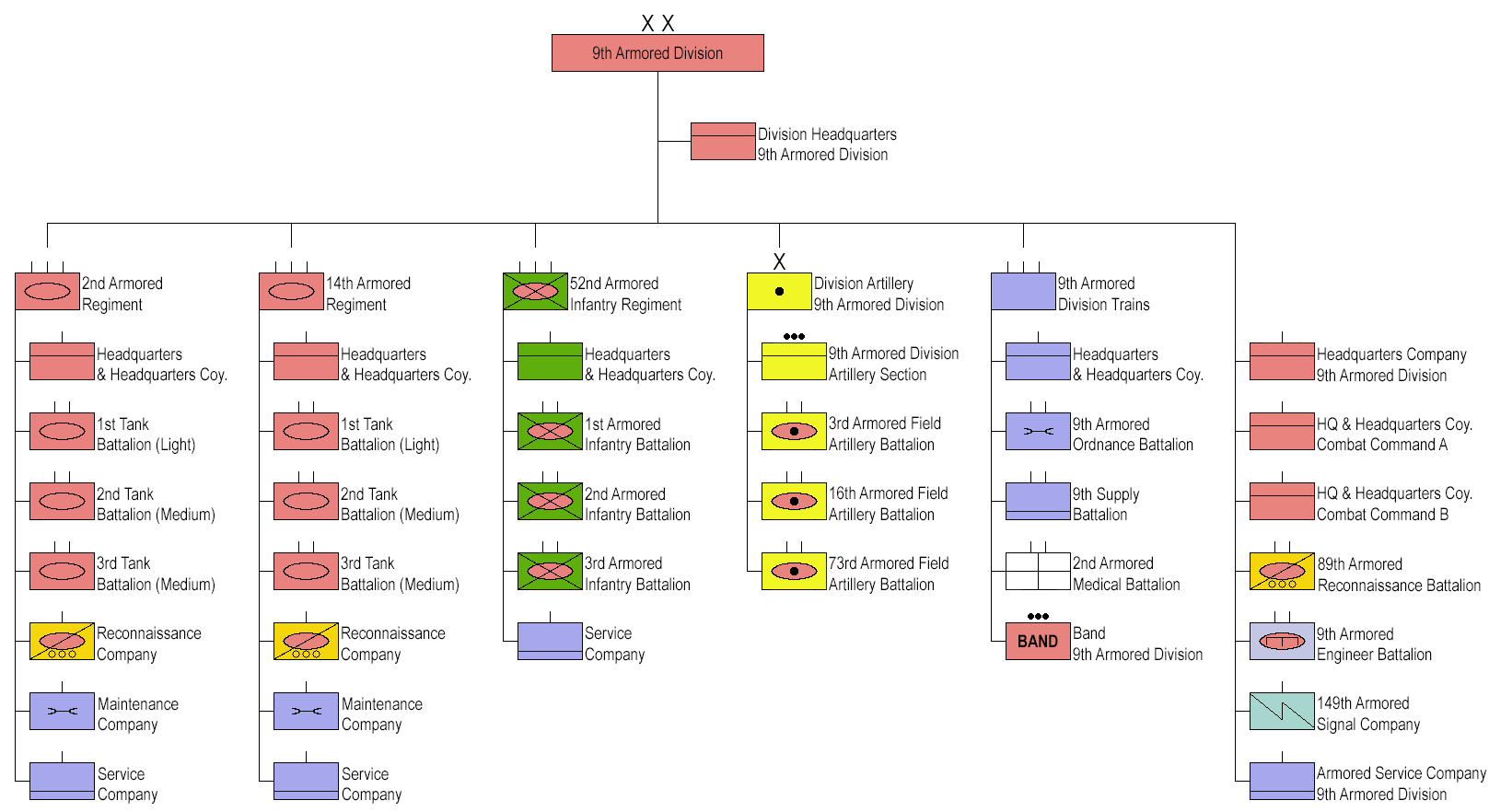
9th Armored Division organization after the division's activation (click to enlarge)

The division was activated as a heavy armored division in the Army of the United States in 1942. At the time the 9th Armored Division was composed of the following units:

- 9th Armored Division
  - Division Headquarters
  - Headquarters Company, 9th Armored Division
  - Headquarters and Headquarters Company, Combat Command A
  - Headquarters and Headquarters Company, Combat Command B
  - 149th Armored Signal Company
  - Armored Service Company (includes the division's Military Police Platoon)
  - 2nd Armored Regiment
    - Headquarters and Headquarters Company
    - Reconnaissance Company (M3 scout cars and T30 HMC self propelled guns)
    - Maintenance Company
    - Service Company
    - 1st Tank Battalion (Light)
      - Headquarters and Headquarters Company
      - 3× Light Tank companies (A, B, C) (M3/M5 Stuart light tanks)
    - 2nd Tank Battalion (Medium)
      - Headquarters and Headquarters Company
      - 3× Medium Tank companies (D, E, F) (M4 Sherman tanks)
    - 3rd Tank Battalion (Medium)
      - Headquarters and Headquarters Company
      - 3× Medium Tank companies (G, H, I) (M4 Sherman tanks)
  - 14th Armored Regiment
    - same organization as 2nd Armored Regiment
  - 52nd Armored Infantry Regiment
    - Headquarters and Headquarters Company
    - 3× Armored infantry battalions
      - each battalion consists of: 1× Headquarters and Headquarters Company, 3× Rifle companies on M3 half-tracks
    - Service Company
  - 89th Armored Reconnaissance Battalion
    - Headquarters and Headquarters Company
    - 3× Reconnaissance companies (M3 scout cars)
    - Light Tank Company (M3/M5 Stuart light tanks)
  - 9th Armored Engineer Battalion
    - Headquarters and Headquarters Company
    - 4× Armored engineer companies
    - Bridge Company
  - 9th Armored Division Artillery
    - 9th Armored Division Artillery Section
    - 3rd Armored Field Artillery Battalion
      - Headquarters and Headquarters Battery
      - 3× Field artillery batteries (M7 Priest self propelled howitzers)
      - Service Battery
    - 16th Armored Field Artillery Battalion
      - same organization as 3rd Armored Field Artillery Battalion
    - 73rd Armored Field Artillery Battalion
      - same organization as 3rd Armored Field Artillery Battalion
  - 9th Armored Division Trains
    - Headquarters and Headquarters Company
    - 14th Armored Ordnance Battalion
      - Headquarters and Headquarters Company
      - 3× Maintenance companies
    - 14th Supply Battalion
      - Headquarters and Headquarters Company
      - 2× Truck companies
    - 2nd Armored Medical Battalion
      - Headquarters and Headquarters Company
      - 3× Medical companies
    - 9th Armored Division Band

==== Light armored division ====
Early in 1943, the Army Ground Force began a series of studies to reorganize the various divisions within the Army. After reviewing the tables of organization and after allowing the various commands to review and comment on the proposed restructure, the War Department published on 15 September 1943 a new armored division tables of organization. The restructuring removed the two armored regiments and armored infantry regiment from the table of organization and replaced them with three tank battalions and three armored infantry battalions. Each tank battalion included one light and three medium tank companies. Both Combat Commands, A and B, remained, but an additional Reserve Command was added to the organization. This was a small headquarters element of 10 personnel tasked to clarify command and control in the division's rear area. Armored engineer battalions lost their bridge companies, while their engineer companies were reduced from four to three. The division's cavalry reconnaissance squadron was increased in size to include an HQ Troop, four reconnaissance troops, a light tank company, and an assault gun troop of four platoons (one for each reconnaissance troop). Within the division trains, the division lost its supply battalion and the division's armored service company. These changes pared the division's strength from 14,630 men to 10,937, slashed the number of tanks from 360 to 263, reduced the variety of vehicles to ease repair problems, and eliminated the maintenance-prone motorcycles.

After its reorganization as a light armored division the 9th Armored Division was composed of the following units:

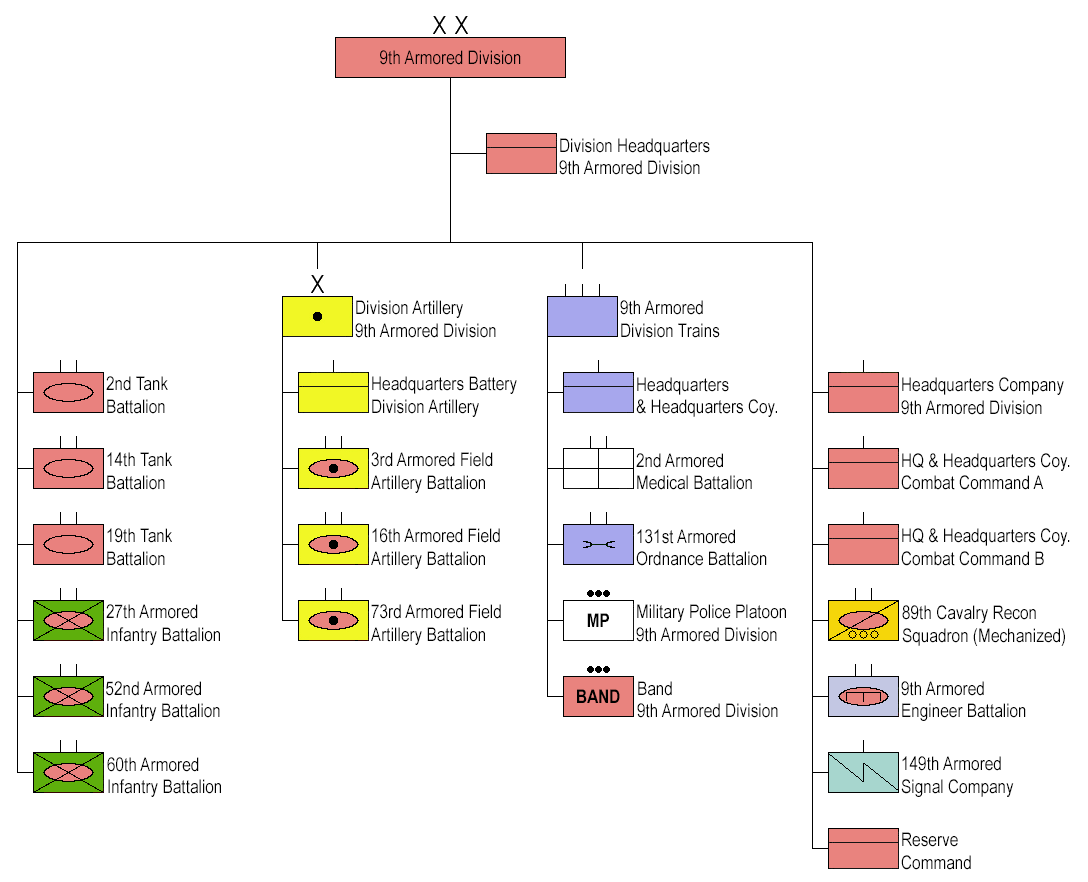
9th Armored Division organization after the division's reorganization (click to enlarge)

- 9th Armored Division
  - Division Headquarters
  - Headquarters Company, 9th Armored Division
  - Headquarters and Headquarters Company, Combat Command A
  - Headquarters and Headquarters Company, Combat Command B
  - 149th Armored Signal Company
  - Reserve Command
  - 2nd Tank Battalion
    - Headquarters and Headquarters Company
    - 3× Medium Tank companies (M4 Sherman tanks)
    - Light Tank Company (M3/M5 Stuart or M24 Chaffee light tanks)
    - Service Company
  - 14th Tank Battalion
    - same organization as 2nd Tank Battalion
  - 19th Tank Battalion
    - same organization as 2nd Tank Battalion
  - 27th Armored Infantry Battalion
    - Headquarters and Headquarters Company
    - 3× Rifle companies (M3 half-tracks)
    - Service Company
  - 52nd Armored Infantry Battalion
    - same organization as 27th Armored Infantry Battalion
  - 60th Armored Infantry Battalion
    - same organization as 27th Armored Infantry Battalion
  - 89th Cavalry Reconnaissance Squadron (Mechanized)
    - Headquarters and Headquarters and Service Troop
    - 4× Cavalry reconnaissance troops (M8 Greyhound armored cars)
    - Cavalry Assault Gun Troop (M8 Scott self propelled guns)
    - Light Tank Company (M3/M5 Stuart or M24 Chaffee light tanks)
  - 9th Armored Engineer Battalion
    - Headquarters and Headquarters Company
    - 3× Armored engineer companies
  - 9th Armored Division Artillery
    - Headquarters and Headquarters Battery
    - 3rd Armored Field Artillery Battalion
      - Headquarters and Headquarters Battery
      - 3× Field artillery batteries (M7 Priest self propelled howitzers)
      - Service Battery
    - 16th Armored Field Artillery Battalion
      - same organization as 3rd Armored Field Artillery Battalion
    - 73rd Armored Field Artillery Battalion
      - same organization as 3rd Armored Field Artillery Battalion
  - 9th Armored Division Trains
    - Headquarters and Headquarters Company
    - 2nd Armored Medical Battalion
      - Headquarters and Headquarters Company
      - 3× Medical companies
    - 131st Armored Ordnance Battalion
      - Headquarters and Headquarters Company
      - 3× Maintenance companies
    - Military Police Platoon
    - 9th Armored Division Band

Attached units:

- 656th Tank Destroyer Battalion (attached 22 February 1945 past 9 May 1945)
- 811th Tank Destroyer Battalion (attached 14 November 1944 to 8 January 1945)
- 482nd AAA Automatic Weapons Battalion (attached 22 November 1944 to 9 January 1945; 22 February 1945 to 9 May 1945)

== In popular media ==
In 1965 United Artists released the film The Bridge at Remagen starring George Segal based on the book The Bridge at Remagen: The Amazing Story of March 7, 1945 by Ken Hechler a 9th Armored Division veteran.

== Inactivation ==
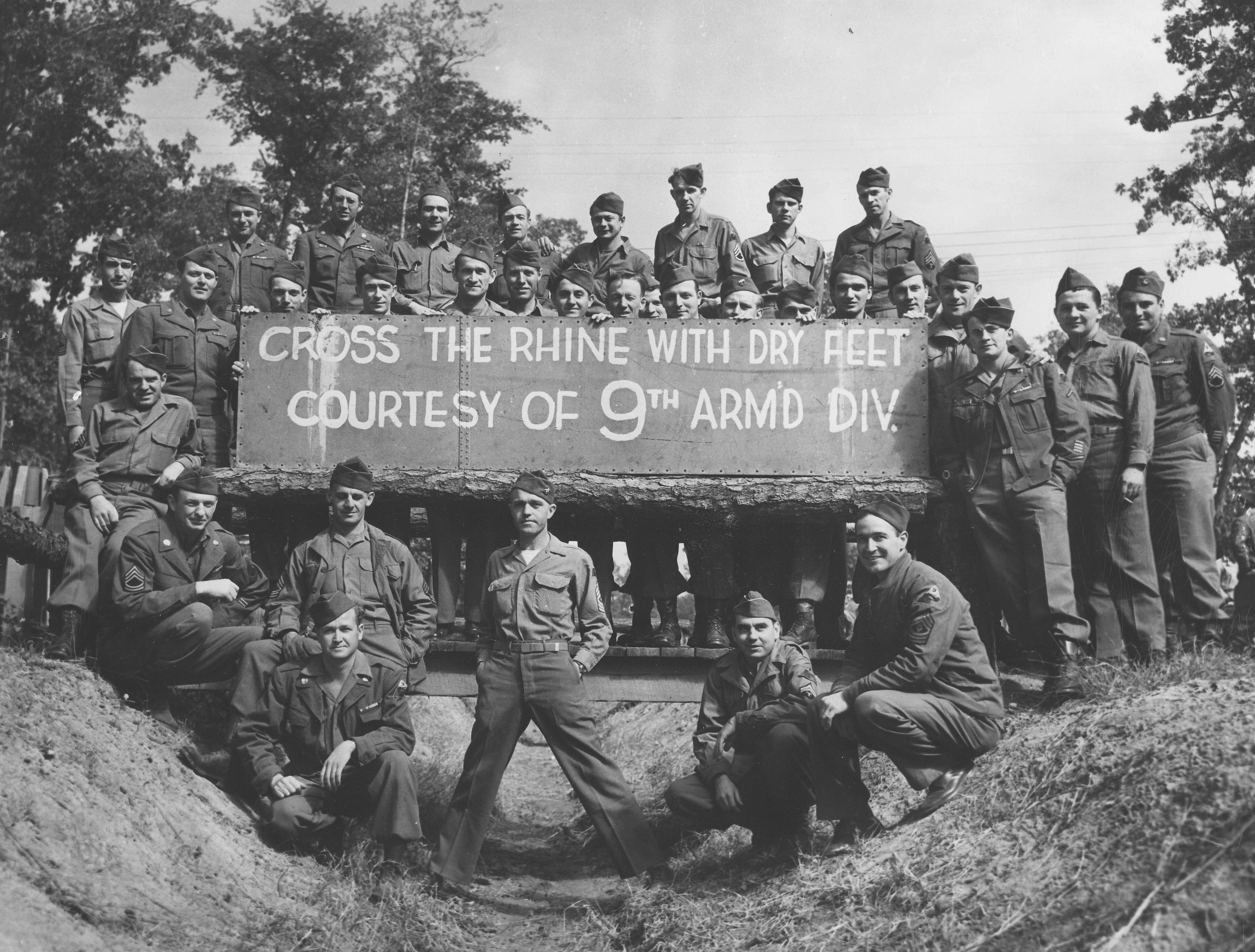
On 13 October 1945, the 9th Armored Division was inactivated in Newport News, Virginia. On that day, members of the division pose with the original sign they posted on the Ludendorff Bridge on 8 March 1945 after it was unexpectedly captured intact, opening a bridgehead into Germany three weeks earlier than planned.

After World War II, the unit returned to Camp Patrick Henry in Virginia and inactivated on 13 October 1945, and reactivated on 15 July 1963, when it was reassigned from the 9th Armored Division, and converted and redesignated as HHC, 3rd Brigade, 1st Cavalry Division (United States).
