= Pebble Creek (Elkhorn River tributary) =

Stream in Nebraska, U.S.

Coordinates: 41.6444436°N 96.6305836°W

Pebble Creek is a stream in Stanton, Dodge, and Cuming counties, Nebraska, in the United States. It is a tributary of the Elkhorn River.

Pebble Creek was so named from the abundance of pebbles at a ford where soldiers crossed in the 1849 Pawnee War.

== See also ==
- List of rivers of Nebraska
