= Table of organization and equipment =

Specified structure and equipment of a unit

A table of organization and equipment (TOE or TO&E) is an originally U.S. Army term for the specified organization, staffing, and equipment of military units. The British Army often used the term "establishment," including the War Establishment, after mobilization. Also used in acronyms as 'T/O' and 'T/E'. It also provides information on the mission and capabilities of a unit as well as the unit's current status.

The term was created when the War Department was preparing the Tables of Organisation and Tables of Equipment for 1943. In the process the two types of organisation documents were merged, creating TOEs.

A general TOE is applicable to a type of unit (for instance, an infantry battalion) rather than a specific unit (the 2nd Battalion, 4th Infantry Regiment). Sometimes, all units of the same branch (such as Infantry) follow the same structural guidelines; much more often, there are a wide variety of TOEs to suit specific circumstances (Modified Tables of Organization and Equipment (MTOEs), in the United States Army, for example).

== Soviet Union and Russia ==
FM100-2-3 - The Soviet Army, Troops, Organization, and Equipment; this document contains a number of simplified Tables of Organization and Equipment

In the Soviet and the Russian Armed Forces the term used for TO&E since the 1930s is "Shtatnoe raspisanie" (Штатное расписание literally translated as Shtat Prescription). It originates from the term "Shtat" (ru:штат) which literally means "assignment" and in a secondary meaning as the synonym for TO&E itself. Note that in the Soviet Union and modern day Russia the term "Shtatnoe raspisanie" applied not only to military units, but also to state organizations such as ministries, agencies, universities, hospitals etc. and even to the corporate structure of private companies.

At the beginning of the 18th century, during the reforms of Peter I, regiments and other military structures of the Russian Army and Navy began to be organized in accordance with such Shtats. Many of the Red Army's rifle divisions at the beginning of Operation Barbarossa were operating on Shtat 04/400 of 5 April 1941. This Shtat stipulated that an infantry division should consist of three infantry regiments, a light and a howitzer artillery regiment, other artillery units, a reconnaissance battalion, a combat engineer battalion, signals, chemical company (decontamination/flamethrower), transport, medical, and logistics train units, an aviation flight, and a division staff seemingly consisting of the division commander (1/0/0), division staff (70, including 12 horses and 13 vehicles), a quartermaster section of five officers (5/0/0), a military tribunal (military justice) of two officers, and a political section of 11 officers.

Other early war Rifle formation shtats included:

- Rifle Division (Shtat 04/600 of 29.07.41)
- Rifle Division (Shtat 04/750 of 06.12.41)
- Mountain Rifle Division (Shtat 04/140 of 15.08.1940)
- Independent Rifle Brigade (Shtat 04/730 of 15.10.41)

The first iteration of the Red Army's tank divisions, as part of the Mechanised Corps which began to form in the late 1930s, were in 1940 organized under Shtat 010/10; their tank regiments under 010/16; and their mechanised regiments under 010/15. The Mechanised Corps Headquarters was organised in accordance with Shtat 010/20. The motorized divisions of the corps were organized by Shtat 05/70, Division Headquarters; Shtat 05/71, Motorized Rifle Regiment, Shtat 05/72 Artillery Regiment and Shtat 05/73, Tank Regiment.

Soviet rifle divisions were often forced to operate at far below their authorised strengths. For example, in the middle of the fighting on the Eastern Front, on July 20, 1942, a report on the 284th Rifle Division lamented:

In the division there are 3,172 military servicemen; a batch of replacements numbering 1,312 men has arrived and another 2,000... are expected, but in the division there are only a total of 1,921 rifles, 98 [semi-]automatic rifles and 202 PPSh submachine guns... There are 21 motorized vehicles in the division, but according to the shtat there should be 114. There are just 7 heavy machine guns, but according to the shtat 108 are necessary. 47 light machine guns, but according to the shtat there should be 350. 36 anti-tank rifles, but 277 according to the shtat. The division's separation from its supply base extends up to 100 kilometres and aggravates the supply [of] food.

The commissar, Tkachenko, went on to urgently request vehicles (including ambulances, of which there were none), small arms and support weapons, draught horses, and a closer supply base. After the first day of fighting he further reported that the lack of high-explosive shells forced the artillery to fire armor-piercing rounds at enemy firing points and troops; there were no cartridges for the submachine guns; many of the men's uniforms and footwear were worn out; and it was impossible to commit the replacements into the fighting because of the lack of weapons.

The actual personnel (field ration) strength of Red Army units and formations during the first 30 months of the Second World War seldom if ever met the specified shtat totals. Manpower shortages were routine if not endemic. When Operation Barbarossa began, the average strength of divisions facing the Germans was about 67%; with enormous variations, the average totals began to rise before offensives as Stavka refilled the divisions in advance of operations, and then formations were ground down in battle. Several instances of divisions continuing to operate with only hundreds of men are recorded. On main attack axes in mid-1943, average personnel strengths reached 75-80% of the required shtat.

In the late 1950s the Soviet Ground Forces began forming motor rifle divisions. By Directive of the Commander of the Troops of the Belorussian Military District No. 03/0065 of 19 April 1957, the 55th Guards Rifle Division was reorganized into the 55th Guards Motorized Rifle Division Shtat No. 5/730-5/745. As of December 1, 1962, the division was organised under Shtat No. 5/220 and its motor rifle regiments under Shtat No. 5/221, while its artillery regiment was organised in accordance with Shtat No. 5/225. No. 5/223 appears to have covered independent tank battalions of motor rifle divisions.

Ground Forces formations were held at a series of descending levels of strength, ("A," "Б," "В," "Г,") corresponding to the first four letters of the Russian Cyrillic alphabet. The reason for the creation of reduced-strength (cadre) units and formations in the Soviet Armed Forces was the need to reduce strength while simultaneously maintaining officer personnel, stocks of military equipment, weapons and materiel.

For example, in the 191st Motor Rifle Regiment of the "framed" (reduced-strength) 201st Motor Rifle Division at the beginning of December 1979, there were 12 (twelve) people (the regiment was held at a state “G” strength). In connection with the deployment of the regiment to Afghanistan, in January 1980, the regiment's personnel were quickly increased to 2,200 people.

== United States ==
=== Army ===
In the U.S. Army, there are four basic types of TOEs:

- The Base Table of Organization and Equipment (BTOE)
  - An organizational design document based on current doctrine and available equipment. It shows the basics of a unit's structure and their wartime requirements (both for personnel and equipment).
- The Objective Table of Organization and Equipment (OTOE)
  - An updated form of the BTOE, usually formed within the last year. It is a fully modern document and is up to date with current policies and initiatives.
- A Modified Table of Organization and Equipment (MTOE)
  - A document that modifies a BTOE in regard to a specific unit. Used when a unit's needs are substantially different from the BTOE. For example, the headquarters of the 194th Engineer Brigade was organized under MTOE 5-111GNG01 with authorized strength of 31 Officers, 4 Warrant Officers, and 86 Enlisted pursuant to GO 60, Military Department of Tennessee, dated 15 October 1973.
- A Table of Distribution and Allowances (TDA)
  - A type of temporary TOE that is applicable to a specific mission. Used in an instance when there is no applicable TOE.

Each TOE has a unique number that identifies it. When changes are needed, a table is not modified, instead, a new table is drafted from scratch.

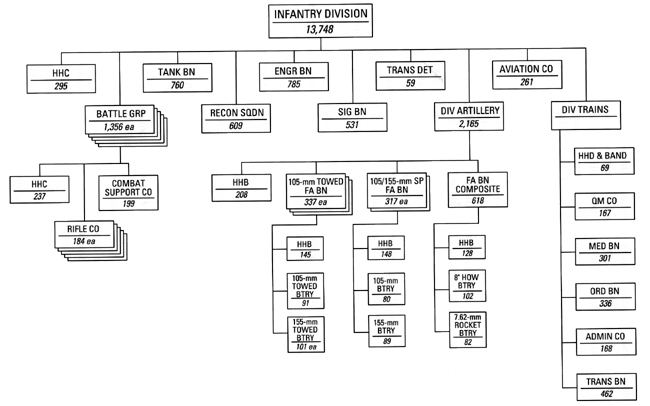
A table of organization (T/O) for the Pentomic Infantry Division as of 1 February 1960. It does not include equipment.

An example of an overall T/O change can be seen when the "Pentomic" organization was superseded by the Reorganization Objective Army Division (ROAD). During the 1950s, the Pentomic reorganization shifted the basic tactical unit from the regiment to the five-company battle group. Instead of brigades, an armored division had three Combat Commands designated: CCA, CCB, and CCC.

On 16 December 1960, the Army Chief of Staff directed a reappraisal of division organization. Resulting studies were carried out between January and April 1961, and fully implemented by 1965. The resulting Reorganization of Army Divisions (ROAD) changed all division types (Mechanized, Airborne, Armor, Infantry and Cavalry) to an identical structure of three brigades of three (sometimes four) battalions. ROAD divisions consisted of a mix of nine to twelve armour and infantry battalions based on its Mission, the likely Enemy, the Terrain/weather, and other forces available or Troops. Each brigade would be assigned or attached the mix of battalions and companies based on the division commanders estimate based on METT. As operations continued, the division commander could task organize subordinate units as needed by the flow of the battle.

ROAD was superseded by the Army of Excellence Reorganization of the 1980s. One of the later iterations to that process was the creation of "Light Infantry" divisions, which eventually numbered four: the 6th Infantry; 7th Infantry; 10th Mountain Division (Light Infantry); and the 29th Infantry Division in the Virginia and Maryland Army National Guards. Force XXI in the 1990s "digitized" the Army of Excellence structure. The design for the FORCE XXI interim division was slightly smaller than the Army of Excellence division, totaling 15,820 personnel. Modifications included increased fire support to shape battle space, and additional reconnaissance. Designating the 2nd Armored Division, reflagged as the 4th Infantry Division, as a test division adversely impacted on its combat readiness. Although only the 1st Brigade was involved in the National Training Centre AWE, the division's other units were involved in helping the brigade prepare for it.

In 2003, the Army began a set of ambitious changes to address the stresses imposed on the force by the War in Afghanistan (2001-2021) and the Iraq War (U.S. phase, 2003-2010). The first involved refocusing the Army upon brigades, the “modularity” concept, rather than upon maneoeuvre divisions. At the same time, the "Grow the Army" programme increased the Army's personnel total ("end strength"). This would allow more formations to be established. Some combat service support forces were also moved from the Army National Guard and Army Reserve to the Active Component.

Table of Distribution and Allowances (TDA) units are not intended for combat in the field. They are usually non-deployable.

=== Marine Corps ===
United States Marine Corps T/O&Es are based on a generic template for each specific type and size of unit, for example, a weapons company of an infantry battalion, or a heavy helicopter squadron. These templates are then modified as needed by the individual unit. The Marine Corps also relies on other documents to report what personnel and equipment a unit actually possesses.

The T/O section denotes every authorized billet within a unit by rank and Military Occupational Specialty required to fulfill the necessary duties. The T/E section denotes authorized equipment by Line Item Number and quantity.

== See also ==
- Military organization
- Military doctrine
- Order of battle

== External links and sources ==
- U.S. Army TOE
- TRADOC Regulation 71-15
- What is a TOE (WWII example)
- Andrew Fieckert, The 2024 Army Force Structure Transformation Initiative, 2 May 2025
