= 9th Engineer Battalion (United States) =

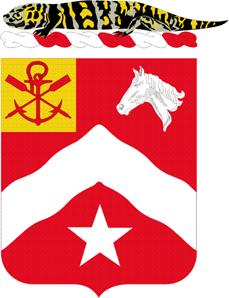
- 9th Engineer Battalion coat of arms
- Active: 1917–1945; 1952–1991; 1996–2013; 2015–present
- Country: United States
- Branch: US Army Corps of Engineers
- Type: Brigade Engineer Battalion (BEB)
- Garrison/HQ: Fort Stewart, GA
- Nicknames: Gilas; 9E
- Mottos: "Asistiremos" (Spanish: We will assist); "First to Cross!"
- Anniversaries: Crossing of the Ludendorff Bridge 7 March 1945

Insignia
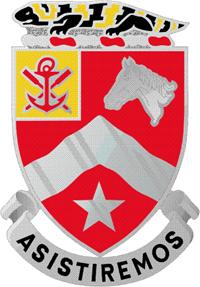
- Distinctive Unit Insignia

The 9th Engineer Battalion is a unit of the United States Army that deploys to designated contingency areas and conducts combat and/or stability operations in support of a brigade combat team. It is a divisional mechanized combat engineer unit, composed of three line companies and a headquarters company. Its mission is to provide assured mobility, counter-mobility, general engineering, and survivability support, with well trained sappers (combat engineers) ready to deploy anywhere at any time. The unit's history spans service in 1917 in the US southwest, World War II in France and Germany, multiple deployments to the Balkans, and multiple deployments in support of the global war on terrorism in Iraq and Afghanistan. It is most famous for the capture of the Ludendorff Bridge across the Rhine River. As of 18 May 2015, the battalion exists as the 9th Brigade Engineer Battalion (9th BEB) in Fort Stewart, GA under 2nd Armored Brigade Combat Team, 3rd Infantry Division.

== Unit insignia ==
The crest was approved by the Department of the Army and the 9th Engineer Battalion on 27 July 1967. All the symbols reflect the battalion's initial service in the southwest United States. The wreath under the Gila monster is the Corps of Engineer wreath. The Gila monster represents service along the Gila River and the southwest desert from 1917 to 1920 (added to the insignia in 1925). The ship anchor and oars are the coat of arms from 9E's original parent unit, the 2nd Battalion Mounted Engineers. The horse head represents service as Mounted Engineers (1917–1941) and Armored Engineers (1941–1945). The wavy chevron running across the shield represents service along the Rio Grande from 1917 to 1920. The lone star on the bottom represents service in Texas from 1917 to 1921. The motto "Asistiremos" was added in 1925, meaning "We Will Assist" in Spanish.

== History ==
=== Early history ===
The battalion was constituted 15 May 1917 in the Regular Army as the 2nd Battalion Mounted Engineers. They were organized 21 May 1917 at Camp Newton D. Baker, El Paso, Texas, and redesignated the 9th Engineers (Mounted) in July 1917. The 9th spent its first years in El Paso while serving at Camp Stewart, Texas.

After World War I, the battalion was declared inactive except for A Company, which was transferred to Fort Riley, Kansas to provide engineer support to the Cavalry School. From 1923 to 1936, A Company provided vital training and infrastructure support to the Cavalry School first as a unit of the 2nd Cavalry Division and later as Troop A, 9th Engineer Squadron. The performance of Troop A during this period established a tradition of excellence for the 9th Engineer Squadron as a mounted cavalry unit. The platoon leader during a significant portion of that period was 1LT Samuel D. Sturgis III, later to become the Chief of Engineers as a lieutenant general.

=== World War II ===
Following the outbreak of World War II, the battalion was activated as the 9th Armored Engineer Battalion, part of the 9th Armored Division. Landing in France in October 1944 from their staging base in England, the 9th Armored Engineers supported the division's movement across France, making first contact with the enemy in the Schoenfels-Wilwerdange-Bissen area.

==== Battle of the Bulge ====
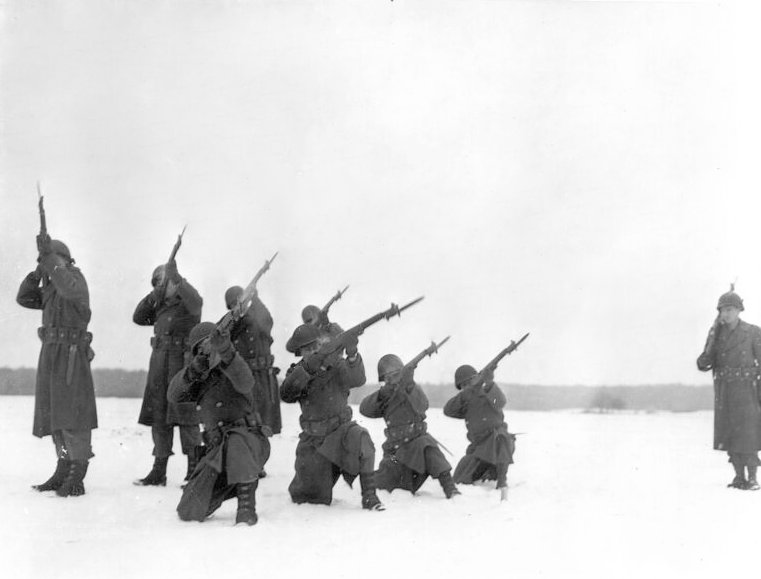
Members of C Company, 9th Engineers, conduct a memorial service for those killed during the Siege of Bastogne, 22 January 1945.

The battalion fought in the Battle of the Bulge in December 1944. In the battle, B Company operated under Combat Command B (CCB) of the 9th Armored Division and figured prominently in the Battle of St. Vith. B Company prepared three bridges for demolitions, one in Steinbruck and two in and around Galhausen. Of the 3, only one required demolition. It reinforced bridges and improved roads throughout the area and also performed counter-mobility missions such as booby trapping the woods around Galhausen and laying a minefield in the vicinity of Lierneaux. The B Company Commander was captured on 22 December 1944 when the 27th AIB CP Aid Station was overrun. The Company suffered 10 casualties during the Battle of the Bulge: five men missing in action, and five men wounded in action. The Company lost one half track, seven 2 ½ ton trucks, one ¾ ton weapons carrier, and two 2 ½ ton 4×4 trucks.

C Company figuring prominently in the defense of Bastogne, for which the company was awarded the Presidential Unit Citation. They are credited with blocking six roads from the south and east of Bastogne from 20 to 27 December, losing ground only once before regaining it four hours later. Prior to Bastogne, C Company was involved heavily in the Allied fighting withdrawal in the face of the German advance, improving defensive positions and fighting as infantry until they withdrew to Bastogne at 1915 on 19 December. In the Battle of the Bulge, they suffered three KIA, three died of wounds, 11 missing in action, 12 wounded in action.

==== The Ludendorff Bridge ====
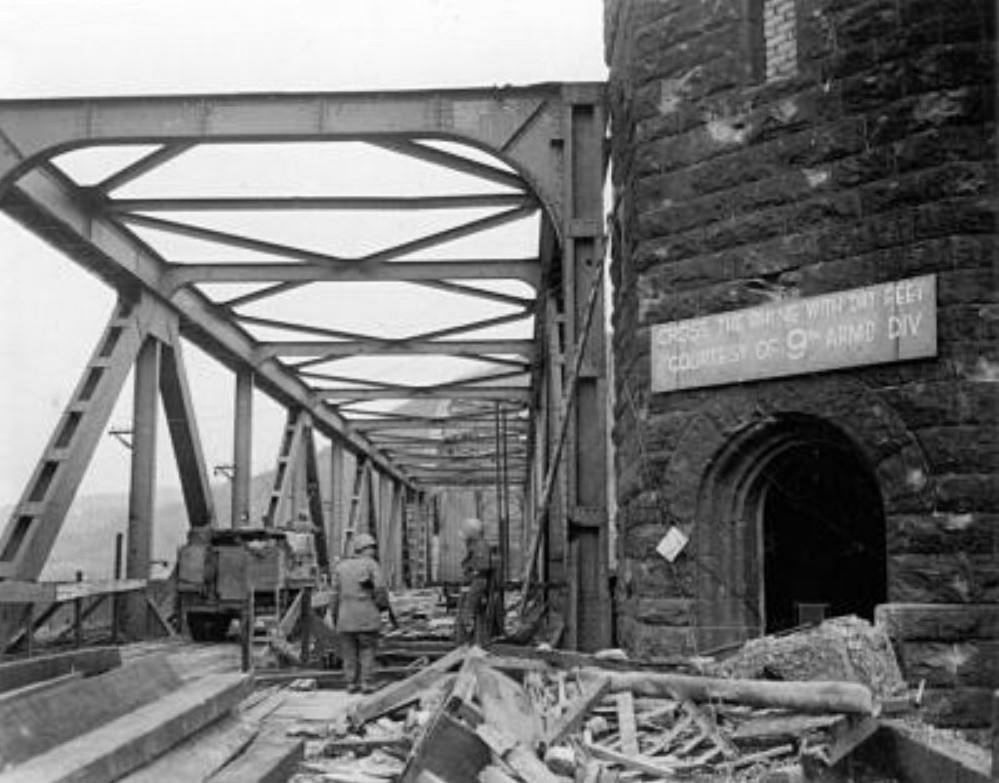
"CROSS THE RHINE WITH DRY FEET COURTESY OF 9TH ARM'D DIV"

On 7 March 1945, during Operation Lumberjack, to clear the area west of the Rhine of German troops, Combat Command B of the 9th Armored Division arrived at the town of Remagen. They were surprised to discover that the Ludendorff railroad bridge over the Rhine river was intact. A three-man detachment from 2nd Platoon, B Company—Lieutenant Hugh Mott, Staff Sergeant John Reynolds, and Sergeant Eugene Dorland—accompanied the first squad of A/27th AIB to reduce the remaining explosives after the German's unsuccessful attempt to destroy the bridge. Crossing with lead elements, Dorland destroyed the main demolition switch box on the far shore. The remainder of B Company, 9th Engineers followed with the rest of A/27th AIB, finding and neutralizing more explosives on the bridge. After the crossing was initially secured, Lt. Mott led B Company in the hasty bridge repairs that allowed the first nine Sherman tanks to gingerly creep across the bridge at 2200 and begin securing the bridgehead.

The next day, C Company kept the bridge open and traffic moving despite a continuous, intense artillery and aircraft attack that struck the bridge twenty-four times. C Co also created and mounted a sign on the tower alongside the western approach announcing,"CROSS THE RHINE WITH DRY FEET COURTESY OF 9TH ARMD DIV." C Co was relieved of its responsibility for the bridge at 0830 10 March 1945. When the smoke cleared, the 9th Armored Engineers had been instrumental in establishing the first bridgehead across the Rhine River since the Napoleonic Campaigns. The unit was awarded the oak leaf for their Presidential Unit Citation for their actions at Remagen.

The 9th Engineers were in the final sweep into Germany. It moved through Limburg from 26 to 28 March, Marburg 29–30 March, Warburg 31 March – 6 April, crossed the Unstrut River on 11 April, the Saale River 12 April, through Trebson 16–21 April. A Company moved through Goldorf, Czechoslovakia on 1 May. After the Nazi surrender, the battalion established an occupation headquarters in the Bavarian city of Bayreuth, with A Company at Coburg, B Company at Kulmbach, and C Company at Hof. Occupation duty ended in late 1945, so the battalion left West Germany and was inactivated on 13 October 1945.

=== The Cold War ===
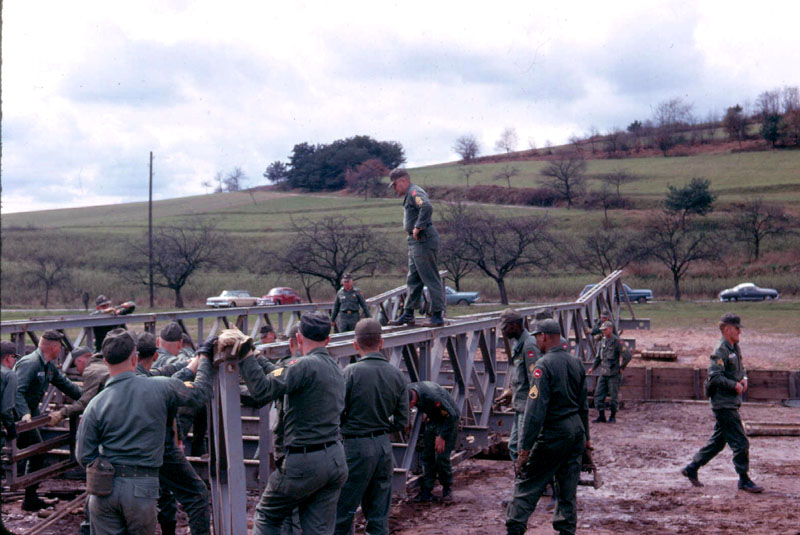
A Co builds a Bailey bridge during training near Aschaffenburg, 1966.

In 1952, the 9th Engineers were reactivated as the 9th Engineer Combat Battalion (Army) at Fort Lewis, Washington as part of the US arms build-up for the Korean War. In autumn of 1957, the 9th Engineer Battalion moved to and replaced the 35th Engineers at Kitzingen, Germany, moving to Aschaffenburg within the year as part of the US Army's "Gyroscope" plan of rotating units overseas. In February and March, 1960 the battalion participates in the enormous Maneuver Wintershield. The battalion remained in Europe, serving as a Corps-level engineer asset as part of the 7th Engineer Brigade, VII Corps, preparing for and helping deter a Communist invasion of West Germany. For much of this time, it was in direct support to the German Army's 12th Panzer Division (since inactivated) until its deployment in the Persian Gulf War.

=== The Persian Gulf War ===
In 1991, under the command of Lieutenant Colonel Richard Jemiola, the 9th Engineers were organized in direct support of the 1st Infantry Division for operations in the Persian Gulf War. The 9th Engineer Battalion, together with the 1st Engineer Battalion, led the 1st Infantry Division through the Desert Breach, and assisted in liberating Kuwait. The battalion returned to Aschaffenburg, where it was inactivated in late 1992.

=== The Balkans ===
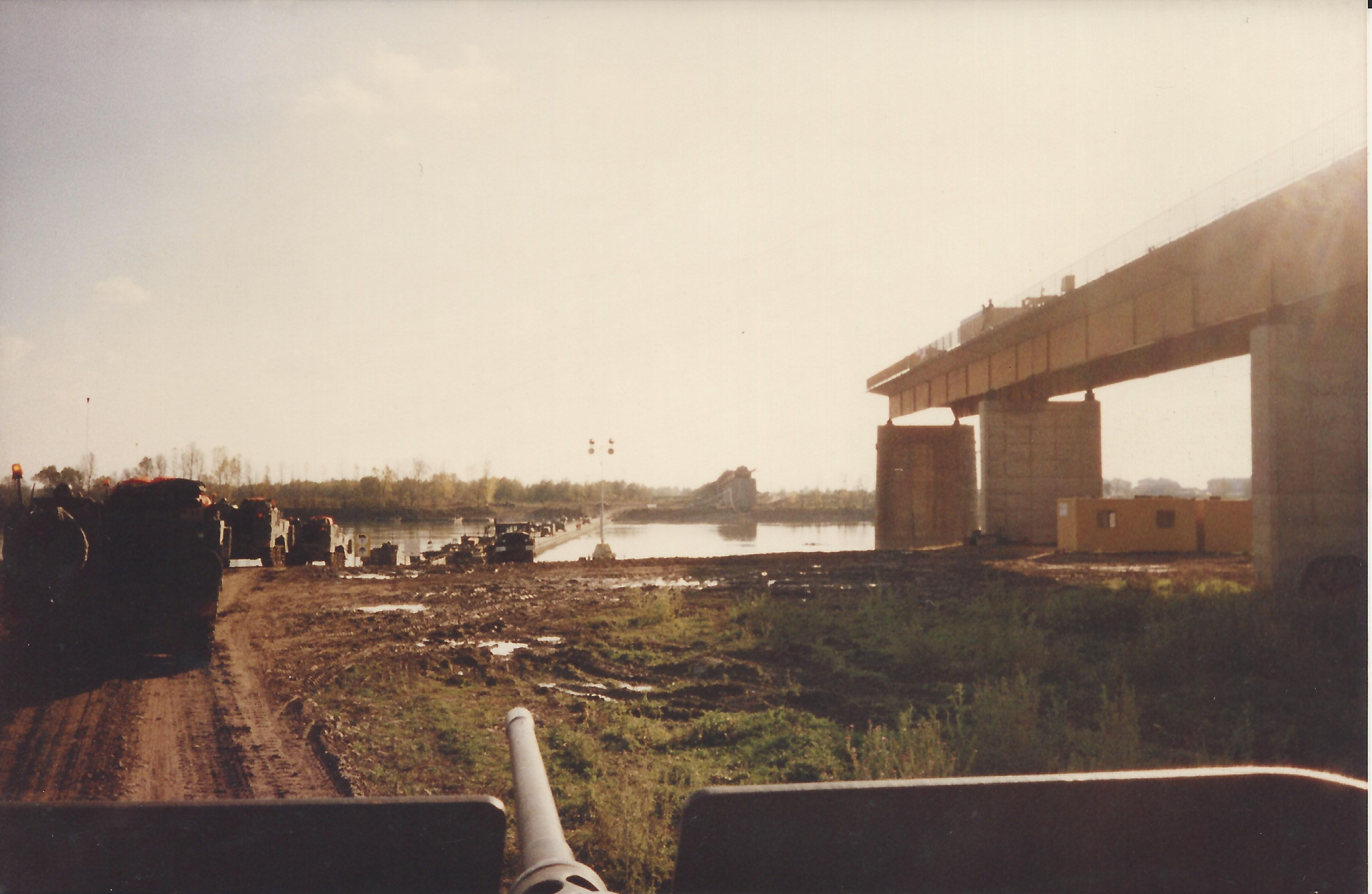
9E crosses the Sava River into Bosnia, October 2006

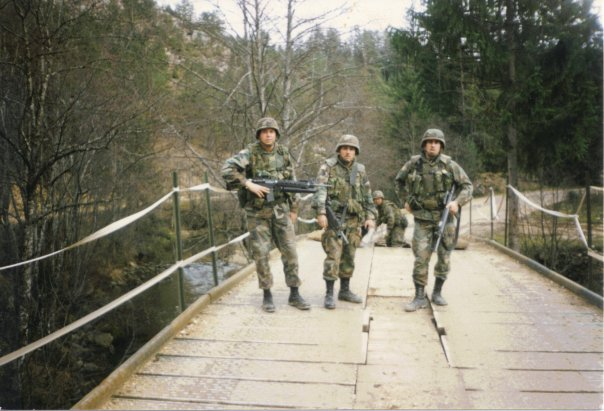
9E Soldiers inspect an AVLB crossing in the Bosnia Zone of Separation (ZOS), 1996

The battalion was reactivated as part of the 1st Infantry Division in Schweinfurt, Germany on 5 April 1996. In October 1996, the battalion (minus Charlie Company) deployed with the 2nd Brigade Combat Team as part of the covering force for Operation Joint Endeavor and Joint Guard. The battalion was split between Camp Demi and Camp Dobol. The battalion provided Engineer Support, supervising former warring factions (FWF) in the clearance, proofing, and marking of minefields. The battalion conducted extensive bridge, route, and minefield reconnaissance missions, destroyed weapons caches, served as a direct peacekeeping force, and breached at least one minefield unilaterally at Dr. Pepper Bypass at Omerbegovaca. The Battalion manned Checkpoint 34A (Jusici, Bosnia) alongside Russian soldiers in January 1997. The battalion was replaced by elements of the 82nd Engineers out of Bamberg, Germany, (Blue Babes) and returned to Ledward Barracks in Schweinfurt in April 1997. For its actions in Bosnia, the battalion was awarded the Army Superior Unit Award.

The 9th Engineer Battalion was deployed to the Balkans as part of Kosovo Force (KFOR) during Operation Joint Guardian II in June 1999 under Task Force Falcon. It was the first U.S. battalion to stand up at Camp Bondsteel, Kosovo. The Companies operated in several villages which included Gnjilane, Cernica, Uglari, Podgrađe, and Stansior. Missions conducted included route reconnaissance, unexploded ordnance (UXO) reconnaissance, bunker busting, bunker building, checkpoint operations, obstacle construction, rebuilding an elementary school, and securing Pristina Airfield for President Bill Clinton's first visit to Kosovo. Reported accomplishments included six cordon & search missions, ten obstacle emplacement missions, three obstacle repair missions, 189 Explosive Ordnance Disposal (EOD) incident responses, ten post blast analyses, eight vertical construction projects, over 40 kilometers of road improvement, donated over 100 boxes of toys to three sponsored schools, and over 200 escort missions. The battalion returned to Schweinfurt in December 1999, and returned for a second tour in Kosovo from May to November 2002. In August and September 2003, Alpha Company deployed to Bosnia in support of Task Force 1–18's Dynamic Response Exercise.

=== Iraq War ===
==== Initial invasion ====
In 2003, the 9th Engineers prepared to participate in the 2003 invasion of Iraq, by deploying select personnel with a large fleet of vehicles to Turkey, but that was cancelled because of Turkish refusal to participate in the Iraqi invasion.

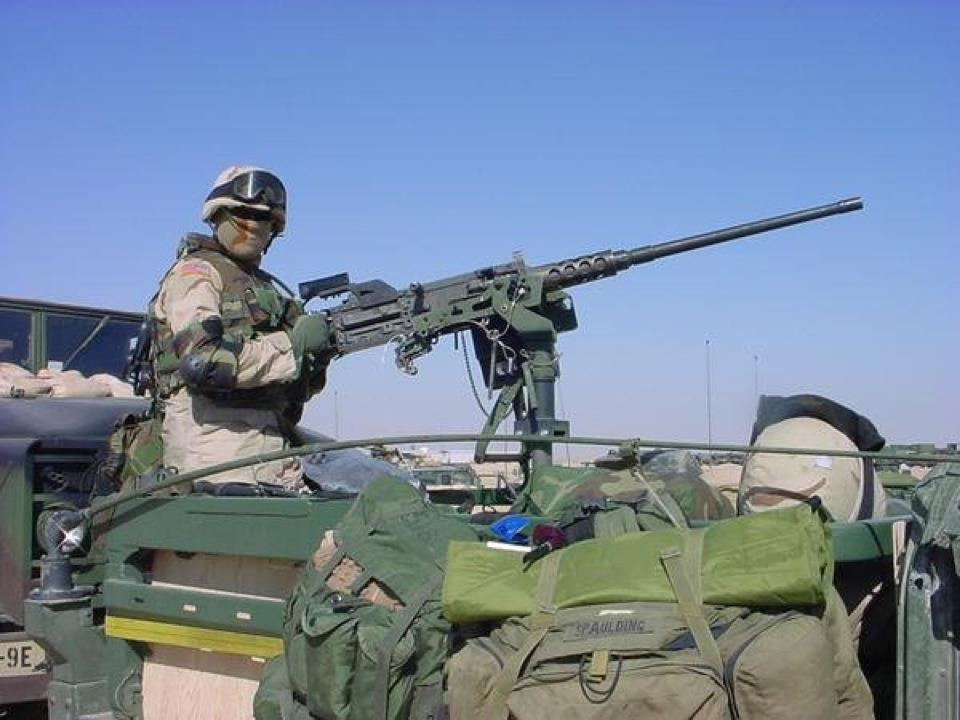
1st Platoon, Bravo Company, TF 9E crosses the border into Iraq, 2004.

==== OIF II ====
In February 2004, the battalion deployed to Kuwait for month-long training before their deployment in support of Operation Iraqi Freedom (OIF) II.

In OIF II, the 9th Engineer Battalion, reorganized and augmented as Task Force 9th Engineer. The headquarters occupied Forward Operating Base Remagen in Tikrit, Salah ad Din province, but elements of it operated as far south as Balad and north into Bayji. In February 2005, the battalion redeployed to Schweinfurt, Germany. In March 2006, the 9th Engineer Battalion was permanently assigned to the 2nd Brigade Combat Team, 1st Infantry Division. On 28 March 2008, when the 1st Infantry Division completed its move to Fort Riley, the 9th Engineer Battalion came under operational control of 1st Armored Division.

==== OIF 06–08 ====
In September 2006, the 9th Engineers was deployed in support of Operation Iraqi Freedom 06–08. Charlie Company was detached and assigned to Ramadi where they operated as a route clearance company. Alpha and HHC were based at Camp Liberty. Alpha operated throughout west Baghdad, maintaining two organic Route Clearance Packages, one attached Route Clearance Package from the 2/12 infantry BN E Co. with an FSC for heavy transport, 1st Cavalry Division, and one construction Platoon. Alpha and HHC were instrumental in the establishment of the Baghdad Security Belt, an integrated set of obstacles around Baghdad which would force insurgent forces entering and exiting the city to move through manned checkpoints manned by Iraqi Army and Police. Bravo Company was attached to Task Force 1-26 Infantry and operated in Eastern Baghdad. From August 2006 to January 2007 they had the mission to fight as Infantry. In February 2007, they transitioned to conducting route clearance for the remainder of the deployment. The battalion returned to Schweinfurt, Germany, after a 15-month deployment, in mid November 2007.

==== OIF 08–10 ====
On order, Task Force (TF) Gila conducts full spectrum engineer and multi-functional support operations to support the 172ND Infantry Brigade (172D IN BDE) in Area of Operations (AO) Blackhawk to establish a safe, secure and stable environment.

— TF Gila Mission Statement, OIF 08-10

In March 2008, the battalion changed patches as their parent unit, 2nd Dagger Brigade of the 1st Infantry Division, was reflagged as the 172d Separate Infantry Brigade, "Blackhawks". TF Gila again deployed to Iraq in November 2008 in support of OIF 08–10 with the Brigade's Signal (57SIG), Military Intelligence (504MI), and Brigade Headquarters Companies attached. The battalion was based at FOB Kalsu, supporting the Brigade throughout the five provinces in its Area of Operations (Wasit, Babil, Karbala, Najaf, and Qadisiah). On 1 January 2009 Soldiers in Iraq started operating under new rules in compliance with the newly minted U.S.–Iraq Status of Forces Agreement. The most significant policy shift affected troops on the ground by putting Iraqi forces in the operational lead in most areas. Under the agreement, TF Gila Route Clearance Packages only operated during daylight hours partnered with Iraqi forces, and could only conduct unilateral operations at night. Before redeploying, Iraqi Route Clearance Units led TF Gila units on partnered missions. Gila Battalion supported the Iraqi Police (IP) and Iraqi Army (IA) as they secured voting sites and ballots for the 2009 local elections.

Alpha Company found 65 unexploded ordnances (UXOs), five explosively formed projectiles (EFPs), and one improvised explosive device (IED). While conducting over 500 route clearance missions throughout OIF 08–10, the Apaches cleared 25,000 kilometers of main and alternate supply routes (MSR and ASR) to maintain mobility corridors and trafficability throughout the 172d Brigade AO. The company conducted over 200 construction missions, the most notable projects including the demolition of FOB Kalsu's detainee holding area (DHA), the construction a fuel point on Patrol Base (PB) Hamiyah, and the construction of two ranges at Razazah in support of the ISF's training regimen. One highlight of the Apache construction effort was exemplified by the edification of a primary road utilized by millions of Iraqis during a pilgrimage to Karbala, Iraq to recognize the holy day of Ashura.

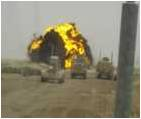
Bravo clears route with a MICLIC in Iraq, 2009.

Bravo Company, 9th Engineer Battalion was assigned to TF 3-66 AR (Black Knights) during the OIF 08–10 deployment in Diyala Governorate. From January to October 2009, Bravo Co executed 253 route clearance missions covering 29,800 km of roads, finding 68 IEDs and striking 20. The company lost 9 vehicles, sustained 8 casualties, and received 59 Combat Action Badges. Furthermore, Bravo Co was responsible for the destruction of over 15 spider holes used by the insurgency as hide spots and cache points, and the reduction of over 100 pieces of UXO scattered along the Iranian border that hindered military travel along border routes. No element following a Bravo Co route clearance patrol was ever struck by an IED. On 4 May, Bravo Co successfully launched four mine-clearing line charges (MICLICs) to breach RTE Headhunters, a heavily mined route, detonating at least 4 IEDs and multiple anti-tank mines during the initial breach. In doing so, the company became one of only a handful of engineer companies to conduct the task in a combat environment since the start of war in Iraq.

Bravo Co provided general engineering support to the task force. The company oversaw the construction of several COPs which included the addition of T-Walls, urine soak pits, burn latrines, and personal hygiene stands. The Society of American Military Engineers awarded Bravo Company the 2009 Itschner Award. The Itschner Award is named in honor of Army Lt. Gen. Emerson C. Itschner. It is presented annually to the one active and one reserve component engineer company judged to be the Army's best during the award year.

Charlie Company, 9th Engineer Battalion deployed to FOB Kalsu in Babil Province, Iraq. The "Dawgs of War" conducted route clearance, route reconnaissance, and general engineering missions in five provinces to include Babil, Wasit, Karbala, Diwaniyah, and Najaf.

The battalion redeployed to Schweinfurt, Germany in November 2009.

=== Afghanistan ===
The 9th Engineer Battalion, designated as Task Force Gila, deployed to eastern Afghanistan in July 2011 in support of Operation Enduring Freedom – Afghanistan under the 172d Infantry Brigade. For the Deployment, the 172d Brigade Headquarters Company, the 504th Military Intelligence Company, and the 57th Signal Company fell under the Command of Task Force Gila.

The Headquarters and Headquarters Company (HHC) of the 9th Engineers operated out of Forward Operating Base Rushmore (Sharan District, Paktika Province). In addition to providing Command and Control of TF Gila, HHC conducted training and partnership operations with the Afghan Uniformed Police (AUP) and the Afghan Local Police (ALP) in Paktika. HHC was augmented by a platoon from the 554th Military Police Company who were the main effort in the training of AUP and ALP throughout the province. HHC's Support Platoon also conducted partnered patrols throughout the province in order to allow key leaders of the AUP as well as TF Gila to conduct battlefield circulation to outlying AUP checkpoints.

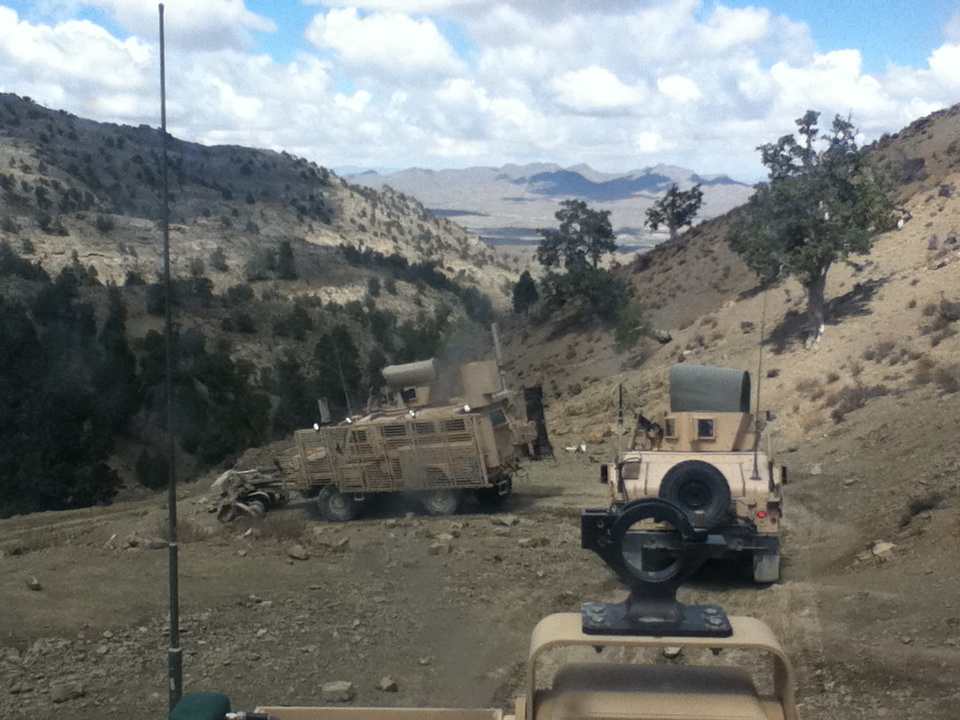
Alpha conducts route clearance patrol partnered with an Afghan Army Route Clearance Company through the mountains of Paktika, Afghanistan in 2012

Alpha Company, 9th Engineers served as a route clearance and route improvement Company based at Forward Operating Base Sharana (Sharan District, Paktika Province). The company's two route clearance platoons (coded RCP 5 and RCP 6) helped maintain freedom of maneuver throughout Paktika province and as far north as Ghazni City and operated extensively with the Afghan RCC (Route Clearance Company) from 2nd Brigade, 203 Corps, who took complete responsibility for device detection and clearance by the end of the deployment. Notable achievements included arriving by land to COP Curry, COP Tillman and COP Waza Khwa for the first time in over a year. The RCP platoons also performed construction security, logistical support, and traffic control point missions routinely. The company had a construction section that partnered extensively with Afghan engineers to accomplish road improvement, culvert repair, and facilities construction. They were known for their ability to move a small team to a remote COP by helicopter, repair significant structural damage to buildings using only materials at hand, and leave within two weeks. Two additional platoons from Alpha were detached to assist with the handover of COP Waza Kwah in southwest Paktika to Afghan National Security Forces (ANSF). Following the handover, those two Platoons augmented Able and Venom Companies of TF Black Scarves (1st Battalion, 2nd Infantry Regiment) in Andar, Ghazni with the mission to fight as Infantry.

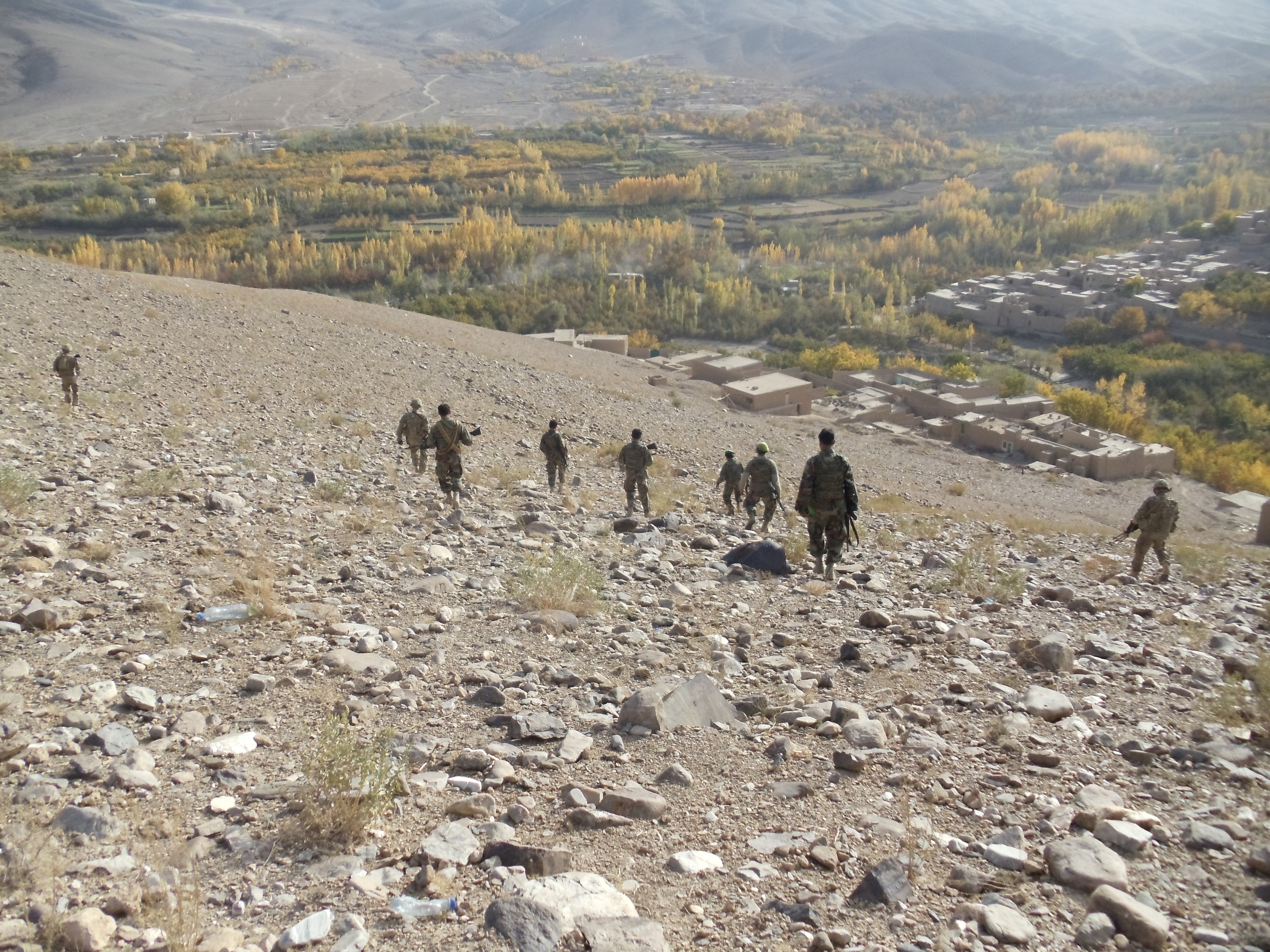
1st Platoon, Charlie Company on a partnered patrol with Afghan Army in Chak District, Wardak Province, November 2011

Bravo Company, 9th Engineers, fell under the 2nd Battalion, 28th Infantry Regiment, operating out of Combat Outpost Curry (Gomal District, Paktika Province) with the mission to fight as Infantry. While stationed in Gomal, Bravo Company worked with ANSF to increase security, governance, economy, and partnership in the district. ANSF partnership was the primary mission for Bravo Company, and they worked daily with the Afghan National Army (ANA), Afghan Border Police (ABP), and Afghan National Police (ANP). The Sappers went on security patrols throughout Gomal District, both mounted and dismounted. Despite rugged terrain, the ANSF and Bravo Company successfully patrolled throughout the largest district in Paktika Province. Bravo leaders and Soldiers trained ANSF Soldiers and Policemen to enhance their capabilities, allowing ANSF to conduct unilateral patrols by the spring of 2012. Because of COP Curry's remote location in Paktika, resupply was accomplished via the Air Force's Air Delivery Systems (ADS). Bravo regularly received food, water, fuel, and ammunition via air drop. During the deployment, they also received the largest air drop to date in operation Enduring Freedom, accepting a 4K all-terrain forklift.

Charlie Company served under several successive Task Forces from 2011 to 2012: TF Warrior, TF Thunder, TF Gunner, and TF Black Scarves. Charlie operated out of COP Sayed Abad (Sayed Abad District, Wardak Province), COP Dashe Towpe (Chak District, Wardak Province), and COP Band E Sardeh (Andar District, Ghazni Province) with the mission to fight as Infantry. In Wardak, Charlie Company augmented an Afghan Army Kandak and TF Warrior in a clear-hold-build operation to secure the Chak District Center. After helping to establish security and an enduring Afghan and ISAF presence in the District Center, Charlie continued partnered counterinsurgency operations alongside their Afghan Army partners throughout eastern Chak. In December 2011, Charlie moved to COP Band E Sardeh in Andar District, Ghazni to replace Alpha Company, 2nd Battalion, 2nd Infantry Regiment, 1st Infantry Division. Co-located with an Afghan Army Kandak, Charlie conducted partnered counterinsurgency operations in Andar, Dih Yak, and Giro Districts. Charlie's counterinsurgency efforts, empowering local leaders, and strengthening the local Afghan Army were likely instrumental in the "Andar Uprising" against the Taliban in the summer of 2012, beginning just as Charlie was redeploying.

TF Gila redeployed to Germany in June 2012 and inactivated on 31 May 2013.

As of 18 May 2015, the battalion exists as the 9th Brigade Engineer Battalion (9th BEB) in Fort Stewart, GA under 2nd Infantry Brigade Combat Team, 3rd Infantry Division.

== Lineage ==
Constituted 1917-05-15 in the Regular Army as the 2d Battalion, Mounted Engineers Organized 1917-05-21 at Camp Newton D. Baker, Texas Reorganized and redesignated in July 1917 as the 9th Engineers Assigned 1917-11-27 to the 15th Cavalry Division

- Relieved 1919-05-22 from assignment to the 15th Cavalry Division
- Battalion (less Company A) inactivated 1922-10-01 at Fort Sam Houston, Texas
- Assigned 1923-03-24 to the 2nd Cavalry Division
  2nd Cavalry Division shoulder sleeve insignia
- Company A inactivated 1930-04-19 at Fort Riley, Kansas
- Activated 1941-11-01 at Fort Riley, Kansas
- Reorganized and redesignated 1942-07-15 as the 9th Armored Engineer Battalion; concurrently relieved from assignment to the 2d Cavalry Division and assigned to the 9th Armored Division.
  9th Armored Division shoulder sleeve insignia
- Deployed from the New York Port of Embarkation on 1944-08-20.
- Arrived in England on 1944-08-26, and prepared for entrance into combat.
- Arrived in France on 1944-10-06, and immediately participated in the Rhineland Campaign.
- The 9th Engineer Battalion was withdrawn from the Rhineland Campaign and redirected to the Ardennes-Alsace Campaign on 1944-12-16.
- The Ardennes-Alsace Campaign was concluded on 1945-01-25, and the 9th Engineer Battalion returned to the Rhineland Campaign.
- The Rhineland Campaign concluded on 1945-03-21.
- The Central Europe Campaign commenced on 1945-03-22.
- The Central Europe Campaign concluded on 1945-05-11, and the 9th Engineer Battalion transitioned to Occupation mode.
- The 9th Engineer Battalion was located at Bayreuth, Germany on 1945-08-14.
  3rd Infantry Division shoulder sleeve insignia
- 9th EB returned to the Hampton Roads Port of Embarkation on 1945-10-12, and moved to Camp Patrick Henry.
- Inactivated 1945-10-13 at Camp Patrick Henry, Virginia
- Redesignated 1951-12-17 as the 9th Engineer Combat Battalion and relieved from assignment to the 9th Armored Division
  1st Infantry Division shoulder sleeve insignia
- Activated 1952-01-21 at Fort Lewis, Washington
  172d Infantry Brigade shoulder sleeve insignia
- Redesignated 1953-06-10 as the 9th Engineer Battalion
  3rd Infantry Division shoulder sleeve insignia
- Assigned 1991-10-16 to the 3d Infantry Division.
- Inactivated 1992-08-15 in Germany and relieved from assignment to the 3d Infantry Division
- Assigned 1996-02-16 to the 1st Infantry Division and activated in Schweinfurt, Germany
- Assigned 2008-03-15 to the 172nd Infantry Brigade Combat Team in Schweinfurt, Germany
- Inactivated 2013-05-31 in Schweinfurt, Germany as a component of the deactivation of the 172nd Infantry Brigade.
- Activated 2015-05-18 at Fort Stewart, Georgia as the brigade engineer battalion of 2nd (formerly 4th) Infantry Brigade Combat Team, 3rd Infantry Division.

== Honors ==
=== Campaign participation credit ===
- World War II
  European-African-Middle Eastern Campaign Medal streamer
  - Rhineland
  - Ardennes-Alsace
  - Central Europe
- Southwest Asia
  Southwest Asia service streamer
  - Defense of Saudi Arabia
  - Liberation and defense of Kuwait
  - Cease-fire
- Kosovo
  Kosovo Campaign Medal streamer
  - Kosovo Defense Campaign (pending completion of Operation Joint Guardian)
- War on terrorism
  - Iraq
    Iraq Campaign Streamer
    :
    - Transition of Iraq
    - Iraqi governance
    - National resolution
    - Iraqi surge
  - Afghanistan
    Afghanistan Campaign Streamer
    :
    - Transition I (pending completion of the phase)

=== Decorations ===
- Valorous Unit Award
  - Streamer embroidered SAMARRA, IRAQ
- Meritorious Unit Commendation (Army),
  - Streamer embroidered IRAQ 2004–2005
  - Streamer embroidered IRAQ 2008-2009 (excludes Bravo Company)
  - Streamer embroidered AFGHANISTAN 2011-2012 (excludes Bravo and Charlie Companies)
- Army Superior Unit Award
  - Streamer embroidered 1996–1997
- Headquarters Company additionally entitled to:
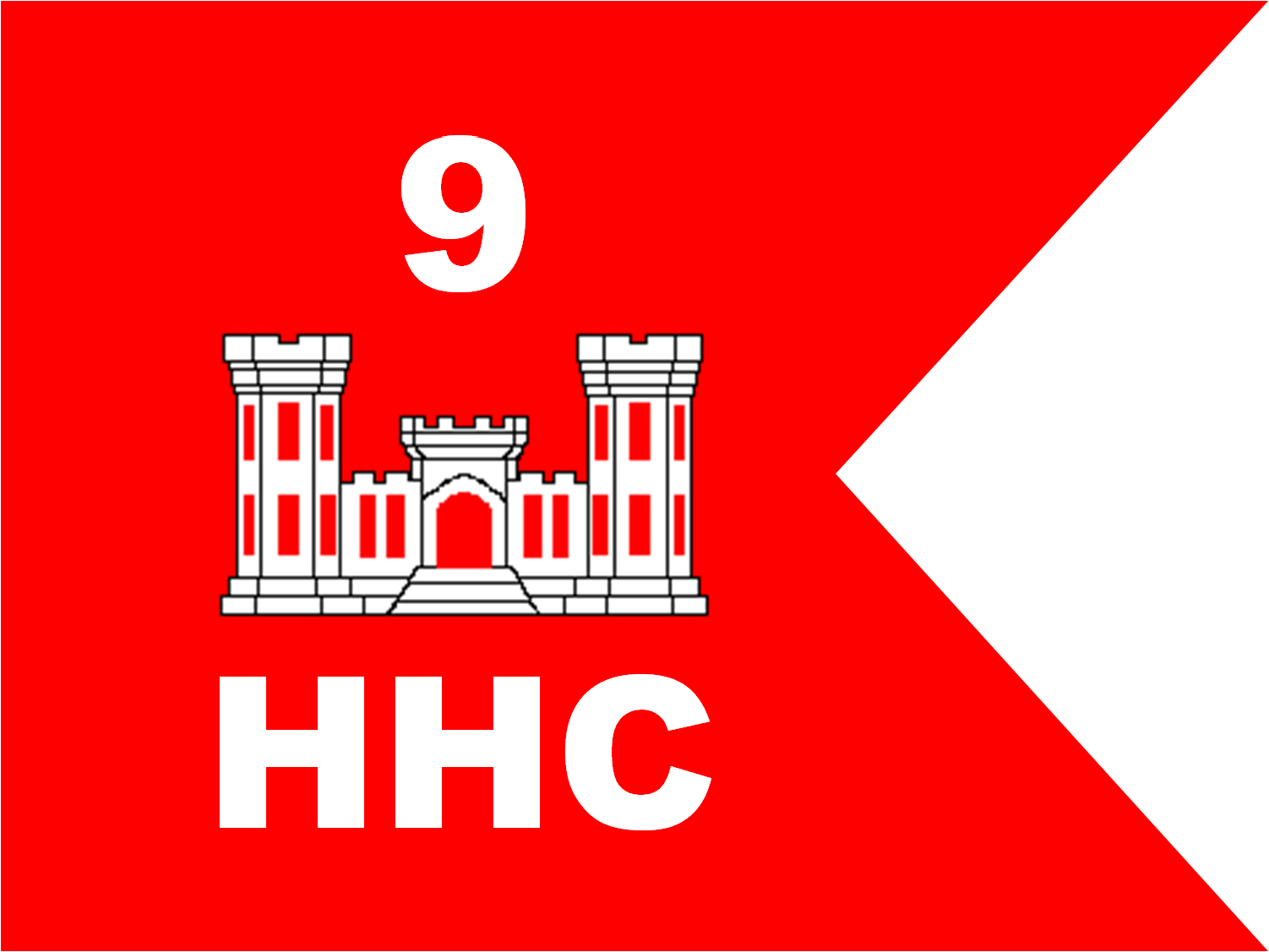
  HHC 9TH EN BN GUIDON
  - Meritorious Unit Commendation (Army), Streamer embroidered EUROPEAN THEATER
- Company A additionally entitled to:
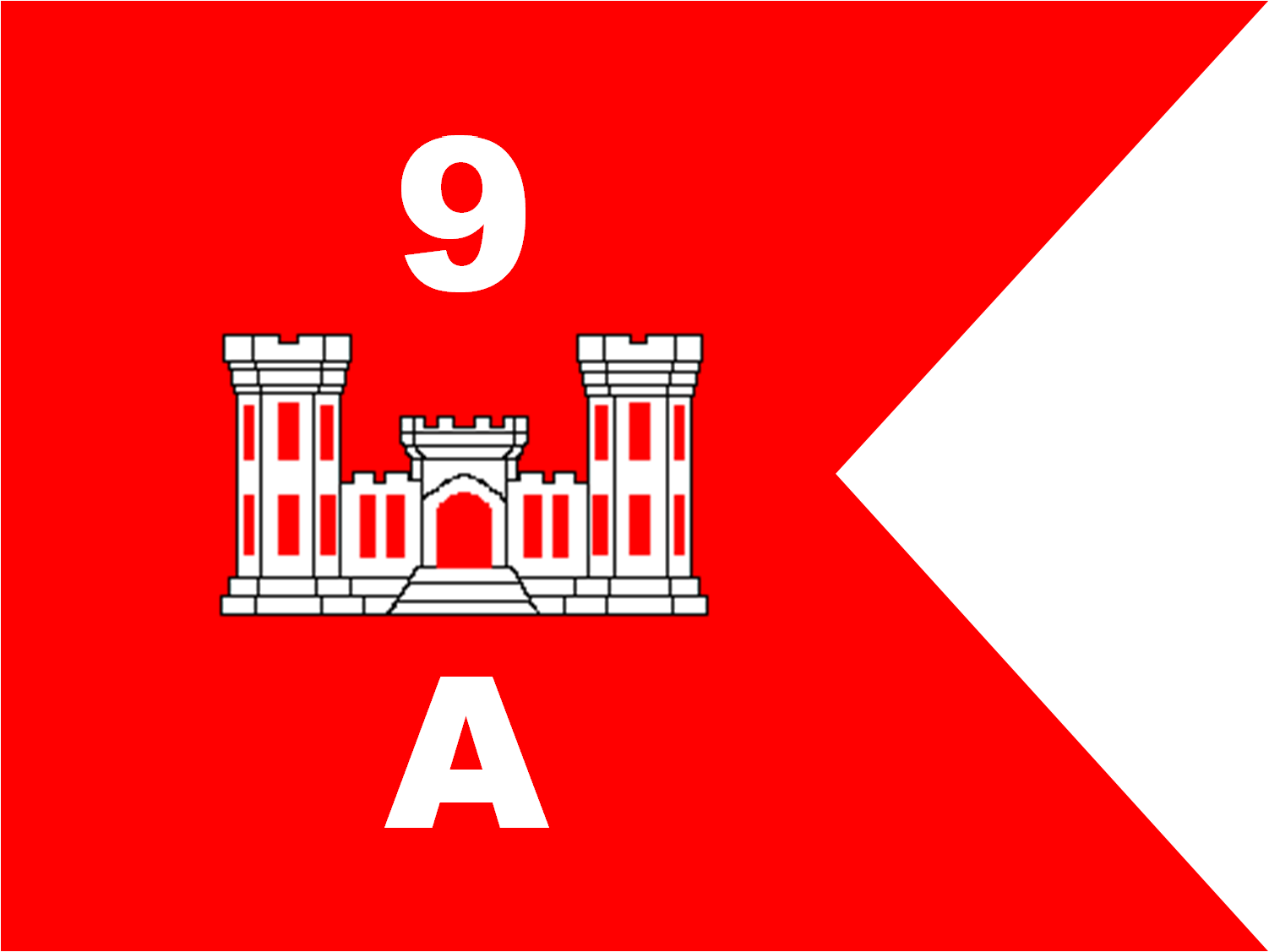
  ALPHA COMPANY 9TH EN BN GUIDON
  - Presidential Unit Citation (Army) Streamer embroidered LUXEMBOURG
  - Valorous Unit Award, Streamer embroidered IRAQ-KUWAIT 1991
  - Valorous Unit Award, for action in Baghdad (12 October 2006 to 17 November 2007)
- Company B additionally entitled to:
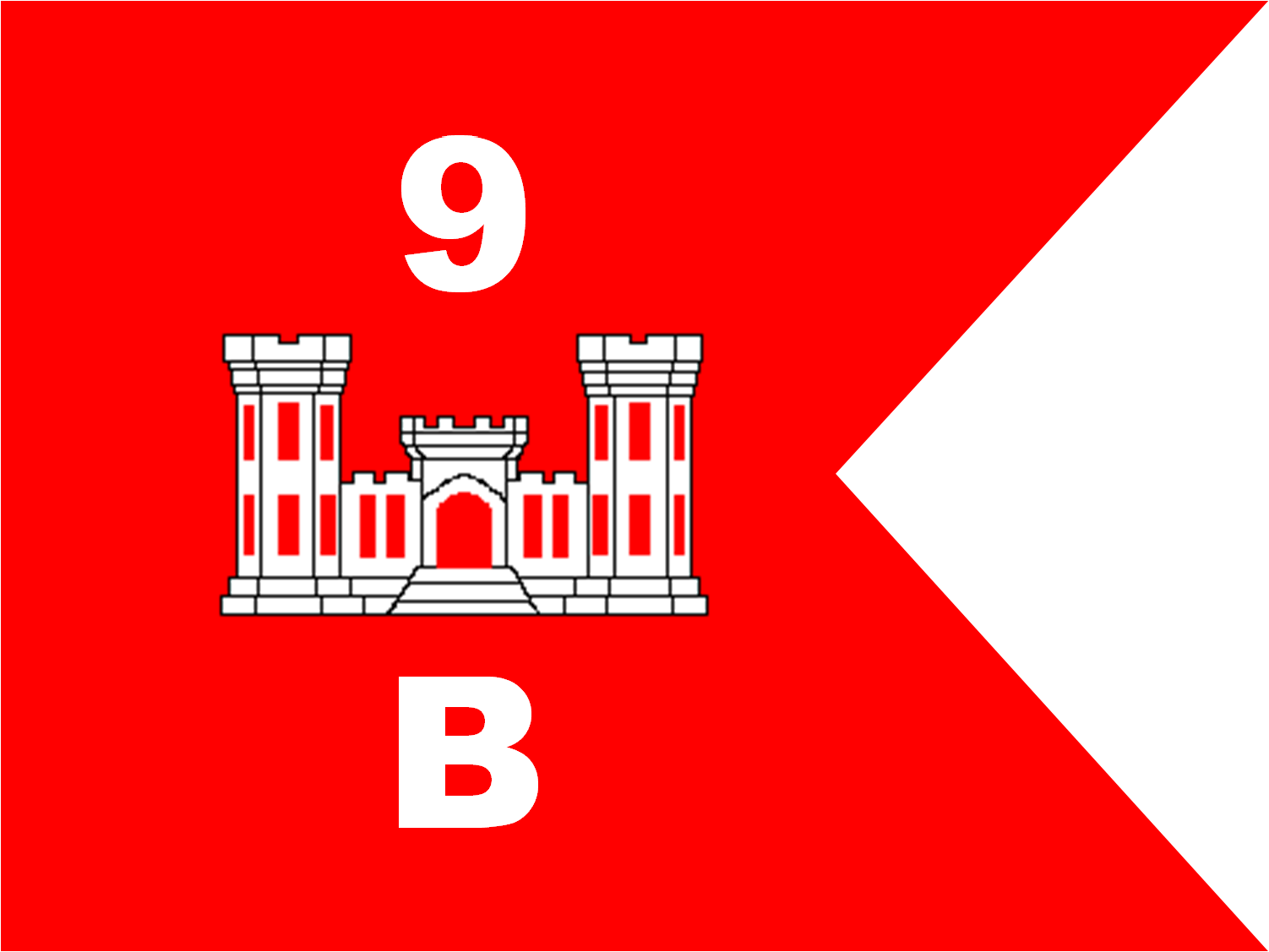
  BRAVO COMPANY 9TH EN BN GUIDON
  - Presidential Unit Citation (Army), Streamer embroidered ST. VITH
  - Presidential Unit Citation (Army), Streamer embroidered REMAGEN BRIDGEHEAD
  - Presidential Unit Citation (Army), Streamer embroidered ADHAMIYAH DISTRICT, BAGHDAD NOV 2006-MAY 2007
  - Valorous Unit Award, Streamer embroidered PAKTIKA PROVINCE AUG-NOV 2011
  - Meritorious Unit Commendation (Army), Streamer embroidered IRAQ OCT 2008-SEP 2009
  - Cited in the Order of the Day of the Belgian Army for action in the Ardennes
- Company C additionally entitled to:
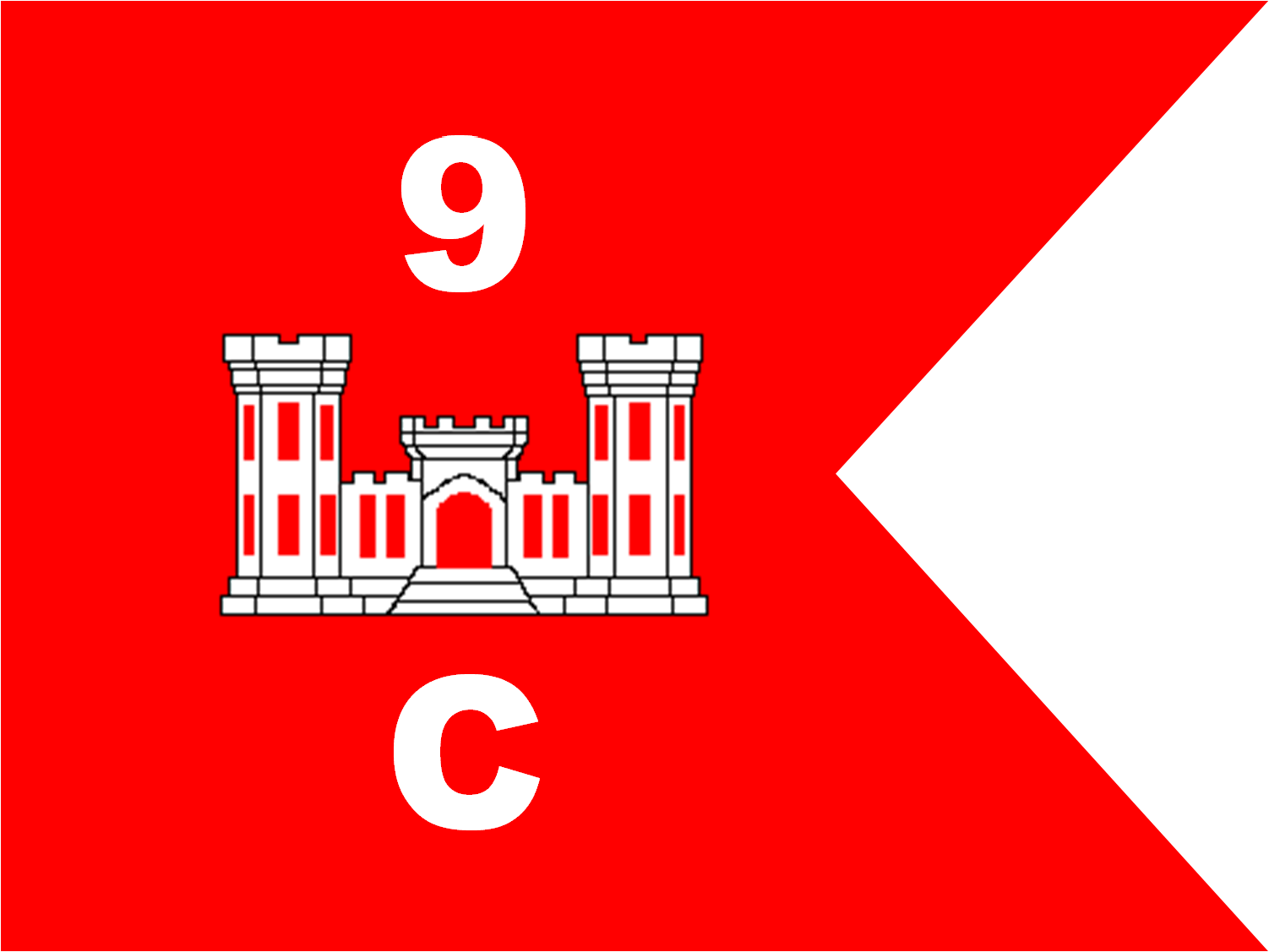
  CHARLIE COMPANY 9TH EN BN GUIDON
  - Presidential Unit Citation (Army), Streamer embroidered BASTOGNE
  - Presidential Unit Citation (Army), Streamer embroidered REMAGEN BRIDGEHEAD
  - Meritorious Unit Commendation (Army), Streamer embroidered AFGHANISTAN AUG 2011-JUN 2012
  - Belgian Croix de Guerre (1940) with Palm, Streamer embroidered BASTOGNE; cited in the Order of the Day of the Belgian Army for action at Bastogne

== Gallery ==
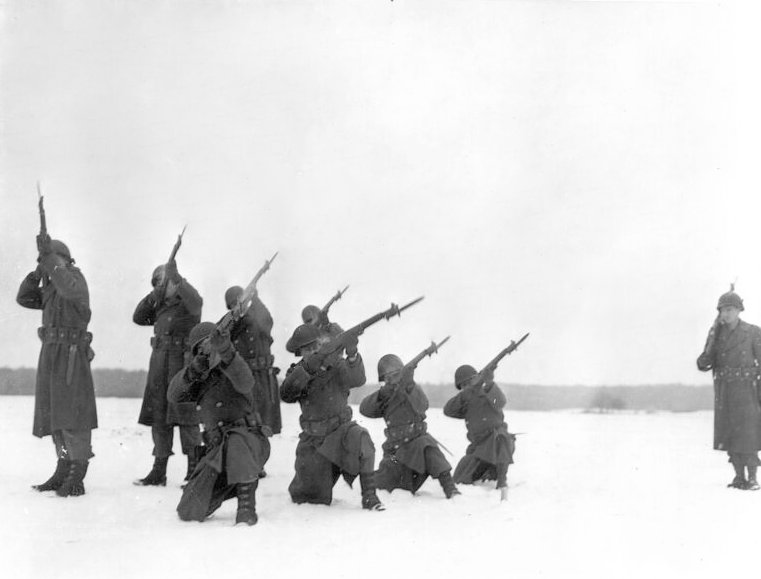
Memorial for CPT Dixie G. Griffin, B Company Commander, 5 November 1944

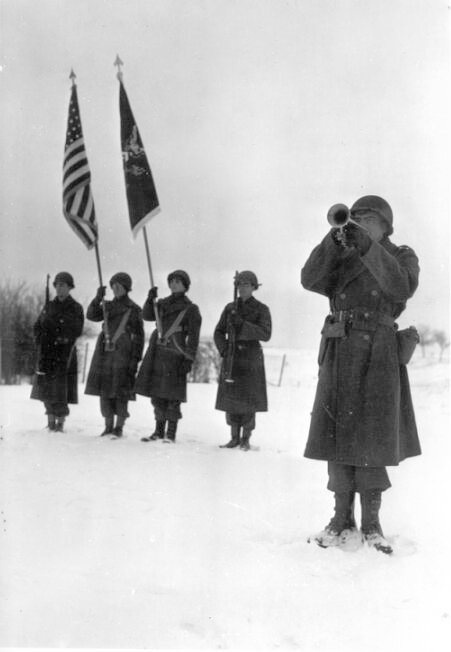
"Taps" at memorial ceremony for men of Company C, 9th Armored Engineer Battalion. Who were killed during siege of Bastogne, Belgium.

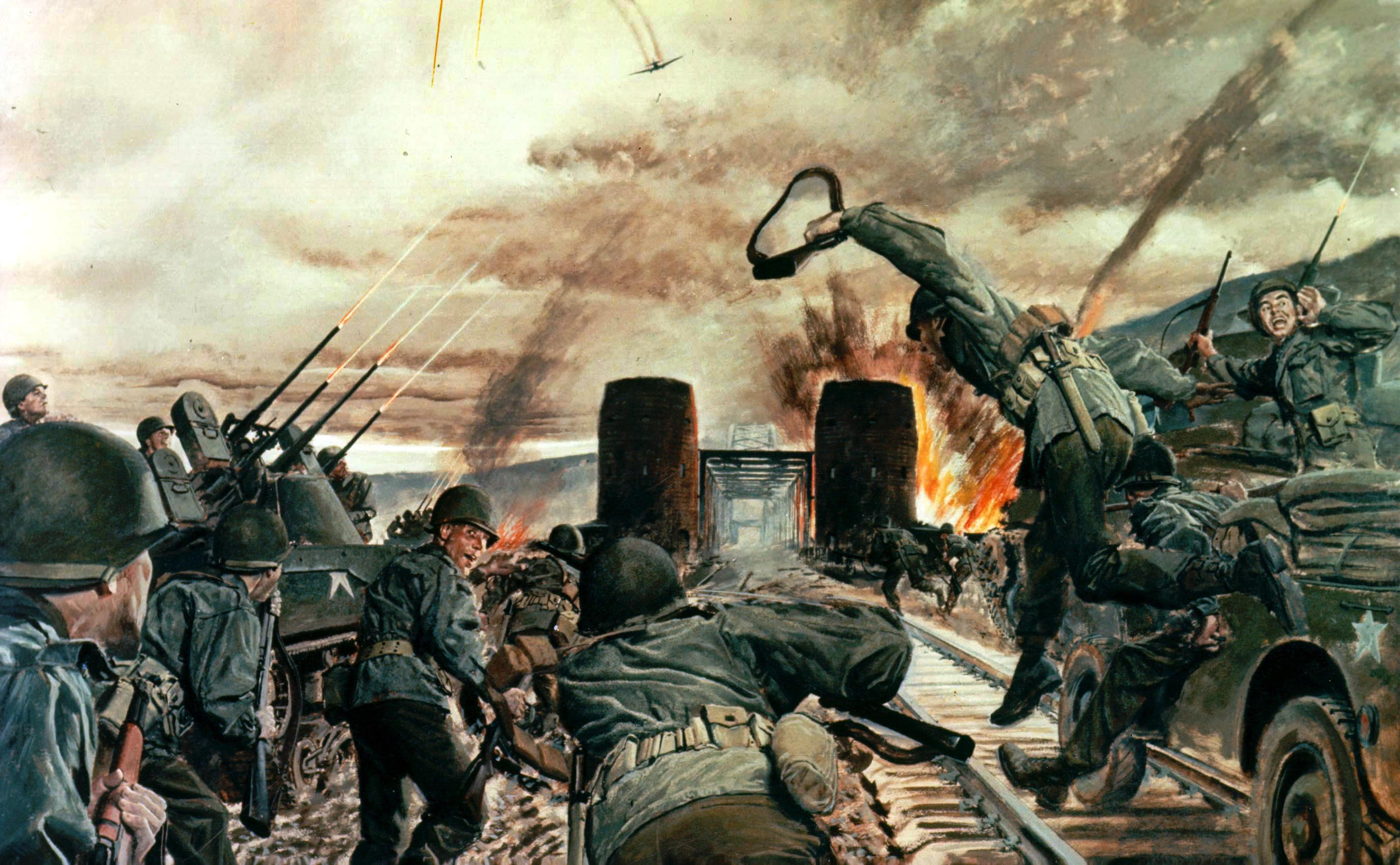
Poster printed by the US Army commemorating the capturing of the Ludendorff Bridge at Remagen.

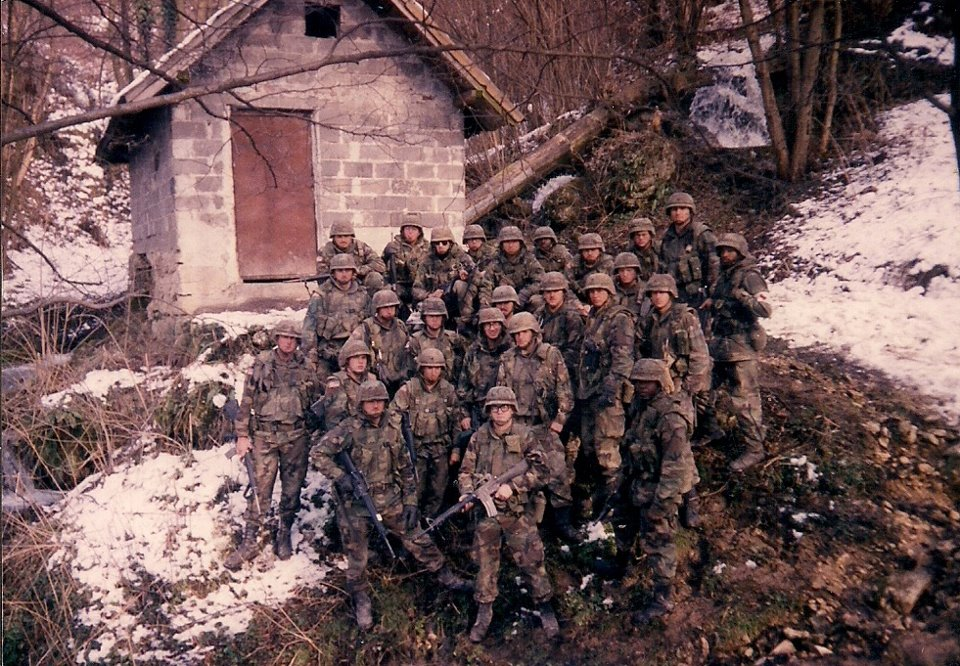
2nd Platoon Bravo Co, 9th Engineer Battalion conducting a bunker busting mission in Bosnia, 1996.

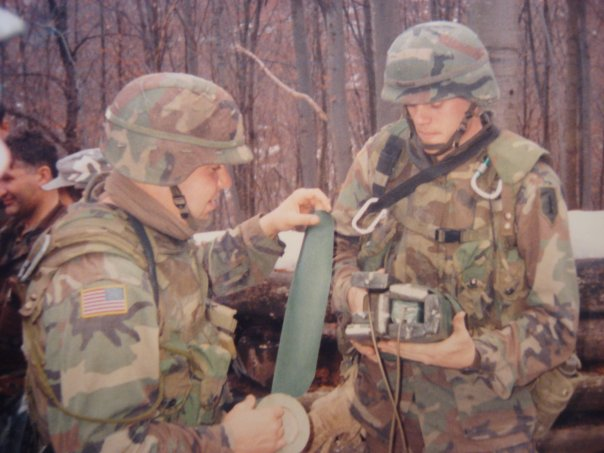
Soldiers of 9th Engineer Battalion preparing explosive charges in Bosnia Zone of Separation 1996.

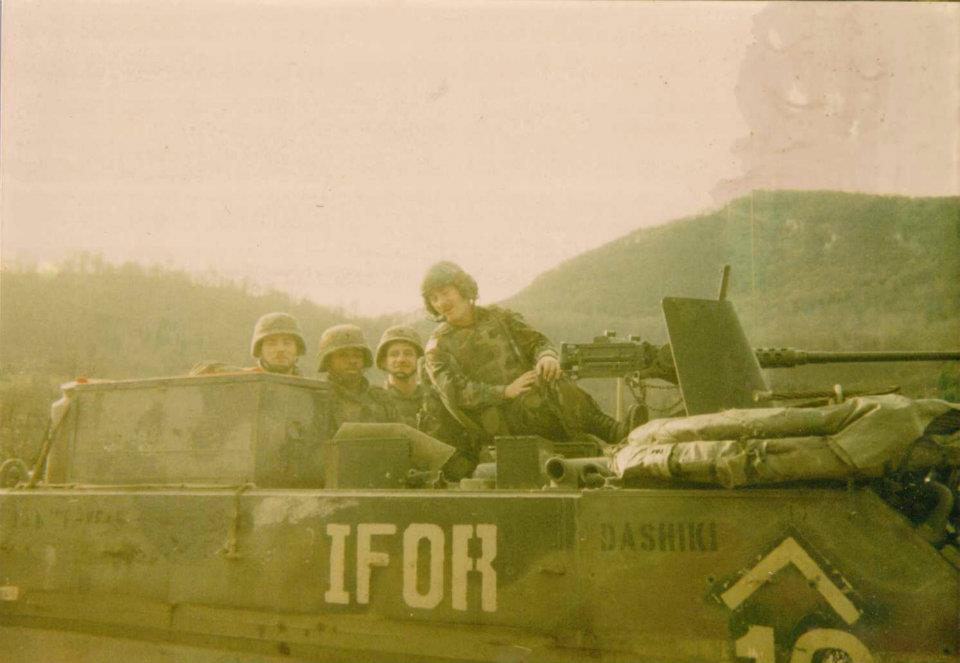
9th Engineer Battalion conducting a mine lifting mission in Bosnia, 1996.

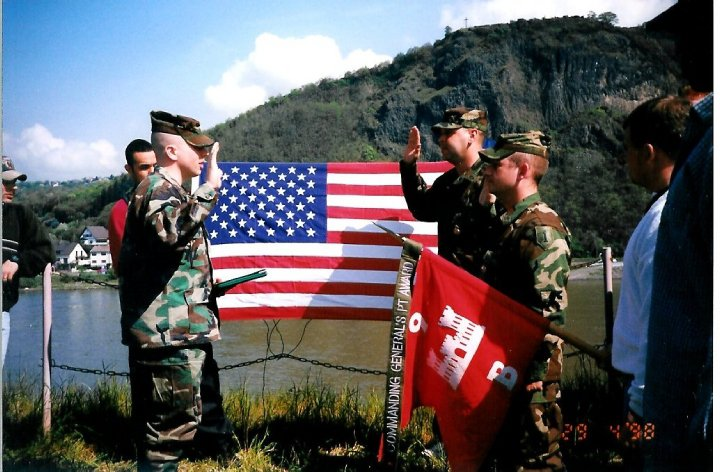
Edward Simon and George Spaulding from Bravo Company reenlistment at Ludendorff Bridge, 7 March 1998

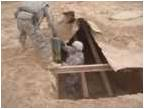
Bravo uncovers a Spider Hole Cache in Iraq 2009

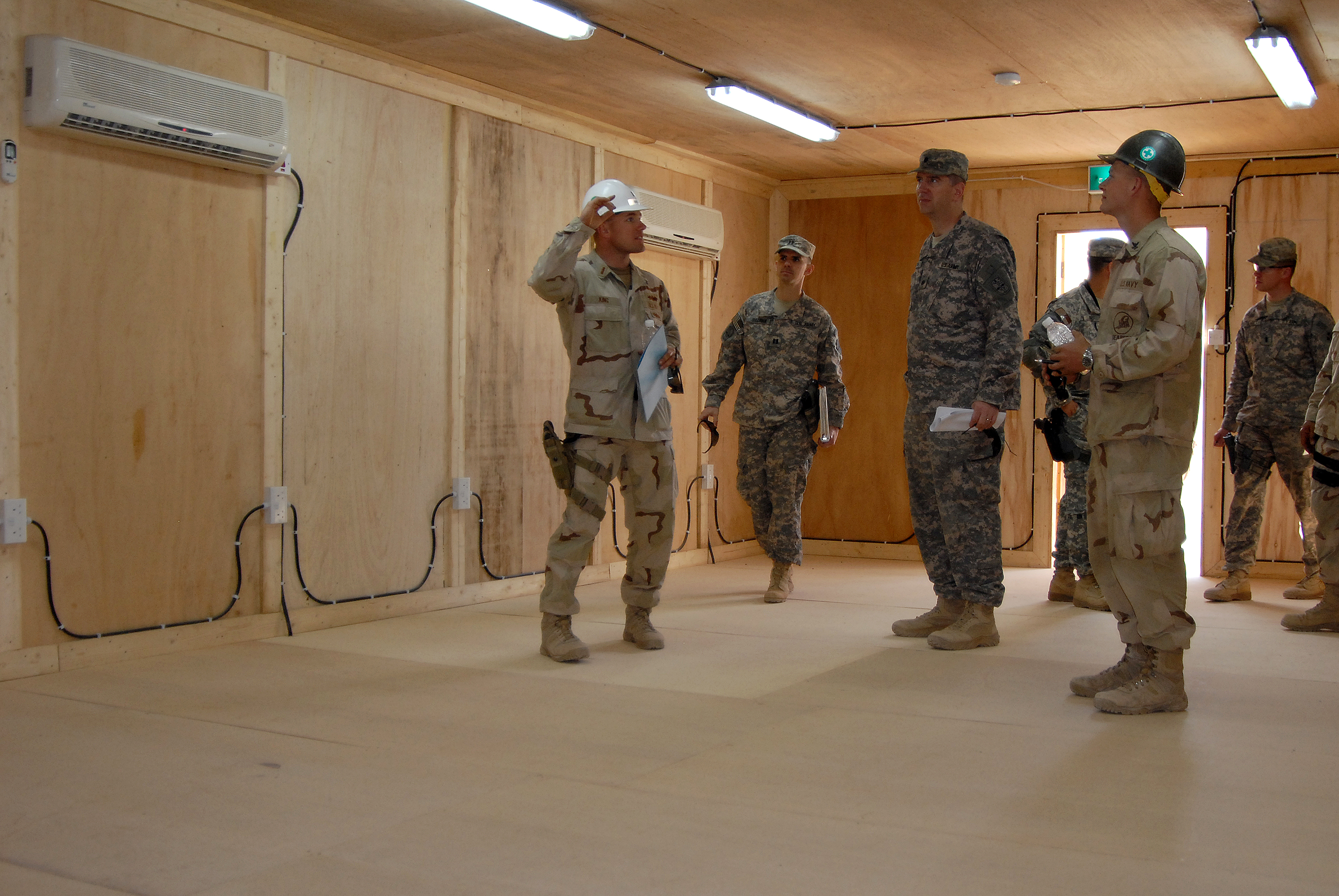
9E Commander on a completion of work tour at Patrol Base Mahawil, 2 March 2009, Iraq.

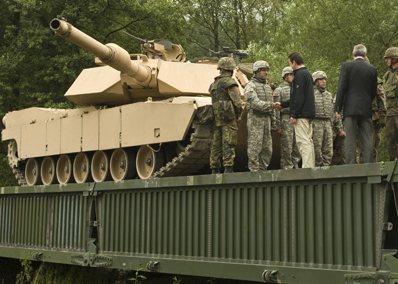
Soldiers of the 9th Engineer Battalion and the 701st Panzer Pioneer Battalion meet on a bridge constructed in Grafenwoehr during training, 24 August 2010.

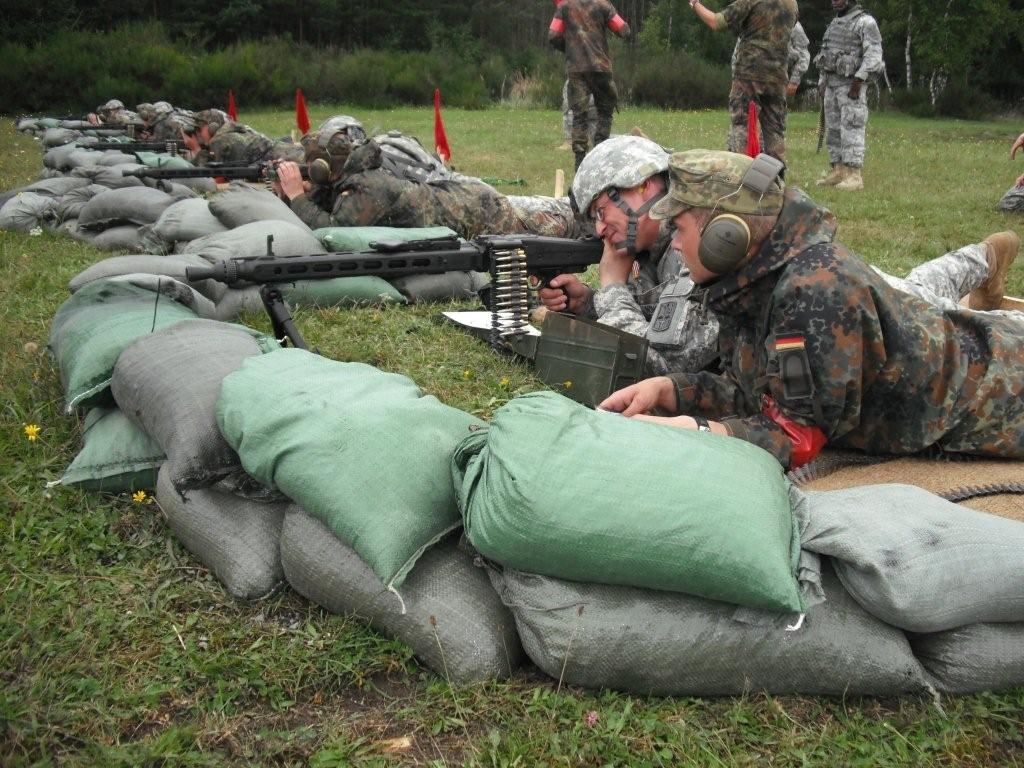
9th Engineer Battalion Training on the MG3 with the German Army, 2010.

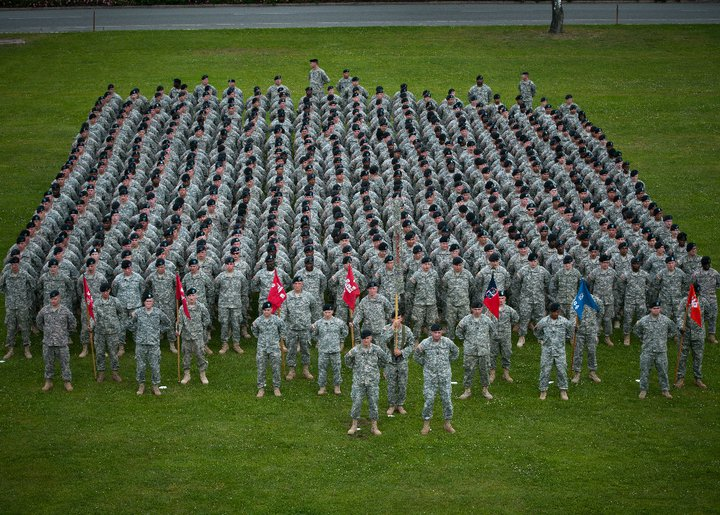
9th Engineer Battalion Casing of the Colors, Grafenwoehr, Germany, June 2011.

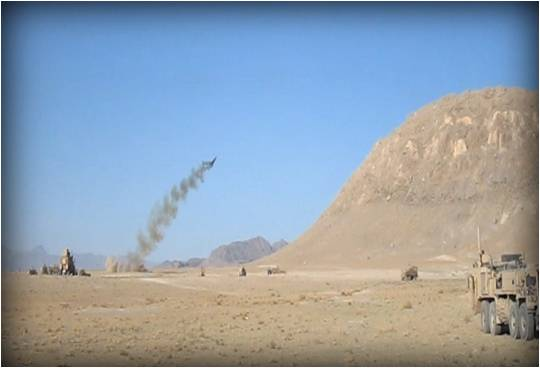
A Company, 9th Engineer Battalion, firing the MICLIC in training, Andar, Afghanistan 2011.

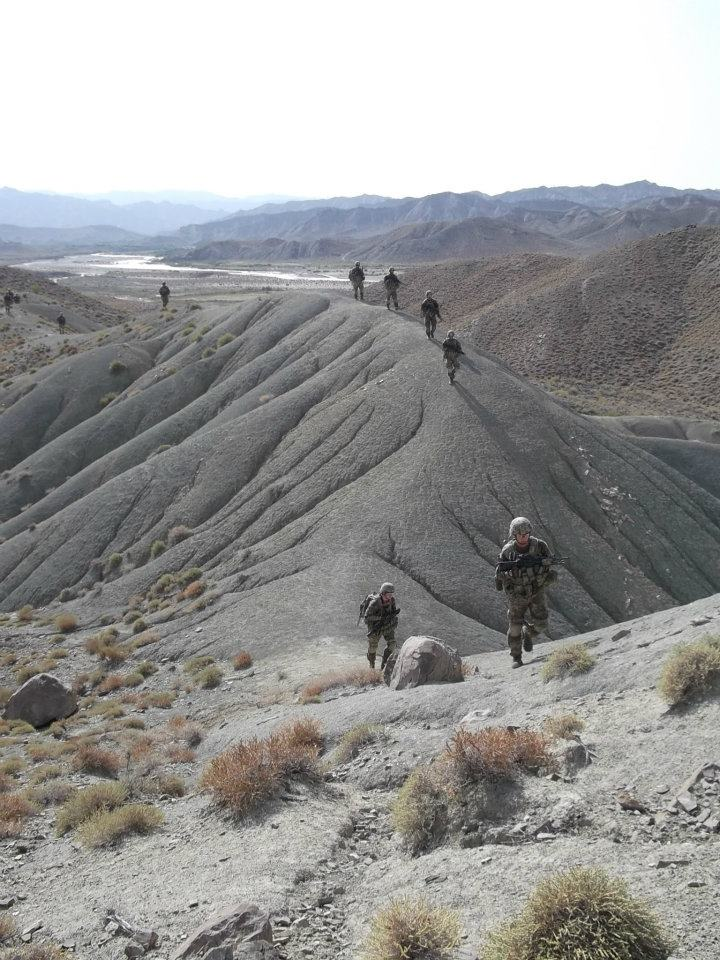
Bravo Company patrols in Gomal, Paktika 2011.

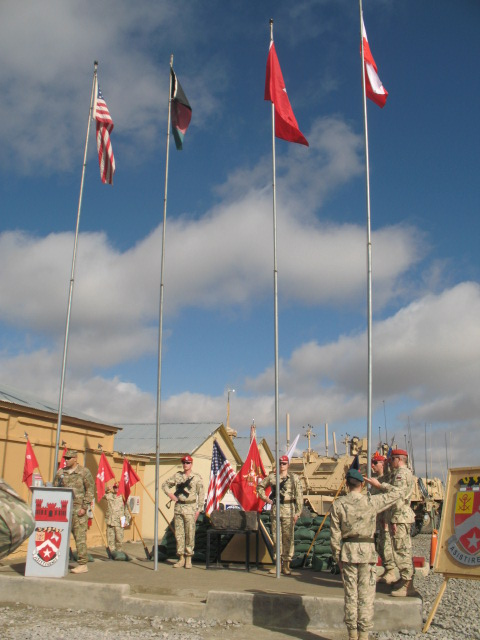
9th Engineer Battalion, Commemorating Polish Independence Day with Polish Soldiers, FOB Rushmore, Afghanistan, 11 November 2011.

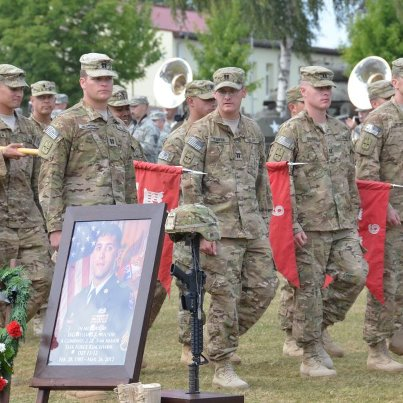
9th Engineer Battalion Redeployment Ceremony, Grafenwoehr, June 2012.

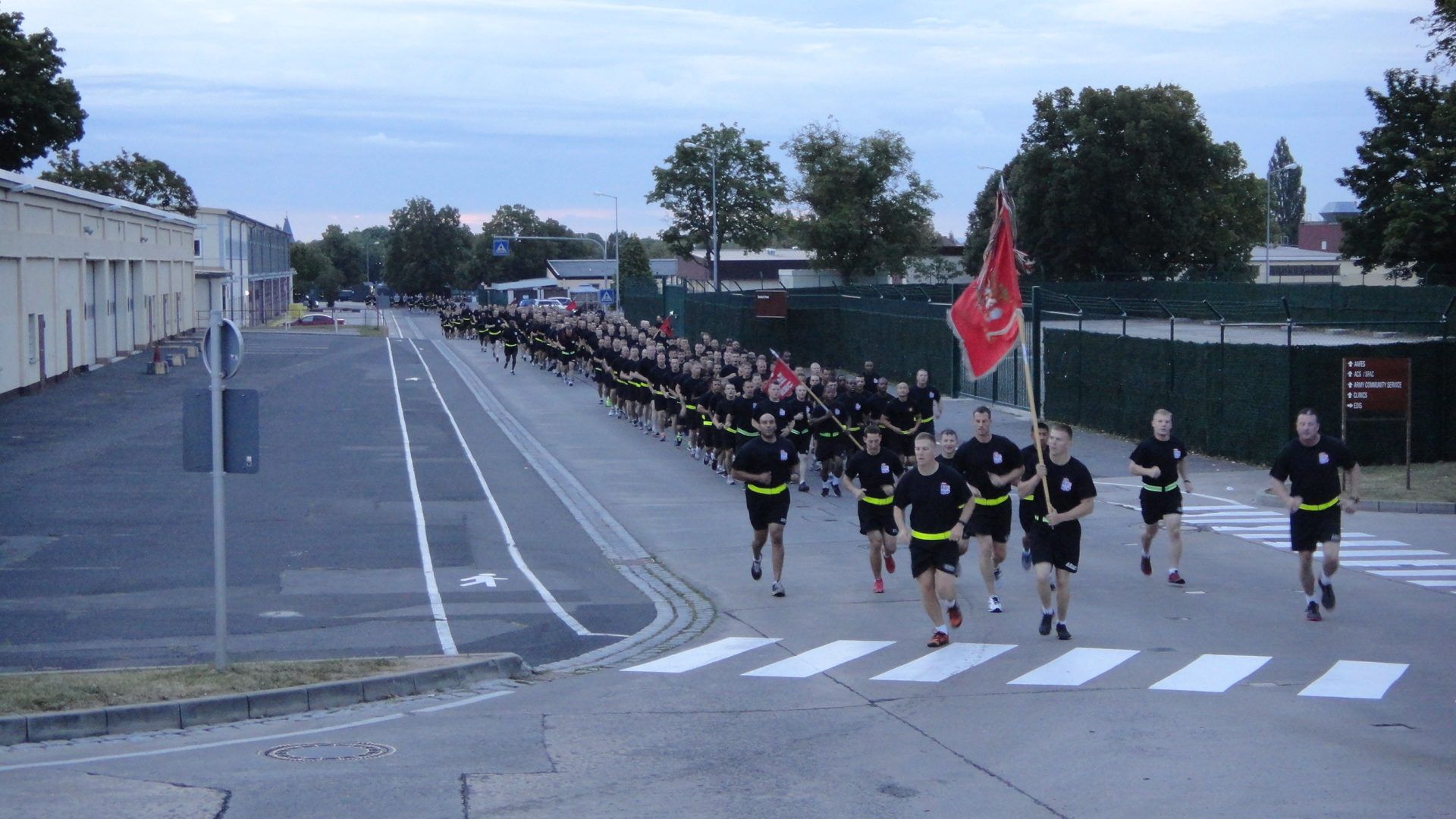
9th Engineer Battalion, Battalion Run, Schweinfurt, Germany, June 2012.

== See also ==
- Military engineering of the United States
- Combat engineer
- Military engineering

== References and notes ==
=== Bibliography ===
- Barker, H. Scott; Land, Charles R. (1999). Just A Job!: History of the 9th Engineer Battalion. Print Projects Books. ISBN 0-9675545-2-7.
