= 57th Signal Company (United States) =

Company of the U.S. Army

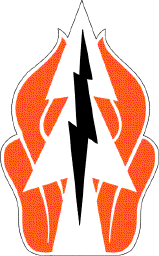
Unit logo

Formed in 1947, the 57th Signal Company is an independent communications company of the U.S. Army. The 57th Signal Company has deployed to Iraq, Alaska, Korea, and Vietnam. Germany is the company's headquarters.

== History ==
Constituted on 4 December 1943, in the US Army as the 311th Signal Service Battalion, it was activated on 27 December 1943 at Fort Monmouth, New Jersey. It was redesignated the 77th Signal Service Battalion on 18 June 1947. On 20 October 1947, it was reorganized and redesignated as the 57th Signal Service Company. It was inactivated in Germany, on 5 March 1949. It was redesignated on 5 February 1953 as the 57th Signal Support Company. On 12 March 1953, it was reactivated in Korea. On 15 April 1954 it was reorganized and redesignated as the 57th Signal Company.

In June 1992, the 57th Signal Company was reactivated from the with equipment and personnel from the 11th Signal Battalion inactivation and moved to Larson Barracks, Kitzingen Germany. The company was assigned to 17th Signal Battalion, 22nd Signal Brigade. The 57th was a 3 node MSE company with 203 Soldiers assigned, supporting NATO missions. The 57th Signal was inactivated on 30 September 1994.

The 57th Signal Company was reactivated in Schweinfurt on 16 February 2006 by redesignation of Company A, 121st Signal Battalion. The 57th Signal Company deployed with the 2nd Brigade Combat Team, 1st Infantry Division, in Operation Iraqi Freedom 5-6. The 57th Signal company employed the Joint Network Node equipment suite and is a model for the new signal support concept for "brigade units of action" (BUA). The 57th Signal Company currently supports the 172nd Infantry Brigade Combat Team (Separate).
