= 88mm =

88mm is a gun caliber which may refer to any of the following:

- 8.8 cm Flak 18/36/37/41, German anti-aircraft gun
- 8.8 cm Pak 43, German anti-tank gun
- 8.8 cm KwK 36, German tank gun
- 8.8 cm KwK 43, German tank gun
