= 8.8 cm Flak 16 =

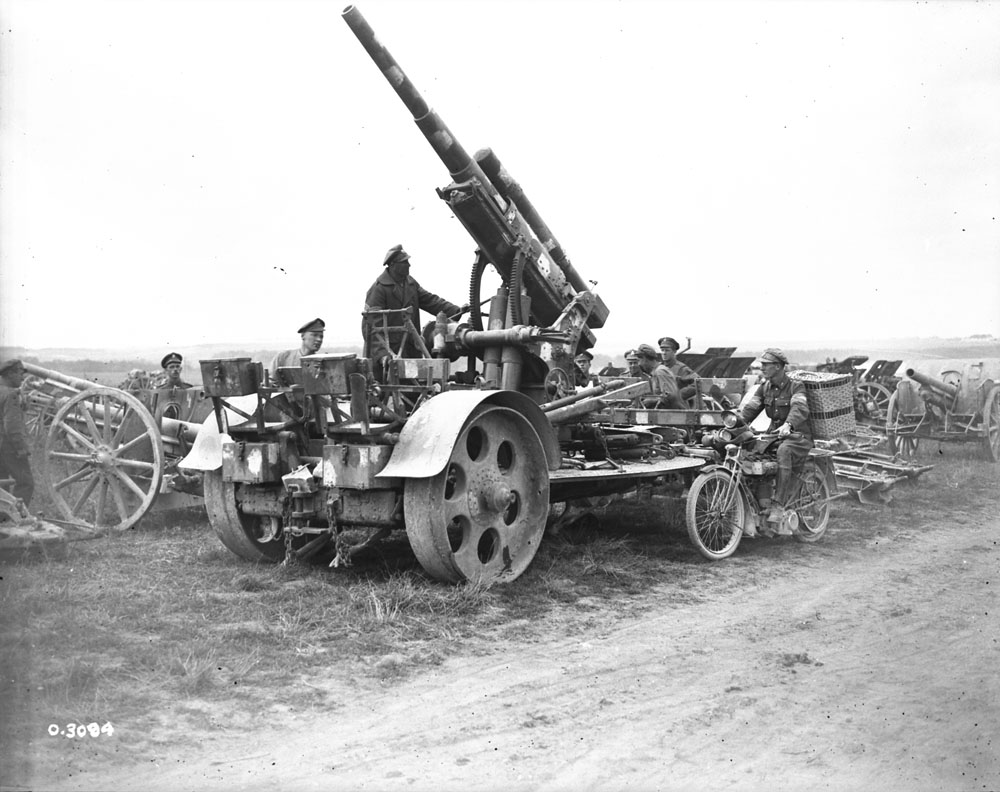
- 8.8 cm Flak 16 cannon
- Type: Anti-aircraft gun
- Place of origin: German Empire

Service history
- In service: 1917–1918
- Used by: German Empire
- Wars: World War I

Production history
- Designer: Krupp
- Designed: 1916
- Manufacturer: Krupp
- No. built: 169
- Variants: Flak 17, 18

Specifications
- Mass: Transport: 7,300 kg (16,100 lb); Combat: 3,100 kg (6,800 lb)
- Barrel length: 3.9 m (12 ft 10 in) L/45
- Shell: Fixed QF
- Shell weight: 9.4 kg (20 lb 12 oz)
- Caliber: 88 mm (3.46 in)
- Breech: Horizontal sliding-block
- Recoil: Hydro-pneumatic
- Carriage: Four-wheeled cruciform outriggers
- Elevation: -4° to +70°
- Traverse: 360°
- Rate of fire: 10 rpm
- Muzzle velocity: 785 m/s (2,575 ft/s)
- Maximum firing range: Horizontal: 10.8 km (6.7 mi); Vertical: 6,850 m (22,470 ft)

The 8.8 cm Flak 16 was a German 8.8 cm anti-aircraft gun from World War I, forerunner of the 8,8 cm FlaK/PaK Flak 18/36/37 of World War II. Its contemporary name was the 8,8 cm K.Zugflak L/45.

== Development ==
Designs for dedicated anti-aircraft guns existed before World War I, but few were in service by the outbreak of war. Early anti-aircraft artillery guns used in World War I were primarily adaptations of existing medium-caliber weapons, mounted to enable fire at higher angles. By 1915, the German military command realized that these were useless for anything beyond deterrence, even against vulnerable balloons and slow-moving aircraft. With the increase of aircraft performance, many armies developed dedicated AA guns with a high muzzle velocity – allowing the projectiles to reach greater altitudes. The first such German gun, the Flak 16, was introduced in 1917, using the 88 mm caliber, common in the Kaiserliche Marine.

== Design ==
The barrel for the 8.8 cm K.Zugflak L/45 was built from steel and was 45 calibers in length. The gun had a semi-automatic Krupp horizontal sliding-wedge breech to boost its rate of fire. There was a hydro-pneumatic recoil system located above and below the barrel, along with an equilibriator to balance the gun. The gun was capable of 360° of traverse and -4° to +70° of elevation.

== See also ==
- 7.7 cm Leichte Kraftwagengeschütze M1914

== Photo Gallery ==
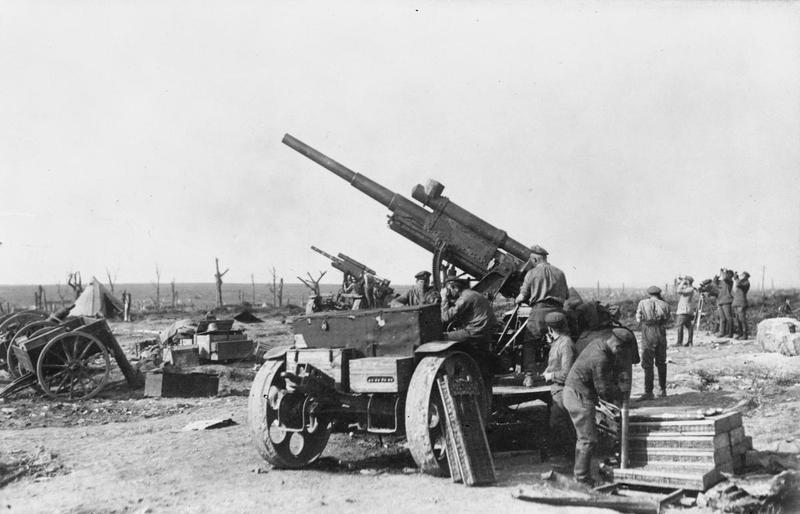

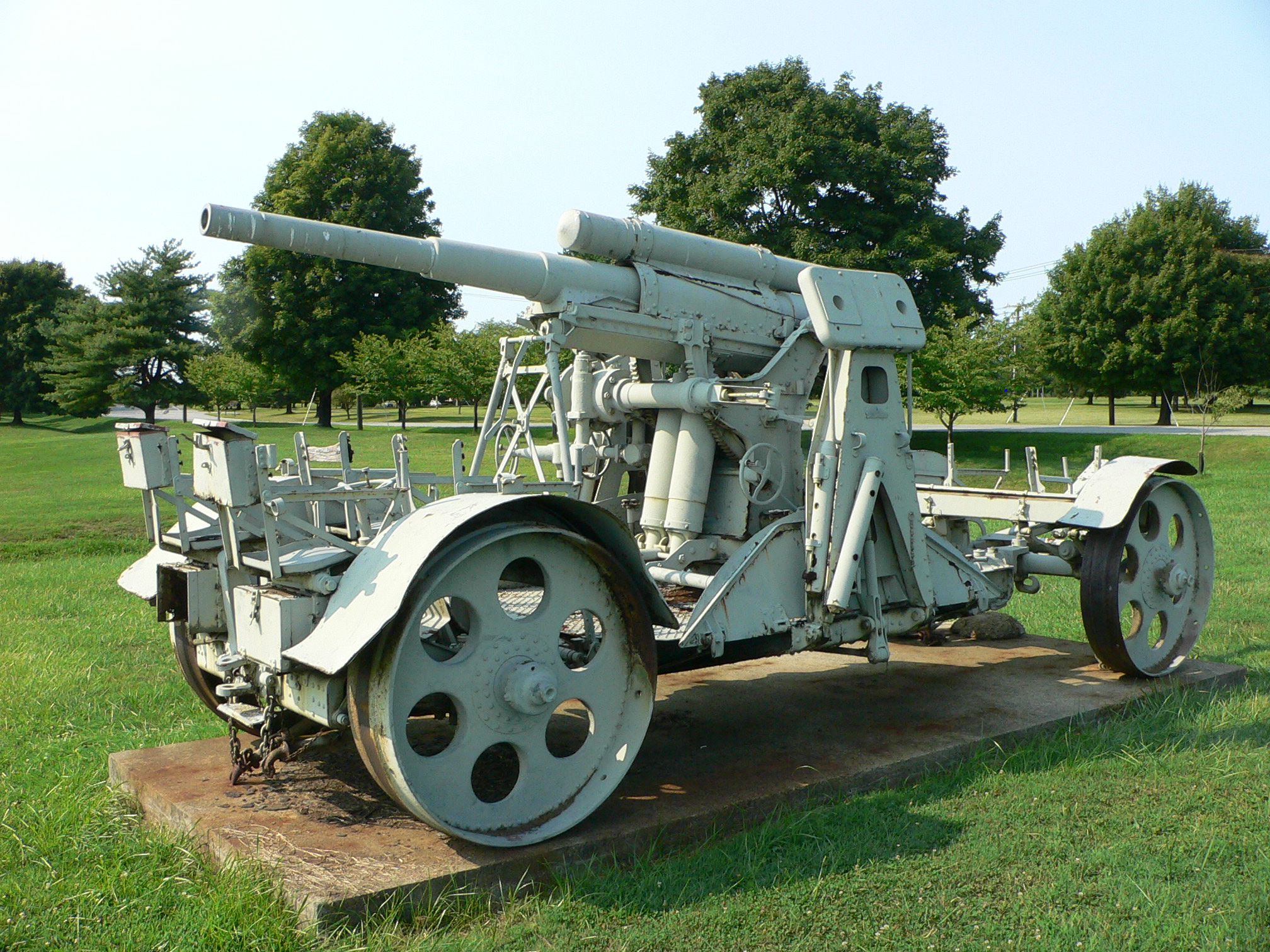

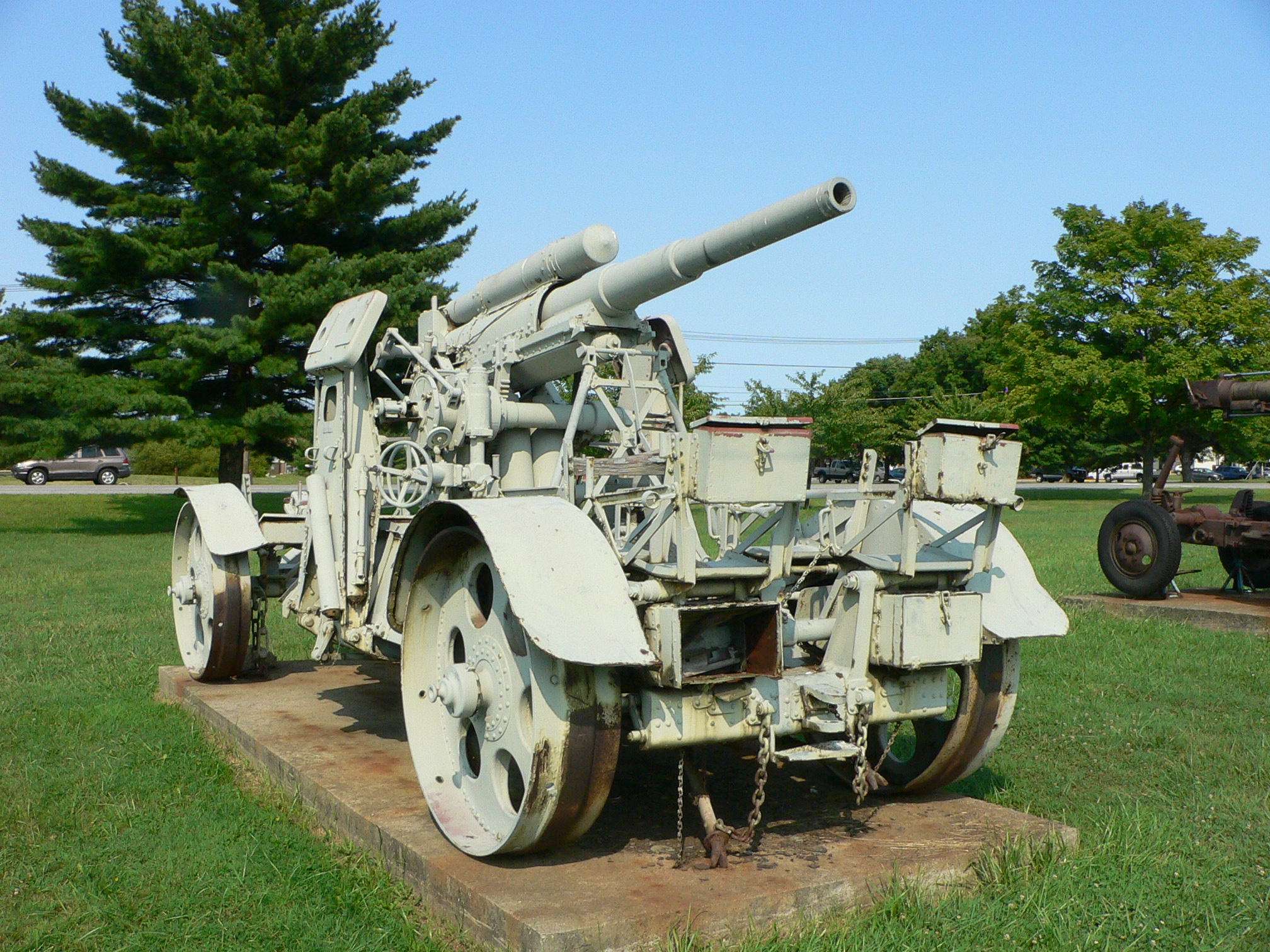
