= 8.8 cm Flak 18/36/37/41 =

German anti-aircraft gun

8.8 cm Flak 18-36
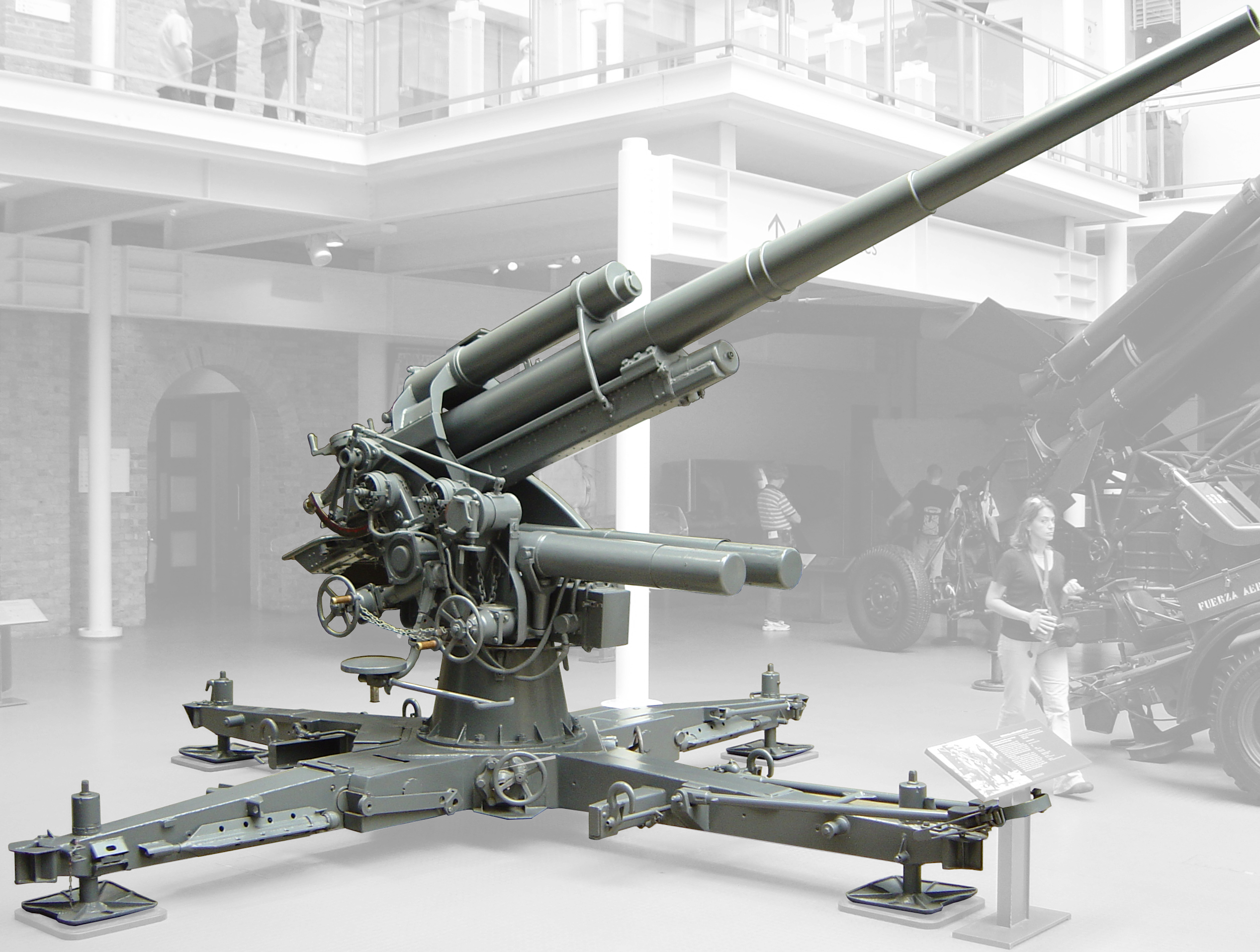
- 8.8 cm Flak 36 with Flak Rohr 18 barrel at the Imperial War Museum in London
- Type: Anti-aircraft gun
- Place of origin: Germany

Service history
- In service: 1936–1945 (Germany)
- Wars: Spanish Civil War; Second Sino-Japanese War; World War II; Vietnam War

Production history
- Designer: Krupp
- Designed: 1928
- Manufacturer: Krupp, Rheinmetall
- Unit cost: 33,600 ℛ︁ℳ︁
- Produced: 1933–1945
- No. built: 21,310

Specifications (Flak 36)
- Mass: 7,407 kg (16,330 lb) in mounted position
- Length: 5.791 m (20 ft)
- Barrel length: 4.938 m (16 ft 2 in) (56 calibers)
- Width: 2.3 m (7 ft 7 in)
- Height: 2.10 m (6 ft 11 in) (firing)
- Crew: 10
- Shell: Fixed QF 88×571mmR
- Caliber: 88 mm (3.46 in)
- Barrels: One, 32 grooves with right-hand increasing twist from 1/45 to 1/30
- Breech: Horizontal semi-automatic sliding block
- Recoil: Hydro-pneumatic
- Carriage: Sonderanhänger 201 (Flak 18) and Sonderanhänger 202 (Flak 36, 37, 41)
- Elevation: −3° to +85°
- Traverse: 360°
- Rate of fire: 15–20 rpm
- Muzzle velocity: 820 m/s (2,690 ft/s)
- Effective firing range: 14,860 m (16,250 yd) ground target; 8,000 m (26,000 ft) effective ceiling
- Maximum firing range: 9,900 m (32,500 ft) maximum ceiling
- Sights: ZF.20

The 8.8 cm Flak 18/36/37/41 is a German 88 mm anti-aircraft and anti-tank artillery gun, developed in the 1930s. It was widely used by Nazi Germany throughout World War II and is one of the most recognized German weapons of the conflict. The gun was universally known as the Acht-acht ("eight-eight") by the Germans and the "eighty-eight" by the Allies. (Note: The Allied slang for anti-aircraft fire, ack-ack, does not come from the Acht-acht, but is World War I signalers' phonetic spelling of letters "AA".) Due to its lethality, especially as a tank killer, the eighty-eight was greatly feared by Allied soldiers.

Development of the original model led to a wide variety of guns. The name of the gun applies to a series of related guns, the first one officially called the 8.8 cm Flak 18, the improved 8.8 cm Flak 36, and later the 8.8 cm Flak 37. (Note: In German, the comma is used as the decimal separator, hence official punctuation was actually "8,8 cm" and not "8.8 cm". The spoken version was Acht-komma-acht Zentimeter.) Flak is a contraction of German Flugabwehrkanone (also referred to as Fliegerabwehrkanone) (Note: Also many sources say Flak is a contraction of Flugabwehrkanone or Fliegerabwehrkanone or Flugzeug-Abwehr-Kanone. In all cases, including the latter, the letter "k" in "Flak" was not capitalized, as it did not signify an abbreviation of the German word Kanone.) meaning "aircraft-defense cannon", the original purpose of the weapon. In English, "flak" became a generic term for ground anti-aircraft fire. Air defense units were usually deployed with either a Kommandogerät ("command device") fire control computer or a portable Würzburg radar, which were responsible for its high level of accuracy against aircraft.

The versatile carriage allowed the 8.8 cm Flak to be fired in a limited anti-tank mode when still on its wheels; it could be completely emplaced in only two and a half minutes. Its successful use as an improvised anti-tank gun led to the development of a tank gun based upon it: the 8.8 cm KwK 36, with the "KwK" abbreviation standing for Kampfwagen-Kanone (literally "battle vehicle cannon", or "fighting vehicle cannon"), meant to be placed in a gun turret as the tank's primary armament. This gun served as the main armament of the Tiger I heavy tank.

In addition to these Krupp designs, Rheinmetall later created a more powerful anti-aircraft gun, the 8.8 cm Flak 41, which was produced in relatively small numbers. Krupp responded with another prototype of the long-barreled 8.8 cm gun, which was further developed into the anti-tank and tank destroyer 8.8 cm PaK 43 gun used for the Elefant and Jagdpanther, and turret-mounted 8.8 cm KwK 43 heavy tank gun of the Tiger II.

== Development history ==
=== Background ===
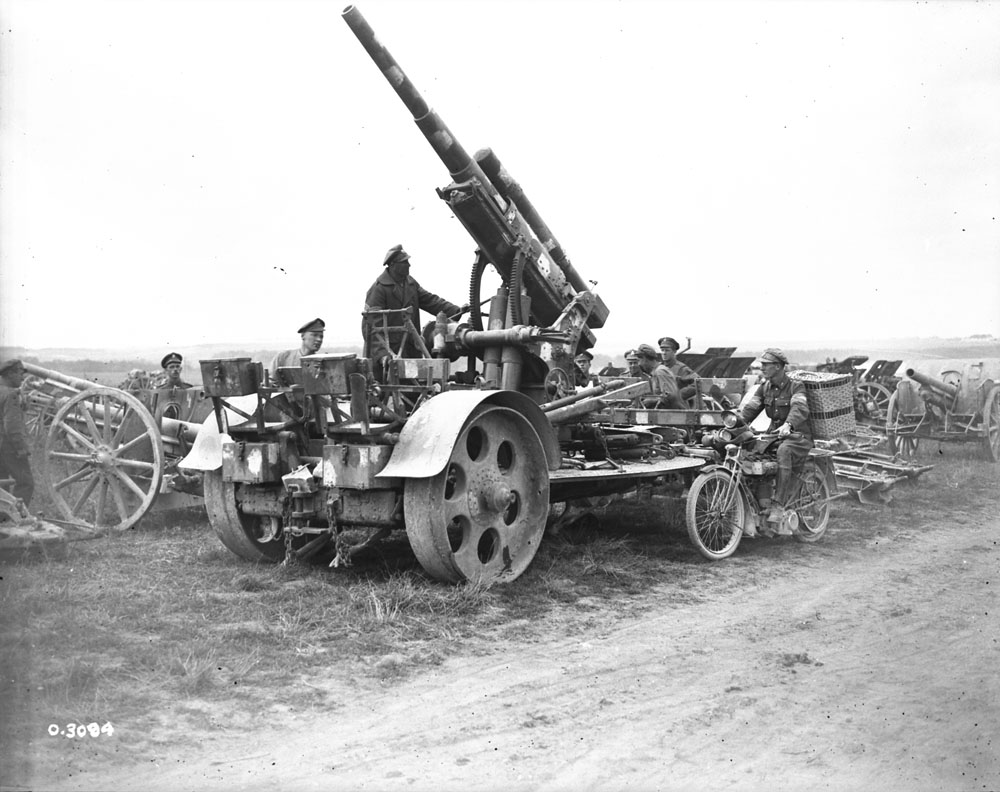
World War I British Empire troops with a captured, German 8.8 cm Flak 16 anti-aircraft cannon, August 1918

Initially, anti-aircraft artillery guns of World War I were adaptations of existing medium-caliber weapons, mounted to allow fire at higher angles. By 1915, the German command realized that these were useless for anything beyond deterrence, even against the vulnerable balloons and slow-moving aircraft of the period. With the increase of aircraft performance, many armies developed dedicated AA guns with a high muzzle velocity – allowing the projectiles to reach greater altitudes. It was this muzzle velocity, combined with a projectile of high weight, that made the 8.8 cm Flak one of the great World War II anti-tank guns. The first such German gun was introduced in 1917, using the 8.8 cm caliber common in the Kaiserliche Marine (navy).

After losing the war, Germany had been forbidden under the terms of the Treaty of Versailles from procuring new weapons of most types. Nevertheless, the Krupp company started the development of a new gun together with Bofors of Sweden. Krupp had the majority ownership in Bofors since 1921. The original design was a 75 mm model 1929. During the prototype phase, the army asked for a gun with considerably greater capability. The designers started again, using 88 mm caliber.

Prototype 88s were first produced in 1928. This early model, the Flak 18, used a single-piece barrel with a length of 56 calibers, leading to the commonly seen designation L/56.

=== First generation: Flak 18, 36 and 37 ===
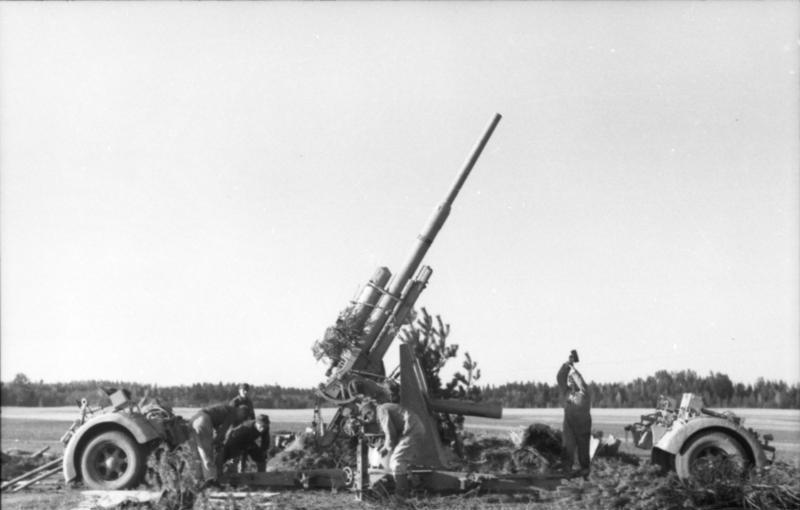
8.8cm Flak 36 being emplaced, with both bogies already detached

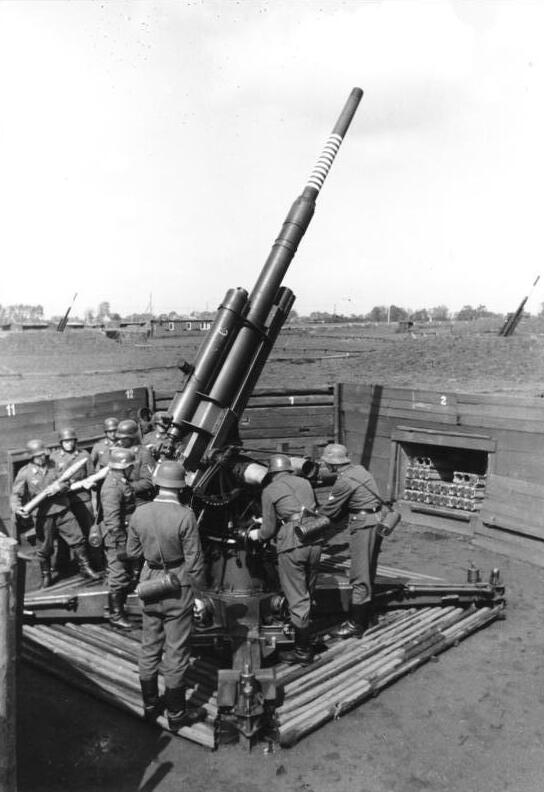
German 88 mm flak gun in action against Allied bombers

The Flak 18 was mounted on a cruciform gun carriage. A simple-to-operate "semi-automatic" loading system ejected fired shells, allowing it to be reloaded by simply inserting a new shell into a tray. The gun would then fire and recoil; during the return stroke, the empty case would be thrown backward by levers, after which a cam would engage and recock the gun. This resulted in firing rates of 15 to 20 rounds a minute, which was better than similar weapons of the era. High explosive ammunition was used against aircraft and personnel, and armour-piercing against tanks and other armored vehicles.

Widespread production started with the Nazi rise to power in 1933, and the Flak 18 was available in small numbers when Germany intervened in the Spanish Civil War. It quickly proved to be the best anti-aircraft weapon then available. The flak detachment with 88s proved accurate and versatile in combat against mainly land targets, the high muzzle velocity and large caliber making it an excellent long-range anti-vehicle and anti-bunker weapon. This experience also demonstrated a number of minor problems and potential improvement opportunities.

The Flak 18's carriage allowed it to fire in an emergency when still on its wheels and without its outriggers, but with a very limited traverse and elevation. For normal emplacement, one single-axle bogie was detached from the front outrigger and one from the rear, side outriggers were then hinged from the vertical position to the ground; the total time to set up was estimated at two and a half minutes. Both modes of operation made the gun much more suitable for fast-moving operations, the basic concept of the blitzkrieg. The weight of the gun meant that only large vehicles could move it, the Sd.Kfz. 7 half-track becoming a common prime mover.

Targeting indicators were attached to the central controller to each of the four guns of a battery, allowing for coordinated fire. Indeed, with the automatic loading system, the gun layer's job was to keep the gun barrel trained on the target area based on the signals from the controller. The loaders would keep the weapon fed with live ammunition which would fire immediately upon insertion – all while the gun layer aimed the weapon according to the data.

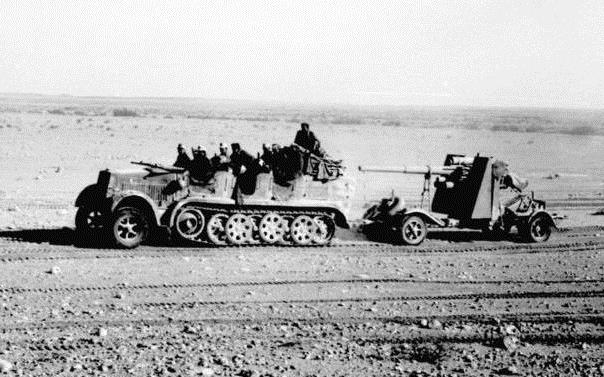
North Africa, 8.8cm Flak 18 towed behind a Sd.Kfz. 7, with its side outriggers lifted for transport visible behind the gun shield

Many of these improvements were incorporated into the Flak 36, the main difference being the introduction of a new cruciform carriage, the Lafette 36. This differed from the earlier Lafette 18 in that it was a symmetrical design and used with the SdAnh 202 bogies, each with four wheels. The Lafette 18 used the SdAnh 201 bogies which had two wheels for the forward bogie and four for the rear bogie. About this same time, the barrel was changed to the two-piece Flakrohr 36 for easier replacement of worn liners. Flak 36s were often fitted with an armoured shield that provided limited protection for the gunners. These shields could be retro-fitted onto older Flak 18s as well.

The later model was the Flak 37, which included updated instrumentation to allow the gun layers to follow directions from the single director more easily. In some sources it is mistakenly stated that the Flak 37 was not equipped for anti-armor operation. In fact all 8.8 cm Flak guns were capable of operation in the dual role.

The parts of the various versions of the guns were interchangeable, and it was not uncommon for various parts to be "mixed and matched" on a particular example.

Both Flak 18 and Flak 36 had the same permanently attached fuze setter with two "Zünderstellbecher". The Flak 37/41 had the simplified fuze setter of the 8.8 cm Flak 41.

=== Second generation: Flak 41 ===
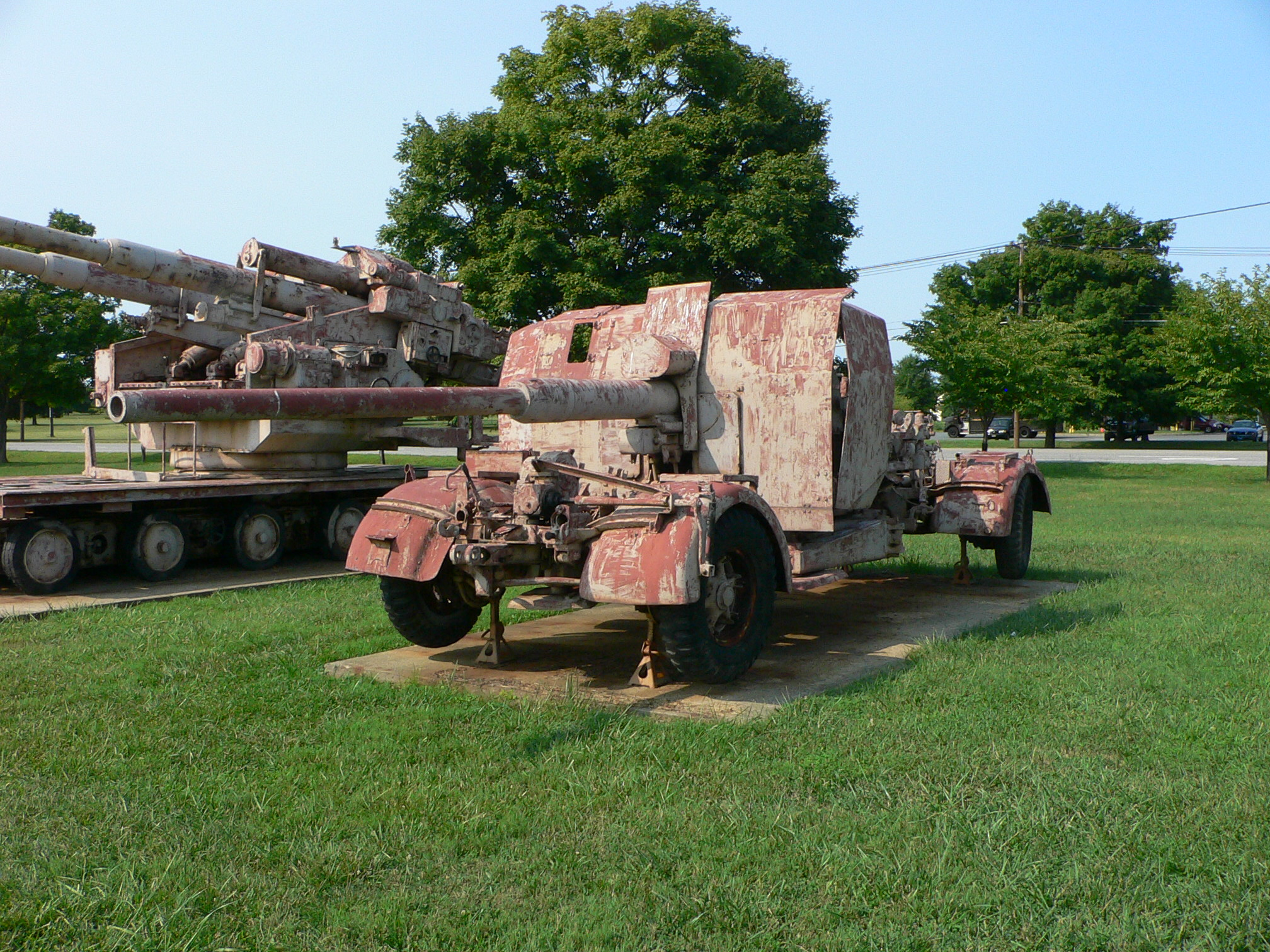
8.8 cm Flak 41 at US Army Ordnance Museum

As early as 1939 the Luftwaffe asked for newer weapons with even better performance, to address the problems of defending against attack by high-flying aircraft. Rheinmetall responded with a new 88 mm design with a longer cartridge and a longer barrel.

A prototype was ready in early 1941 leading to the designation 8.8 cm Flak 41. The new gun fired a 9.4-kilogram (20 lb) shell at a muzzle velocity of 1,000 m/s (3,280 ft/s), giving it an effective ceiling of 11,300 meters (37,100 ft) and a maximum of 14,700 meters (48,200 ft), which General der Flakartillerie Otto Wilhelm von Renz said to be "almost equal to the 128-mm." It featured a lower silhouette on its turntable mounting than did the 8.8 cm Flak 18/36/37 on its pedestal mounting. The barrel was at first a three-section one with a length of 74 calibers, and then redesigned to dual-section with a length of 72 calibers. Improvements in reloading raised the firing rate, with 20 to 25 rounds a minute being quoted.

Its combat debut was in North Africa where the first fifty were quickly introduced. Due to the harsh environment and teething problems with the new weapons system, they faced many problems. Later, the guns were almost exclusively used in Germany where they could be properly maintained and serviced. The Flak 41 had the disadvantage of complexity, and was prone to problems with ammunition, empty cases often jamming on extraction. Because of the high cost and complexity of this weapon, the Germans manufactured relatively few of them, 556 in all. The first deliveries were made in early 1943 and, as of August 1944, only 157 were fielded; with 318 in January 1945.

"Flak" (1944) de-classified official U.S. War-Department training film reel.

Given very low production numbers and ongoing problems with the Flak 41, attempts were made to install the Flak 41 barrel onto other guns' chassis. During 1942 tests were made using the Flak 41 barrel and Flak 37 chassis but these identified that the chassis could not take the strain even when strengthened. Work then continued using a Flak 37 barrel re-chambered for the Flak 41 round and with a muzzle brake. After other parts were strengthened this functioned as desired. The resulting piece was 74 calibers long (78 with the muzzle brake). Problems with the multi-part barrel construction of the Flak 37 were encountered and a new barrel based on the monoblock construction of the Flak 18 was designed. Production was cancelled after approximately only 13 units were built as the resources required to build these were similar to those needed to produce a true Flak 41 and those were simply no longer available at the time.

A further attempt was made to use a Flak 41 barrel on an existing mount from the 10.5 cm FlaK 39. The resulting unit outperformed the 105 mm original and was called the 8.8 cm Flak 39/41. However, production did not take place as no Flak 41 barrels were available.

== Production history ==
Thousands of 88 mm guns were produced throughout the war in various models and mounts.

Heavy flak production numbers
	pre-war	1939	1940	1941	1942	1943	1944	1945	Total
8.8 cm Flak 18/36/37	2,459	183	1,130	1,998	3,052	4,712	6,482	738	20,754
8.8 cm Flak 41	0	0	0	0	48	122	290	96?	556
10.5 cm Flak 38/39	?	38	290	509	701	1,220	1,331	92	more than 4,181
12.8 cm Flak 40 (including Flakzwilling 40/2)	0	0	0	0	65	298	664	98	1,125

Compared to other artillery types, German industry built for example, 570 heavy (caliber 88–128 mm) flak guns, 1,020 field artillery pieces (caliber 75–210 mm), and 1,300 tank guns, anti-tank guns, plus self-propelled guns in December 1943.

== Combat history ==
[American troops] knew that the greatest single weapon of the war, the atomic bomb excepted, was the German 88 mm flat-trajectory gun, which brought down thousands of bombers and tens of thousands of soldiers. The Allies had nothing as good, despite one of them designating itself the world's greatest industrial power.

— Paul Fussell, 1989

=== German use ===
The 88 mm was used in two main roles: as a mobile heavy anti-aircraft and as an anti-tank gun. Other uses included firing in support of the troops at the front and as a more static anti-aircraft gun for home defence.

==== Anti-aircraft defense of the Reich ====
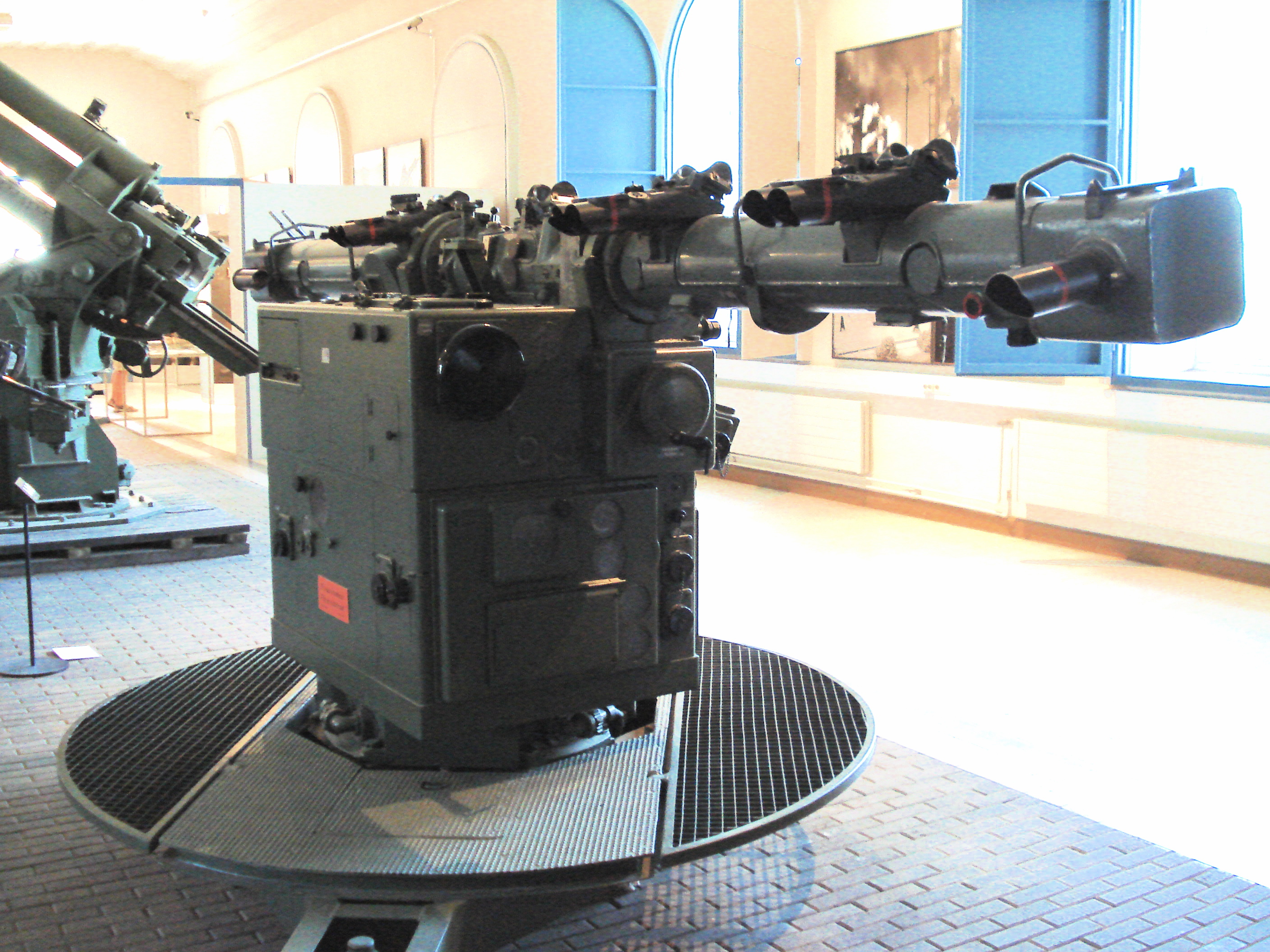
Kommandogerät 40, the rangefinder and mechanical analog computer for directing anti-aircraft guns, Manege Military Museum, Helsinki, Finland (2006)

After 1935, the anti-aircraft defense of Germany was controlled by the Luftwaffe. By the beginning of World War II the Luftwaffe's anti-aircraft artillery employed 6,700 light (2 cm and 3.7 cm) and 2,628 heavy flak guns. Of the latter, a small number were 10.5 cm Flak 38s or 39s, the majority were 8.8 cm Flak 18s, 36s or 37s. This was twice as many heavy AA guns as RAF Fighter Command had at the time, with France and the United States having even fewer.

Throughout the entire war, the majority of 88 mm guns were used in their original anti-aircraft role.

The guns were usually equipped with a Kommandogerät system, which was an analog gunnery computer. The Kommandogerät systems were introduced starting in 1925, and the Kommandogerät p40 was the standard system during the majority of the war. It allowed extremely precise fire, and would even take into account how far away the guns were from one another and the aiming crew, cancelling out the offset and aiming all weapons at the same point. This allowed multiple guns to be aimed precisely at the same target by a single command crew of five men, instead of requiring trained crews on each gun.

Radar aiming systems were also developed to complement these systems. The Würzburg radar series of radars was produced in the thousands and used widely. It allowed general area fire without line of sight, but had poor accuracy compared to the visual systems. This resulted in the Giant Würzburg, which had sufficient accuracy to precisely control guns without direct visual contact.

The financial costs associated with anti-aircraft cannon were substantial, especially when compared with fighter aircraft. For example, in January 1943 – at a time when Germany was desperately fighting to regain the strategic initiative in the East and was also facing a heavy bombing campaign in the West – expenditures on anti-aircraft defenses were 39 million ℛ︁ℳ︁, whereas all the remaining weapons and munitions production amounted to 93 million ℛ︁ℳ︁ (including 20 million ℛ︁ℳ︁ of the navy budget and only nine million of the aircraft-related budget).

By August 1944, there were 10,704 Flak 18, 36 and 37 guns in service, now complemented also by the 10.5 cm Flak 38 and 39, and the formidable 12.8 cm Flak 40, owing to the increase in US and British bombing raids during 1943 and 1944.

==== Support of ground troops ====
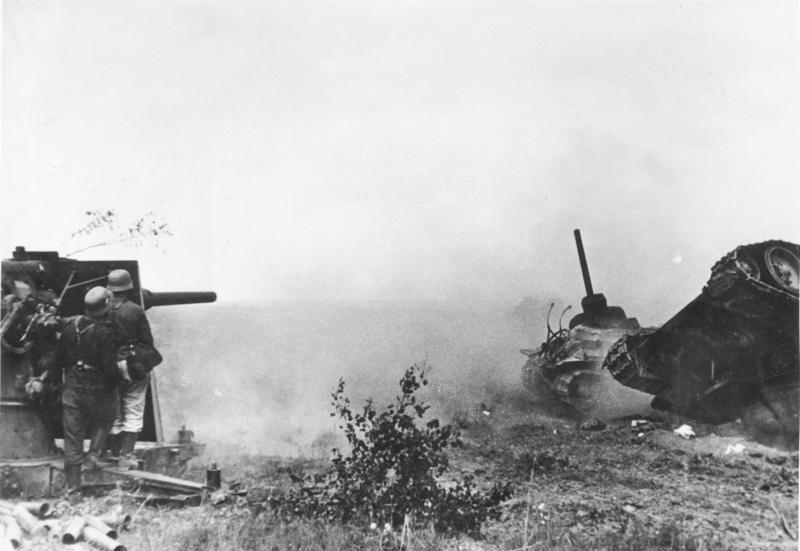
An 88 mm gun in a direct fire role, USSR, 1942

The 8.8 cm Flak performed well in its original role of an anti-aircraft gun and it proved to be a superb anti-tank gun as well. An American tanker who survived losing three tanks wrote to Chrysler after V-E Day that "an 88 sure makes quick work of them. They go through them just like they were a piece of paper". Its success was due to its versatility: the standard anti-aircraft platform allowed gunners to depress the muzzle below the horizontal, unlike most of its contemporaries. As the war progressed, it was becoming increasingly clear that existing anti-tank weapons were unable to pierce the armor of heavier enemy tanks and ground commanders began increasingly to use the 8.8 cm Flak against tanks.

Similarly to the anti-aircraft role, as an anti-tank weapon the 8.8 cm Flak was tactically arranged into batteries, usually four guns to each. The higher-level tactical unit was usually a mixed anti-aircraft battalion (gemischte Flak-Abteilung). (Note: The light anti-aircraft battalion usually did not deploy any 8.8 cm Flaks, the heavy battalions were rarely used in practice.) It totaled 12 such guns on average, supplemented by light guns.

The German Condor Legion made extensive use of the 8.8 cm Flak 18 in the Spanish Civil War, where its usefulness as an anti-tank weapon and general artillery piece exceeded its role as an anti-aircraft gun. For the Battle of France in 1940, the army was supported by eighty-eights deployed in twenty-four mixed flak battalions. The 8.8 cm Flak was used against heavily armored tanks such as the Char B1 bis and Matilda II, whose frontal armour could not be penetrated by the standard 3.7 cm anti-tank gun. The 8.8 cm Flak was powerful enough to penetrate over 84 mm of armor at a range of 2 km, making it an unparalleled anti-tank weapon during the early days of the war and still formidable against all but the heaviest tanks at the end. Erwin Rommel's use of the gun to blunt the British counterattack at Arras ended any hope of a breakout from the encirclement of May 1940. In the entire Battle of France, the weapon destroyed 152 tanks and 151 bunkers. The Battle of France also saw the introduction of vehicle-mounted 8.8 cm Flak 18s, the so-called "Bunkerknacker" on the Sd.Kfz. 8 heavy tractor.

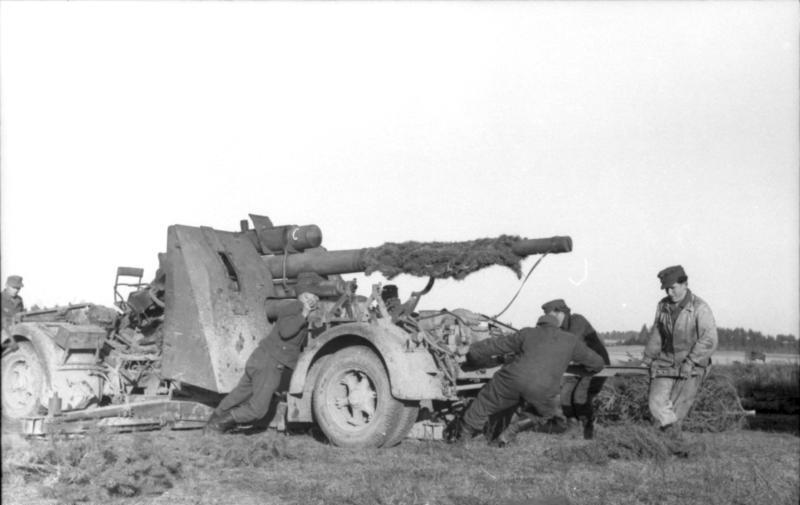
Manhandling an 88 on the Russian front

During the North African campaign, Rommel made the most effective use of the weapon, as he lured tanks of the British Eighth Army into traps by baiting them with apparently retreating German panzers. A mere two flak battalions destroyed 264 British tanks in 1941. Repeated high tank loss from well-placed 8.8 cm Flak guns in the battles of Halfaya Pass earned it the nickname "Hellfire Pass". Later in that theater, in the Battle of Faid in Tunisia, Rommel camouflaged many 8.8 cm Flaks (with additional 7.5 cm Pak 40s and 5 cm Pak 38s) in vegetation-filled areas. Inexperienced U.S. tankers and commanders rushed into a valley at Faid only to be obliterated. When the U.S. Army's M4 Sherman tanks pursued, concealed German guns picked them off at ranges far beyond those of their 75 mm guns.

For Operation Barbarossa, the invasion of the Soviet Union, Germany deployed the 8.8 cm Flak in 51 mixed AA battalions. They were mostly Luftwaffe-subordinated units attached to the Heer at corps or army level, with approximately one battalion per corps. The weapon saw continuous use on the eastern front. The appearance of the outstanding T-34 and the later KV tanks shocked the German panzer crews and anti-tank teams, who could only penetrate the Soviet tanks' armor at extremely close range on the order of 200 yards when using the standard 37 mm and 50 mm guns, while the Russian 76 mm gun was effective out to 1000 yards.

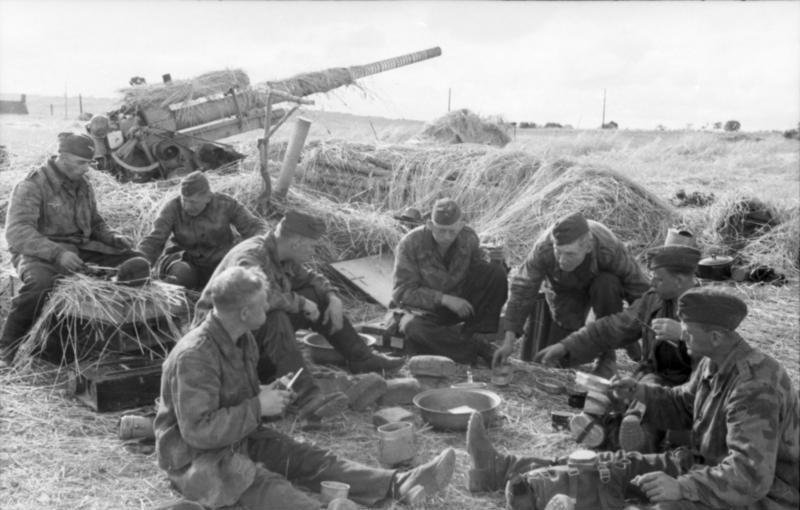
88 with crew, France, 1944

The 8.8 cm Flak in the anti-tank role was arguably most effective in the flat and open terrain of Libya, Egypt and the eastern front. The less open terrain in Italy and Northern France was less suitable for long-range anti-tank guns. The success of the German anti-tank weapons caused the Allies to take steps to defend against it in new tank designs. On July 18 and 19 1944 a Luftwaffe 8.8 cm anti-aircraft battery was re-purposed by then Major Hans von Luck to attack British tanks near Cagny taking part in Operation Goodwood. Twenty tanks were destroyed by these guns within the first few seconds and at least 40 tanks were knocked out by 8.8 cm Flaks during the engagement. Just as important, the success of the 8.8 cm Flaks spawned the development of dedicated 8.8 cm caliber Paks (see below) which were even more adept at anti-tank mission due to their lower silhouette design. By February 1945, there were 327 heavy anti-aircraft batteries facing the Red Army, which was 21 percent of those used for anti-aircraft defense.

==== Coastal defence ====
On 14 September 1942, Flak-Abt. I./43 (Major Wegener) employed these guns against a commando landing raid called Operation Agreement by the British Royal Navy near Tobruk. Between them, Italian 155 mm (6-inch) shore batteries and aerial attack, the destroyer HMS Sikh was so severely damaged that she sank while being towed by HMS Zulu.

=== Use by other armed forces ===
==== Italy ====
In June 1939 Italy had credits of about Lit.300 million with Germany for the sale of processed materials, therefore the Ministro della Guerra (Ministry of War) proposed that these credits be paid with the sale of 50 batteries of 8.8 Flak (88/55 in the Italian nomenclature), equal to 300 guns with relative ammunition. While the proposal was accepted in principle, the German authorities stated that they did not have that quantity of pieces available, so they paid off the debt in part with 8.8 cm Flak and partly with the 7.5 cm kanon (75/50 in the Italian name). In the proposal presented by the German authorities, the Italian supply of mechanical parts for anti-aircraft guns and anti-tank guns was also envisaged, so the production of components for artillery was started in the workshops Ansaldo in (Genoa and Pozzuoli) and OTO. The batteries were supplied complete with a Zeiss firing station Mod. 36 and related auxiliary equipment.

The batteries began arriving in Italy a few days after Italy entered the war, and were initially assigned in part to the Milizia Volontaria per la Sicurezza Nazionale (Voluntary Militia for National Security, MACA), for the protection of the Italian main cities and partly sent in Libya, for the protection of ports. Some groups were subsequently assigned to mobile motorcycle sections. However it was immediately evident that the Regio Esercito (Italian Royal Army) did not have at its disposal a tractor with characteristics suitable for towing this piece, given that the task was entrusted to Lancia 3Ro, without all-wheel drive. At the end of 1940, 44 pieces and relative firing stations were available. Starting from October 1942, several batteries, while remaining in German possession, were used by Italian personnel (officers and troops) for the protection of military infrastructures and cities, this practice was further intensified in 1943, reaching more than 100 batteries. In addition to the cannons that arrived for the canals established in 1940, in 1943, 24 pieces and their Sd.Kfz.7 tractors were transferred to Italy intended for equipping the 1ª Divisione corazzata "M" (1st Armored Division "M"). The 88/55 in the Regio Esercito was used in its natural role, that is, as an anti-aircraft weapon, its use as an anti-tank cannon was limited to the theaters of Northern Africa (Libya and Tunisia) and only for a few gruppi autocampali (self-transported field artillery groups).

==== China ====
In 1937, the Chinese Nationalist Government imported 20 Flak 18 guns and used them to defend the fortifications along the Yangtze River. The Flak 18s were extensively deployed during the all-aerial combat of the Battle of Chongqing and Chengdu.

==== Finland ====
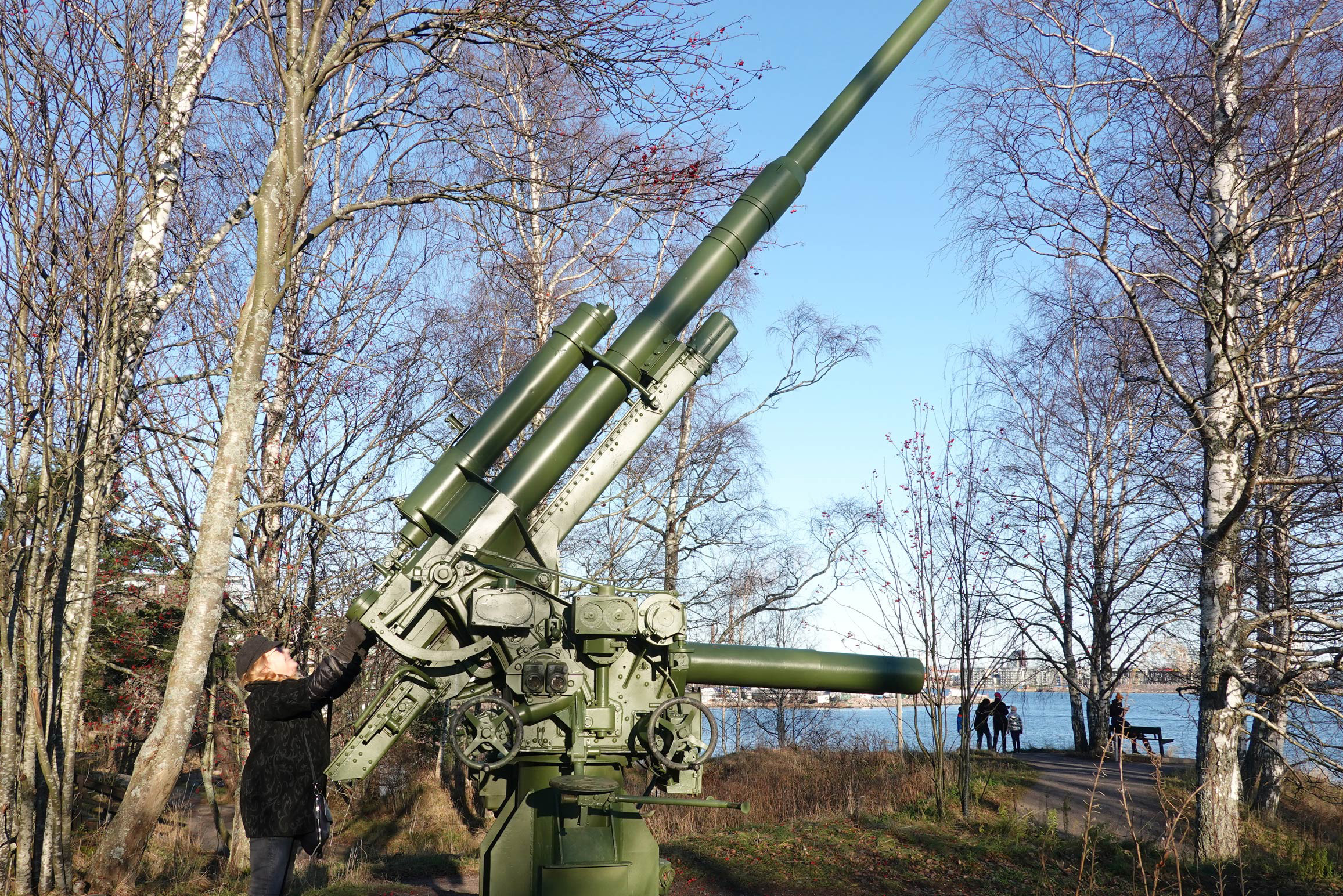
88mm Flak-37, Lauttasaari, Helsinki, Finland

In 1943–1944 Finland bought 90 8.8 cm FlaK 37 cannons from Germany and they were used for air defence of largest cities in Finland. These cannons played an important role against Soviet air raids in Helsinki in February 1944. After the war these cannons remained in Finnish use as AA-guns until 1977 and after that as coastal guns until the early 2000s. The gun had nickname Rämäpää ("Reckless") after the manufacturer's initials RMB. Several of the Finnish guns survive in museums and as memorials.

==== Spain ====
Four batteries (16 guns) of 88 mm guns (Flak 18) initially reached Spain as AA with the Condor Legion in 1936, but it was soon used as anti-tank, anti-bunker and even for counterbattery fire. More guns were sent later, and some 88 mm guns were also supplied to Spanish army units. At the end of the war the Spanish Army was using all of the Flak 18 guns sent, some 52 units.

Initially, the Flak 18 batteries were deployed to protect the airfields and logistics bases of the German Condor legion. The scarcity of artillery among the Nationalist forces and the general low proficiency of the Spanish gun crews forced the usage of the Flak 18 gun in a variety of roles, including as an artillery piece and as an anti-tank gun. Given appropriate ammunition it proved quite capable in both roles. The war in Spain, with its wildly fluctuating front lines and the presence of Russian tanks, forced the Germans to employ the Flak 18 guns in a direct fire mode against ground targets. By the end of the war the 88 mm guns had performed far more missions as an anti-tank and direct-fire Field Artillery gun than as an anti-aircraft gun. During the war German 88 mm guns were involved in 377 combat engagements, only 31 were against enemy aircraft. The use of the 88 mm in direct support of the infantry brought the gun crews in close proximity to the enemy and made the crews susceptible to infantry fire. Casualties among the legion's 88 mm gun batteries in the Spanish Civil War were second only to those among the bomber pilots.

In early 1937 in the fighting around Malaga, a battery of 88 mm guns was assigned to support an infantry brigade. Bad weather grounded the main bomber force, but the assault succeeded, mainly because of the concentrated and accurate fire of the supporting 88 mm guns. Flak 18 batteries were used by the nationalist army at the Battle of Ebro, both for direct fire against pillboxes and also for indirect fire in the advance towards Barcelona.

Following the Spanish Civil War, more Flak 36 models arrived in 1943 (88 guns 88/56 mm Flak-36) and since 1943 they were manufactured under license in Trubia under the denomination FT 44 (about 200 guns).

==== Allied ====
The Flak 36 guns were briefly issued in late 1944 to the American Seventh Army as captured weapons. The 79th Field Artillery Battalion (Provisional) was formed from personnel of the 79th and 179th Field Artillery Groups to fire captured German artillery pieces at the height of an ammunition shortage. Similarly, the 244th Field Artillery Battalion was temporarily equipped with a miscellany of captured German 88 mm guns and 105 mm and 150 mm howitzers. By December 31, 1944, the 244th Field Artillery Battalion had fired a total of 10,706 rounds through captured German weapons.

==== France ====
In March 1945, France equipped its 401st, 403rd and 407 Anti-Aircraft artillery regiment with captured German 8.8 guns, associated with British GL Mk. II and GL Mk. III radars. The guns remained in service with second-line units until 1953 and then were used for training for a few years.

==== Yugoslavia ====
During the Yugoslav wars in the 1990s, various Flak guns were used, mainly by the naval artillery of the Yugoslav People's Army (JNA). The Yugoslav Army (VJ) also used Flak carriages mounted with double 262 mm rocket launch tubes from the M-87 Orkan MLRS, instead of the 88 mm gun. It was capable of deploying cluster bombs, as well as anti-personnel and anti-tank mines, at up to 50 km. Only a few were built in mid-1993, the entire project was generally regarded as unsuccessful.

==== Greece ====
Greece had at least 24 guns (8.8) that were used against the Regia Aeronautica during the Italian invasion of Greece in 1940. Later these guns were used against the invading German forces in April 1941.

==== Vietnam ====
Beginning in 1954 the Democratic Republic of Vietnam received a number of Flak 88s from the Soviet Union. These cannons were used against US fighter jets in the early 60s.

== Comparison with similar anti-aircraft guns ==
The Flak 18/36/37 was roughly comparable to its Italian and Allied counterparts. As an anti-aircraft gun it fired a 9.2 kilogram (20 lb) shell at a muzzle velocity of 820 m/s to an effective ceiling of 8,000 meters, with a maximum ceiling of 9900 meters. While this was potent against US daylight raids, which generally flew at altitudes of 6,400 to 7,600 m (21,000 to 24,900 ft), some aircraft were able to fly higher than the gun's effective ceiling. Some flak batteries used guns worn out from firing beyond their operational lives, which typically limited their effective ceiling to 7,470 m (24,510 ft).

In comparison, the British QF 3.7-inch (94 mm) Mark III fired a 13 kg (29 lb) projectile at 790 m/s (2,600 ft/s) to an effective ceiling of 10,600 meters (34,800 ft), the American 90 mm M1 fired a 10 kg (22 lb) shell at 820 m/s (2,700 ft/s) to the same height, the Soviet 85 mm air defense gun M1939 (52-K) fired a 9.2 kg (20 lb) projectile at 792 m/s (2,598 ft/s) to an effective ceiling of 10,500 metres (34, 448 ft) and the Italian Cannone da 90/53 fired a 10.33 kg projectile at 830 m/s to an effective ceiling of 12,000 meters (39,000 ft). The Allied weapons' capabilities were augmented by the introduction of proximity fuzes. The Allies' and Italian weapons were heavier and less mobile, with the Allied weapons being almost useless for ground fire until numerous modifications were carried out.

While the US and Italian 90 mm were also used as anti-tank guns – the American gun being in use on their M36 tank destroyer and M26 Pershing heavy tank, the 85mm Soviet gun being fitted to the SU-85, later models of the T-34 and the stopgap KV-85 and IS-1 heavy tanks – their use was considerably more limited than the German 88 due to German tanks being primarily used defensively by 1944 and the Allies operating dedicated AT guns (both as mobile AT guns and tank cannons); such as the Ordnance QF 17-pounder in British service and the 76 mm gun M1 in American service.

== Related developments ==
=== 8.8 cm KwK 36 ===
The KwK 36 (abbreviation of Kampfwagenkanone 36) was a tank gun developed and built by Krupp in parallel to the Flak 36, with which it shared ammunition and ballistics. It was the main armament of the Tiger I heavy tank.

=== 8.8 cm PaK 43 and KwK 43 ===
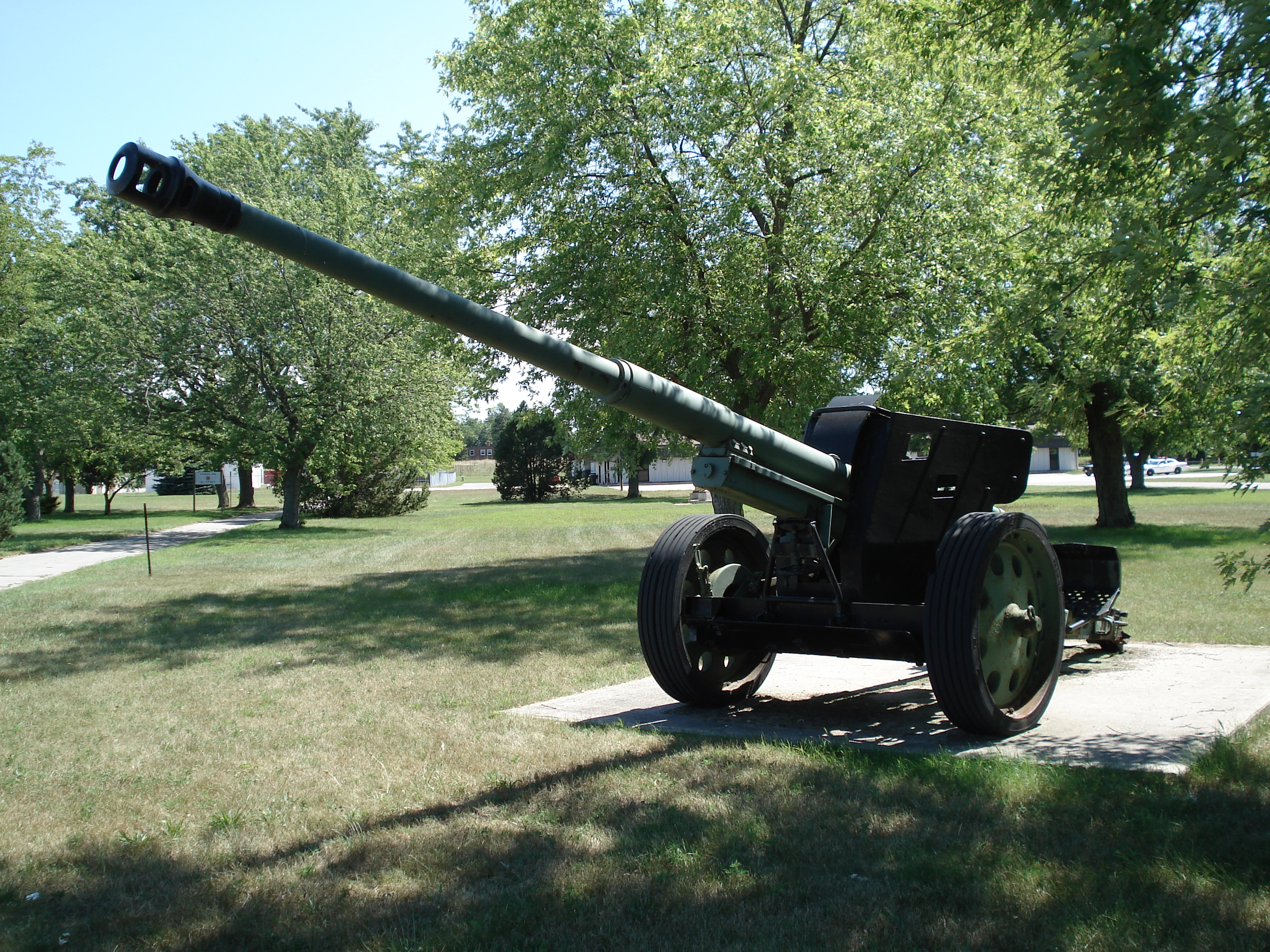
The PaK 43/41 used an intermediate split-trail mount with gun shield, instead of the cruciform mount

At the time that Rheinmetall developed the Flak 41, Krupp tried to compete with their 8.8 cm Gerät 42 proposal, which was not accepted for production as an anti-aircraft gun. Krupp continued development, resulting in the 8.8 cm PaK 43 anti-tank gun and the related 8.8 cm KwK 43 tank gun.

The PaK 43 (an abbreviation of Panzerjägerkanone 43) used a new cruciform mount with the gun much closer to the ground, making it far easier to hide and harder to hit. It was also provided with a much stronger and more angled armour shield to provide better protection to the crew at the cost of weighing about 4 tonnes. (Note: The British Ordnance QF 17-pounder, a high velocity 76 mm anti-tank gun weighed about 2 tonnes) In addition to the towed version, there were also self-propelled versions of the PaK 43 gun, including the lightly armored Nashorn, and the strongly armored, fully casemate-enclosed Elefant and Jagdpanther tank destroyers.

All versions were able to penetrate about 200 mm (7.9 inches) of armour at 1,000 m (3280 feet), allowing it to defeat the armor of any contemporary tank.

The main armament of the Tiger II heavy tank, the KwK 43 tank gun, was the PaK 43 adapted for tank use.

== Variants ==
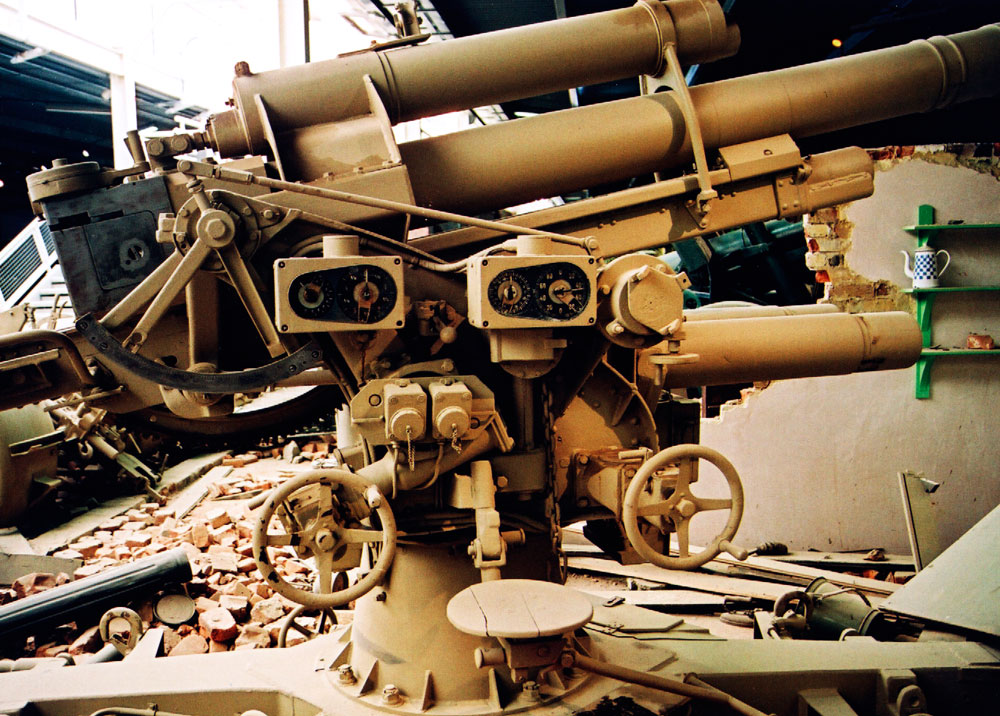
An 8.8cm Flak 37 on display at the Imperial War Museum, Duxford, Great Britain.

Guns using the 88×571R mm cartridge

- 8.8 cm Flak 18 Had a new semi-automatic breech, making it a rapid fire gun. It entered production in Germany in 1933 and used the Sonderanhänger 201 trailer. its weight was seven tonnes. Its rate of fire was 15 to 20 rounds per minute. It was later fitted with a gun shield to protect the crew when engaging ground targets. It was produced by Krupp.
  - Mod 1938 II: Approximately 50 guns were modified so a single man could adjust the elevation and traverse.
- 8.8 cm Flak 36 Entered service 1936–37. It used the redesigned trailer Sonderanhänger 202 which enabled a faster time into action from the move. The SdAnh 202 had twin wheels on two similar carriages. It could engage ground targets from the traveling position. Its weight was seven tonnes. Its rate of fire was 15 to 20 rounds per minute. It was produced by Krupp. It was subsequently fitted with a shield to protect the crew when engaging ground targets.
- 8.8 cm KwK 36: The main gun of the Tiger I (PzKw VI Ausf. E) tank. Despite its lineage, some classify it as a parallel development with very similar specifications rather than a derivative of the Flak 36.
- 8.8 cm Flak 37: It was an updated version of the Flak 36, the main difference being Übertragungser 37 (a data transmission system). It was produced by Krupp.

Guns using the 88×855R mm cartridge

- 8.8 cm Flak 41: This was a weapon developed and produced by Rheinmetall-Borsig to be used with an 855 mm cartridge case. It was fitted to the existing Sonderanhänger 202 as standard and entered service in 1943. The barrel was at first designed as three-section with a length of 74 calibers, and then redesigned to dual-section with a length of 72 calibers.
- 8.8 cm Flak 37/41: This weapon was an attempt to allow the Flak 18/36/37 family to fire the more powerful round of the Flak 41. Only 13 built.

== Users ==
- Brazil
- Bulgaria
- China
- Croatia
- Finland
- France
- Germany
- North Vietnam
- Turkey
- Greece
- Hungary
- Italy
- Romania
- Slovakia
- Spain

== Surviving examples ==
The following museums include 8.8 cm Flak guns in their collections.

Brazil

- Museu de Armas, Veículos e Máquinas Andrea Matarazzo, Bebedouro/SP.
- Academia Militar das Agulhas Negras (AMAN), Resende/RJ
- 1º Grupo de Artilharia Antiaérea (1º GAAAe) Vila Militar, Rio de Janeiro/RJ
- Monumento Nacional dos Mortos da Segunda Guerra Mundial, Two Guns
- Museu Militar Conde de Linhares
- Escola de Sargentos de Logística

Argentina

- National Naval Museum of Tigre

Australia

- Australian Armour and Artillery Museum, Cairns
- Royal Australian Armoured Corps Memorial and Army Tank Museum, Puckapunyal
- Australian War Memorial, Canberra

Austria

- Heeresgeschichtliches Museum, Vienna

Belgium

- Royal Museum of the Armed Forces and Military History, Brussels.

Canada

- Canadian War Museum, Ottawa.
- The Ontario Regiment Museum, Oshawa.
- Royal Military College of Canada, Kingston (PAK 43 and Flak 37).

Denmark

- Danish War Museum, Copenhagen.

Finland

- Ilmatorjuntamuseo, Hyrylä
- Kuivasaari Artillery Museum, Helsinki
- Kauppi forest, on top of Tuomikallio as a memorial, Tampere
- Lohtaja, army training area square - map link

France

- Le Grand Blockhaus, Batz-sur-Mer
- Le Grand Bunker "Musée du Mur de l´Atlantique", Ouistreham
- Overlord Museum, Colleville-sur-Mer
- Musée DDay Omaha, Vierville-sur-Mer
- Airborne Museum, Sainte-Mère-Église
- Musée de la Résistance bretonne, Saint-Marcel, Morbihan(Flak 18)
- Musée du Débarquement, Arromanches-les-Bains
- Musée des blindés, Saumur

Germany

- Deutsches Panzermuseum, Munster
- Aviation Museum Hannover-Laatzen
- Wehrtechnische Studiensammlung Koblenz
- Luftwaffenmuseum der Bundeswehr, Berlin-Gatow
- Deutsches Technikmuseum, Berlin

India

- Cavalry Tank Museum, Ahmednagar

Netherlands

- Overloon War Museum, Overloon
- Atlantikwall-Museum, Hook of Holland
- Bevrijdende Vleugels Museum, Best

New Zealand

- The Vintage Aviator (privately owned by Peter Jackson), Masterton

Norway

- Trondenes Fort, Harstad
- Fredriksvern, Stavern

Poland

- Coastal Defence Museum in Świnoujście, Świnoujście
- Muzeum Śląskie (Silesian Museum), Katowice, Poland

Romania

- National Military Museum, Romania, Bucharest

Serbia

- Military Museum, Belgrade, Belgrade

Slovenia

- Pivka Military Museum, Pivka

South Africa

- South African Museum of Military History Johannesburg

Spain

- Museo Histórico Militar, A Coruña
- Flak 36 in Historical Military Museum of Cartagena (Spain)
- Museo Histórico Militar de Valencia

United Kingdom

- Imperial War Museum Duxford, Duxford
- Imperial War Museum, London
- Royal Armouries, Fort Nelson, Hampshire
- Muckleburgh Collection, Norfolk
- German Occupation Museum, Guernsey

United States

- Virginia War Museum, Newport News, Virginia. One 76 mm hole in outrigger.
- United States Army Air Defense Artillery Museum, Fort Sill, Oklahoma. (Flak 18, Flak 36, Flak 37, Flak 41, 8.8 cm Flak M39(r))
- National Museum of the United States Air Force, Dayton, Ohio
- The Flying Heritage Collection, Everett, Washington
- Military Aviation Museum Virginia Beach, Virginia (Flak 37 in working condition)
- Palm Springs Air Museum, Palm Springs, California
- National WWII Museum, New Orleans, Louisiana
- 2-FlaK 37, Private collection, J Bostek, Michigan www.709th.org
- Indiana Military Museum, Vincennes, Indiana, received from United Kingdom October 22, 2020 and being restored.
- The Texas Air Museum in Slaton, Texas
- American Heritage Museum, Hudson, Massachusetts
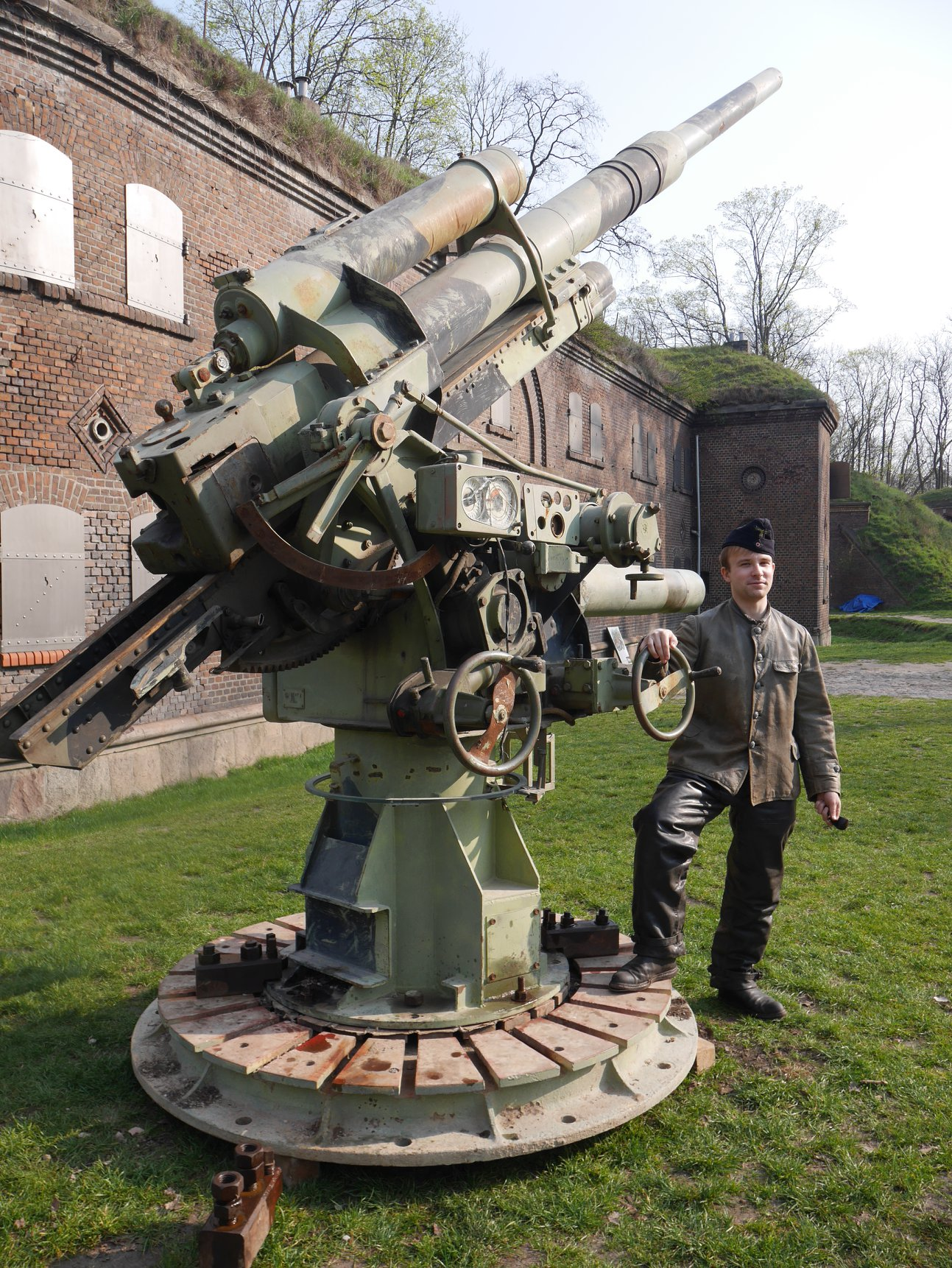
8.8 cm Flak 37 on the fortification mount. Exhibit of Coastal Defence Museum in Świnoujście, Poland.

== Gallery ==
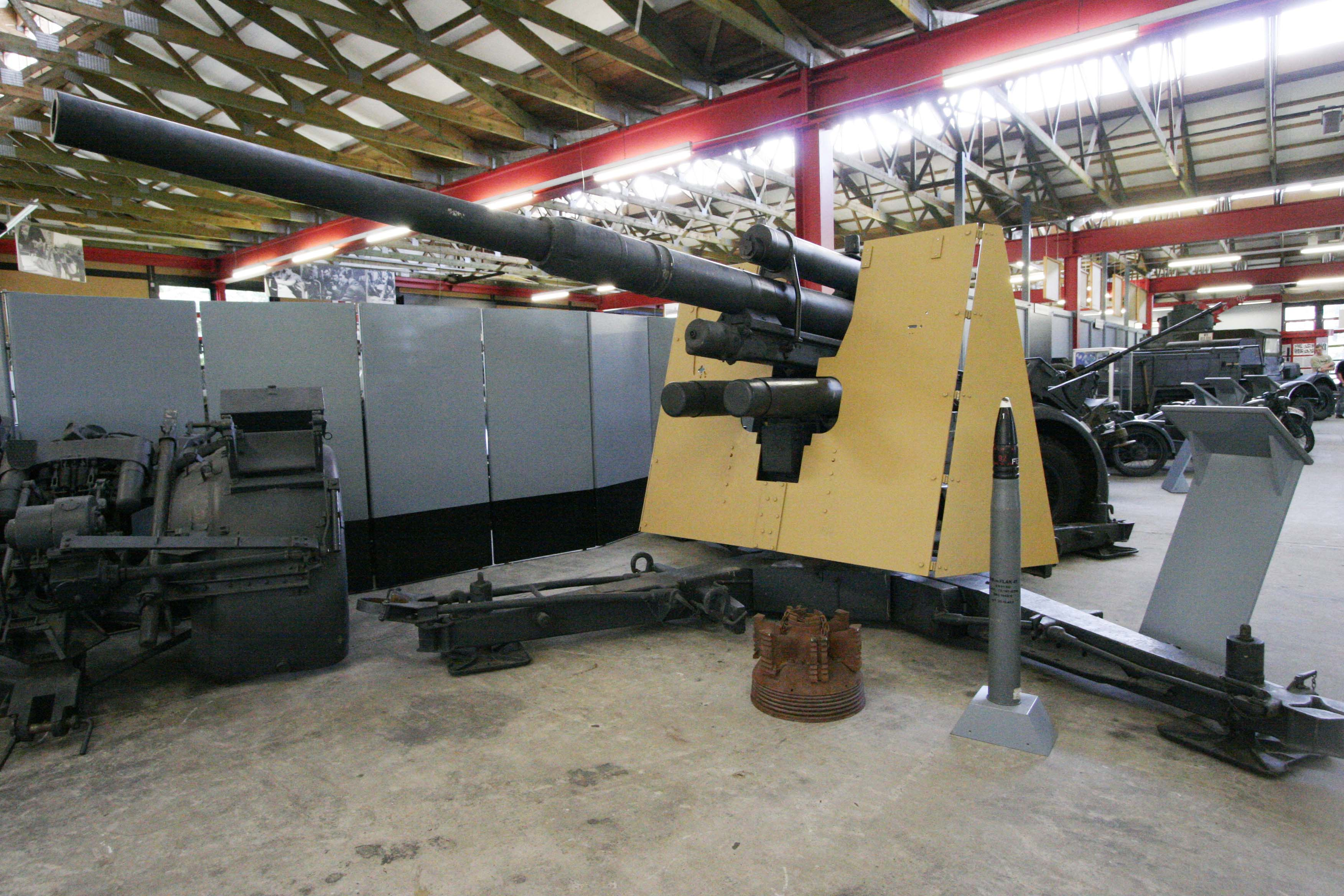
Flak 37 gun at the Deutsches Panzermuseum, Munster, Germany

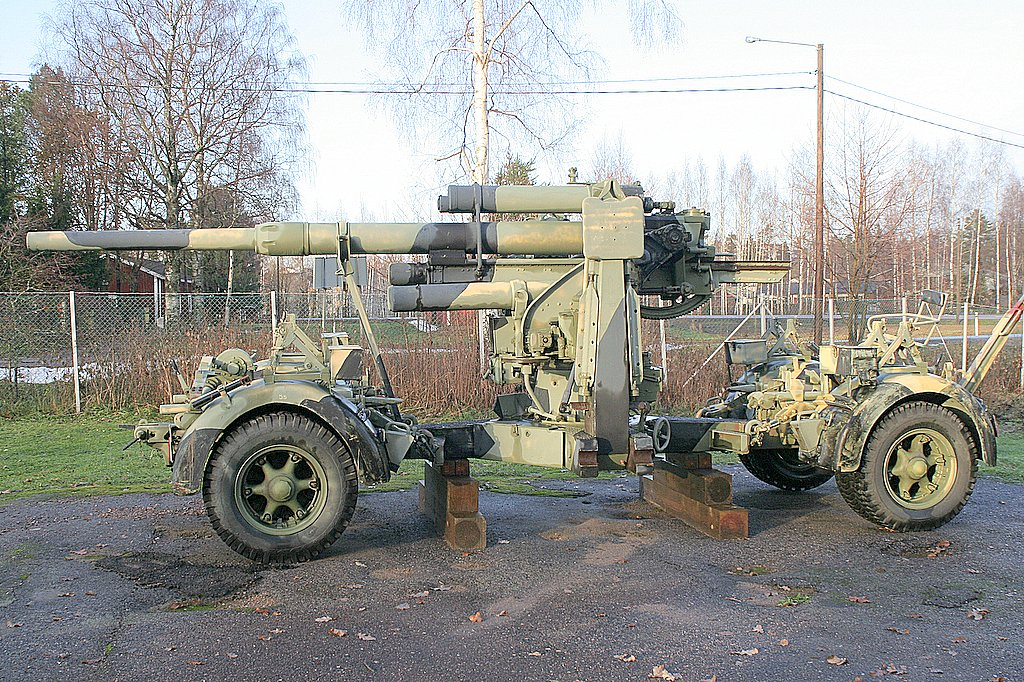
Flak 37 gun at the Anti-aircraft Museum in Hyrylä, Finland

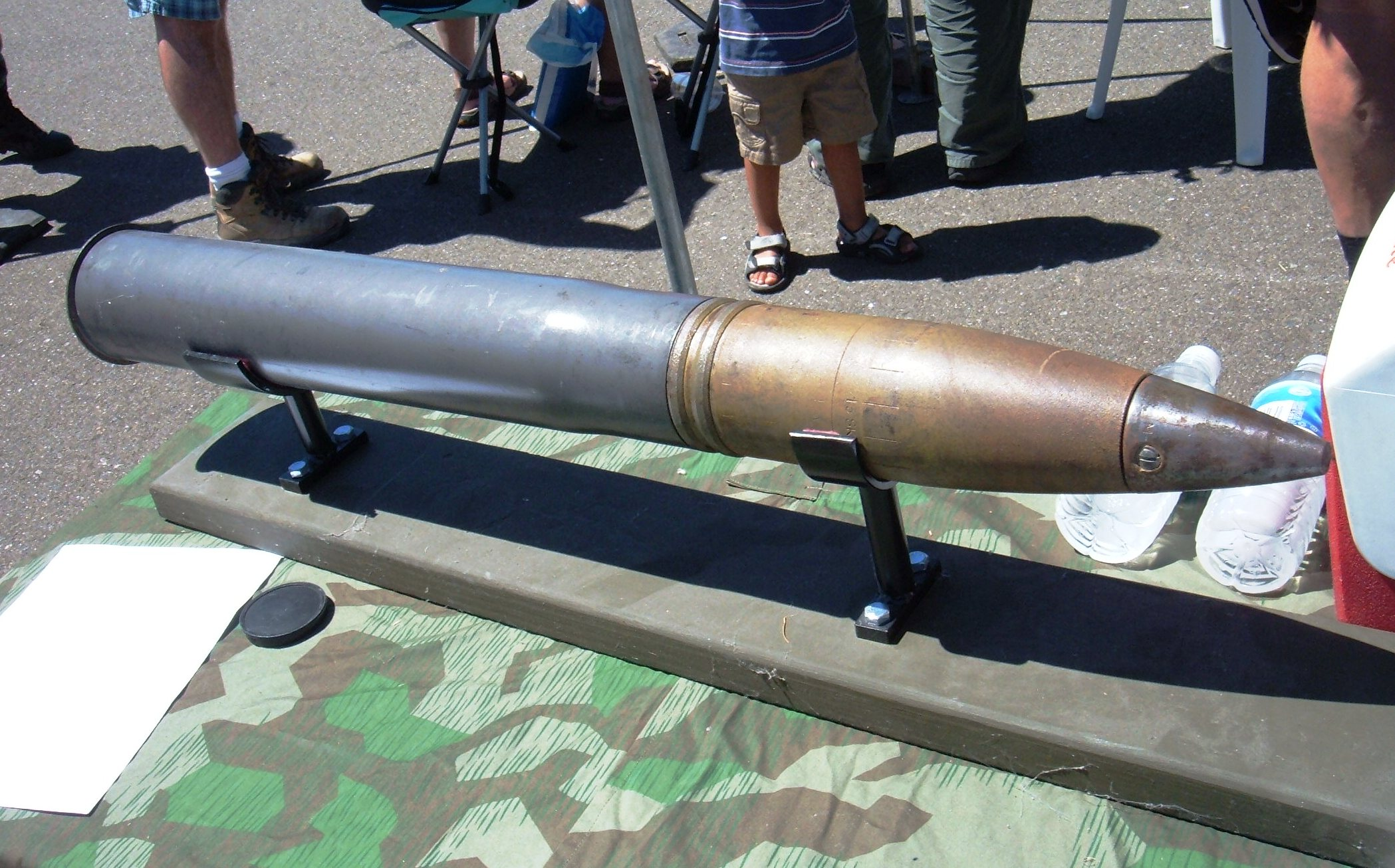
8.8 cm High-explosive shell

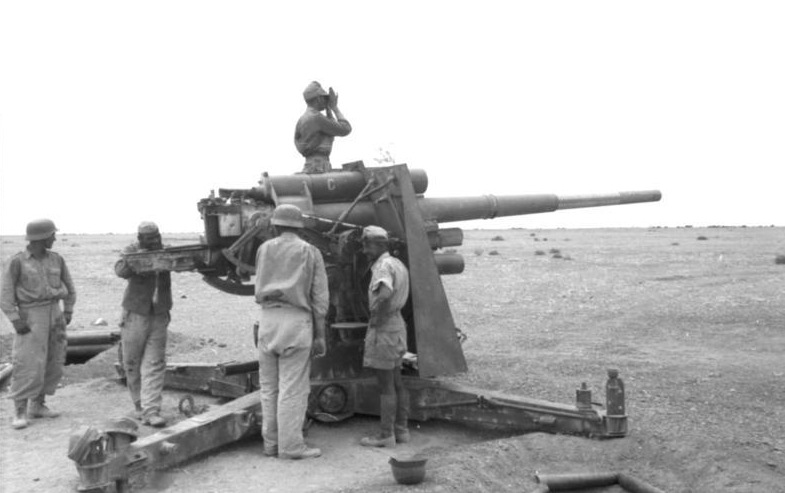
Flak 36 gun in position at Bir Hakeim, North Africa, June 1942

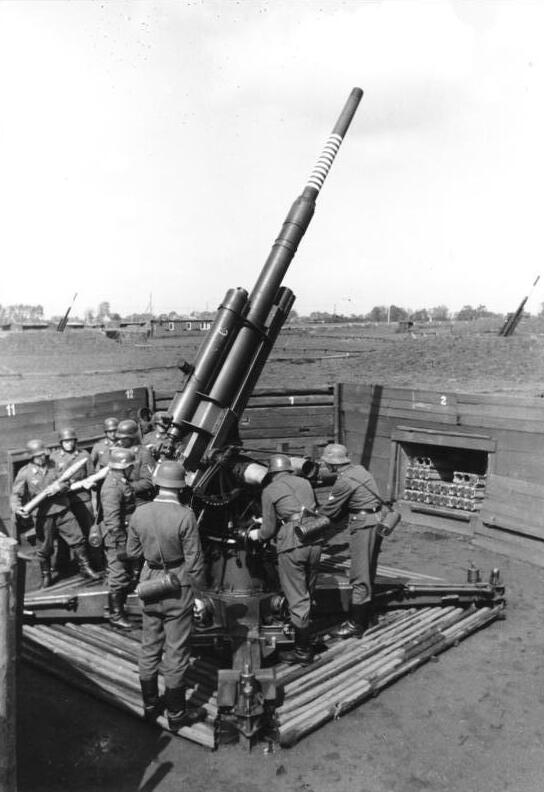
Flak 36 battery in firing position, Germany, 1943

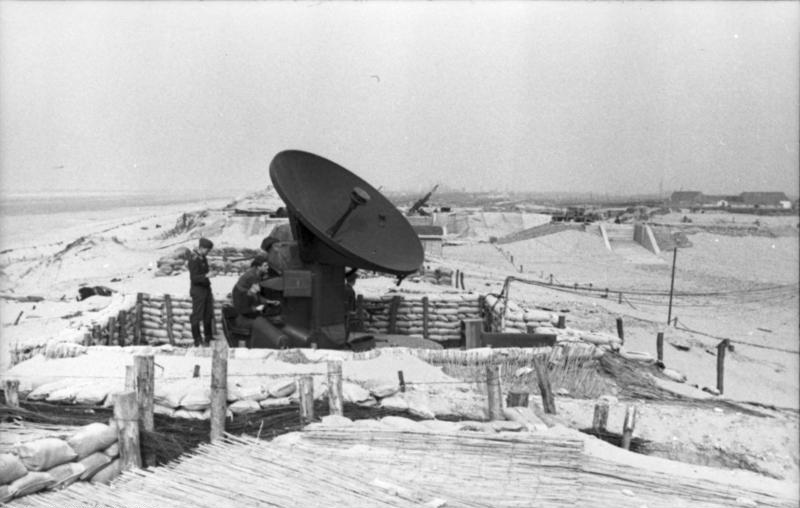
FuMG 39 "Würzburg" radar at an anti-aircraft position on the Atlantic Wall, France, 1942

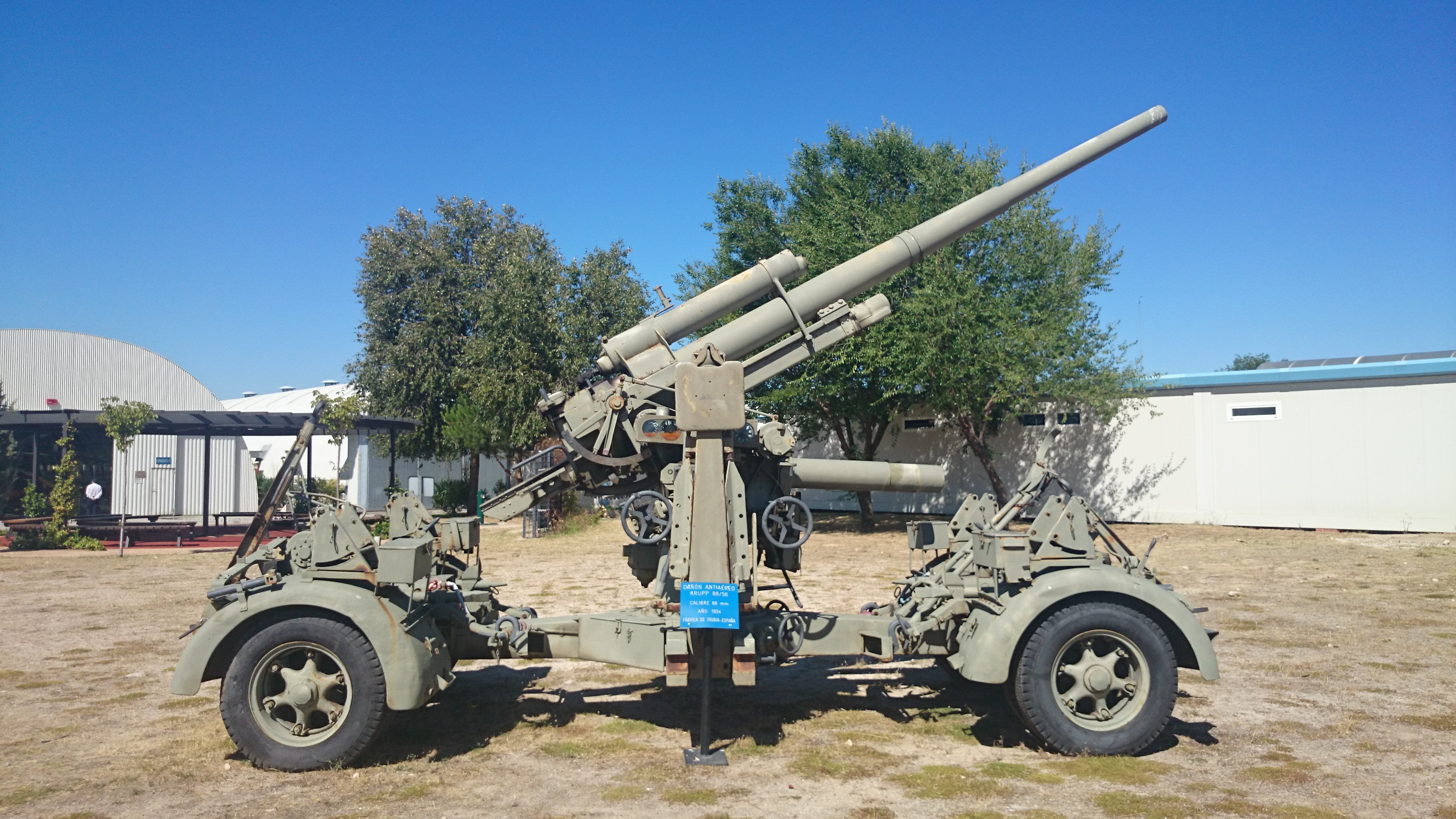
8.8 cm Flak 37 in Madrid, Spain

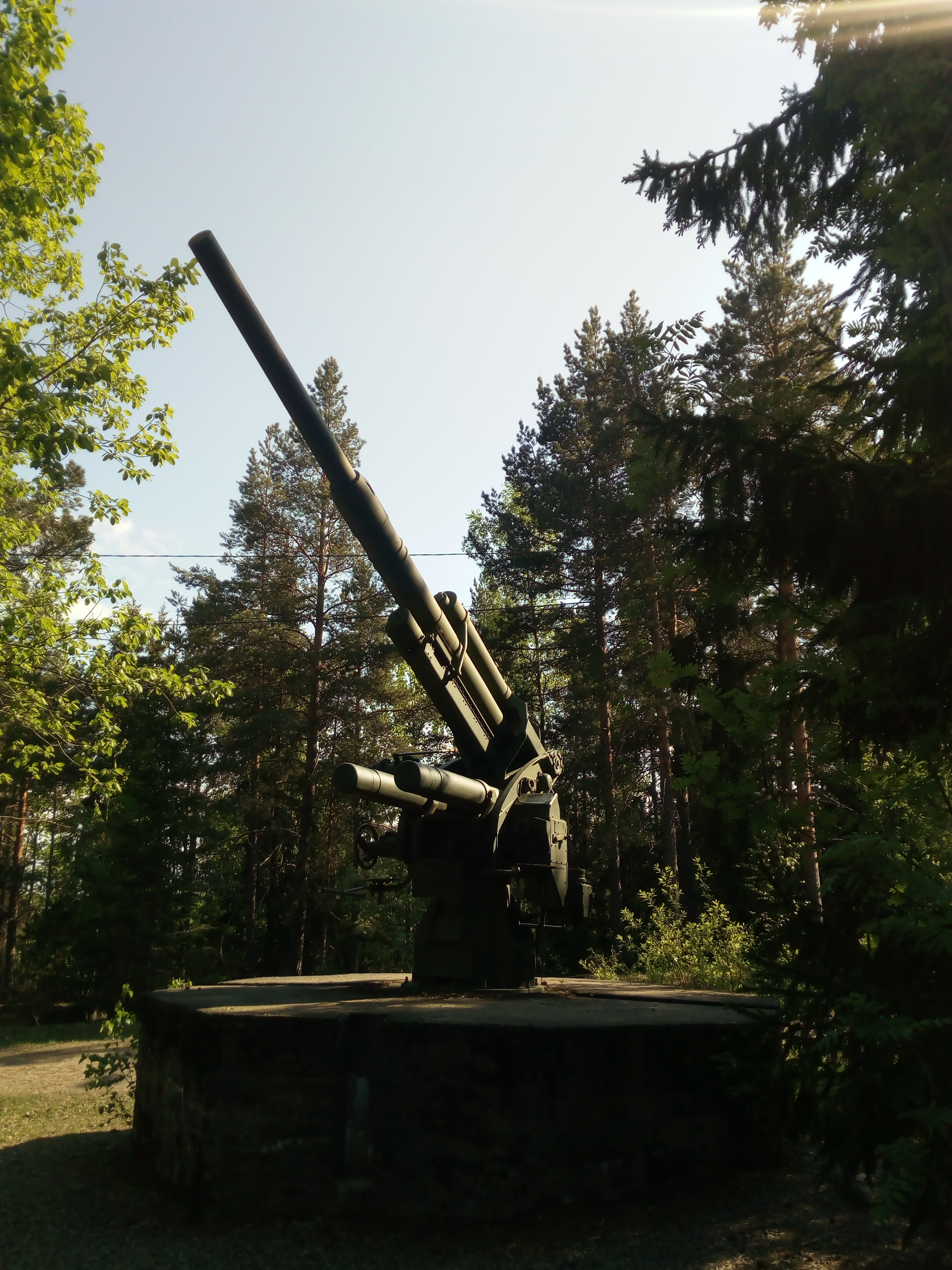
8.8 cm Flak 37 in Tampere, Finland

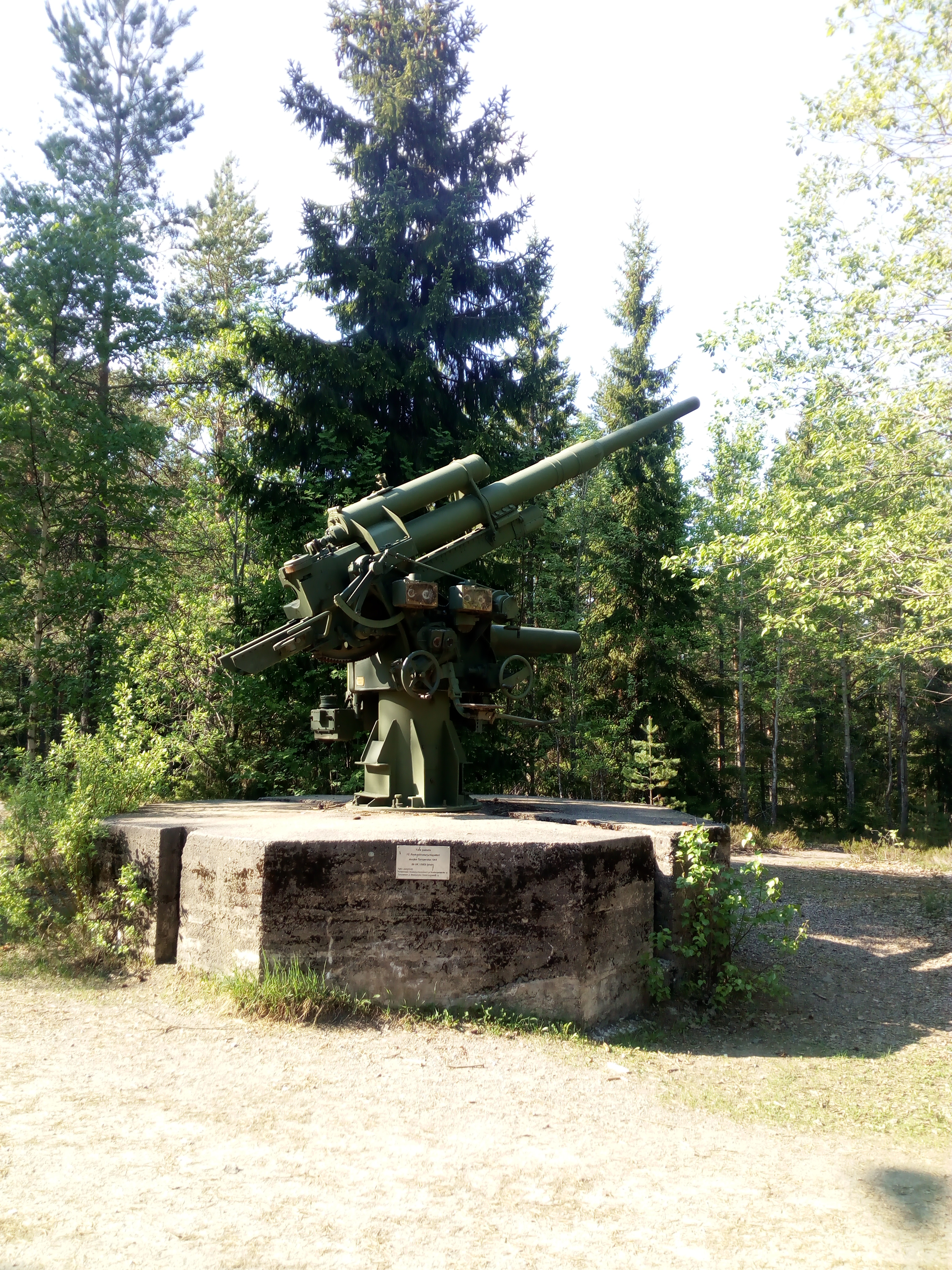
8.8 cm Flak 37 in Tampere, Finland

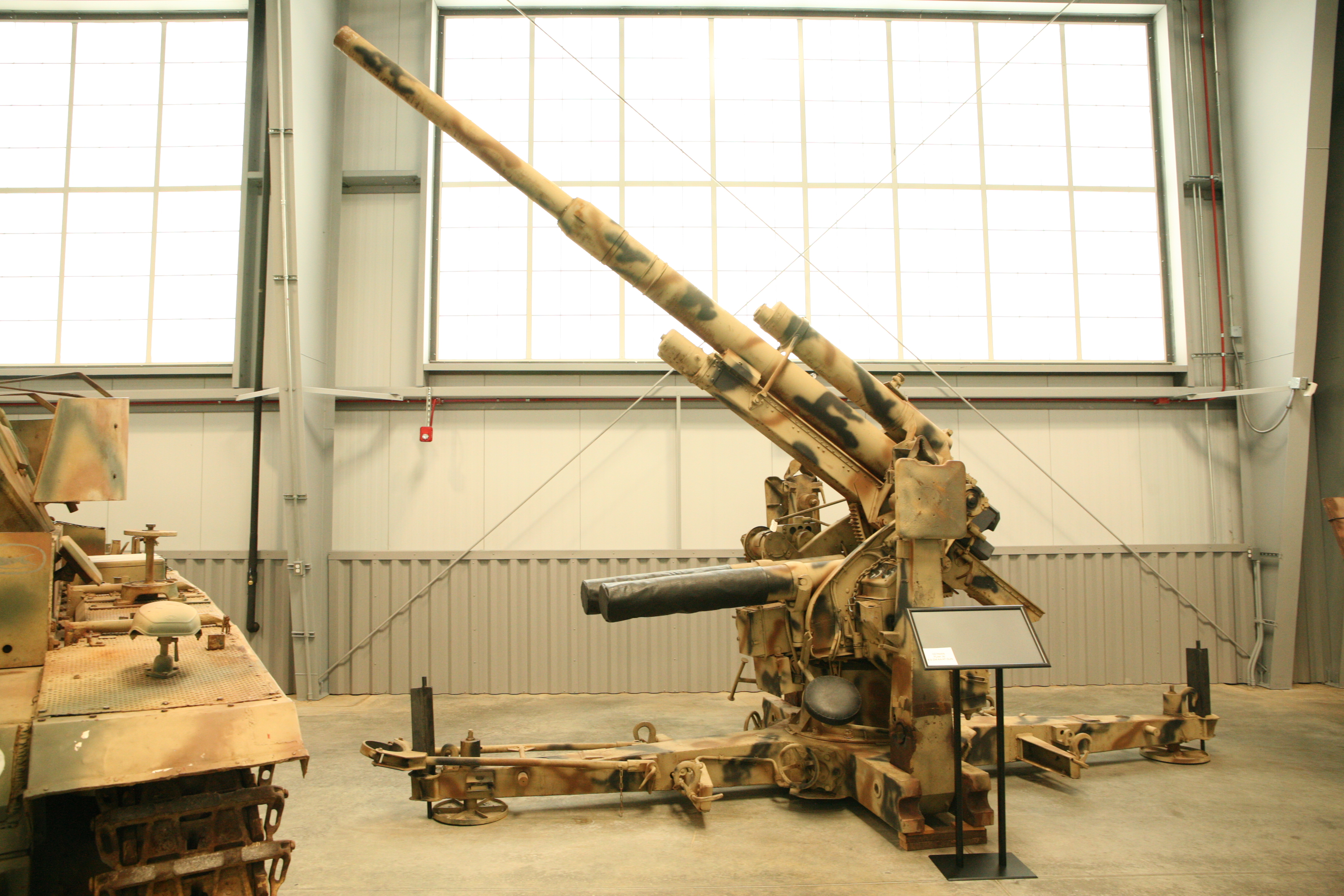
8.8 cm Flak 36 at the U.S. Army Armor & Cavalry Collection

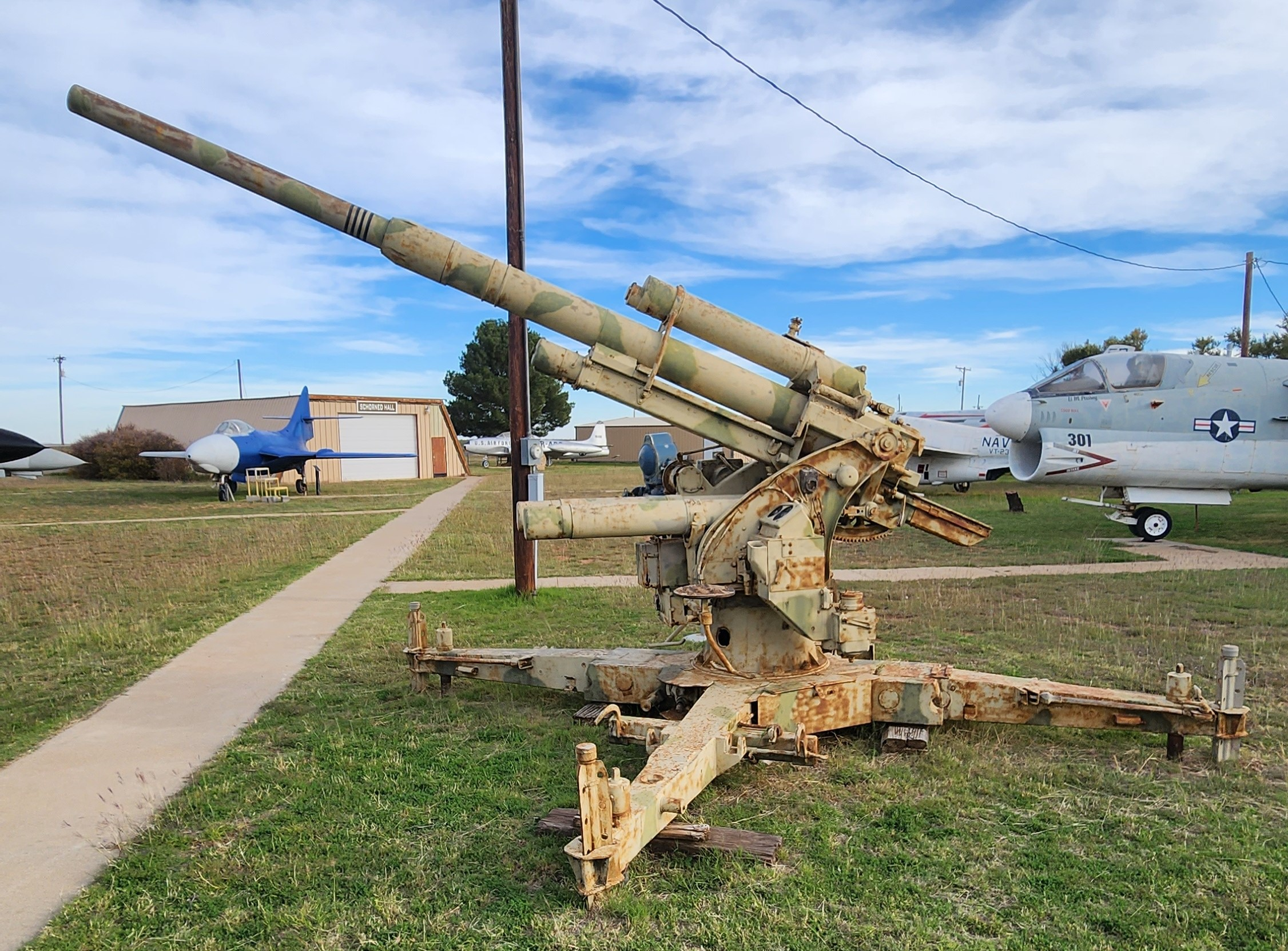
Flak 88mm at the Texas Air Museum in Slaton, Texas.

== See also ==
- Flak tower
- 8.8 cm SK C/30 naval gun: contemporary German Navy dual purpose anti-surface and anti-aircraft gun
- 8.8 cm KwK 36: the main gun of Tiger 1 tank, based on the anti-aircraft gun

=== Weapons of comparable role, performance and era ===
- Bofors 75 mm Model 1929: 75 mm and 80 mm Swedish gun developed alongside the 88 at Bofors
- QF 3.7-inch AA gun: contemporary British anti-aircraft gun, firing a heavier (28 pounds (13 kg)) shell
- Cannone da 90/53: contemporary Italian anti-aircraft gun
- 90 mm Gun M1: contemporary US anti-aircraft gun
- 85 mm air defense gun M1939 (52-K): contemporary Soviet anti-aircraft gun
