= 8.8 cm KwK 36 =

88 mm tank gun used by the German Army during World War II

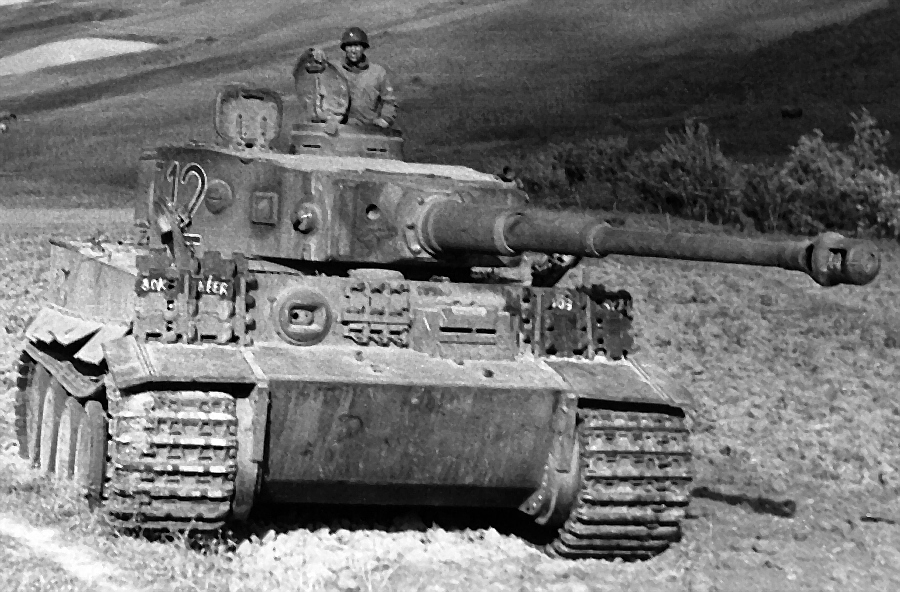
- A captured Tiger I tank fitted with the 8.8 cm KwK 36
- Type: Kampfwagenkanone
- Place of origin: Germany

Service history
- Used by: Nazi Germany
- Wars: World War II

Production history
- Designer: Krupp
- Unit cost: 18,000 ℛ︁ℳ︁

Specifications
- Barrel length: 492.8 cm (194.0 in) bore (56 calibres)
- Shell: Fixed QF 88 × 571mmR
- Shell weight: 10.2 kg (22 lb) Pzgr 39 Armor-piercing, capped, ballistic capped shell 7.3 kg (16 lb) Pzgr 40 Armor-piercing composite rigid (APCR)
- Calibre: 88 mm (3.46 in)
- Elevation: -8° to +15°
- Rate of fire: 10 round per minute
- Muzzle velocity: 780 m/s (2,600 ft/s) APCBC; 930 m/s (3,100 ft/s) APCR
- Maximum firing range: 10,500 m (34,449 ft)

The 8.8 cm KwK 36 (German: 8,8 cm Kampfwagenkanone 36) was an 88-millimetre (3.5 in) tank gun used by the German Army during World War II. This was the primary armament of the PzKpfw VI Tiger I tank. It was developed and built by Krupp.

== Design ==
The 8.8 cm KwK 36 was derived from the 8.8 cm Flak 36 anti-aircraft gun by adapting/modifying it to the limited space available in tank turrets. Parts of the KwK 36 were built to practically the same design as the 75-millimetre (3.0 in) and 50-millimetre (2.0 in) guns already used in German tanks. The breech ring was square in section and 320 millimetres (13 in) on a side. The breech block was of vertical falling wedge type and operated semi-automatically, meaning that after firing the empty cartridge case was automatically ejected, while the breech cocked itself and remained open, ready to receive the next round.

The "L/56" in the designation is descriptor of barrel length; the ratio of the length of the barrel in proportion to the width of the bore. The designation "L/56" means the barrel is 56 times 88 mm - about 4.9 m (16 ft 1 in). The longer the tube is in relation to its bore, the higher the muzzle velocity it can generate on fixed charge. A longer gun barrel allows the expanding gas from the shell's charge to act on the projectile longer than a short barrel, imparting it more velocity and force. For the Tiger II's 8.8 cm KwK 43 L/71, barrel length is 6.25 m (20 ft 6 in) generating a higher velocity.

== Performance ==
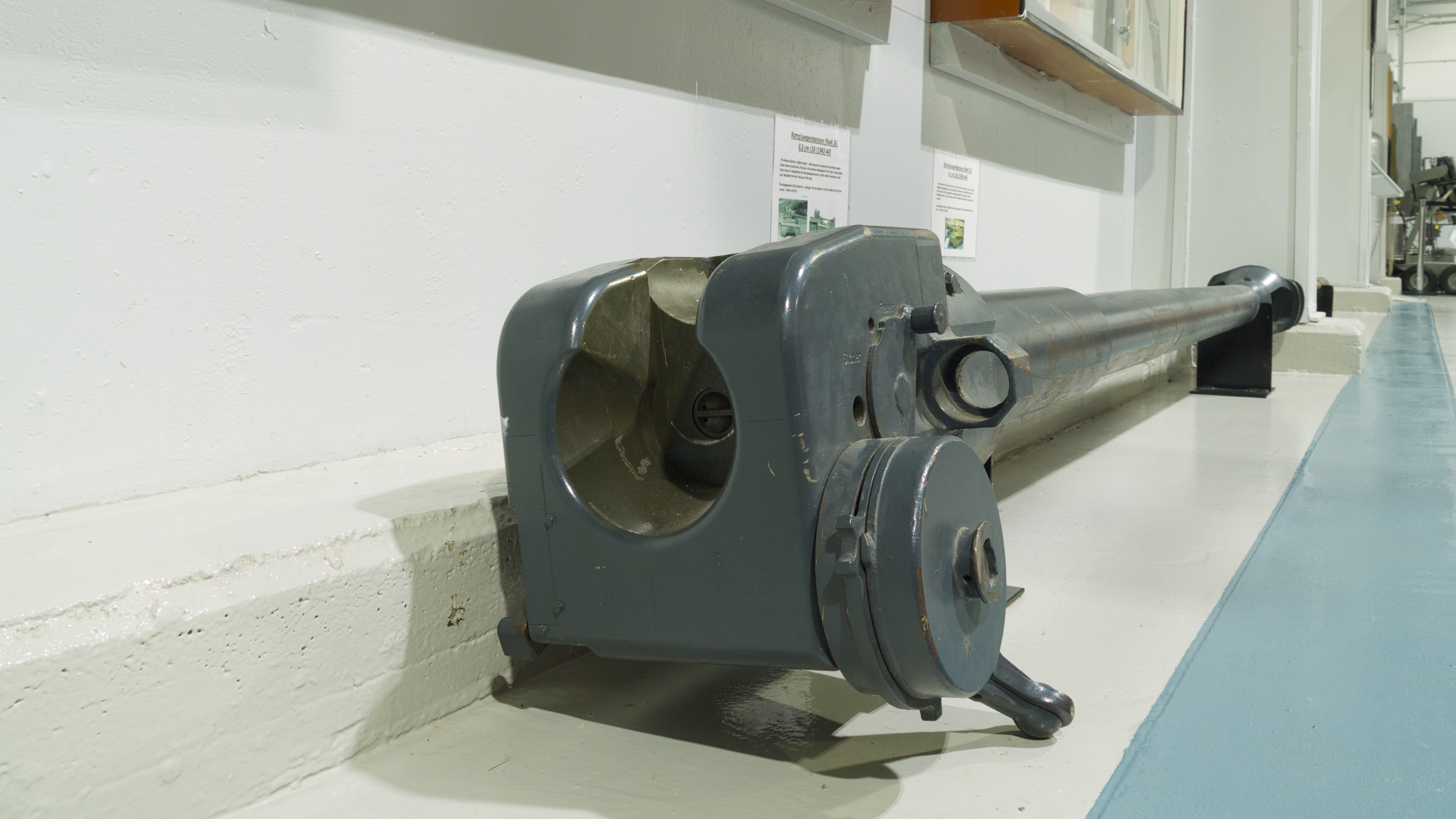
8.8 cm KwK 36 at Base Borden Military Museum

The KwK 36 was very accurate and high-powered, and its high muzzle velocity produced a very flat trajectory. This allowed its gunners a higher margin of error in estimating range.

In British firing trials during the war, a British gunner scored five successive hits from 1,200 yards (1,100 m) at a 16-by-18-inch (41 by 46 cm) target. Another five rounds were fired at targets moving at 15 miles per hour (24 km/h), and, although smoke obscured the gunners' observation, three hits were scored after directions given by the commander. The sighting system resulted in excellent firing accuracy for the 8.8 cm KwK 36 gun on the Tiger I.

=== Capability ===
The gun's performance was highly dependent on distance to target and type of ammunition loaded. For kinetic penetration, the speed of the projectile upon impact is crucial, and the cumulative effect of air resistance decreases the velocity of the shell as the distance to the target increases. The accuracy achieved during controlled test firing to determine the pattern of dispersion gives a greater accuracy than the variation expected during practice firing on a range due to differences between guns, ammunition and gunners; both at precisely known distances. Due to errors in estimating the range and many other factors, the probability of a first shot hit under battlefield conditions was much lower than at the firing range. Observing the tracer from the first round in battle, the average, calm gunner might achieve the firing range accuracy shown in the second column with the second round fired at the same target.

This gun used the same size 88 x 571R mm cartridge, with the exception of being electrically primed compared to the percussion primed cases employed by the Flak 18/36/37.

==== Panzergranate 39 (PzGr. 39) ====
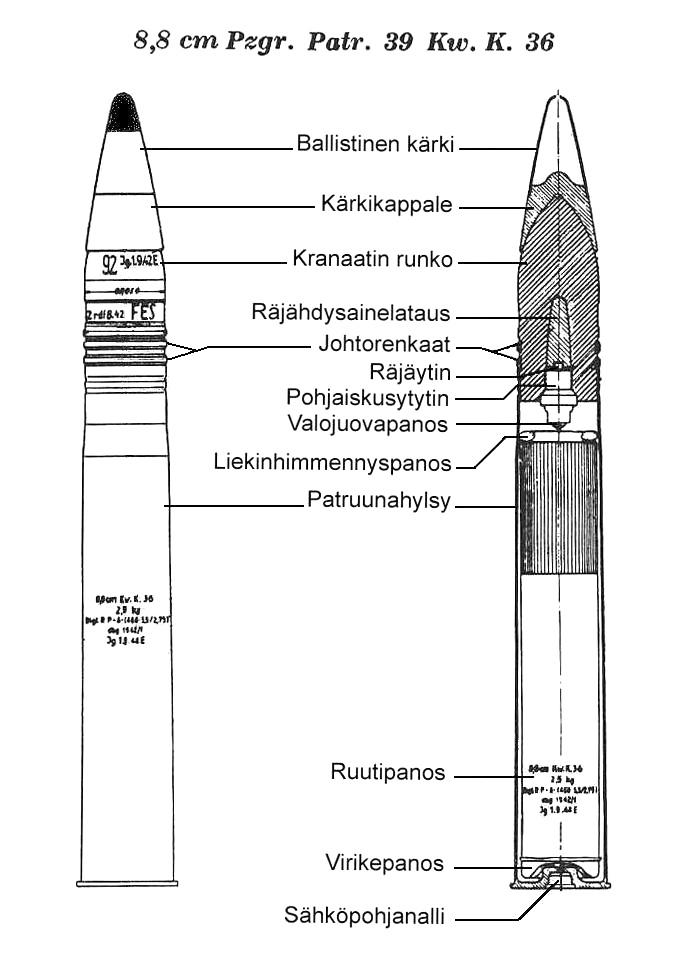
Finnish training chart for KwK 36, shows an 88 mm PzGr. 39 (APCBC round).

- Type: Armour-piercing, capped, ballistic cap (APCBC) projectile with explosive filler and tracer.
- Projectile weight: 10.2 kg (22 lb)
- Muzzle velocity: 773 m/s (2,540 ft/s)
- Explosive filler: 0.059 kg (0.13 lb)
- Propellant weight: 2.5 kg (5.5 lb)

Penetration figures given for an armoured plate 30 degrees from vertical
| | | Hit probability versus 2.5 x 2 m target | |
| Range | Penetration | Test bed | Firing range |
|---|---|---|---|
| 100 m | 132 mm | 100% | 100% |
| 500 m | 110 mm | 100% | 100% |
| 1000 m | 99 mm | 100% | 93% |
| 1500 m | 91 mm | 98% | 74% |
| 2000 m | 83 mm | 87% | 50% |
| 2500 m | n/a | 71% | 31% |
| 3000 m | n/a | 53% | 19% |

==== PzGr. 40 (APCR) ====
- Type: Armour-piercing, composite rigid (APCR) projectile had a sub-calibre tungsten carbide core.
- Projectile weight: 7.3 kg (16 lb)
- Muzzle velocity: 930 m/s (3,100 ft/s)
- Propellant weight: 2.85 kg (6.3 lb)

Penetration figures given for an armoured plate 30 degrees from vertical
| | | Hit probability versus 2.5 x 2 m target | |
| Range | Penetration | Testbed | Firing range |
|---|---|---|---|
| 100 m | 171 mm | 100% | 100% |
| 500 m | 156 mm | 100% | 100% |
| 1000 m | 138 mm | 99% | 80% |
| 1500 m | 123 mm | 89% | 52% |
| 2000 m | 110 mm | 71% | 31% |
| 2500 m | n/a | 55% | 19% |

==== Hl.39 (HEAT) ====
- Type: high explosive anti-tank (HEAT) round with a shaped charge.
- Projectile weight: 7.65 kg (16.9 lb)
- Muzzle velocity: 600 m/s (2,000 ft/s)

Penetration figures given for an armored plate 30 degrees from vertical
| | | Hit probability versus 2.5 x 2m target | |
| Range | Penetration | Testbed | Firing range |
|---|---|---|---|
| 100 m | 90 mm | 100% | 100% |
| 500 m | 90 mm | 100% | 98% |
| 1000 m | 90 mm | 94% | 62% |
| 1500 m | 90 mm | 72% | 34% |
| 2000 m | 90 mm | 52% | 20% |

==== Sprgr. L/45 (HE) ====
- Type: high explosive (HE) round
- Projectile weight: 9 kg (20 lb)
- Explosive filler: 0.9 kg of amatol (3765 Kilojoules)
- Propellant weight: 2.55 kg (5.6 lb)–2.95 kg (6.5 lb)

== Penetration comparison ==
Penetration figures (90 degrees) uses American and British 50% success criteria, and allowing direct comparison to foreign gun performance.
| Ammunition type | Muzzle velocity (m/s) | Penetration (mm) | | | | | | | | | |
| Ammunition type | Muzzle velocity (m/s) | 100 m | 250 m | 500 m | 750 m | 1000 m | 1250 m | 1500 m | 2000 m | 2500 m | 3000 m |
|---|---|---|---|---|---|---|---|---|---|---|---|
| PzGr. 39 (APCBC) | 780 m/s (2,600 ft/s) | 162 | 158 | 151 | 144 | 138 | 132 | 126 | 116 | 106 | 97 |
| PzGr. 40 (APCR) | 930 m/s (3,100 ft/s) | 219 | 212 | 200 | 190 | 179 | 170 | 160 | 143 | 128 | 115 |
| Hl.39 (HEAT) | 600 m/s (2,000 ft/s) | 110 | 110 | 110 | 110 | 110 | 110 | 110 | 110 | 110 | 110 |

== See also ==
- 8.8 cm KwK 43 L/71 - the direct successor to this gun, and the one mounted on the Tiger II
- 8.8 cm Flak 18/36/37/41, the prominent anti-aircraft and anti-tank weapon the 8.8 cm KwK 36 is often confused with.

=== Weapons of comparable role, performance, and era ===
- British Ordnance QF 17-pounder
- Romanian 88 mm 1944 anti-tank gun
- Soviet 85 mm D-5T/ZiS-S-53
- United States 90 mm Gun M3

== Bibliography ==
- Green Michael, Panzers at War. London: Zenith Press, 2005. ISBN 0-7603-2152-3
- Thomas L. Jentz, Germany's Tiger Tanks: Tiger I and Tiger II - Combat Tactics. London: Schiffer Publishing, 1996. ISBN 0-7643-0225-6
- H.Dv. 481/60 Merkblatt für die Munition der 8,8 cm Kampfwagenkanone 36
