= 8.8 cm KwK 43 =

German tank gun

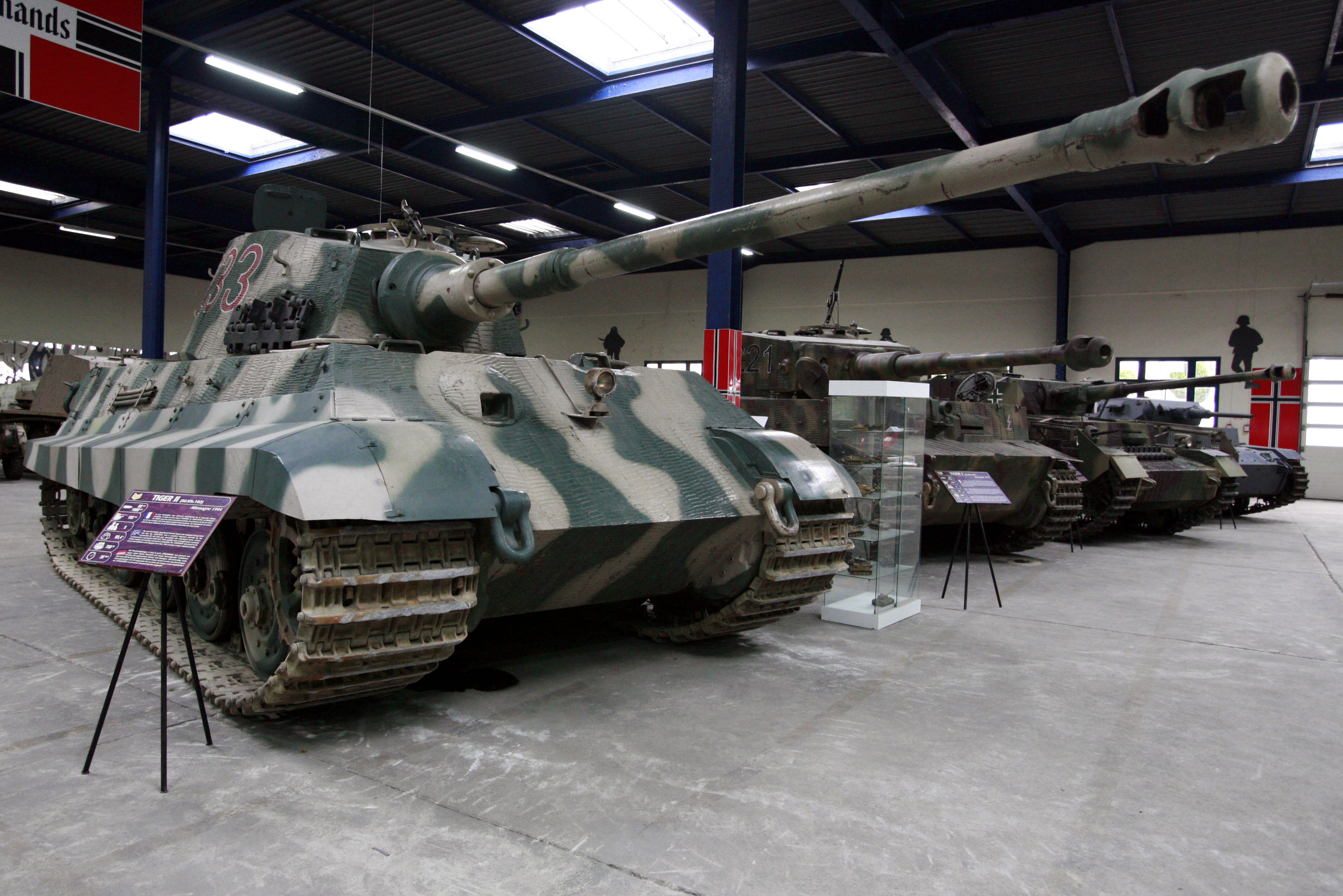
- A Tiger II mounting an 8.8 cm KwK 43 gun, preserved at the Musée des Blindés
- Type: Kampfwagenkanone
- Place of origin: Nazi Germany

Service history
- Used by: Nazi Germany
- Wars: World War II

Production history
- Designer: Krupp
- Unit cost: 21,000 ℛ︁ℳ︁

Specifications
- Mass: 2,265 kg (4,993 lb)
- Barrel length: 6,248 mm (246.0 in) bore (71 calibres)
- Shell: Fixed QF 88 × 822mm R
- Shell weight: 7.3 kg (16 lb) Armor-piercing composite rigid (APCR) Pzgr 40/43
- Calibre: 88 mm (3.46 in)
- Elevation: -8° to +15°
- Rate of fire: 6–10 round per minute
- Muzzle velocity: 1,130 m/s (3,700 ft/s)
- Maximum firing range: 9,350 m (30,680 ft)

The 8.8 cm KwK 43 (Kampfwagenkanone —"fighting vehicle cannon") was an 88 mm 71-calibre-length tank gun designed by Krupp and used by the German Wehrmacht during the Second World War. It was mounted as the primary armament on the Panzerkampfwagen VI Ausf. B Tiger II. The 8.8 cm Pak 43, an anti-tank gun, was very similar in design but mounted on tank destroyers or deployed stand-alone in the field.

== Design and development ==
At 6.24 m (20.5 ft), the length of the KwK 43's barrel was over 1.3 metres longer than of that of the 8.8 cm KwK 36 used for the Tiger I. The cartridge of the KwK 43's shell was also considerably longer (at 82.2 centimetres (32.4 in)) and wider than that of the KwK 36's, meaning that the KwK 43 allowed more room for a heavier propellant charge in its cartridge case than the KwK 36. All guns of the Pak/KwK 43 series could use the same ammunition interchangeably.

The KwK 43 and Pak 43 were initially manufactured with monobloc barrels, meaning the barrel was made from one piece. However, due to the weapons' extremely high muzzle velocity and operating pressures when fired, the weapon suffered from accelerated barrel wear. As a result, the change was made to manufacture the Pak/KwK 43 with a two-piece barrel instead of a monobloc barrel. This had minimal to no effect on the performance of the gun, but made replacing a worn-out barrel much faster and easier than before.

In addition, the massively increased operating pressures of the new gun also required a new armour-piercing shell to be designed. The result of this was the PzGr.39/43 APCBC-HE projectile, which was similar to the older 10.2-kilogram (22 lb) PzGr.39-1 APCBC-HE projectile used by the 8.8 cm KwK 36 and Pak 43 guns except for the addition of much wider driving bands. The wider driving bands of the PzGr.39/43 increased the weight of the shell to 10.4 kilograms (23 lb) as a result. However, as the full transition to the newer PzGr.39/43 rounds was slow to take place, the older PzGr.39-1 rounds were instead allowed to be used for the KwK 43 & Pak 43 provided the gun had fired no more than 500 rounds. Above that set amount, the expected barrel wear combined with the narrower driving bands of the PzGr.39-1 would lead to a loss of pressure and therefore muzzle velocity in the gun. The new PzGr.39/43 could be fired without loss of pressure until the barrel was worn out, thus requiring no restriction.

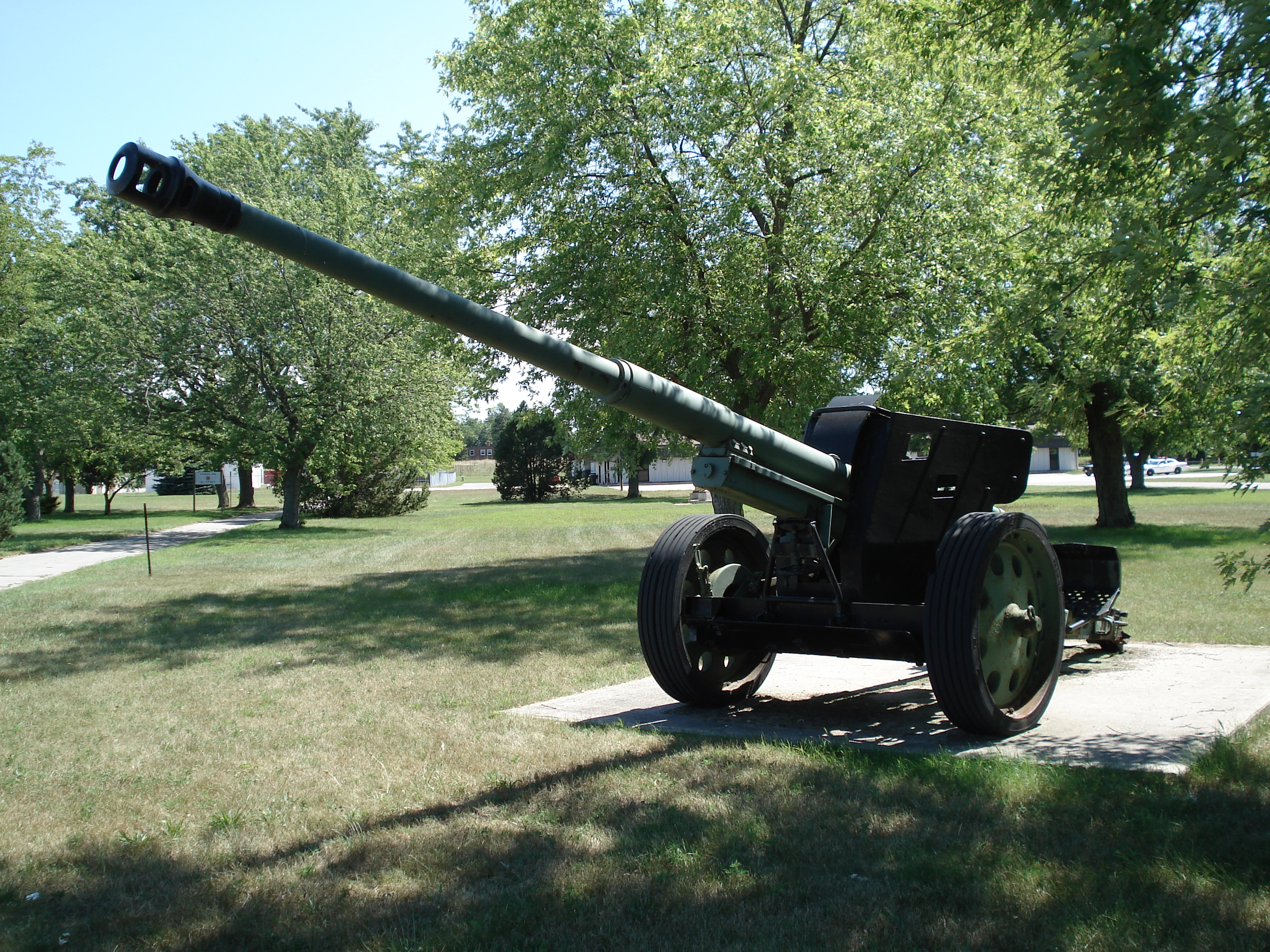
Pak 43/41 at CFB Borden.

PzGr.39-1 FES & Al all up weight: 10.2 kg (9.87 kg without fuse & bursting charge)

PzGr.39/43 FES & Al all up weight: 10.4 kg (10.06 kg without fuse & bursting charge)

The same 278 gram BdZ 5127 fuse and 59 gram Amatol bursting charge were used for both types of projectile (PzGr.39-1 & PzGr.39/43), requiring armoured targets of 30 mm or thicker to ignite after penetration for maximum behind-armour effects.

== Performance ==
=== PzGr. 39/43 (APCBC-HE) ===
- Type: Armour-piercing, capped, ballistic cap - high explosive
- Projectile weight: 10.40 kg (22.9 lb)
- Muzzle velocity: 1,000 m/s (3,300 ft/s)

Penetration figures against rolled homogeneous armour plate.
Range (metres)	Penetration vertical (mm)	Penetration at 30° (mm)	Hit probability versus 2.5 m x 2 m target percent (Note: Jentz explained that "These accuracy tables are based on the assumptions that the actual range to the target has been correctly determined and that the distribution of hits is centered on the aiming point. The first column shows the accuracy obtained during controlled test firing to determine the pattern of dispersion. The figures in the second column include the variation expected during practice firing due to differences between guns, ammunition and gunners. These accuracy tables do not reflect the actual probability of hitting a target under battlefield conditions. Due to errors in estimating the range and many other factors, the probability of a first hit was much lower than shown in these tables. However, the average, calm gunner, after sensing the tracer from the first round, could achieve the accuracy shown in the second column.")	
Range (metres)	Penetration vertical (mm)	Penetration at 30° (mm)	Testing	Practice
100	233	202	100	100
500	219	185	100	100
1000	204	165	100	85
1500	190	148	95	61
2000	176	132	85	43
2500	n/a	n/a	74	30
3000	n/a	n/a	61	23
3500	n/a	n/a	51	17
4000	n/a	n/a	42	13

=== PzGr. 40/43 (APCR) ===
- Type: Armour-piercing, composite rigid
- Projectile weight: 7.30 kg (16.1 lb)
- Muzzle velocity: 1,130 m/s (3,700 ft/s)

Penetration figures against rolled homogeneous armour plate.
Range (metres)	Penetration vertical (mm)	Penetration at 30° (mm)	Hit probability (2.5 m x 2 m target) percent	
Range (metres)	Penetration vertical (mm)	Penetration at 30° (mm)	Testing	Practice
100	274	237	100	100
500	251	217	100	100
1000	223	193	100	89
1500	211	170	97	66
2000	184	152	89	47
2500	n/a	n/a	78	34
3000	n/a	n/a	66	25

=== Gr. 39/43 HL (HEAT) ===
- Type: High explosive anti-tank
- Projectile weight: 7.65 kg (16.9 lb)
- Muzzle velocity: 600 m/s (2,000 ft/s)
- Penetration: 90 mm (30 degrees)

=== Sprgr. 43 (HE) ===
- Type: High explosive
- Projectile weight: 9.5 kg (21 lb)
- Explosive Charge: 1.02 kg (2.25 lb) Amatol (4,270 Kilojoules)

== Penetration comparison ==
Calculated penetration (90 degrees)
Ammunition type	Muzzle velocity	Penetration (mm)									
Ammunition type	Muzzle velocity	100 m	250 m	500 m	750 m	1000 m	1250 m	1500 m	2000 m	2500 m	3000 m
PzGr. 39/43 (APCBC)	1,000 m/s (3,300 ft/s)	232	227	219	211	204	196	190	176	164	153
PzGr. 40/43 (APCR)	1,130 m/s (3,700 ft/s)	304	296	282	269	257	245	234	213	194	177
Gr. 39/3 HL (HEAT)	600 m/s (2,000 ft/s)	110	110	110	110	110	110	110	110	110	110

== Anti-tank gun ==
The anti-tank gun version of the 8.8 cm KwK 43 was known as the 8.8 cm Pak 43. This name was also applied to versions of this weapon mounted in various armored vehicles designed to hunt tanks, such as the Jagdpanther, Hornisse/Nashorn and Ferdinand/Elefant Panzerjäger tank destroyers. The Nashorn was the first vehicle to carry the KwK/Pak 43 series of guns. The series included: Pak 43 (cruciform mount), Pak 43/41 (two-wheel split-trail carriage), Pak 43/1 (Nashorn), and Pak 43/2 (Ferdinand/Elefant), all with monobloc (one-piece) barrels; Pak 43/3 and 43/4 (Jagdpanther) with two-piece barrels, and KwK 43 (Tiger II) with a two-piece barrel.

== See also ==
- 8.8 cm KwK 36 L/56 - The predecessor of the 8.8 cm KwK 43 which was mounted on the Tiger I.
- 8.8 cm Flak 18/36/37/41 - The prominent anti-aircraft and anti-tank weapon with which the 8.8 cm KwK 43 is often confused.

=== Weapons of comparable role, performance and era ===
- British Ordnance QF 32 pounder
- Soviet 100 mm D-10T
- United States 90 mm T15E1/T15E2

== Sources ==
- Thomas L. Jentz, Germany's Tiger Tanks: Tiger I and Tiger II - Combat Tactics. London: Schiffer Publishing, 1996. ISBN 0-7643-0225-6
