= German Occupation Museum =

Coordinates: 49.429°N 2.593°W

- Established: 1966
- Location: Guernsey
- Type: History Museum
- Website: germanoccupationmuseum.co.uk

The German Occupation Museum of Guernsey illustrates the First and Second World War, when the German Wehrmacht had occupied the British Channel Islands.

The occupation began at 30 June 1940, as the first Ju-52 of the Luftwaffe landed at the Guernsey airfield, and ended on 9 May 1945, one day after the German Instrument of Surrender, when British troops entered the island and interned the occupying German troops.

The Museum is located on the south of the island on Les Houards street. It was 1966 when the young Richard Heaume began collecting, and he has developed the museum to this day into a remarkable place of remembrance of the five years of occupation. The museum's collections include a number of original exhibits, illustrating the lives of the natives and the occupants. These include a replica battle post with one captured from the Occupation of Czechoslovakia by the Wehrmacht with a Panzerabwehrkanone 4,7-cm-PaK 36(t), as well as one Rotor Machine Enigma-M4. The collection is the largest on the Channel Islands, and contains memorabilia from the beginning of the occupation to Liberation Day.

A similar museum exists on Jersey, now run by the Channel Islands Occupation Society (CIOS).
