= Ferdinand Porsche =

Austrian-born German automotive engineer, inventor (1875–1951)

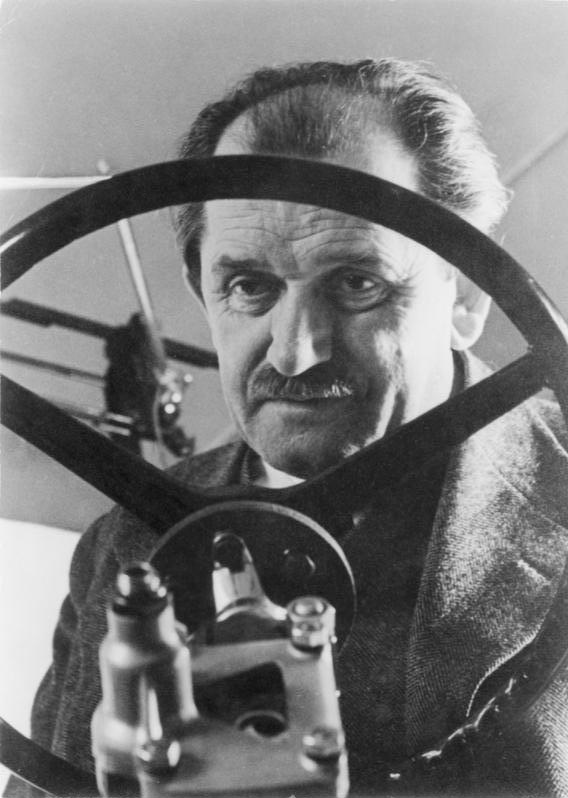
- Porsche in 1940
- Born: 3 September 1875; Maffersdorf, Bohemia, Austria-Hungary (Now Liberec XXX-Vratislavice nad Nisou, Liberec Region, Czech Republic)
- Died: 30 January 1951 (aged 75); Stuttgart, West Germany
- Citizenship: Austria-Hungary (1875–1918); Czechoslovakia (1918–1934); Germany (1934–1949); West Germany (1949–1951)
- Known for: Founding and leading the Porsche AG
- Political party: Nazi Party (1937–1945)
- Spouse: Aloisia Johanna Kaes
- Children: Louise Piëch; Ferry Porsche
- Parents: Anton Porsche (father); Anna Ehrlich (mother)
- Family: Porsche
- Engineering career
- Projects: Mercedes-Benz SS/SSK; Tiger I; Tiger II; Elefant; Panzer VIII Maus; Volkswagen Beetle
- Awards: Officer's Cross of the Order of Franz Joseph (1917); Wilhelm Exner Medal (1936); German National Prize for Art and Science (1938); SS-Ehrenring (1944); Knights Cross of the War Merit Cross (1944)

Signature
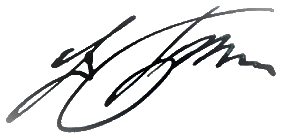

Ferdinand Porsche (Note: The name Porsche is pronounced [ˈpɔʁʃə] in German and /ˈpɔːrʃə/ POR-shə in English, with an audible schwa. However, the realization /pɔːrʃ/ PORSH is also common in English.) (3 September 1875 – 30 January 1951) was an Austrian-German automotive engineer and founder of the Porsche AG. He is best known for creating the first gasoline-electric hybrid vehicle (Lohner-Porsche), the Volkswagen Beetle, the Auto Union racing cars, the Mercedes-Benz SS/SSK, and several other important developments and Porsche automobiles.

An important contributor to the war effort of Nazi Germany during World War II, Porsche was involved in the production of advanced tanks such as the VK 45.01 (P), the Elefant (initially called "Ferdinand") self-propelled gun, and the Panzer VIII Maus super-heavy tank, as well as other weapon systems, including the V-1 flying bomb. Porsche was a member of the Nazi Party and an honorary Oberführer of the Allgemeine SS. He was a recipient of the German National Prize for Art and Science, the SS-Ehrenring and the War Merit Cross.

Porsche was inducted into the International Motorsports Hall of Fame in 1996 and was named the Car Engineer of the Century in 1999.

== Early life ==
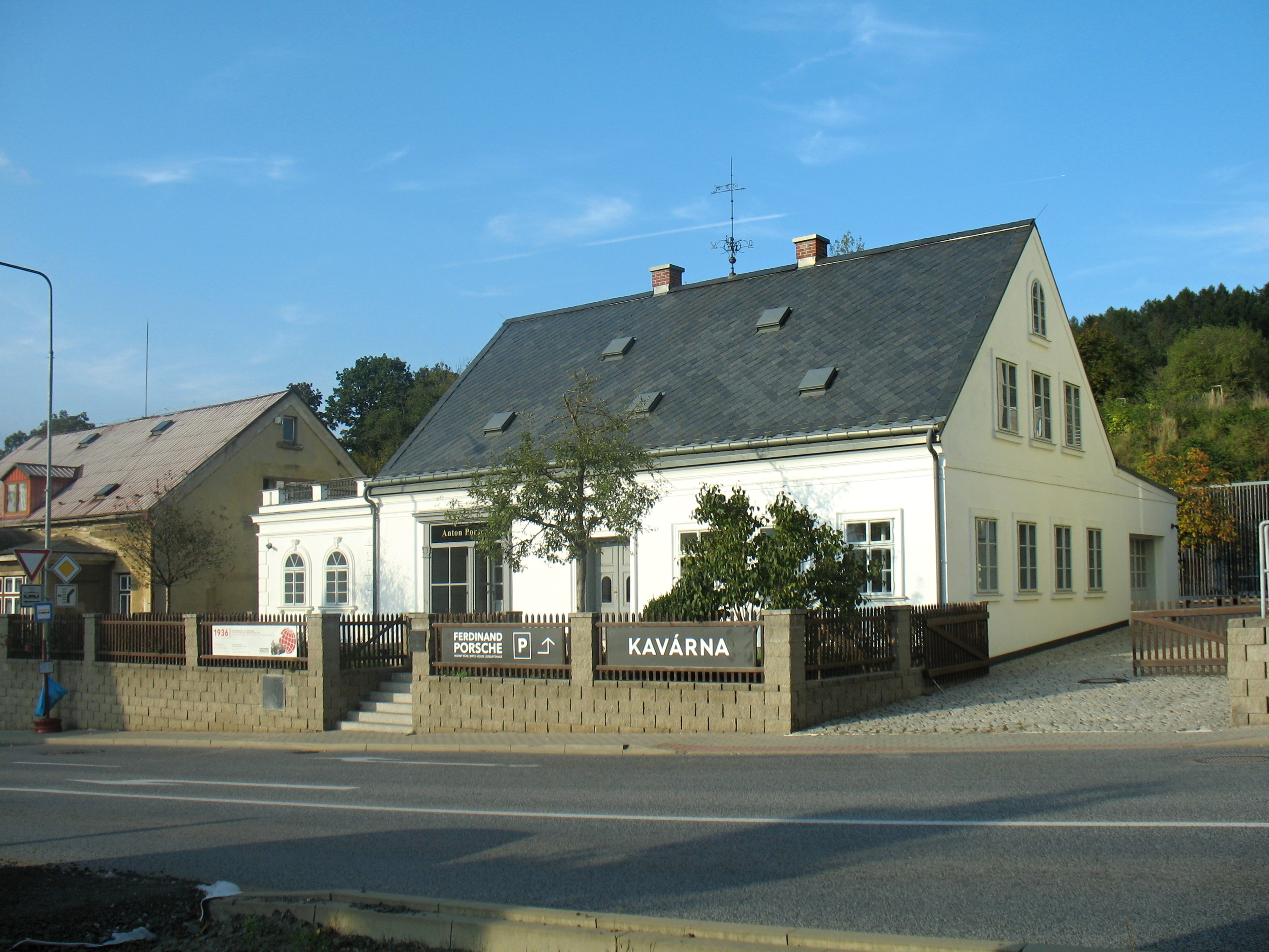
Birth house of Ferdinand Porsche in Vratislavice nad Nisou

Ferdinand Porsche was born to Anna Porsche (née Ehrlich) and Anton Porsche, in Maffersdorf (Vratislavice nad Nisou) in northern Bohemia, part of Austria-Hungary at that time, and today part of the Czech Republic. Ferdinand was his parents' third child. His father was a master panel-beater.

Ferdinand showed a great aptitude for technology and was especially intrigued by electricity from a young age. He was already attending classes at the Imperial Polytechnical College in nearby Reichenberg (Czech: Liberec), some 5 km (3 mi) from his home, at night, while still helping his father in his mechanical shop by day. Thanks to a referral, Porsche landed a job with the Béla Egger & Co. Electrical company in Vienna (later Brown Boveri, now ABB), and moved there in 1893, at age 18. While working in Vienna, he enrolled as a part-time student at what is now the Vienna University of Technology, and went there whenever he could after work. Besides attending classes there, Porsche did not complete any formal engineering education. During his five years with Béla Egger, he built their first electric wheel-hub motor, the concept for which had been developed by American inventor Wellington Adams, and Porsche also raced it, in 1897.

After the breakup of the Austro-Hungarian Empire at the end of World War I, he chose Czechoslovak citizenship. In 1934, either Adolf Hitler or Joseph Goebbels made Porsche a naturalized German citizen.

== Early career ==
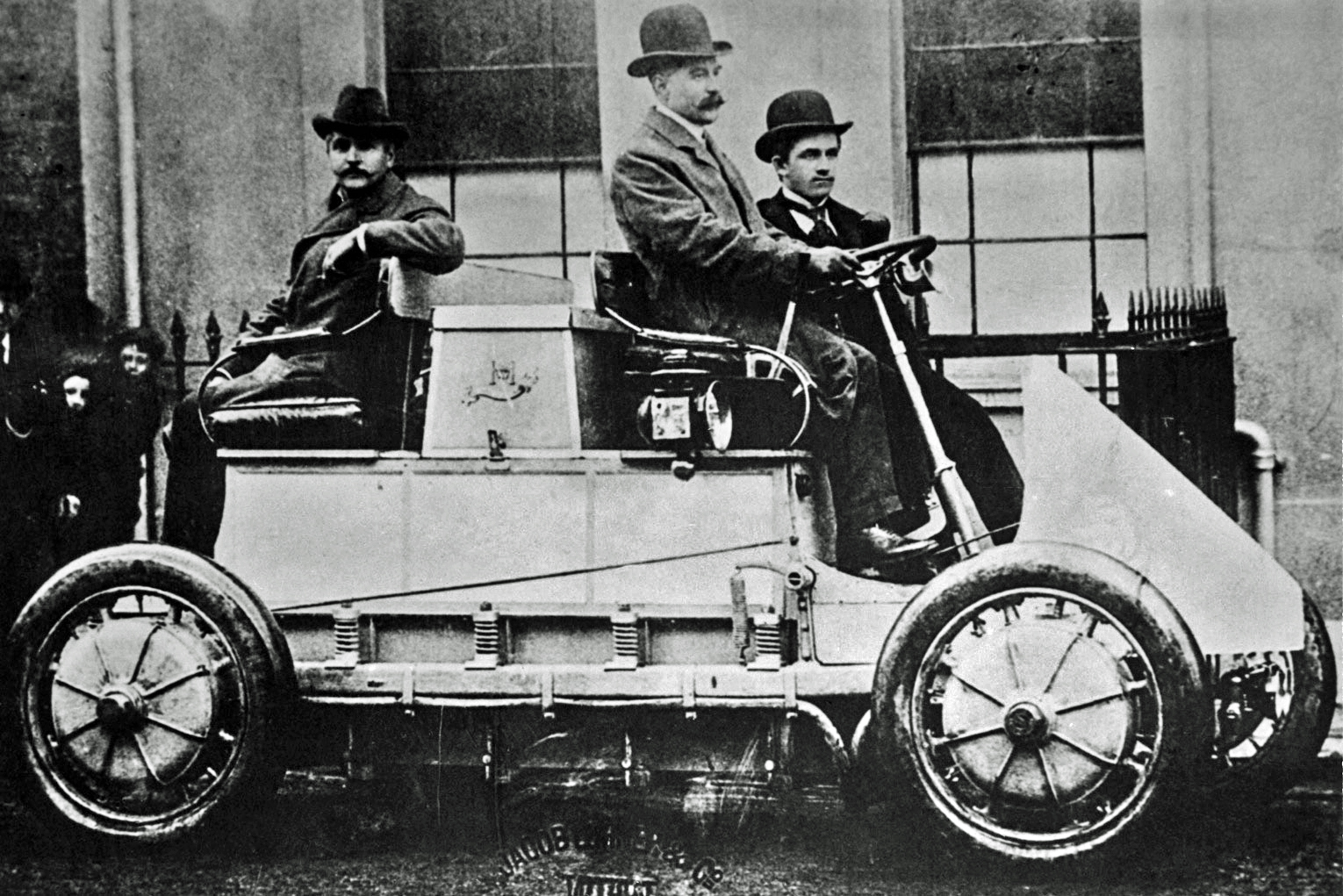
The Lohner-Porsche Mixte Hybrid

In 1897 or 1898, Porsche joined the Vienna-based factory Jakob Lohner & Company, which produced coaches for Emperor Franz Joseph I of Austria as well as for the monarchs of the UK, Sweden, and Romania. Jakob Lohner had begun construction of automobiles in 1896 under Ludwig Lohner in the trans-Danubian suburb of Floridsdorf. Their first design — unveiled in Vienna, Austria, on 26 June 1898 - was the Egger-Lohner vehicle (also referred to as the C.2 Phaeton).

The Egger-Lohner was a carriage-like car driven by two electric motors within the front wheel hubs, powered by batteries. This drivetrain construction was easily expanded to four-wheel drive by mounting two more electric motors to the rear wheels, and a four-motor example was ordered by Englishman E. W. Hart in 1900. In December that year, the car was displayed at the Paris World Exhibition under the name La Toujours Contente (the always happy one), a pun on the 1899 speed record setting La Jamais Contente. Even though this one-off vehicle had been commissioned for racing and record-breaking, its 1,800 kg (4,000 lb) of lead-acid batteries was a severe shortcoming. Though it "showed wonderful speed when it was allowed to sprint",, the weight of the batteries rendered it slow to climb hills. It also suffered from a limited range due to limited battery life.

Still employed by Lohner, Porsche introduced the "Lohner-Porsche Mixte Hybrid" in 1901: instead of a massive battery-pack, an internal combustion engine built by the German firm Daimler drove a generator which in turn drove the electric wheel hub motors. As a backup, a small battery pack was fitted. This is the first petroleum-electric hybrid vehicle on record. Since sufficiently reliable gears and couplings were not available at the time, he chose to make it a series-hybrid, an arrangement now more common in diesel-electric or turbo-electric railway locomotives than in automobiles.

Though over 300 Lohner-Porsche chassis were sold up to 1906, most of them were two-wheel drive; either front- or rear-wheel driven trucks, buses, and fire-engines. Some four-wheel-drive buses were produced, but no four-wheel-drive automobiles.

The vehicles achieved speeds of up to 56 kilometres per hour (35 mph), broke several Austrian speed records, and also won the Exelberg Rally in 1901, with Porsche himself driving a front-wheel drive hybrid. It was later upgraded with more powerful engines from Daimler and Panhard, which proved to be enough to gain more speed records. In 1905, Porsche was awarded the Pötting prize as Austria's most outstanding automotive engineer.

In 1902, he was drafted into military service. He served as a chauffeur to Archduke Franz Ferdinand, the heir presumptive to the Austro-Hungarian throne, whose assassination in 1914 is credited with contributing to the start of WWI.

1903 he married Aloisia Johanna Kaes. They had two children together. While detailed documentation of her personal life and activities is limited, it is likely that, as was customary for women of her social and historical context, she managed the household and cared for their children. Such domestic and care work would have provided stability that enabled her husband to pursue his professional and personal endeavors. Although specific evidence of her contributions is scarce, her role reflects the broader pattern of women’s unpaid labor supporting family and career in her era.

== Austro-Daimler ==
In 1906, Austro-Daimler recruited Ferdinand Porsche as their chief designer. Porsche's best-known Austro-Daimler car was designed for the Prince Henry Trial in 1910, named after Wilhelm II's younger brother Prince Heinrich of Prussia. Examples of this streamlined, 85 horsepower (63 kW) car won the first three places, and the car is still better known by the nickname "Prince Henry" than by its model name "Modell 27/80". He also created a 30 horsepower model called the Maja, named after Mercedes Jellinek's younger sister, Andrée Maja (or Maia) Jellinek.

Porsche had advanced to managing director by 1916 and received an honorary doctorate from the Vienna University of Technology in 1916: the title "Dr. Ing. h.c." is an abbreviation of "Doktor Ingenieur Honoris Causa". Porsche successfully continued to construct racing cars, winning 43 out of 53 races with his 1922 design. In 1923, Porsche left Austro-Daimler after differences ensued about the future direction of car development.

A few months later, Daimler Motoren Gesellschaft hired Porsche to serve as Technical Director in Stuttgart, Germany, which was already a major center for the German automotive industry. In 1924, he received another honorary doctorate from the Stuttgart Technical University for his work at Daimler Motoren Gesellschaft in Stuttgart and was later given the honorary title of Professor. While at Daimler Motoren Gesellschaft he came up with several very successful race car designs. The series of models equipped with superchargers that culminated in the Mercedes-Benz SSK dominated its class of motor racing in the 1920s.

In 1926, Daimler Motoren Gesellschaft and Benz & Cie merged into Daimler-Benz, with their joint products beginning to be called Mercedes-Benz. However, Porsche's idea for a small, lightweight Mercedes-Benz car was not popular with Daimler-Benz's board. He left in 1929 for Steyr Automobile, but due to the Great Depression, Porsche ended up being made redundant.

== Founding of Porsche ==
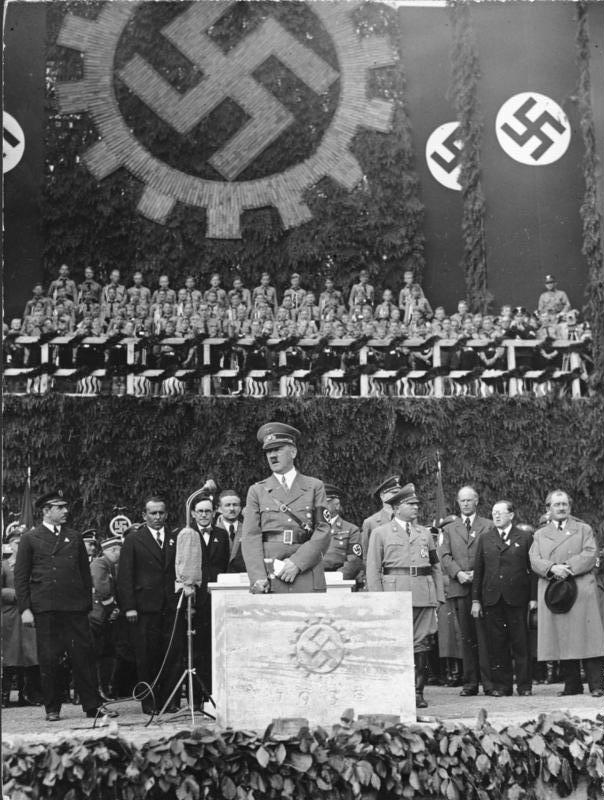
Adolf Hitler laying the foundation stone of the KDF-Wagen (Volkswagen) factory near Fallersleben (Wolfsburg) on 26 May 1938; Ferdinand Porsche at far right

In April 1931, Porsche returned to Stuttgart and founded his consulting firm Dr. Ing. h.c. F. Porsche GmbH, Konstruktionen und Beratungen für Motoren und Fahrzeugbau ('designs and consulting services for motors and vehicles'). With financial backing from his son-in-law, the Austrian attorney Anton Piëch, and Adolf Rosenberger, Porsche successfully recruited several former co-workers he had befriended at his former places of employment, including Karl Rabe, Erwin Komenda, Franz Xaver Reimspiess, and his son, Ferry Porsche.

Their first project was the design of a middle-class car for Wanderer. Other commissioned designs followed. As the business grew, Porsche decided to work on his own design as well, which was a development of the small car concept from his days at Daimler-Benz in Stuttgart. He financed the project with a loan on his life insurance. Later, Zündapp decided to help sponsor the project, but lost interest after their success with motorcycles. NSU then took over the sponsorship, but also lost interest due to the high tooling costs.

With car commissions scarce due to the depressed economic climate, Porsche founded a subsidiary company, Hochleistungs Motor GmbH ('high performance engines Ltd'), to develop a racing car for which he had no customer. Based on Max Wagner's mid-engined layout the 1923 Benz Tropfenwagen, or 'teardrop' aerodynamic design, the experimental P-Wagen project racing car ('P' stood for Porsche) was designed according to the regulations of the 750-kilogram (1,650 lb) formula. The main regulation of this formula was that the weight of the car without driver, fuel, oil, water, and tires was not allowed to exceed 750 kilograms (1,650 lb).

In 1932, Auto Union Gmbh was formed, consisting of struggling auto manufacturers Audi, DKW, Horch and Wanderer. The chairman of the Board of Directors, Baron Klaus von Oertzen, wanted a showpiece project, so at fellow director Adolf Rosenberger's insistence, von Oertzen met with Porsche, who had done work for him before.

At the 1933 Berlin Motor Show German Chancellor Adolf Hitler announced his intention to motorize the nation, with every German owning either a car or a tractor in the future, and unveiled two new programs: the "people's car", and a state-sponsored motor racing programme to develop a "high speed German automotive industry"; to facilitate this, Mercedes-Benz were to be given an annual grant of 500,000 ℛ︁ℳ︁.

=== Volkswagen Beetle and government commission ===
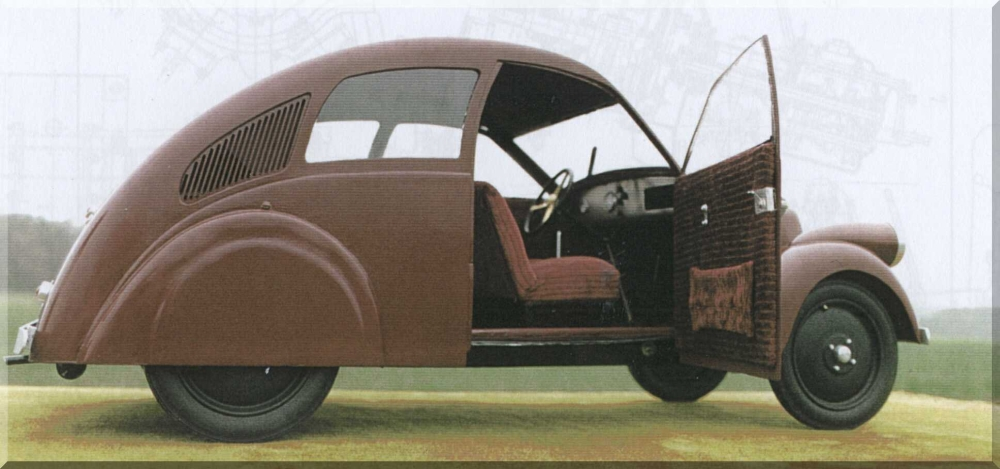
Scale model of the Porsche Type 12

In June 1934, Porsche received a contract from Hitler to design a people's car (or "Volkswagen"), following on from his previous designs such as the 1931 Type 12 car designed for Zündapp. The first two prototypes were completed in 1935. These were followed by several further pre-production batches from 1936 to 1939.

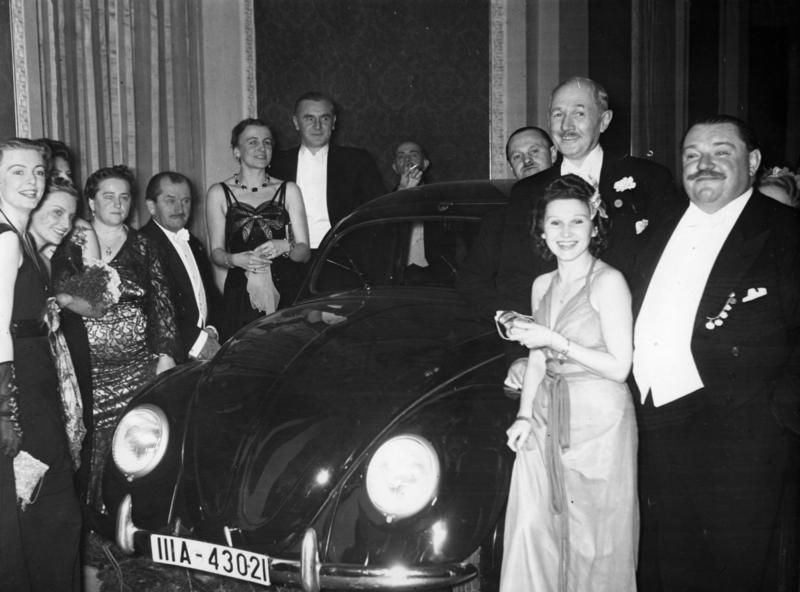
German Press Ball, January 1939. Dr. Ferdinand Porsche, fourth from the left, presents the Volkswagen tombola prize to Mrs. Elsa Ellinghausen, the lucky winner.

The car was similar to the contemporary designs of Hans Ledwinka of Tatra, in particular the Tatra V570 and Tatra 97. This resulted in a lawsuit against Porsche claiming infringement of Tatra's patents regarding air-cooling of the rear engine. The suit was interrupted by the German invasion of Czechoslovakia: several years after World War II Volkswagen paid a settlement.

Since being engaged by the National-Socialist authorities in building the Volksauto, Porsche was praised as the Great German Engineer. Hitler considered Czechs subhuman and Porsche was urged to apply for German citizenship in 1934. A few days later, he indeed filed a declaration giving up the Czechoslovak citizenship at a Czechoslovak consulate in Stuttgart. In 1937, he joined the Nazi Party (becoming member no. 5,643,287) as well as the SS. By 1938, he was using the SS as security personnel and drivers at his factory, and later set up a special unit called SS Sturmwerk Volkswagen. In 1942, he reached the rank of SS-Oberführer, and during the war, he was further decorated with the SS-Ehrenring and awarded the War Merit Cross. As the war progressed, his proposed solutions to new developments became more complex, and he gained a reputation in certain circles as a "mad scientist," especially with Albert Speer (mainly due to his newfound affinity for "pointy" designs).

A new city, "Stadt des KdF-Wagens" was founded near Fallersleben for the Volkswagen factory, but wartime production concentrated almost exclusively on the military Kübelwagen and Schwimmwagen variants. Mass production of the car, which later became known as the Beetle, began after the end of the war. The city is named Wolfsburg today and is still the headquarters of the Volkswagen Group.

=== Auto Union racing car ===
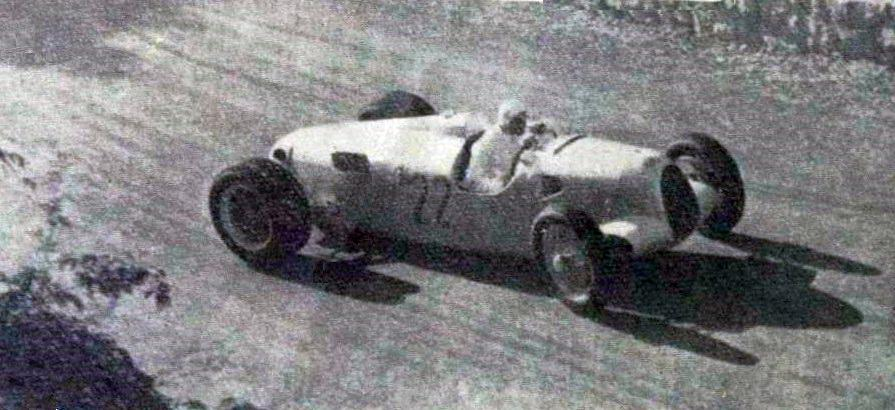
Stuck winning the 1938 La Turbie with a double rear wheel Auto Union Type C

German racing driver Hans Stuck had met Hitler before he became Chancellor, and not being able to gain a seat at Mercedes, accepted the invitation of Rosenberger to join him, von Oertzen, and Porsche in approaching the Chancellor. In a meeting in the Reich Chancellery, Hitler agreed with Porsche that for the glory of Germany, it would be better for two companies to take part in the racing car project, resulting in Hitler agreeing to split the money between Mercedes and Auto Union with 250,000 ℛ︁ℳ︁ to each company. This highly annoyed Mercedes, who had already developed their Mercedes-Benz W25, and resulted in a heated exchange both on and off the racing track between the two companies for the period until World War II.

Having obtained state funds, Auto Union bought Hochleistungs Motor GmbH and hence the P-Wagen Project for 75,000 ℛ︁ℳ︁, relocating the company to Chemnitz. As Porsche became more involved with the construction of the Wolfsburg factory, he handed over his racing projects to his son, Ferry. The dominance of the Silver Arrows of both brands was only stopped by the outbreak of World War II in 1939.

== Military vehicles ==
Adolf Hitler had discussed the possibility of military application of the Volkswagen with Porsche as early as April 1934. A Porsche brochure in 1934 said a "car must be suitable not only for personal use, but also for transport and particular military purposes." It was not until January 1938 that high-ranking Heereswaffenamt officials formally approached him about designing an inexpensive, lightweight military transport vehicle that could operate reliably both on- and off-road, in even the most extreme conditions.

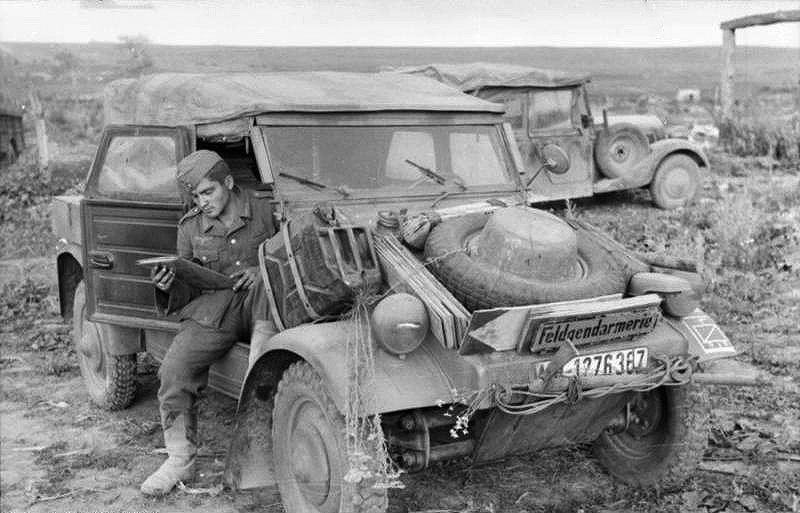
A Feldgendarmerie (military police) Kübelwagen on the Eastern Front in 1943

Full-scale production of the Type 82 Kübelwagen started in February 1940, as soon as the VW factories had become operational. When Volkswagen production ceased by the end of the war, 50,435 Kübelwagen vehicles were produced, and the vehicle proved surprisingly capable, adaptable, and durable. The Kübelwagen became a ubiquitous military implement and had a similar impact on the German army as did the jeep for the Americans.

The Volkswagen Schwimmwagen used the engine and mechanicals of the VW Type 86 four-wheel drive prototype of the Kübelwagen. Schwimmwagens were produced by the Volkswagen factory at Fallersleben (Stadt des KdF-Wagens) and Porsche's facilities in Stuttgart. 15,584 Type 166 Schwimmwagen were produced from 1941 through 1944, which makes it the most-produced amphibious car in history.

By the end of World War II, Volkswagen had built a total of 66,285 vehicles, of which 630 were for civilian use, which the Nazi elite appropriated. None of the 336,000 German citizens who completed their full down payment received a car. Their combined savings of over 380 million Reichsmark went to the war effort. In 1961, some deposit holders received a partial credit towards purchasing a new Volkswagen.

Shortly after the beginning of the war on 1 September 1939, Ferdinand Porsche was appointed chairman of the Panzerkommission, an advisory group of engineers and industrialists created by Adolf Hitler. He was removed in 1943 after his tank designs were widely considered a failure.

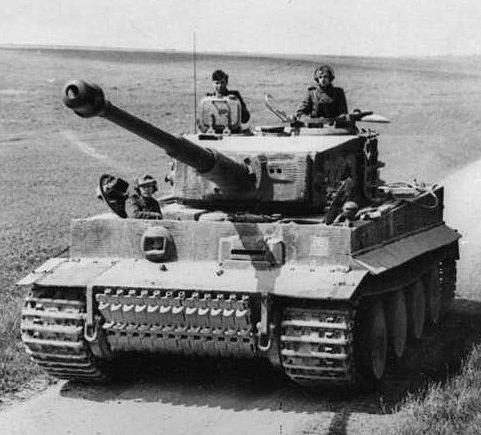
Porsche was heavily involved in the production of advanced tanks, such as the Tiger I tank.

Porsche produced two prototype, VK 30.01 (P) medium tanks to meet the German army requirement for a 30-tonne tank. This was developed into the larger VK 45.01 (P), also known as the "Tiger (P)". Due to the complex and resource intensive nature of the petro-electrical drive system, a competing design from Henschel with conventional powerplant was chosen for production instead. Ninety chassis that had already been built in the expectation of winning the contract were converted into self-propelled anti-tank guns; these were put into service in 1943 as the Panzerjäger Tiger (P) and known by the nickname "Ferdinand" before survivors were rebuilt and named Elefant

The Ferdinand was driven by a hybrid electric powertrain and was armed with a long-barreled development of the 88mm anti-aircraft gun. The most common reason for losses was that the vehicle became stuck or broke down, and so the crews often had to destroy their own vehicles to avoid allowing them to be captured. It had a kill ratio of nearly 10:1, but as with most German wartime vehicles, the lack of supplies made maintenance a serious problem, reducing the effectiveness of the vehicles and forcing crews to destroy many otherwise operational vehicles.

Porsche worked on an improved heavy tank, the VK 45.02 (P) which was also passed over for a design by Henschel

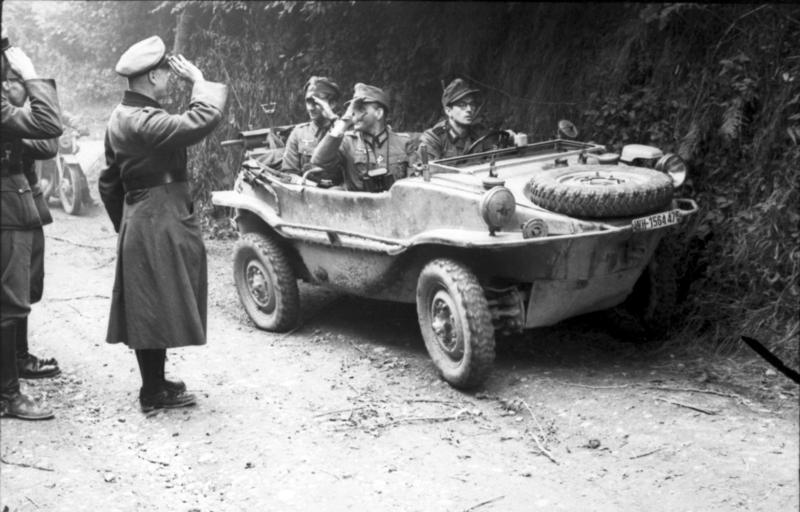
The Porsche-designed Schwimmwagen is the most-produced amphibious car in history.

Porsche also designed the Panzer VIII Maus. The development of the Maus originates from a contract given to Porsche for the design of a 100-tonne tank in March 1942. Porsche's design, known as the VK 100.01 / Porsche Type 205, was shown to Adolf Hitler in June 1942, who subsequently approved it. Only two prototypes were produced. As of 2025, it is the heaviest fully enclosed armored fighting vehicle ever built.

In November 1941, Hitler demanded that Porsche design an artillery tractor suitable for conditions on the Eastern Front. Leaning on his prior experience with the Austro-Daimler M17, Porsche submitted the Type 175. Final development and production on what became Škoda Radschlepper Ost (RSO) took place at the Škoda automobile plant in Mladá Boleslav, in what was then the Protectorate of Bohemia and Moravia. The RSO went through its first trials in 1942. Due to its poor performance, it never reached the Eastern Front. Instead, it was deployed in France, in the Netherlands, and in the Battle of the Bulge. Only 206 vehicles were built.

In late 1944, Porsche was contracted to develop a new turbojet engine for the V1 flying bomb. Although he worked on this project until the final days of the war and blueprints for the Porsche 109-005 turbojet engine were ready to be submitted, it never saw the light of day.

== After the war ==
In November 1945, Porsche was asked to continue the design of the Volkswagen in France and to move the factory equipment there as part of war reparations. Whilst in France, Porsche was also asked to consult on the design/manufacture of the upcoming Renault 4CV, which led to a serious conflict with the recently appointed head of Renault, the former resistance hero, Pierre Lefaucheux. Differences within the French government and objections from the French automotive industry put a halt to the Volkswagen project before it had even begun. On 15 December 1945, French authorities arrested Porsche, Anton Piëch, and Ferry Porsche as war criminals. While Ferry was freed after six months, Ferdinand and Anton were imprisoned first in Baden-Baden and then in Paris and Dijon.

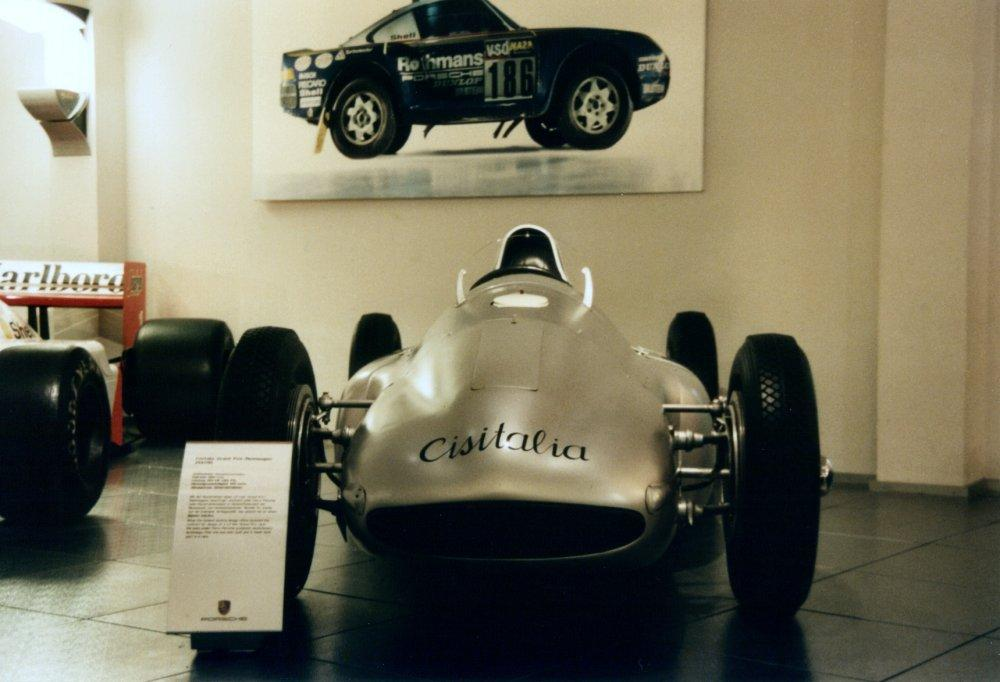
Porsche 360 Cisitalia in the old Porsche museum

While his father was in captivity, Ferry worked diligently to keep the company in business, developing a division for the repair of automobiles, water pumps, and winches. A contract with Piero Dusio was completed for a Grand Prix motor racing car, the Type 360 Cisitalia. The innovative 4WD design never raced.

The legal basis of Piëch and Porsche's imprisonment was principally Ferdinand Porsche's contribution to his country's war effort and personal friendship with Hitler. In the Porsche family's own account, the affair was a thinly veiled attempt at extorting money and forcing them to collaborate with Renault; at the same time, the family was deceptive about the use of forced labor and the size of their wartime operation. It was later shown that approximately 300 forced laborers were employed, including Poles and Russians. During the war, it was common practice for German factories of this size (about 1,000 workers) to use what was essentially slave labor, often with Slavic prisoners of war, who were frequently worked to death. The post-war French government required a payment of one million francs, variously described as ransom or bail, for the release of Piëch and Porsche. Initially unable to obtain this amount of money, the family eventually raised it through their contract with Cisitalia. During a trial, witnesses were brought forward to testify that no French prisoners had been imported to work at the plant.

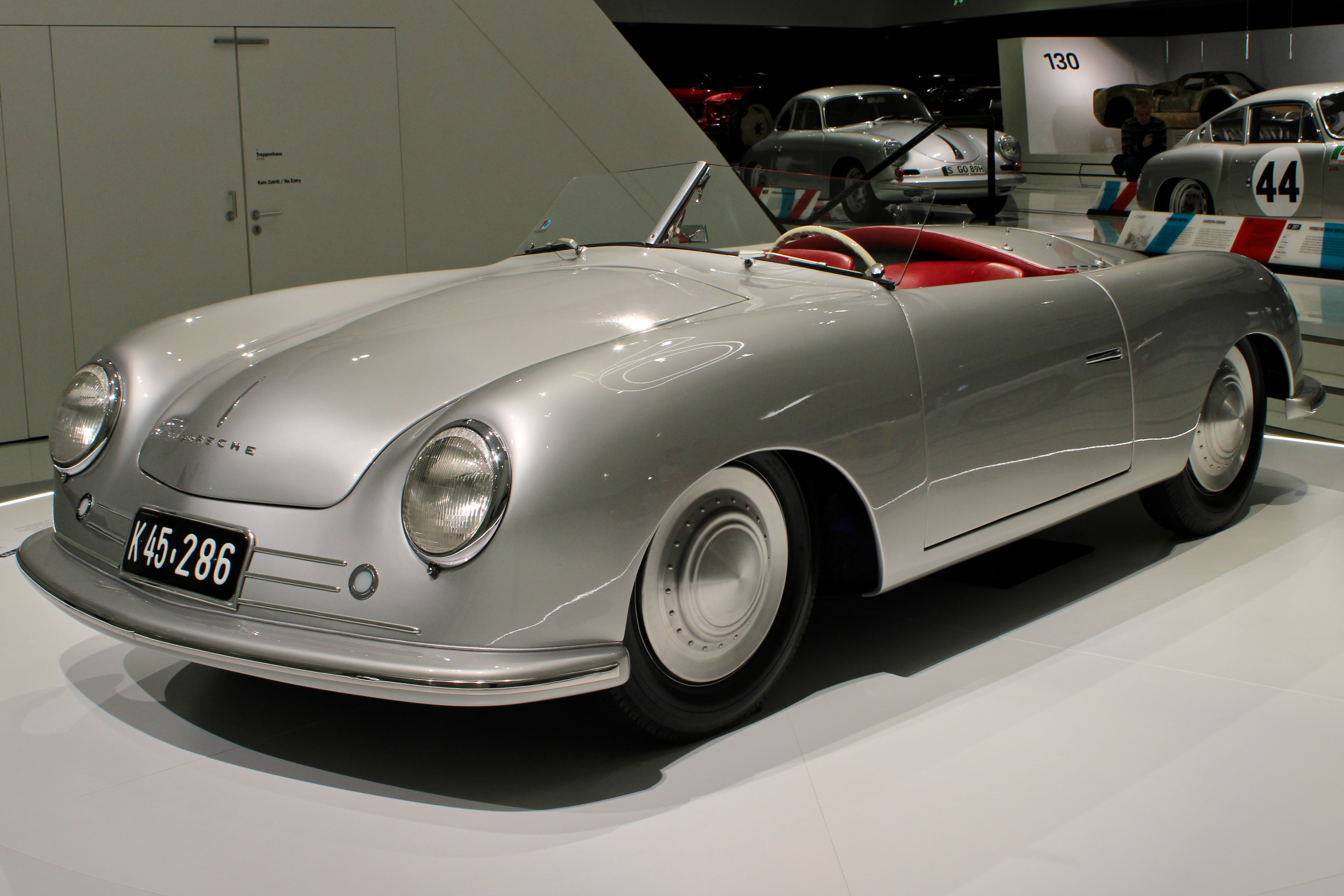
The Porsche 356/1 in the Porsche Museum

In addition to its work with Cisitalia, the company also started on a new design, the Porsche 356, the first car to carry the Porsche brand name. The company had relocated from Stuttgart to Gmünd in Carinthia to avoid Allied bombing. The company started manufacturing the Porsche 356 in an old saw mill in Gmünd. The Gmünd factory made only 49 cars, entirely by hand.

== Return to Stuttgart ==
The Porsche family returned to Stuttgart in 1949, not knowing how to restart their business. While the banks would not give them credit, as the company's plant was still under American embargo and could not serve as collateral, they did still possess considerable resources. So Ferry Porsche took one of the limited series 356 models from Gmünd and visited Volkswagen dealers to raise some orders. He asked the dealers to pay for the ordered cars in advance.

The series production version made in Stuttgart had a steel body, welded to the central-tube platform chassis, instead of the aluminium body used in the initial limited Gmünd-made series. When Ferry Porsche resurrected the company, he counted on series production figures of about 1,500. More than 78,000 Porsche 356s were manufactured in the following 17 years.

Porsche was later contracted by Volkswagen for additional consulting work and received a royalty on every Volkswagen Beetle manufactured. This provided Porsche with a comfortable income as more than 20 million Type I were built.

In November 1950, Porsche visited the Wolfsburg Volkswagen factory for the first time since the end of World War II. Porsche spent his visit chatting with Volkswagen president Heinrich Nordhoff about the future of VW Beetles, which were already being produced in large numbers.

A few weeks later, Porsche suffered a stroke. He did not fully recover and died on 30 January 1951.

In 1996, Porsche was inducted into the International Motorsports Hall of Fame and in 1999 posthumously won the award of Car Engineer of the Century.

== Views on labour ==
Porsche visited Henry Ford's operation in Detroit many times, where he learned the importance of productivity. There, he learned to monitor work. He was also surprised at how the workers and the managers treated each other as equals; even he, as a visiting dignitary, had to carry his own tray in the cafeteria and eat with the workers.

The need to increase productivity became a primary interest of Porsche's. Conventional methods for increasing productivity included longer working hours, a faster work rate, and new labor-saving techniques. Initially, the Volkswagen project was envisioned as a collaboration among existing German auto manufacturers; however, they withdrew from the project, necessitating a fresh approach with a new, comprehensive workforce. The Volkswagen plant was completed in 1938 after workers from Italy were brought in. Volkswagen, under Ferdinand Porsche, used and profited from forced labour. That included a large number of Soviets. By early 1945, German nationals comprised only 10% of Volkswagen's workforce.

== Reputation ==
Views of Ferdinand Porsche have been polarised in the postwar years. Though he was recognised and honoured for his contributions to the automotive and engineering industries, with Volkswagen Group – which his heirs control – being the second-largest car manufacturer in the world, he was also criticised for his significant involvement in the Nazi regime, having contributed to the Nazi cause through his production of military vehicles and weapons systems used during World War II.

Following protests and criminal complaints from a local World War II survivors group that Maffersdorf in the Sudetenland, known today as Vratislavice nad Nisou, was promoting Nazism by displaying signs commemorating its native son, the local authorities removed the signs in 2013. They also changed the composition of a local museum display so that it not only commemorates Porsche's automotive achievements, but also mentions his Nazi party and SS membership, and shows the importance of his work for the Nazi cause.

The local Porsche car owner association criticized the move as misguided and intended to tarnish the good name of Porsche. Porsche AG subsequently removed the show cars it had previously provided to the museum. The museum is part of Škoda, which, like Porsche AG, is a part of the Volkswagen Group. The Porsche-Piëch family, through the holding company Porsche SE, is a major shareholder and controls the majority of the Volkswagen Group's voting rights. The Porsche family representatives didn't respond to a request for comment about the controversy.

In June 2019, a documentary about Adolf Rosenberger, the Jewish co-founder of Porsche, aired on German TV. Despite Rosenberger's contributions to the German automotive industry and German auto racing, when Hitler ascended to power, Rosenberger was arrested for "Rassenschande" (racial crimes) and imprisoned at the Kislau concentration camp near Karlsruhe. Hans Baron von Veyder-Malberg, who succeeded Rosenberger at Porsche, intervened with the Gestapo and affected his release after three months of imprisonment. Rosenberger had to leave Germany, and his ownership stake was subject to "Aryanization", a Nazi policy that was part of the broader persecution of Jews. That allowed Ferdinand Porsche and Anton Piëch to acquire Rosenberger's stake in the company at nominal value, well below its worth. Although Porsche and Piëch settled with Rosenberger after the war, his founding role was never fully recognized. Rosenberger's 10% stake in Porsche would have made him a billionaire.

In December 2022, the city council of Linz, a city in Austria, formally renamed "Porscheweg" ("Porsche Road") due to Porsche's central role in the Nazi war economy. Porsche AG told the Kurier newspaper that it did not support the renaming.

== See also ==
- Arthur Constantin Krebs, managing director of Panhard, with whom Ferdinand Porsche designed a hybrid car.
