= Lohner =

Lohner may refer to:

== People with the surname ==
- Caleb Lohner (born 2001), American football and basketball player
- Danny Lohner (born 1970), American rock musician
- Elena Lohner (born 2001), Liechtensteiner footballer
- Harold Lohner (born 1958), American designer
- Helmuth Lohner (1933–2015), Austrian actor
- Henning Lohner (born 1961), German film score composer
- Ludwig Lohner (1858–1925), Austrian entrepreneur, son of Jakob Lohner

== Technology ==
- Lohner-Werke, traditional Austro-Hungarian coach, car and aircraft manufacturer in Vienna, today Bombardier Wien Schienenfahrzeuge
- Lohner–Porsche, an early (1900s) hybrid vehicle

== Geography ==
- Lohner (mountain), a Swiss mountain
