= Kummersdorf =

Former military establishment in Germany

Coordinates: 52.0971°N 13.3571°E

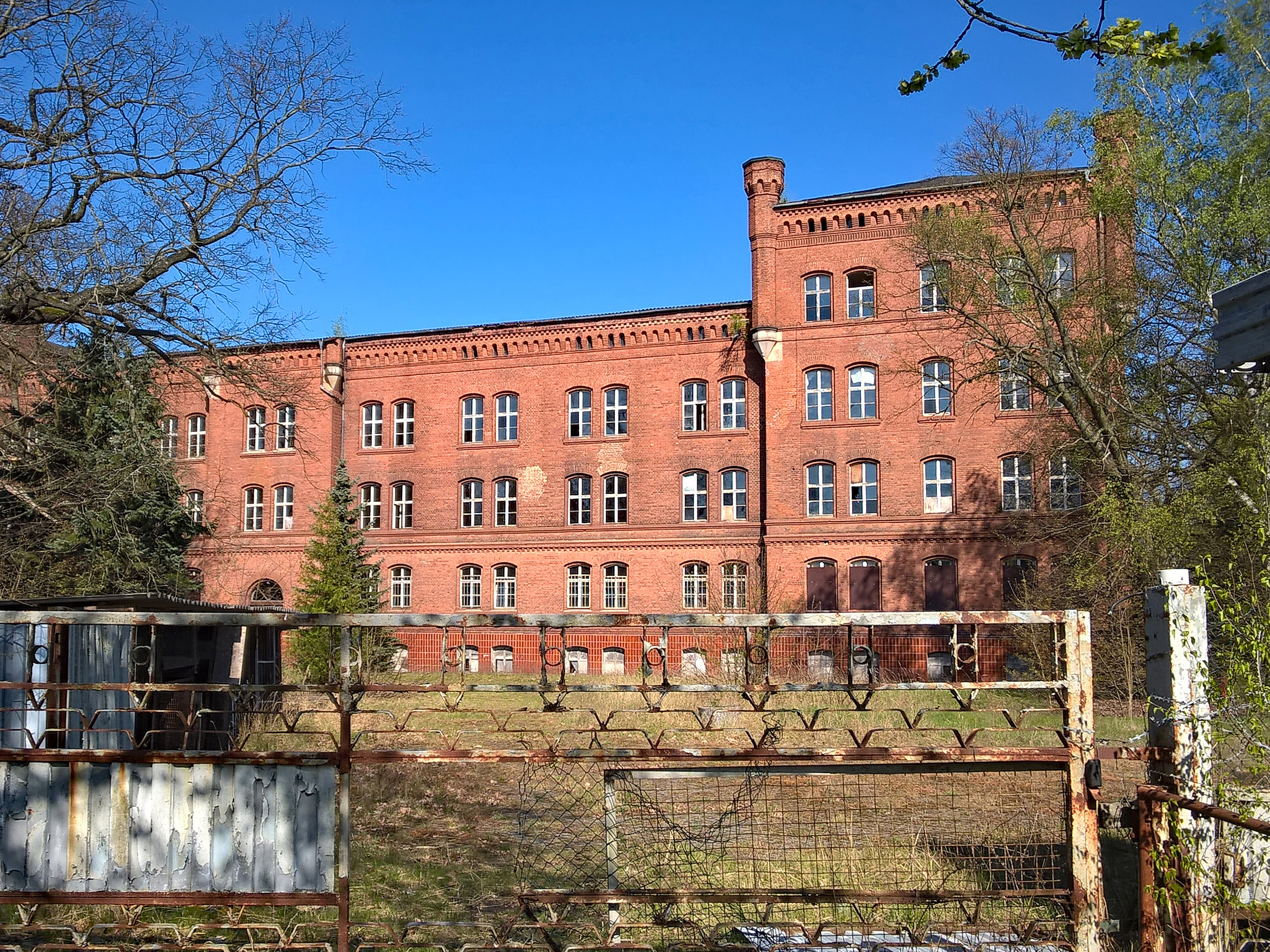
Barracks ruins in Kummersdorf Gut in Brandenburg

Kummersdorf (German pronunciation: [ˈkʊmɐsdɔʁf]) is the name of an estate near Luckenwalde, around 25 km south of Berlin, in the Brandenburg region of Germany. Until 1945 Kummersdorf hosted the weapon office of the German Army which ran a development centre for future weapons as well as an artillery range.

== Early history ==
In 1871, the Prussian ministry of war decided to move the artillery test range at Tegel to the Kummersdorf Forest. The new range became operational on 15 October 1875 when it was connected with the Royal Prussian Military Railway. In 1880, the first firing experiments took place on the 12 km southeast-northwest firing range. These experiments investigated the effectiveness of various fortifications, and the effects of weapons and projectiles. Total size of the Kummersdorf Firing Range was 878.1 hectares. In 1913, the dropping of bombs from the LZ 13 Hansa airship and Wright biplanes was investigated. In the 1920s, secret development started in the areas of artillery, armored forces, motor vehicles, signals technology and aviation. On 21 September 1933, Hitler visited for the first time.

== Aircraft and rocket history ==
In 1929, the German Minister of National Defense undertook research into the use of rocket propulsion for military purposes, and responsibility for rocket development was assigned to the Ballistics Branch of the Army Weapons Department. Walter Dornberger joined that branch in 1930. They built a test stand for liquid-propellant rockets, Experimental Station West, at Kummersdorf in December 1932. Dornberger, Walter Riedel, and Wernher von Braun tested their first rocket motor on 21 December, using liquid oxygen and 75% ethyl alcohol. Arthur Rudolph joined the organization, and work started on the Aggregate 1 (A-1), which was to be a complete missile, but then development moved on to the A-2. They used a wind tunnel to determine stable flight configurations, starting from zero through to supersonic speeds. In December 1934, the first two A2s were successfully launched from the North Sea island of Borkum.

The first casualties in rocket development occurred in March 1934, when Dr. Wahmke and 2 assistants were killed, and another assistant was injured. A propellant fuel tank exploded, while experimenting with mixing 90% hydrogen peroxide and alcohol, before combustion.

In 1935, work commenced on using rocket motors to power aircraft. In 1936, a rocket motor was installed in tail of a Heinkel He 112, with 90 seconds worth of fuel. Flight tests (now also supported by the Luftwaffe) were carried out at Neuhardenberg (a large field about 70 kilometres east of Berlin, listed as a reserve airfield in the event of war). On 3 June 1937 the Heinkel He 112 was flown by test pilot Erich Warsitz, propelled by rocket power alone, despite the wheels-up landing and having the fuselage on fire due to an unpredicted area of low aerodynamic pressure drawing alcohol fumes back into the airframe which then ignited.

In May 1937, Dornberger, and most of his staff, moved to Peenemünde on the island of Usedom on the Baltic coast which offered much greater space and secrecy. Dr. Thiel and his staff followed in the summer of 1940. Test Stand VI at Pennemünde was an exact replica to Kummersdorf's large test stand.

Hitler visited Kummersdorf West in March 1939, accompanied by Walther von Brauchitsch, witnessing the test firing of the 650 and 2200 pound thrust rocket motors, and viewed components of the A-3 and A-5. He also enquired how long it would take to develop the A-4. Hitler was skeptical of the rocket's potential.

After 1938 Kummersdorf was used for nuclear research.

== Armored fighting vehicle history ==
Kummersdorf was also the location for the analyses, studies and testing of various German-captured Allied tanks and armoured fighting vehicles (AFVs). Many tanks from all combat-fronts, from North Africa to the Eastern Front, were tested there, with American tanks being multiple variant-models of the M4 Sherman tank, the M3 Lee, the M10 tank destroyer, amongst several others, and Soviet tanks consisting of the T-34 (the mainstay of Soviet armoured forces) and the T-28 medium tanks, the SU-series of self-propelled artillery/guns (such as the SU-85) and the IS-2 heavy tank, just to list a few. There were also British tanks there, including a Churchill tank fitted with a Y-shaped exhaust outlet (an early variant-model of the Churchill) for deep-wading and amphibious operations which was used at the Dieppe Raid, along with many Matilda I and Matilda II infantry tanks (with the former being largely seized following the evacuation of Allied troops at Dunkirk and the latter from both Dunkirk as well as in North Africa). There were also many French tanks there as well, such as the Char B1 heavy tank. Also, an Italian Carro Armato P40 heavy tank was present at Kummersdorf.

The Wehrmacht also tested new German tanks there, including the VK 4501 (P) (the losing Porsche-hulled competitor for the Tiger I production contract), the Hetzer tank destroyer, the Panzer V Panther medium tank, the Tiger II heavy tank, possibly the VK 4502 (P), and the 188-tonne Panzerkampfwagen Maus super-heavy tank.

Albert Speer refers to the tanks testing station at Kummersdorf during the 1942 offensive against the Soviet Union. The station showed that the treads or motor of a heavy tank need repairs every 400–500 miles. This was a limiting factor in the offensive as supply lines became stretched and spare parts carried by the tanks were consumed.

In late 1944, a unit was formed, and at a meeting in the Fuhrer's headquarters it was referred to as tank company "Kummersdorf". This unit consisted of three tank platoons (mostly still mobile), one recon platoon of armored vehicles, an infantry (Grenadier) platoon and one tank platoon, consisting of a Tiger II, a single Jagdtiger heavy tank destroyer, two American Shermans, the Carro Armato P 40 Heavy Tank and several Borgward IVs armed with machine guns. According to a Telex on April 4, 1945, at least part of a tank company should have been transferred to the district of Dresden. Non-mobile equipment, including a VK 4501 (P) took part in combat south-east of Kummersdorf, where they and workers, civilians and other people at the facility were thrown together to make a makeshift grenadier unit. By the battles end, the VK 4501 (P) had destroyed a single T-34 and the Grenadiers had destroyed several others, a nearby 88 mm (8.8 cm) flak gun destroyed another advancing T-34. The entire unit failed in their mission and dispersed into the nearby woods.

Another tank unit was formed at Kummersdorf and participated in combat on April 21, 1945. The fighting took place to the south in the direction of Baruth, with the objective of stopping the 1st Ukrainian Front, coming from the direction of Golßen. Joining up with Battle Group Käther with 43 vehicles, including one Panzer V Panther. During the fighting near the settlement of Baruth, the entire unit was destroyed by the Russian forces.

The fate of the tanks left at the facility is unknown, though some information suggests that several American made tanks were sent to Panzer Brigade 150, being used in Operation Greif. A T-35 Heavy Tank became a member of Combat Group Ritter, who fought in the area of Zossen, it was quickly knocked out in combat. It is also believed that a Renault Char D2 saw combat in the Zossen area. There is also a photo of knocked out British Cruiser tanks sitting next to a knocked out Panther, which was taken on the outskirts of Berlin, these were believed to be from Kummersdorf. On March 9, 1945 the commander of Army Group Vistula signed the order for all tanks still at Kummersdorf to be sent away in parts to the occupying defences around Stettin. What became of these tanks is still unknown.

== See also ==
- Walter Dornberger
- Erich Warsitz
- Peenemünde
- Usedom
- Aggregate 1
- Maus Tank
- Berlin
- Operation Greif

== Bibliography ==
- Lutz Warsitz: THE FIRST JET PILOT - The Story of German Test Pilot Erich Warsitz, Pen and Sword Books Ltd., England, 2009, ISBN 978-1-84415-818-8,
