= Ludwig Lohner =

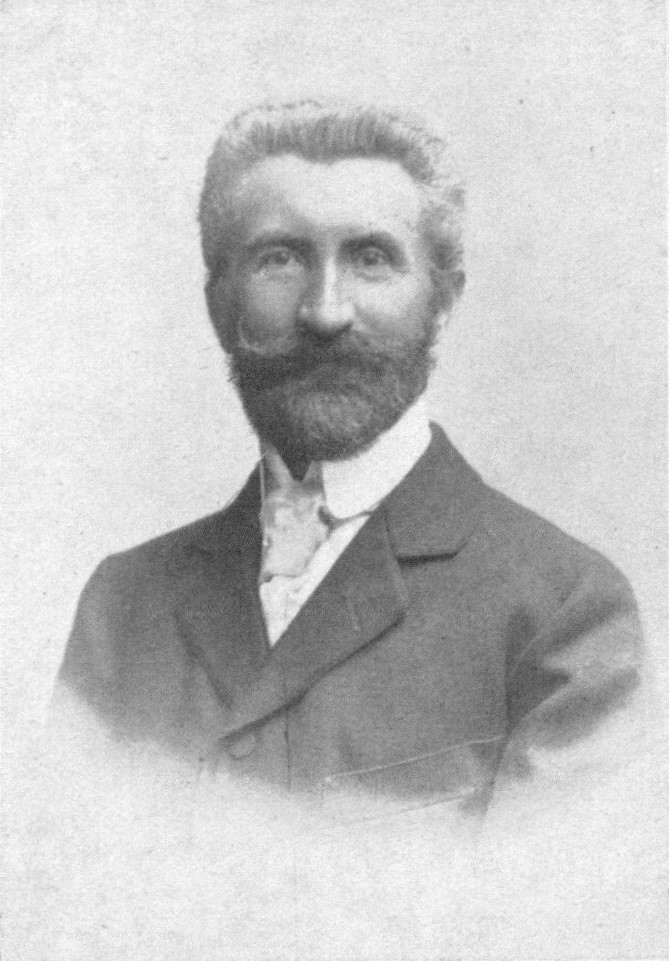
Ludwig Lohner, c. 1910

Ludwig Lohner (15 July 1858 – 14 July 1925) ran his family's company as it became one of the first manufacturers of cars and airplanes in Austria-Hungary.

== Life and work ==
Lohner studied mechanical engineering at the Vienna University of Technology from 1875 to 1880. In 1887 he took over the management of his father's carriage company, Jacob Lohner & Company, and inherited it when his father died in 1892.

In 1897, the company began manufacturing electric automobiles. Lohner hired Ferdinand Porsche in 1898, and with him developed the Lohner Porsche which was popular at the 1900 World Exposition in Paris. The partnership went on to develop mixed gasoline-electric drive cars.

In 1909 Lohner decided the company should make airplanes. With technical manager Karl Paulal he built a glider in April 1909 then began to invest in making powered aircraft with a 40-hp Anzani engine.

== Bibliography ==
- Erwin Steinböck. 1984. Lohner zu Land, zu Wasser und in der Luft: die Geschichte eines industriellen Familienunternehmens von 1823-1970. H. Weishaupt. (In German)
