= VK 45.02 (P) =

German heavy tank project of World War II

- VK 45.02 (P) Ausf. B (version with rear-mounted turret)
- Type: Heavy tank
- Place of origin: Nazi Germany

Production history
- Manufacturer: Porsche
- No. built: 3 versions of the Hinten

Specifications
- Mass: 57 tonnes (63 short tons; 56 long tons)
- Length: 10.71 m (35 ft 2 in)
- Width: 3.32 m (10 ft 11 in)
- Height: 2.95 m (9 ft 8 in)
- Crew: 5
- Armor: 70–120 millimetres (2.8–4.7 in)
- Main armament: 8.8 cm KwK 43 L/71
- Secondary armament: 2 x 7.92 mm MG 34
- Engine: 2 Porsche Typ 101/3; 680 PS (500 kW; 670 hp)
- Suspension: Torsion bar
- Maximum speed: 38 km/h (24 mph)

The VK 45.02 (P) was the official designation for an unsuccessful heavy tank project designed by Ferdinand Porsche in Nazi Germany during World War II to compete with Henschel's design.

Development of this vehicle started in April 1942, with two design variants (Ausf. A and Ausf. B) incorporating different features. The Krupp company received an order for construction of 50 turrets. However, the prototype hull was never manufactured. The turrets were mounted on the first Tiger IIs, which were supposed to be armed with a KwK L/71 gun, like its Henschel counterpart.

== Turret Design ==
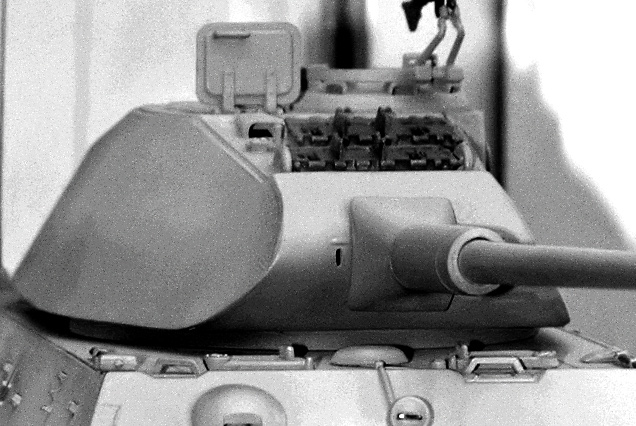
A model depicting the curved front of the first version of the Krupp turret (erroneously called "Porsche turret")

Two turret designs were used in the production vehicles. Both of the Tiger II turrets were original Krupp designs. The first order to Krupp, for 50 original design turrets, was for use with the Porsche prototype hull (VK 45.02 (P))—before Porsche's hull cancellation in November 1942—and the later Krupp simplified design was only used on the Henschel hull (VK 45.03 (H)). While Henschel's design work started in the late summer/fall of 1942, the key moment where they effectively won the contract and received the authority to proceed was in November 1942 after Porsche's cancellation.

The initial design is often misleadingly called the "Porsche" turret due to the misbelief that it was designed by Porsche for their Tiger II prototype; in fact it was the initial Krupp design for both prototypes. This turret had a rounded front and steeply sloped sides, with a difficult-to-manufacture curved bulge on the turret's left side to accommodate the commander's cupola. Fifty early turrets were mounted to Henschel hulls and used in action. In December 1943 the more common "production" turret, sometimes erroneously called the "Henschel" turret, was simplified with a significantly thicker flat face (which eliminated the shot trap caused by the curved face of the earlier turret), and less-steeply sloped sides, which avoided the need for a bulge for the commander's cupola, and added additional room for ammunition storage.

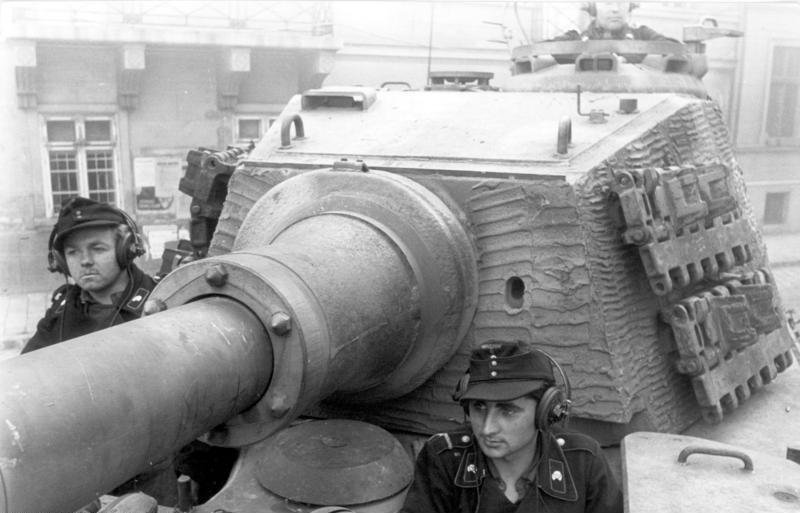
The angular front of the "production turret" designed by Krupp (erroneously called "Henschel turret") taken during Operation Panzerfaust in Budapest, 15 October 1944. The rough Zimmerit coating is evident, used to prevent magnetic mines from adhering to the tank's armour.

The turrets were designed to mount the 8.8 cm KwK 43 L/71 gun.

== Conception of hull design ==
After the VK 45.01 (P) design (unofficially labeled Tiger (P) or Porsche Tiger) lost the contract July 1942 to the competitor's design, the VK 45.01 (H) from Henschel, Porsche immediately began seeking ways to improve the design for a future tank version. An analysis of the latest Allied tank models made it clear that simply increasing the armor on the existing design would not be enough for the tank to remain competitive; it required both increasing the armor for **more weight** and a better power plant/pack for **more maneuverability**.

What initially began as a single vehicle, designated in the Porsche design office as "**Typ 180**," evolved into a series of five different vehicles. This required the development of two distinct hull configurations: the **Hinten** (rear) with its turret at the back, and the **Vorne** (front) with its turret placed forward. Both versions utilized an electric drive system and a hydraulic motor, along with the development of four different engine types. The overall project came to be known as the **VK 45.02 (P)**.

- **Typ 180A**: Electric drive with Porsche Type 101/3 gasoline engines.
- **Typ 180B**: Electric drive with Porsche Type 101/4 gasoline engines.
- **Typ 181A**: Voith II hydraulic drive with Porsche Type 101/3 gasoline engines.
- **Typ 181B**: Voith II hydraulic drive with Porsche Deutz Type 180/1 diesel engines.
- **Typ 181C**: Voith II hydraulic drive with Porsche Deutz Type 180/2 diesel engines.

=== Porsche engine type numbering ===
Ferdinand Porsche founded his company Dr. Ing. h.c. F. Porsche GmbH, Konstruktionen und Beratungen für Motoren und Fahrzeugbau (Porsche) in April 1931 in Stuttgart. The company established a numeric record of projects known as the Type List. Initially, the list was maintained by Karl Rabe. The first number was Type 7, chosen so that Wanderer-Werke AG did not realize they were the company's first customer.

The first entries in the list are designs by Ferdinand Porsche before the company was founded and therefore these do not have a Type number. The designs up to number 287 are from the period leading into World War II when the company was based in Stuttgart. Type number 288 is the first of the Gmünd period where the company was relocated as part of the program to disperse companies outside big cities to prevent damage from the Allied strategic bombing campaign.

Porsche Type Numbers
Type Number	Year	Description
100	1939–1941	VK 30.01 (P) medium tank prototype
101	1942	VK 45.01 (P) prototype for Tiger I. Heavy tank with the 8.8 cm Kwk 36 L/56 gun and petrol-electric transmission. The produced chassis were rebuilt as Elefant tank destroyers.
101/2		The 101 engine with two additional fans placed over the generator to resolve bubbling of the coolant oil and distributor shaft overheating
101/3		Gasoline engine, used in the electric-drive Typ 180A and hydraulic-drive Typ 181A variants)
101/4		Gasoline engine, used in the electric-drive Typ 180B variant
102	1942	Type 101 Tiger tank with Voith electric transmission
103	1942	Type 101 Tiger tank with Voith hydraulic transmission
117	1942	Experimental one cylinder engine for Type 101
119	1942	Experimental one cylinder engine for Type 101
130	1942	Experimental engine for Type 101. V10 water-cooled 19.3L 400PS TypeA
131	1942	Experimental engine for Type 102. V10 water-cooled 19.3L TypeB
158	1942	One cylinder diesel test engine with direct injection for Type 101
159	1942	One cylinder diesel test engine with "Simmering" pre-combustion chamber injection for Type 101
180	1942	VK 45.02 (P) tank design with petrol engine and electric transmission. Lost out to Henschel Tiger II
181	1942	Hydraulic transmission for Type 180
190	1942	Experimental engine for Type 101. V10 air-cooled 16.4L pre-combustion chamber injection diesel engine
191	1942	One cylinder diesel test engine for Type 190. air-cooled pre-combustion chamber injection diesel engine
192	1942	One cylinder test engine for Type 203
193	1942	One cylinder gasoline test engine for Type 101. air-cooled fuel injection gasoline engine
200	1942	Air-cooled 10L Diesel engine for Type 100
203	1942	36.6L Air-cooled X-16 cylinder (four banks of four cylinders on a single crankshaft) Diesel engine
205	1942	VK 100.01 Maus, 188-ton tank prototype
205/2		Proposed 41.4 L Air-cooled Diesel engine, superseded by Porsche Type 212
213	1942	Experimental engine. 3L one cylinder air-cooled diesel engine
