= Klaus von Oertzen =

Klaus-Detlof von Oertzen (13 April 1894 – 25 July 1991) was a German businessman and aristocrat. He was involved in the motor industry for most of his long life and is sometimes referred to as the “Father of Volkswagen of South Africa”.

== Life ==
Klaus-Detlof von Oertzen was born on 13 April 1894 in Hohensalza as the son of Victor Sigismund von Oertzen (1844-1915), a landowner and Prussian official who served as Landrat of Kreis Hohensalza from 1889 to 1898.

At the beginning of World War I, Klaus-Detlof was a Fahnenjunker (officer candidate) in the Prussian Army's 1st Pomeranian Field Artillery Regiment No. 2 (1. Pommersches Feldartillerie-Regiment Nr. 2). He was promoted to Fähnrich on 14 January 1915 and to Leutnant on 27 January 1915. He later transferred to the Luftstreitkräfte, the Imperial German Air Service, and was trained as a military pilot. After World War I, he left the Army as an Oberleutnant. He was decorated with the Iron Cross 1st and 2nd Classes and the Mecklenburg-Schwerin Military Merit Cross 1st and 2nd Classes.

After the war, Oertzen turned to business pursuits. By 1928, he was a business director and board member of Wanderer-Werke A.G., a German manufacturer of bicycles, motorcycles, automobiles, vans and other machinery.

During 1932, four motor manufacturers of Saxony in Germany, namely Audi, DKW, Horch and Wanderer, amalgamated under the pressures of the depressed German economy to form Auto Union. The new company’s four-ringed emblem, which Oertzen suggested, can still be seen in the modern Audi logo. Oertzen, who had been in charge of sales at Wanderer, became sales director and chairman of the board of directors of Auto Union.

Oertzen wanted a showpiece project that would bring fame to his new firm. Together with Ferdinand Porsche and Hans Stuck (senior), one of Germany’s most successful racing drivers, they began work on a new “people’s car” and also a government-sponsored racing programme. Initially a sum of 500,000 ℛ︁ℳ︁ was pledged to Mercedes-Benz, but Dr. Porsche was able to convince the government that two programmes were better than one, and the 500,000 ℛ︁ℳ︁ would be split by the two competing firms. Mercedes-Benz was not pleased at this turn of events and a great rivalry began on the race circuits.

Oertzen became uneasy in pre-war Germany and in 1935 decided to relocate to South Africa. From 1936 he initiated the export of the DKW saloon car to South Africa and Australia and in 1937 he arranged for the Auto Union Grand Prix racing cars to be brought out to South Africa for promotional purposes. They competed in Cape Town and East London.

In addition to South Africa and Australia, Oertzen also worked in Indonesia, where he and his wife, Irene, were interned in separate prison camps during the Second World War.

After the war, Volkswagen in Germany appointed him as their representative in South Africa. He was instrumental in the early stages of negotiations to bring Volkswagen to South Africa, and was present at the historic signing in 1951 of the agreement between SAMAD and Volkswagenwerk to assemble Volkswagens in Uitenhage. He became Chairman of SAMAD in 1956 when Volkswagenwerk took over a controlling interest in the company.

The first Kombi in South Africa, a gift to a German malaria researcher who had to traverse southern and central Africa, landed in Cape Town in December 1952. Soon afterwards, a second Kombi, fitted out as a hunting vehicle/ camper for Baron von Oertzen, arrived in Port Elizabeth. The owners tested both vehicles to their limits across the most inhospitable terrain. In 1956, Ben Pon, the Dutch Volkswagen dealer who could be regarded as the architect of the Kombi, visited South Africa as guest of von Oertzen. Being keen hunters, the men conducted several expeditions in von Oertzen’s Jagdwagen Kombi. (This vehicle still exists and can be seen in the new modern VWSA museum called the AutoPavilion, next to the factory entrance in Uitenhage).

Klaus-Detlof von Oertzen died on 25 July 1991 in Pully, Canton Vaud, Switzerland.

His wife in her later years divided her time between Johannesburg and Switzerland. She was a guest of honour at the opening of the AutoPavilion in 2004. She died in April, 2007
