= Franz Xaver Reimspieß =

Austrian engineer (1900–1979)

Franz Xaver Reimspieß (1900-1979) was an Austrian engineer. He was born in Wiener Neustadt in Austria.

In 1915 he began his training as an engineering draughtsman with Austro-Daimler. At the end of the 1920s, after completing his engineering studies, he designed the Daimler armoured car. Franz Xaver Reimspieß was remarkable for his precise work and his wealth of ideas. In 1934 he joined the Porsche construction office and developed the air-cooled opposed four-cylinder engine for the Volkswagen basing his design on Kales’s opposed four-cylinder engine for the NSU prototype. For the Auto Union P racing car Reimspiess designed new brakes and altered the rear axle to shaft suspension.

During the war Reimspieß was chief designer at the tank development centre within the Nibelungen plant at St Valentin. Thus the plans for the German 'Tiger' tank originated from Reimspieß. Then at Porsche he was in charge of undercarriage design, a position which he held until his retirement in 1966.

At Porsche Reimspieß patented around ten inventions for the independent wheel-suspension system and for engines. His most famous patent applications were related to his inventions for the Volkswagen engine.

It is claimed that Reimspieß designed the Volkswagen logo and received a one-off payment of one hundred Reichsmark for his design. However, competing claims assert that the logo was created by graphic designer Nikolai Borg or the German artist Martin Freyer.
