= Karl Rabe =

Karl Rabe (29 October 1895 – 28 October 1968) was an automobile designer and was the chief designer at Porsche. He helped Ferdinand Porsche to develop the Porsche's transmissions. He kept a detailed diary while working for Porsche, which has aided historians. He was born in Pottendorf, Austria.
