= VK 30.01 (P) =

German heavy tank prototype

- Type: Heavy tank
- Place of origin: Nazi Germany

Production history
- Manufacturer: Porsche
- No. built: 2 turretless prototypes

Specifications
- Mass: 30 t (30 long tons; 33 short tons)
- Length: 6.58 m (21 ft 7 in)
- Width: 3.05 m (10 ft)
- Height: 2.8 m (9 ft 2 in)
- Crew: 5 (Gunner, Loader, Commander, Driver, Radio Operator)
- Armor: 40–80 mm (1.6–3.1 in)
- Main armament: 1 × 7.5 cm (3.0 in) or 10.5 cm (4.1 in) or 8.8 cm (3.5 in) gun
- Secondary armament: 1 × 7.92 mm (0.312 in) MG 34 machine gun
- Engine: 2 × V10 petrol engines 210 PS (210 hp) per engine, 420 PS total
- Power/weight: 14 PS/tonne
- Suspension: Longitudinal torsion bars
- Maximum speed: 60 km/h (37 mph)

The VK 30.01 (P) was the official designation for a World War II German heavy tank. Only two prototype chassis were built by Porsche. The tank never entered serial production but was further developed into the VK 45.01 Tiger (P). Porsche called it the Typ (type) 100.

== Beginnings of the VK 30.01 (P) ==
At the beginning of 1937, the Weapon Testing Office (Wa Prüf 6) of the German Army's Ordnance Office (Heereswaffenamt) contracted with Henschel & Son (chassis) and Krupp (turret) for a 30 t (29.5 long tons; 33.1 short tons) heavy breakthrough (Durchbruchswagen) tank with 50 mm (2 in) thick armor on the front and sides of the hull and the turret. The turret was to be based on that of the Panzer IV and was to use the same 24-caliber long 7.5 cm (3 in) KwK 37 gun. Development proceeded slowly and only two chassis and one turret had been delivered by mid-1939. The program was later renamed as VK 30 (Note: VK from the German Vollketten "fully tracked"; '30' for the approximate weight of 30 tonnes; and the final 2 digits xx denoting 1st/2nd/3rd design from the respective manufacturer. The letter in brackets denotes manufacturer.) and were developed to varying degrees by four different companies: Porsche, Henschel, MAN, and Daimler Benz. The Porsche version was named the VK 30.01 (P). and the Henschel design was the VK 30.01 (H).

== Development ==
Shortly after the beginning of the war on 1 September 1939, Ferdinand Porsche was appointed chairman of the Panzerkommission (an advisory group of engineers and industrialists created by Adolf Hitler to advise him on future tank designs). Through his membership in the group, Porsche likely became aware that Daimler-Benz had received permission to design a tank outside the normal process where the design office issued specifications that designers had to meet in October. He decided to do the same for the VK 30 program in December using his preferred air-cooled engines. While independent of the testing office, Porsche did receive advice and funding from it for the prototypes. By the end of March 1941 the company was placing orders for major components of the prototypes.

Porsche chose to use a gasoline-electric drivetrain in his Type 100 tank to eliminate the need for a mechanical transmission, which he felt were not strong enough for such heavy vehicles. Two air-cooled V-10 Porsche Type 100 gasoline engines, mounted in the rear of the tank, were each connected to an electric generator. These drove electric motors that were connected to the front drive sprockets for the tracks. The 10 L (610 cu in) engines produced a total of 420 PS (310 kW; 410 hp).

Krupp were directly contracted by Porsche to produce the turret to house the 57-caliber 8.8 cm (3.5 in) KwK 36 gun and the two teams worked together to develop it for the VK 30.01 (P) chassis. A fully developed drawing with the Krupp turret was completed, dated 5 March 1941. The Krupp turret would be re-used on both the Porsche and the Henschel Tiger.

The requirements for the new development of a 30-tonne schwererPanzerkampfwagen included the ability to mount at least the 7.5 cm KwK L/24 main gun with a desire to fit the 10.5 cm KwK L/28 if possible. Later, in 1941, the German Army encountered —unexpectedly— heavily armored enemy vehicles such as the Soviet T-34 and KV-1. Plans were then made to instead mount the more effective 8,8 cm KwK 36 L/56.

== Bibliography ==
- Gudgin, Peter (1991). The Tiger Tanks. London: Arms and Armour Press. ISBN 0-85368-929-6.
- Jentz, Thomas L. & Doyle, Hilary L. (1997). Panzerkampfwagen VI P (Sd. Kfz. 181): The History of the Porsche Typ 100 and 101 Also Known as the Leopard and Tiger (P). Darlington, Maryland: Darlington Productions. ISBN 1-892848-03-1.
- Jentz, Thomas L. & Doyle, Hilary L. (2000). Germany's Tiger Tanks: D.W. to Tiger I. Atglen, Pennsylvania: Schiffer Publishing. ISBN 978-0-7643-1038-6.
- Spielberger, Walter J. (2007). Tigers I and II and Their Variants. Atglen, Pennsylvania: Schiffer Military History. ISBN 978-0-7643-2780-3.
