= Bombardier Transportation Austria =

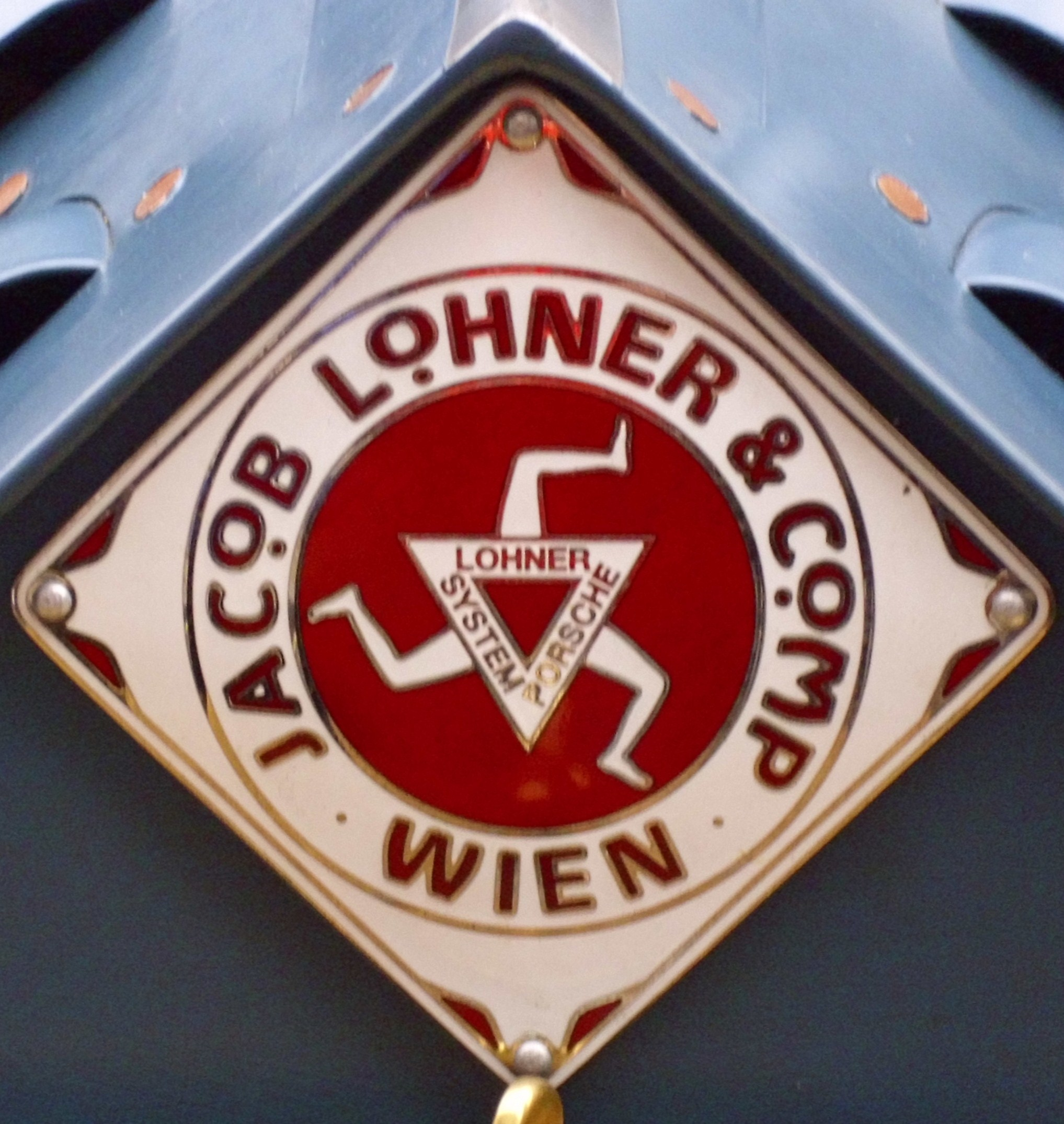
- Industry: Vehicle engineering
- Headquarters: Vienna, Austria
- Products: Aircraft, trams, other vehicles

Bombardier Transportation Austria GmbH is an Austrian subsidiary company of Bombardier Transportation located in Vienna, Austria.

It was founded in the 19th century by Jacob Lohner as Lohner-Werke or simply Lohner as a luxury coachbuilding firm. Around 1900 the firm produced electric-cars, being the first in Austria to do so; the cars were designed by Ferdinand Porsche. During the early 1900s the firm manufactured aircraft, after World War I the company manufactured trams, and after World War II the company began manufacturing scooters and mopeds using engines from Rotax, with which it merged in 1959, forming Lohner Rotax. In 1970 Canadian firm Bombardier Transportation acquired a controlling share in the company and renamed it Bombardier-Rotax GmbH. Under Bombardier the company became Bombardier Wien Schienenfahrzeuge (BWS), later Bombardier Transportation Austria GmbH. It relocated to a specialised factory in 2007, and now produces only trams.

== History ==
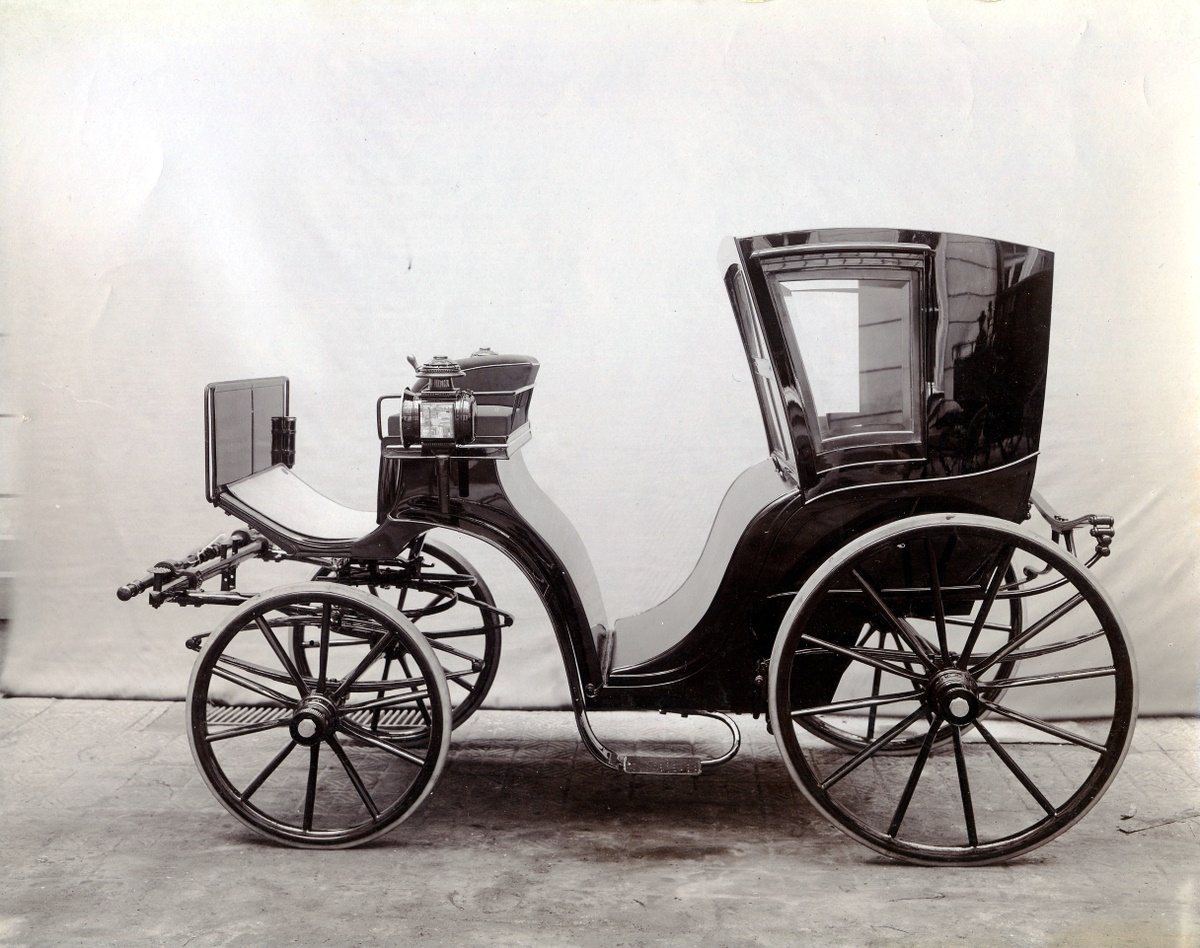
Lohner luxury carriage Lohner ~ 1910

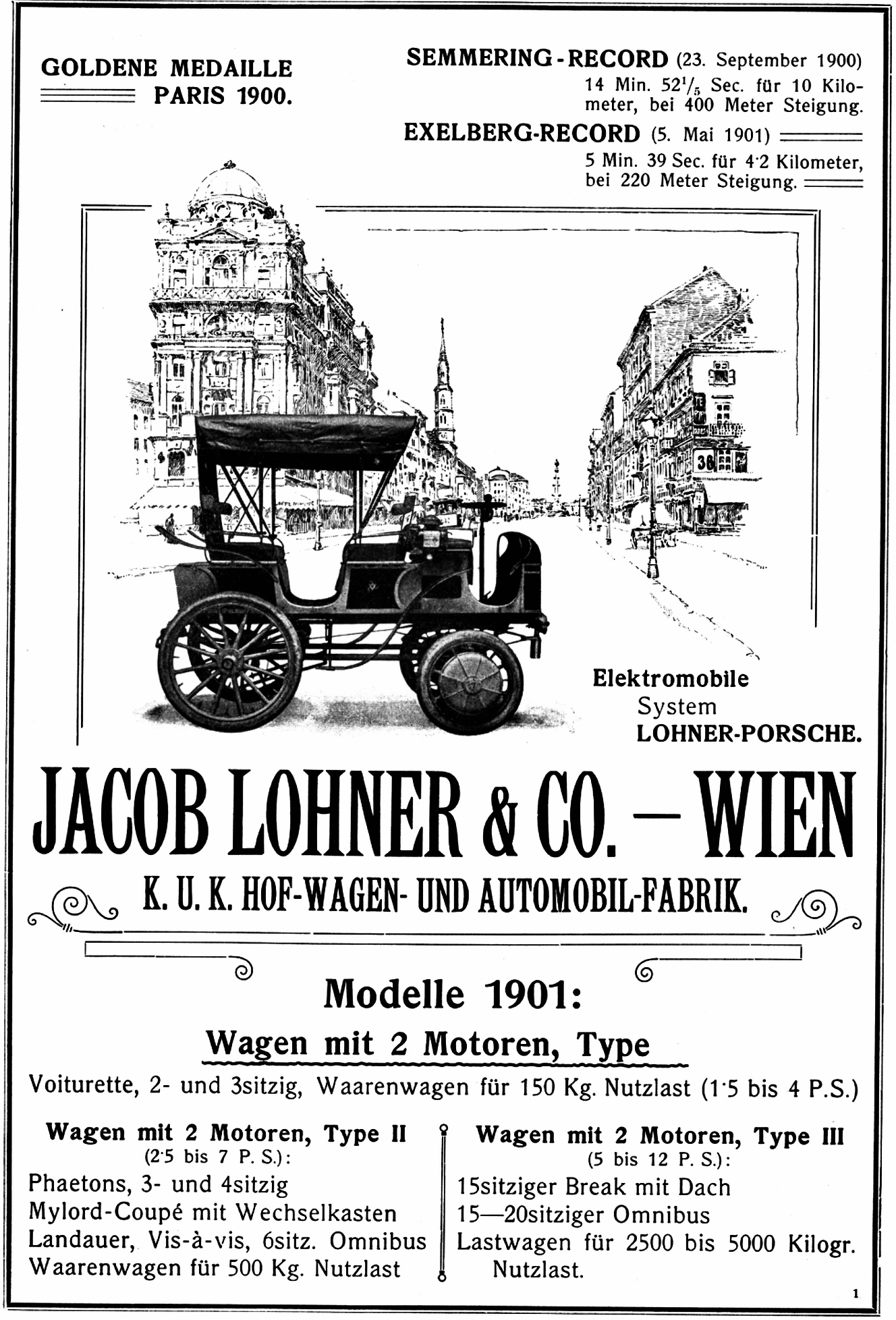
Jacob Lohner & Co. advertisement (1901)

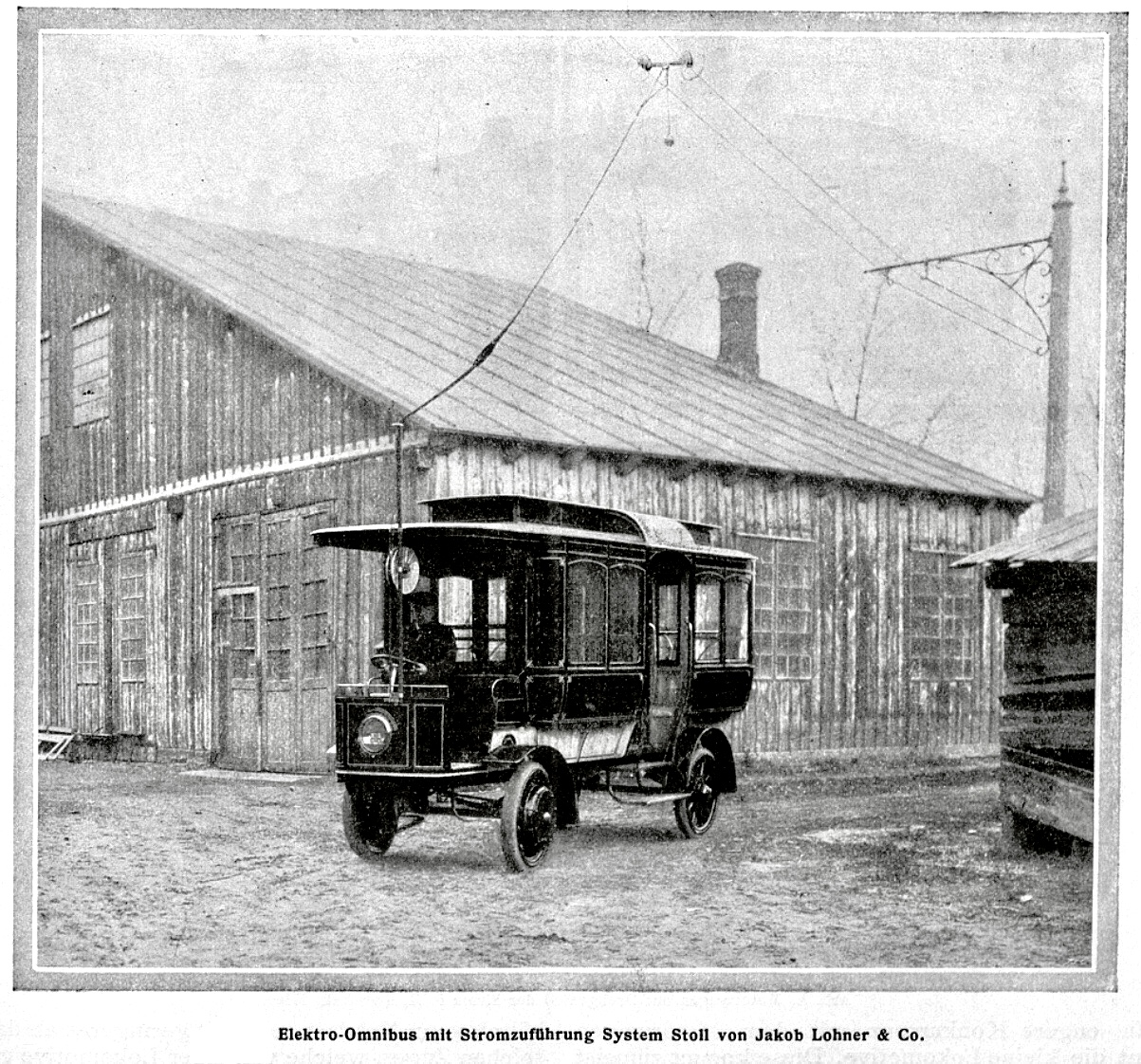
Jacob Lohner & Co. Omnibus (1906)

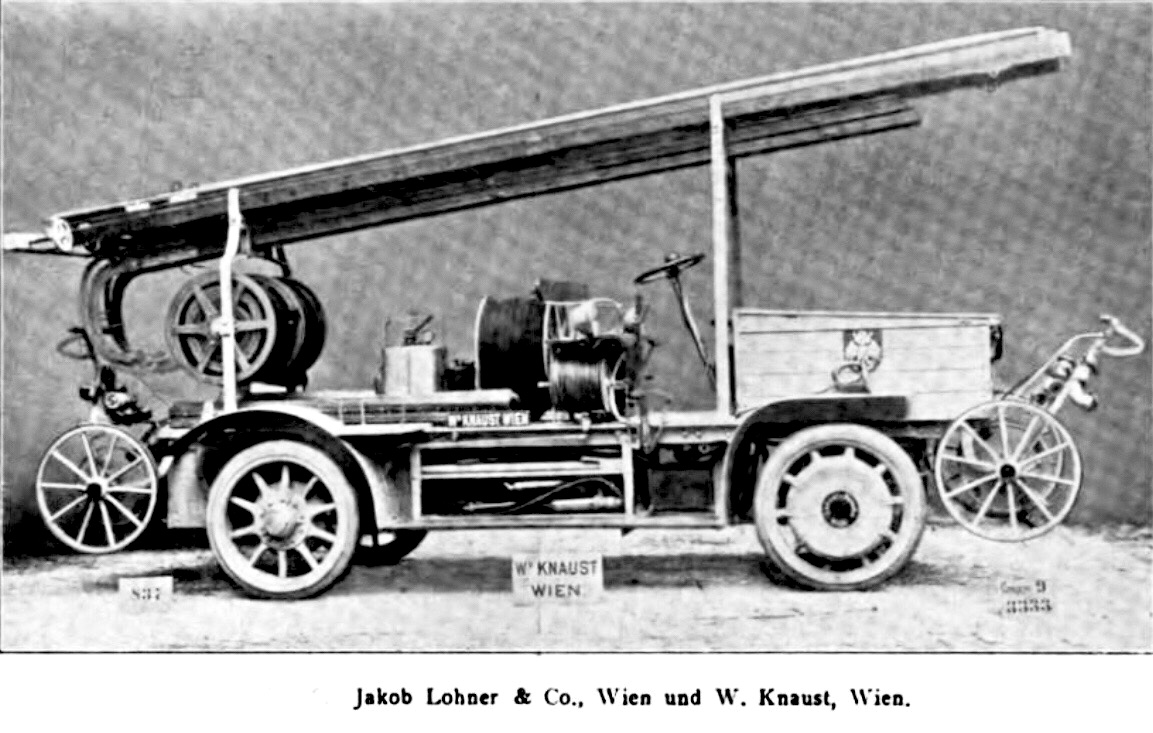
Lohner fire ladder truck (1908)

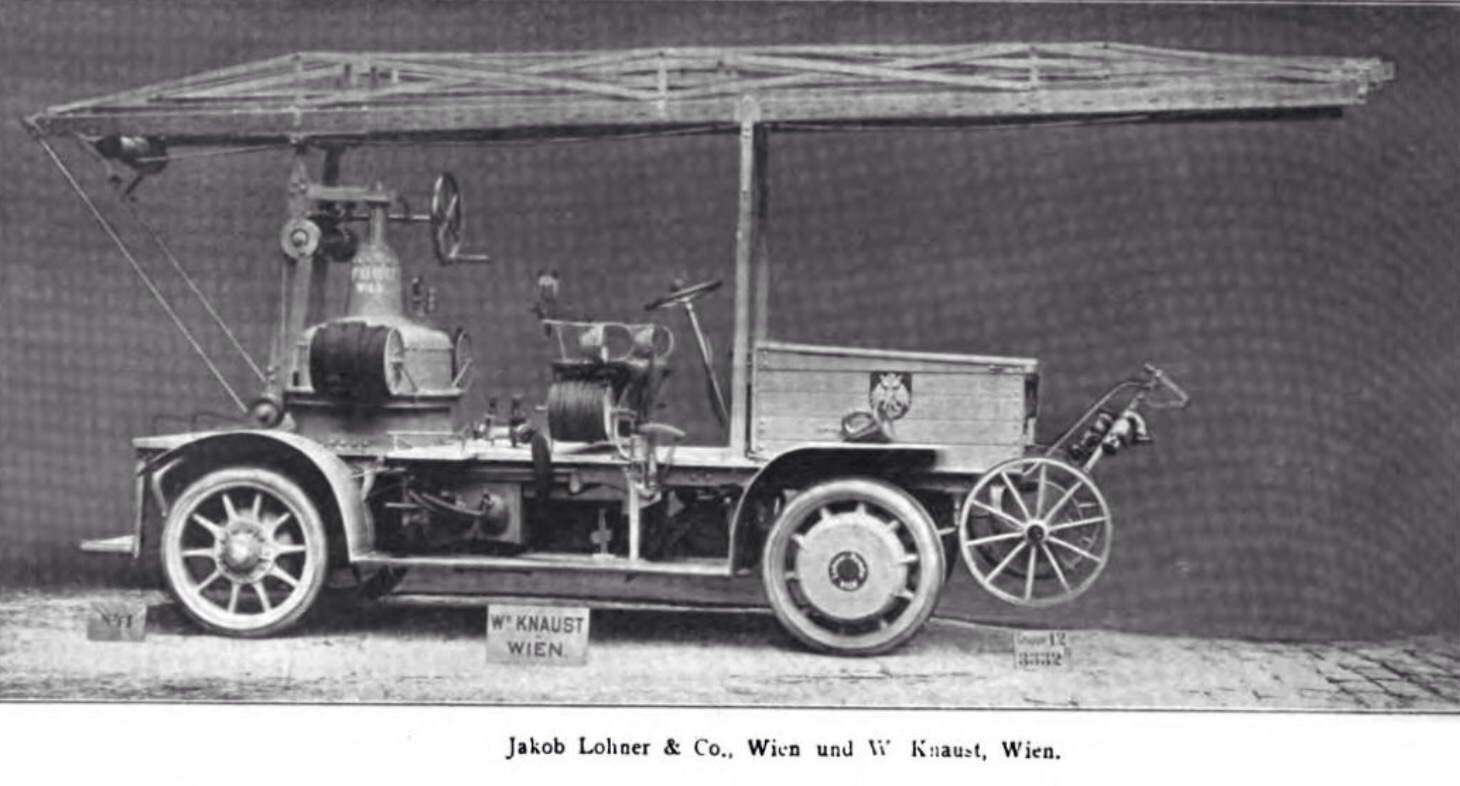
Lohner fire ladder truck with Knaust equipment (1908)

In 1821 German Heinrich Lohner (1786–1855) established a workshop in Vienna, Austria, establishing himself as a wagonmaster. In 1823 he formed a joint venture with master saddlemaker (Sattlermeister) Ludwig Laurenzi, Laurenzi & Lohner. After the death of Ludwig Laurenzi in 1863 the company became Jacob Lohner & Co. under Heinrich Lohner's son Jacob Lohner (1821–92). Jacob Lohner transformed his father's craft business into a factory eventually manufacturing between 300 and 500 vehicles per year. The company supplied vehicles to the courts of the royal houses of Norway, Sweden, and Romania, as well as to the Austrian emperor; the company received the distinction k.u.k. Hofwagenlieferant ("Royal carriagemakers").

In 1887 Jacob Lohner's son Ludwig Lohner (1858–1925) took over the company. He decided that self-powered cars were the future, initially working with Béla Egger, and in 1898 hiring Ferdinand Porsche (from Béla Egger's electricity company). During his employment Porsche designed a number of vehicles. The Lohner Porsche chaise was powered by batteries, with two front wheel electric motors mounted in the wheel hubs. One of his electric vehicles was a popular exhibit at the Exposition Universelle (Paris world fair, 1900). Porsche later developed petrol-engined cars with electric transmissions, some versions of which had additional batteries. Vehicles using the petrol electric transmission with hub motors were sold to the German army and to the Viennese fire brigade. Porsche left the Lohner company in 1905, and joined Daimler affiliate company Österreichische Daimler Motoren Commanditgesellschaft Bierenz Fischer & Co.; vehicles were later built using the Lohner Porsche system under the Mercedes brand of Daimler.

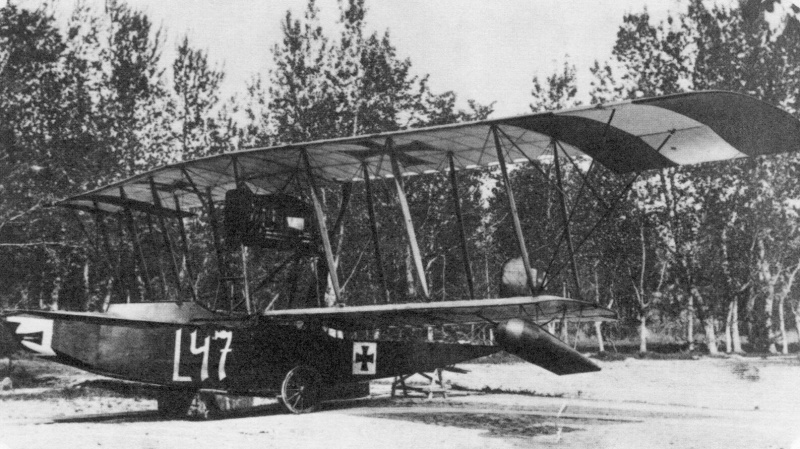
Lohner L aircraft

In 1909, the firm undertook aircraft manufacture, producing reconnaissance aircraft for the Austro-Hungarian army during the First World War, and a series of flying-boat patrol aircraft for the Navy, which were later copied by the Italian Macchi aviation firm for the Italian military in World War I. Lohner also produced aircraft for the budding Spanish Air Force.

After World War I the company abandoned aircraft production, (Note: The Treaty of Saint-Germain-en-Laye (1919) restricted Austria from having a military airforce, and restricted the number of armament factories to one.) and shifted its production to the manufacturing of trams, and coachbodies. During the Great Depression the factory in Floridsdorf shut down.

During the Anschluss with Germany, Lohner produced aircraft wings. The plant was damaged in 1944, and post World War II the company was in public administration until 1949 when it was returned to the control of the Lohner family.

In 1949 Lohner began manufacturing scooters and mopeds which were designed by Otto Kauba, a production range that would include the well-known of which was the Lohner L125. The scooter range included popular models such as the Sissy, L125 and L98, but sales were eventually reduced due to the popularity of the motorcar. Tram production also resumed post World War II.

In 1959, the Lohner factory merged with Rotax which had supplied engines for its motorscooters. During the 1960s contracts included hay-loaders, gun carriages for the Austrian Army, and Bombardier Ski-Doos which were produced under license from 1966 to 1970.

In 1970 the company was acquired by Bombardier purchased a majority of shares in the company and renamed it Bombardier-Rotax GmbH.

=== Bombardier Transportation ===
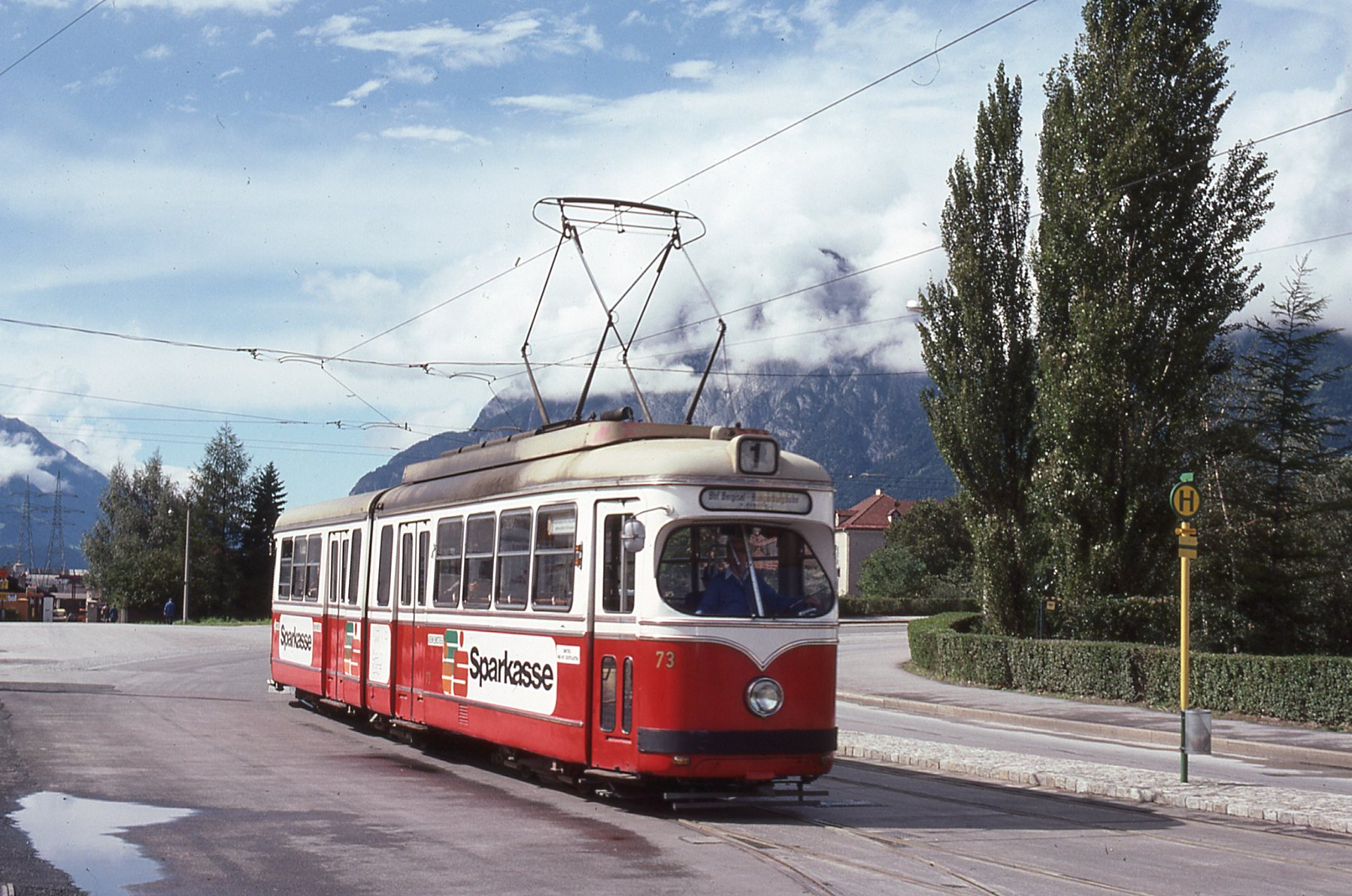
DUEWAG licensed articulated tram (1977) for Innsbruck

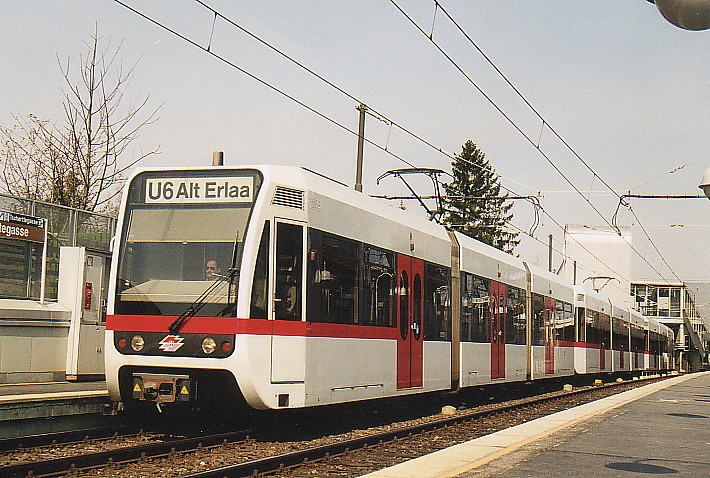
Type T light-rail unit of Line U6, Vienna U-Bahn (1995)

Reorganized later as a division of Bombardier-Rotax named Bombardier Wien Schienenfahrzeuge (BWS). After Bombardier's acquisition of Adtranz in 2001, the company's production plan designated the Vienna works for carbody production, specialising in Light rail vehicles (LRV).

The company moved to a new plant in the Donaustadt district of Vienna in 2007. (Note: 48.26548°N 16.47136°E, Hermann Gebauer Straße 5, A-1220 Vienna, Austria) As of 2012 the company operates as Bombardier Transportation Austria GmbH & Co. KG, and manufactures trams.

== Aircraft ==
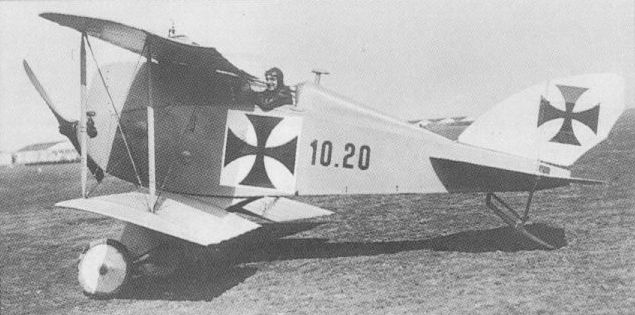
The Lohner 10.20A with lengthened fuselage, twin struts and vertical fin.

- (1914)
- Lohner Type AA
- Lohner B.I
- Lohner B.II
- Lohner B.VII
- Lohner E
- Lohner L
