= Porsche 005 =

Turbojet engine

- Type: Turbojet
- National origin: Germany
- Designer: Porsche KG
- Major applications: V-1 flying bomb (planned)
- Status: Unbuilt design

The Porsche 005 (full RLM designation 109-005) was a small, single-use turbojet design intended to power a long-range version of the V-1 flying bomb. At the end of World War II, the design of the Porsche 005 turbojet had not been finalised and no parts had been constructed.

== Design and development ==
The Argus As 014 pulsejet used in production V-1 flying bombs was simple to build but relatively fuel inefficient. Design of the Porsche 005 began in late 1944 with the aim of providing a more fuel efficient engine for the V-1 allowing for greater ranges. The use of the Porsche 005 turbojet was projected to increase the range of the V-1 from 240 km (149 mi) to 700 km (435 mi) and allow launching without ramps.

During the last months of World War II the Porsche 005 project was being led by Dr Max Adolf Mueller, who had worked on jet engine projects for both Junkers and Heinkel. Dr Mueller was taken into captivity at the end of the war, and later prepared a drawing of the Porsche 005 for American investigators. Post-war, Porsche did not continue work on gas turbines or jet engines.

== Specifications ==
Note that only limited progress on the Porsche 005 design had been made by the end of World War II. Known engine data and targeted performance is shown:

==== General characteristics ====
- Type: Turbojet
- Length: 2,850 mm (112 in)
- Diameter: 650 mm (25.6 in)
- Dry weight: 200 kg (440 lb) for complete power unit

==== Components ====
- Compressor: Axial flow

==== Performance ====
- Maximum thrust: 500 kg (1,100 lb) static
- Overall pressure ratio: 2.8:1
- Thrust-to-weight ratio: 2.5
