= VK 45.01 (P) =

German heavy tank prototype

- Type: Prototype heavy tank
- Place of origin: Nazi Germany

Production history
- Manufacturer: Porsche
- No. built: 10 + 90 hulls, hulls converted to Ferdinand tank destroyers, 1 Tiger (P) served as command vehicle

Specifications
- Mass: 60 t (59 long tons; 66 short tons)
- Length: 9.54 m (31 ft 4 in)
- Width: 3.40 m (11 ft 2 in)
- Height: 2.90 m (9 ft 6 in)
- Crew: 5
- Armor: 20–100 mm (0.79–3.94 in)
- Main armament: 8.8 cm KwK 36 L/56
- Secondary armament: 2 x 7.92 mm MG 34
- Engine: 2 x 10 cylinder Porsche Type 101; 310 PS (306 hp, 288 kW) each
- Suspension: Longitudinal torsion-bar
- Operational range: 105 km (65 mi) road
- Maximum speed: 35 km/h (22 mph)

The VK 45.01 (P), also informally known as Tiger (P) or Porsche Tiger, was a heavy tank prototype designed by Porsche in Germany. With a dual engine gasoline-electric drive that was complex and requiring significant amounts of copper, it lost out to its Henschel competitor on trials, it was not selected for mass production and the Henschel design was produced as the Tiger I. Most of the already produced chassis were rebuilt as Elefant Panzerjäger tank destroyers.

== Development ==
On 26 May 1941, Henschel and Porsche were asked to submit designs for a 45-ton heavy tank capable of mounting the high velocity 8.8 cm Kwk 36 L/56 gun which was derived from the German 88 mm Flak 37 antiaircraft gun. Both the Henschel and Porsche tanks were to be fitted with the same turret supplied by Krupp. The Porsche company worked on updating the VK 30.01 (P) medium tank, Porsche's medium tank prototype, and adapted parts used on it for the new tank.

The new Porsche tank, designated the VK 45.01 (P) was to be powered by twin V-10 air cooled Porsche Type 101 gasoline engines which were mounted to the rear of the tank. Each of the twin engines would then drive a separate generator, one for either side of the tank, which would then power each of two electric motors, one powering each track from the rear drive sprocket. But the engines and drive train were generally new and unorthodox designs for a tank (other than some brief experiments in the very early years), and due to being underdeveloped were prone to break down or require frequent maintenance. It was also difficult for the Third Reich to obtain additional amounts of quality copper to build whole new fleets of vehicles with electric drives in addition to the increasing demands of the U-boat fleet (which used very similar diesel-electric transmissions, which worked perfectly well); while it was easy enough to obtain quality copper to build a single prototype, once series production began, this became more difficult. These problems, and the fact that trials proved the tank to be less maneuverable than its competitor, were the reason why Henschel's identically armed and more conventional VK 45.01 (H) H1 prototype, which became the Tiger I, was adopted for production instead.

The VK 45.01 (P) chassis was later chosen to be the basis of a new heavy Jagdpanzer (although designated a Panzerjäger) which would eventually be called the Ferdinand and mount the new, longer, 88 mm Pak 43/2.

Only one tank went into service as a command tank in the Ferdinand (Elefant) unit, and served in Panzerjäger Abteilung 653. It was deployed in April 1944 and lost that subsequent July.

The VK 45.01 (P)'s chassis and many of the Elefant's components were later used in developing the VK 45.02 (P) prototype heavy tank.

== Design ==
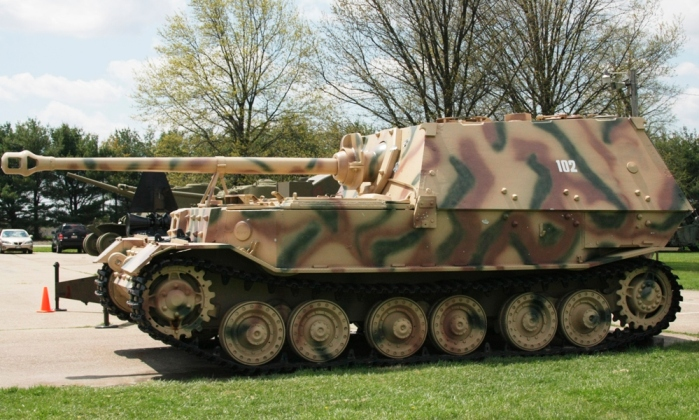
Elefant, showing the suspension it shared with the VK 45.01 (P) chassis

Ferdinand Porsche developed the spring rod roller carriage; there were 6 road wheels, each road wheel formed of an inner and outer paired wheel per axle. The six paired road wheels were divided into three 2-axle bogies per side, for a total of 12 individual wheels, 6 road wheels/axles, in 3 bogies. The wheels were not 'interleaved' like those of the Tiger I. The 57 to 59 tons combat weight in combination with 640 mm wide "slack-tracks" (KGS 62/640/130) using no return rollers, produced a ground pressure of about 1.06 kg / cm^{2}.

The gasoline-electric drive specially developed by Ferdinand Porsche entered "uncharted territory" for road vehicles; this led to numerous development issues with the drive system. The two air-cooled 15-litre V-10 engines designated Porsche Type 101, which were each coupled with a Siemens-Schuckert 500 kVA generator, generated the necessary electric power to operate each of the two Siemens 230 kW (312.7 PS) individual-output electric motors driving the rear sprockets. In this drive system, a mechanical power transmission system and gearbox could be omitted, since now a 3-step speed switch took over the work. The electric motors transferred their power to a final drive with a ratio of 15: 1 directly to the drive wheels located at the rear. The fuel tanks carried 520 litres of petrol and allowed a driving range of 105 kilometers. Two compressed air tanks in the front crew compartment area assisted the driver during braking maneuvers.

Unlike the Henschel design's mid-hull mounting for the turret, the VK 45.01 (P) had its Krupp-designed turret mounted at the front. The turret, which mounted the 8.8 cm KwK 36 and a 7.92 mm MG 34 coaxial machine gun, was essentially the same Krupp design also used for Henschel's contract-winning VK45.01 (H) prototype design. The first eight turrets produced had lower sides and a flat roof with raised centre section to allow the gun to be depressed through a larger arc.

== Variants ==
- VK 45.01 (P) Test prototype

VK45.01 chassis fitted with a concrete turret mockup to simulate the weight of the Krupp turret for testing purposes. Only 100 chassis were built.

- VK 45.01 (P) (Porsche Tiger)

10 VK45.01 tanks with the Krupp turrets and 8.8 cm KwK 36 guns were produced. Only one completed Tiger (P) with chassis number 150013 saw combat service as a command tank.

- Panzerjäger Tiger (P) "Ferdinand"

91 existing VK 4501 chassis were converted into Ferdinand jagdpanzers. The work was completed in just a few months from March to May 1943.

- Panzerjäger Tiger (P) "Elefant"

In September 1943 all surviving Ferdinands were recalled to be modified. 48 of the 50 surviving vehicles were modified with additional armour, a new commanders cupola (from StuG III) and a new ball mounted frontal machine gun for self defense.

- Bergepanzer Tiger (P)

A conversion of the VK 45.01 (P) chassis into recovery vehicles designated Bergepanzer Tiger (P). Only 3 were built.

- VK 45.01 "RammTiger"

A proposed conversion of the VK 45.01 (P) chassis in a heavily armoured ramming vehicle armed with machine guns. 3 superstructures were completed but their fate is unknown as the project was cancelled in 1943.

== Bibliography ==
- Jentz, Thomas; Doyle, Hilary (1997). Panzerkampfwagen VI (P) (Sd. Kfz. 181) The History of the Porsche Type 100 and 101 also known as the Leopard and Tiger (P). Darlington: Darlington Productions. ISBN 978-1-8928-4803-1.
- Jentz, Thomas L. & Doyle, Hilary L. (2000). Germany's Tiger Tanks: D.W. to Tiger I. Atglen, Pennsylvania: Schiffer Publishing. ISBN 978-0-7643-1038-6.
- Spielberger, Walter J. (2007). Tigers I and II and Their Variants. Atglen, Pennsylvania: Schiffer Military History. ISBN 978-0-76432-780-3.
