= Béla Egger =

Austrian scientist

- Born: May 18, 1831; Budapest
- Died: July 5, 1910 (aged 79); Vienna, Austria
- Occupation: Engineer

Béla Egger (1831–1910) was an Austrian scientist and inventor who contributed to the development of the automobile.

== Biography ==
Egger was born on 18 May 1831 in Budapest, Austrian Empire. He died on 5 July 1910 in Vienna, Austria.

== Career ==
In Budapest he founded a factory for the production of low and high current devices and another for incandescent lamps.

He founded the United Incandescent Lamp and Electricity Company.
