= List of Knight's Cross of the Iron Cross recipients (O) =

The Knight's Cross of the Iron Cross (German: Ritterkreuz des Eisernen Kreuzes) and its variants were the highest awards in the military and paramilitary forces of Nazi Germany during World War II. The Knight's Cross of the Iron Cross was awarded for a wide range of reasons and across all ranks, from a senior commander for skilled leadership of his troops in battle to a low-ranking soldier for a single act of extreme gallantry. A total of 7,321 awards were made between its first presentation on 30 September 1939 and its last bestowal on 17 June 1945. (Note: Großadmiral and President of Germany Karl Dönitz, Hitler's successor as Head of State (Staatsoberhaupt) and Supreme Commander of the Armed Forces, had ordered the cessation of all promotions and awards as of 11 May 1945 (Dönitz-decree). Consequently the last Knight's Cross awarded to Oberleutnant zur See of the Reserves Georg-Wolfgang Feller on 17 June 1945 must therefore be considered a de facto but not de jure hand-out.) This number is based on the analysis and acceptance of the order commission of the Association of Knight's Cross Recipients (AKCR). Presentations were made to members of the three military branches of the Wehrmacht—the Heer (Army), Kriegsmarine (Navy) and Luftwaffe (Air Force)—as well as the Waffen-SS, the Reichsarbeitsdienst (RAD—Reich Labour Service) and the Volkssturm (German national militia). There were also 43 recipients in the military forces of allies of the Third Reich.

These recipients are listed in the 1986 edition of Walther-Peer Fellgiebel's book, Die Träger des Ritterkreuzes des Eisernen Kreuzes 1939–1945 — The Bearers of the Knight's Cross of the Iron Cross 1939–1945. Fellgiebel was the former chairman and head of the order commission of the AKCR. In 1996, the second edition of this book was published with an addendum delisting 11 of these original recipients. Author Veit Scherzer has cast doubt on a further 193 of these listings. The majority of the disputed recipients had received the award in 1945, when the deteriorating situation of Germany in the final days of World War II in Europe left a number of nominations incomplete and pending in various stages of the approval process.

Listed here are the 82 Knight's Cross recipients whose last name starts with "O". Scherzer has challenged the validity of two of these listings. The recipients are ordered alphabetically by last name. The rank listed is the recipient's rank at the time the Knight's Cross was awarded.

== Background ==
The Knight's Cross of the Iron Cross and its higher grades were based on four separate enactments. The first enactment, Reichsgesetzblatt I S. 1573 of 1 September 1939 instituted the Iron Cross (Eisernes Kreuz), the Knight's Cross of the Iron Cross and the Grand Cross of the Iron Cross (Großkreuz des Eisernen Kreuzes). Article 2 of the enactment mandated that the award of a higher class be preceded by the award of all preceding classes. As the war progressed, some of the recipients of the Knight's Cross distinguished themselves further and a higher grade, the Knight's Cross of the Iron Cross with Oak Leaves (Ritterkreuz des Eisernen Kreuzes mit Eichenlaub), was instituted. The Oak Leaves, as they were commonly referred to, were based on the enactment Reichsgesetzblatt I S. 849 of 3 June 1940. In 1941, two higher grades of the Knight's Cross were instituted. The enactment Reichsgesetzblatt I S. 613 of 28 September 1941 introduced the Knight's Cross of the Iron Cross with Oak Leaves and Swords (Ritterkreuz des Eisernen Kreuzes mit Eichenlaub und Schwertern) and the Knight's Cross of the Iron Cross with Oak Leaves, Swords and Diamonds (Ritterkreuz des Eisernen Kreuzes mit Eichenlaub, Schwertern und Brillanten). At the end of 1944 the final grade, the Knight's Cross of the Iron Cross with Golden Oak Leaves, Swords, and Diamonds (Ritterkreuz des Eisernen Kreuzes mit goldenem Eichenlaub, Schwertern und Brillanten), based on the enactment Reichsgesetzblatt 1945 I S. 11 of 29 December 1944, became the final variant of the Knight's Cross authorized.

== Recipients ==
The Oberkommando der Wehrmacht (Supreme Command of the Armed Forces) kept separate Knight's Cross lists for the Heer (Army), Kriegsmarine (Navy), Luftwaffe (Air Force) and Waffen-SS. Within each of these lists a unique sequential number was assigned to each recipient. The same numbering paradigm was applied to the higher grades of the Knight's Cross, one list per grade. Of the 82 awards made to servicemen whose last name starts with "O", seven were later awarded the Knight's Cross of the Iron Cross with Oak Leaves and four the Knight's Cross of the Iron Cross with Oak Leaves and Swords; seven presentations were made posthumously. Heer members received 52 of the medals, six went to the Kriegsmarine, 21 to the Luftwaffe, and three to the Waffen-SS. The sequential numbers greater than 843 for the Knight's Cross of the Iron Cross with Oak Leaves are unofficial and were assigned by the Association of Knight's Cross Recipients (AKCR) and are therefore denoted in parentheses.

This along with the + (plus) indicates that a higher grade of Knight's Cross was awarded as well.
This along with the * (asterisk) indicates that the Knight's Cross was awarded posthumously.
This along with the ? (question mark) indicates that author Veit Scherzer has expressed doubt regarding the veracity and formal correctness of the listing.

Name	Service	Rank	Role and unit (Note: For an explanation of the various naming schemes used by the Luftwaffe, Heer, Kriegsmarine and Waffen-SS refer to nomenclature used by the Wehrmacht and Waffen-SS.)	Date of award	Notes	Image
Eduard Obergethmann	Luftwaffe	Oberstleutnant	Commander of Flak-Regiment 99 (motorized) (Note: According to Scherzer as commander of Flak-Regiment 99.)	24 January 1943	—	—
Hans Oberhofer	Heer	Hauptmann	Company chief in the II./Jäger-Regiment 25 (L)	23 March 1945*	Died of wounds 20 February 1945	—
Karl Oberkircher	Heer	Oberjäger	Group leader in the 6./Gebirgsjäger-Regiment 218	12 October 1943	—	—
Werner Oberländer	Luftwaffe	Oberleutnant	Pilot in the 2./Kampfgeschwader 55	24 March 1943	—	—
Walther Oberloskamp	Heer	Leutnant of the Reserves	Zugführer (platoon leader) in the 3./Sturmgeschütz-Abteilung 667	10 May 1943	—	—
Dr. jur. Fritz Graf von Oberndorff	Heer	Major of the Reserves	Commander of Aufklärungs-Abteilung 34	25 August 1941	—	—
Herbert Oberweg	Luftwaffe	Oberfähnrich	Observer in the 11.(H)/Aufklärungs-Gruppe 13 (Note: According to Scherzer as observer in the Nahaufklärungsstaffel 11.(H)/13.)	8 August 1944	—	—
Erich Oberwöhrmann	Heer	Hauptmann	Leader of Panzer-Abteilung "Feldherrnhalle"	7 February 1944	—	—
Friedrich Obleser	Luftwaffe	Leutnant	Staffelführer of the 8./Jagdgeschwader 52	23 March 1944 (Note: According to Scherzer on 26 March 1944.)	—	—
Alois Obschil	Waffen-SS	SS-Obersturmführer (Note: According to Scherzer as SS-Untersturmführer.)	Leader of the 2./Grenadier-Regiment 1126	28 March 1945	—	—
Walter Obst	Heer	Leutnant	Leader of the 4./Panzergrenadier-Regiment 66	30 November 1943*	Died of wounds 10 October 1943	—
Hans von Obstfelder+	Heer	General der Infanterie	Commanding general of the XXIX. Armeekorps	27 July 1941	Awarded 251st Oak Leaves 7 June 1943; 110th Swords 5 November 1944	
Wolfgang von Obstfelder+	Heer	Hauptmann	Commander of schwere Panzer-Jäger-Abteilung 346 (Note: According to Scherzer as commander of Panzer-Jäger-Abteilung 346.)	10 September 1944	Awarded (858th) Oak Leaves 30 April 1945	—
Heinrich Ochs+	Heer	Oberfeldwebel	Zugführer (platoon leader) in the 1./Panzer-Jäger-Abteilung 101	2 June 1943	Awarded 360th Oak Leaves 30 December 1943	—
Willifrank Ochsner (Note: According to Scherzer his name is spelled Wilhelm-Francis Ochsner.)	Heer	Oberst	Commander of the 31. Infanterie-Division	18 January 1944	—	—
Heinrich Ochßner	Heer	Major	Commander of Divisions-Füsilier-Bataillon 132	19 August 1944	—	—
Job Odebrecht	Luftwaffe	General der Flakartillerie	Commanding general of the II. Flakkorps (motorized) (Note: According to Scherzer as commanding general of II. Flakkorps.)	5 September 1944	—	
Wilhelm Odenhardt	Luftwaffe	Oberfeldwebel	Observer in the 4./Kampfgeschwader 4 "General Wever"	29 October 1944 (Note: According to Scherzer on 24 October 1944.)	—	—
Erich Oeckel	Heer	Oberleutnant	Chief of the 5./Schützen-Regiment 4	24 June 1940	—	—
Heinz Oehl	Heer	Leutnant	Leader of the 1./Grenadier-Regiment 62	25 July 1943*	Killed in action 5 July 1943	—
Dr. Hermann Oehmichen	Heer	Oberstleutnant	Leader of Kampfgruppe "Oehmichen" (Note: According to Scherzer in the Stab of General der Schnellen Truppe (general of rapid troops) in the OKH for his employment as commander of Panzer-Jäger-Abteilung 187 in the winter of 1941.)	27 December 1942	—	—
Victor Oehrn	Kriegsmarine	Kapitänleutnant	Commander of U-37	21 October 1940	—	—
Johann-Peter Oekenpöhler	Luftwaffe	Oberfeldwebel	Pilot in the 8./Kampfgeschwader 27 "Boelcke"	2 June 1943	—	—
Heinrich Oelker	Heer	Hauptmann	Leader of Divisions-Füsilier-Bataillon 21 (L)	26 March 1944	—	—
Karl Oepke	Heer	Hauptmann	Chief of the 6./Artillerie-Regiment 12	16 April 1944	—	—
Walter Oesau+	Luftwaffe	Hauptmann	Staffelkapitän of the 7./Jagdgeschwader 51	20 August 1940	Awarded 9th Oak Leaves 6 February 1941; 3rd Swords 15 July 1941 (Note: According to Scherzer the 3rd Knight's Cross of the Iron Cross with Oak Leaves and Swords was awarded on 16 July 1941.)	—
Jürgen Oesten	Kriegsmarine	Kapitänleutnant	Commander of U-106	26 March 1941	—	—
Albert Oesterlin	Kriegsmarine	Kapitänleutnant of the Reserves	Chief of the Küstenschutzflottille "Attika" (Note: According to Scherzer as group leader in the Küstenschutzflottille "Attika".)	9 June 1944*	Killed in aerial bombardment 22 January 1944	—
Karl Österreicher	Heer	Gefreiter	Machine gunner in the 11./Grenadier-Regiment 186	18 December 1942	—	—
Karl-Heinz Oesterwitz+	Heer	Oberleutnant	Chief of the 7./Bau-Lehr-Regiment z.b.V. 800 "Brandenburg"	30 April 1943	Awarded 734th Oak Leaves 10 February 1945	—
Heinrich Ofenloch	Heer	Unteroffizier (Note: According to Scherzer as Gefreiter.)	Group leader in the 1./Pionier-Bataillon 323	12 July 1943	—	—
Karl Offschany	Heer	Feldwebel	Zugführer (platoon leader) in the 9./Infanterie-Regiment 191	7 March 1941	—	—
Walter Ohlrogge	Luftwaffe	Feldwebel	Pilot in the 5./Jagdgeschwader 3	4 November 1941	—	—
Walter Ohmsen	Kriegsmarine	Oberleutnant (M.A.)	Chief of the Marinebatterie "Marcouf" (Marine-Artillerie-Abteilung 260) (Note: According to Scherzer as chief of sea-target battery Marinebatterie "Marcouf" (Marine-Artillerie-Abteilung 260).)	14 June 1944	—	
Horst Ohrloff	Heer	Oberleutnant	Chief of the 11./Panzer-Regiment 25	27 July 1941	—	—
Wilhelm Okrent	Heer	Obergefreiter	Richtkanonier (gunner) in the 4./Panzer-Artillerie-Regiment 116	2 April 1943	—	—
Erich Olboeter	Waffen-SS	SS-Sturmbannführer	Commander of the III.(gepanzert)/Panzergrenadier-Regiment 26 "Hitlerjugend"	28 July 1944	—	—
Friedrich Olbricht? (Note: Friedrich Olbricht was sentenced to death by an impromptu court-martial in conjunction with the failed 20 July plot of 1944 to kill Adolf Hitler. The execution was carried out immediately by firing squad at the Bendlerblock in Berlin. Olbricht was interred in full uniform with all orders and decorations. He was dishonorably discharged from the Heer with the loss of all honors and military decorations on 4 August 1944. Heinrich Himmler ordered his earthly remains to be exhumed, burned and the ashes were dispersed.)	Heer	Generalleutnant	Commander of the 24. Infanterie-Division	27 October 1943	—	
Robert Olejnik	Luftwaffe	Oberleutnant	Staffelkapitän of the 4./Jagdgeschwader 1 (Note: According to Scherzer on 30 July 1941 as pilot in the I./Jagdgeschwader 3.)	27 July 1941	—	
Herbert Oll	Heer	Hauptmann	Commander of the I./Artillerie-Regiment 78	23 August 1941	—	—
Georg Olschewski	Kriegsmarine	Oberleutnant (Ing.)	Chief engineer on U-66	23 April 1944	—	—
Emil Omert	Luftwaffe	Leutnant	Pilot in the III./Jagdgeschwader 77 (Note: According to Scherzer as pilot in the 8./Jagdgeschwader 77.)	19 March 1942	—	—
Leon von Ondarza	Heer	Oberst	Commander of Panzer-Artillerie-Regiment 2	2 September 1944	—	—
Hermann Opdenhoff	Kriegsmarine	Oberleutnant zur See	Commander Schnellboot S-31 in the 2. Schnellbootflottille (Note: According to Scherzer as commander of S-31.)	16 May 1940	—	—
Heinz-Eberhard Opitz	Heer	Oberstleutnant	Commander of Grenadier-Regiment 911	11 March 1945	—	—
Hermann von Oppeln-Bronikowski+	Heer	Oberst	Commander of Panzer-Regiment 204	1 January 1943	Awarded 536th Oak Leaves 28 July 1944; 142nd Swords 17 April 1945	
Kurt Oppenländer	Heer	Generalmajor	Commander of the 305. Infanterie-Division	25 July 1942	—	—
Walter Oppermann	Heer	Feldwebel	Zugführer (platoon leader) in the 7./Jäger-Regiment 38	5 May 1943*	Died of wounds 20 March 1943	—
Egon Orinschnig	Heer	Oberleutnant	Chief of the 10./Infanterie-Regiment 266	13 June 1941	—	—
Ralph Graf von Oriola	Heer	Generalleutnant	Commander of the 299. Infanterie-Division	23 December 1943	—	—
Helmuth Orlowski	Luftwaffe	Major	Gruppenkommandeur of the Fernaufklärungs-Gruppe 122	19 September 1943	—	—
Heinrich Orth	Luftwaffe	Oberfeldwebel	Zugführer (platoon leader) in the 4./Fallschirmjäger-Sturm-Regiment (Note: According to Scherzer as Zugführer (platoon leader) in the 4./Luftlande-Sturm-Regiment 1.)	18 March 1942*	Killed in action 10 March 1942	—
Karl Orth	Heer	Grenadier	In the 13./Grenadier-Regiment 453	3 March 1944	—	—
Alfons Orthofer	Luftwaffe	Hauptmann	Gruppenkommandeur of the II./Sturzkampfgeschwader 77	23 November 1941	—	—
Karl Ortlieb	Heer	Oberstleutnant	Commander of Grenadier-Regiment 754	10 September 1944	—	—
Ernst Orzegowski	Luftwaffe	Fahnenjunker-Feldwebel	Pilot in the 7./Schlachtgeschwader 10	14 January 1945	—	—
Theodor Ossege	Heer	Oberjäger	Group leader in the 1./Jäger-Regiment 56	5 September 1944*	Killed in action 29 July 1944	—
Werner Ostendorff+	Waffen-SS	SS-Obersturmbannführer	Ia (operational officer) of SS-Division "Das Reich"	13 September 1941	Awarded (861st) Oak Leaves 6 May 1945 (Note: No evidence of the award to Werner Ostendorff can be found in the German Federal Archives. The award was unlawfully presented by SS-Oberstgruppenführer Sepp Dietrich. The date is taken from the announcement made by the 6. SS-Panzerarmee. The sequential number "861" was assigned by the Association of Knight's Cross Recipients (AKCR).)	
Dieter Oster	Luftwaffe	Oberleutnant	Chief of the 2./Flak-Regiment 8 (motorized) (Note: According to Scherzer as chief of the 2./Flak-Regiment 8.)	9 December 1942	—	—
Wilhelm Osterhold+	Heer	Major	Commander of the III./Füsilier-Regiment 27	26 March 1944	Awarded 732nd Oak Leaves 10 February 1945	—
Theodor Osterkamp	Luftwaffe	Generalmajor	Jagdfliegerführer of Luftflotte 2 (Note: According to Scherzer as Jagdfliegerführer 1 for his achievements as Geschwaderkommodore of Jagdgeschwader 51.)	22 August 1940	—	
Felix Ostermann	Heer	Hauptmann	Leader of Divisions-Bataillon 260	26 August 1943	—	—
Max-Hellmuth Ostermann+	Luftwaffe	Leutnant	Pilot in the 7./Jagdgeschwader 54	4 September 1941	Awarded 81st Oak Leaves 12 March 1942; 10th Swords 17 May 1942	—
Hans-Arno Ostermeier+	Heer	Hauptmann of the Reserves	Leader of a Kampfgruppe in the Panzergrenadier-Division "Feldherrnhalle" (Note: According to Scherzer as leader of a Kampfgruppe in the Panzergrenadier-Ersatz- and Ausbildungs-Regiment 84 (Gleiwitz) attached to the Panzergrenadier-Division "Feldherrnhalle".)	23 August 1944	Awarded 834th Oak Leaves 15 April 1945	—
Franz Oswald	Luftwaffe	Hauptmann	Staffelkapitän of the 13.(Panzer)/Schlachtgeschwader 9	24 October 1944	—	—
Oskar Otolski	Luftwaffe	Major	Gruppenkommandeur of (Fern)Aufklärungs-Gruppe 2	30 September 1944	—	—
Eugen Ott	Heer	General der Infanterie	Commanding general of the LII. Armeekorps	25 December 1942	—	—
Heinz Ott? (Note: Heinz Ott's nomination by the troop of the corps was not forwarded or was lost due to the military situation. A second nomination was made after the evacuation of East Prussia, after the unconditional surrender. This nomination was not processed. The order commission of the Association of Knight's Cross Recipients (AKCR) handled this case in 1982 and decided: "Knight's Cross yes, 9 May 1945". The presentation date was later changed by Fellgiebel.)	Heer	Oberwachtmeister	Zugführer (platoon leader) in the 12./Panzer-Regiment 24	9 May 1945	—	—
Helmuth Ott	Heer	Oberleutnant of the Reserves	Chief of the 3./Grenadier-Regiment 97	16 November 1943	—	—
Joachim Ott	Heer	Hauptmann of the Reserves	Leader of the I./Jäger-Regiment 28	28 October 1944	—	—
Rudolf Ott	Heer	Oberst	Commander of Jäger-Regiment 56	28 February 1945	—	—
Norbert Ottawa	Heer	Hauptmann of the Reserves (Note: According to Scherzer as Hauptmann.)	Chief of the 1./Füsilier-Regiment 22	7 September 1943	—	—
Albrecht Otte	Heer	Oberleutnant	Chief of the 2./Panzer-Pionier-Bataillon 32	28 April 1945	—	—
Friedrich-Wilhelm Otte	Heer	Oberst	Commander of Jäger-Regiment 207	13 November 1942	—	—
Dr. jur. Maximilian Otte+	Luftwaffe	Oberleutnant	Pilot in the 9./Sturzkampfgeschwader 2 "Immelmann"	5 April 1942	Awarded 433rd Oak Leaves 24 March 1944	—
Otto-Ernst Ottenbacher	Heer	Generalleutnant	Commander of the 36. Infanterie-Division (motorized)	13 August 1941	—	—
Ernst Otto	Heer	Hauptmann	Leader of the II./Grenadier-Regiment 454	10 February 1943	—	—
Rudolf Otto	Heer	Unteroffizier	Group leader in the 6./Grenadier-Regiment 529	15 May 1944	—	—
Werner Otto	Heer	Unteroffizier	Group leader in the 2./Grenadier-Regiment 529	6 April 1944	—	—
Karl von Oven	Heer	Generalleutnant	Commander of the 56. Infanterie-Division	9 January 1942	—	—
Theo Overhagen	Heer	Feldwebel	Zugführer (platoon leader) in the 9./Panzergrenadier-Regiment 9	1 January 1944	—	—
Gerold Overhoff	Heer	Oberleutnant	Chief of the 1./Grenadier-Regiment 11 (motorized)	10 December 1942	—	—
