= 197th Infantry Division (Wehrmacht) =

German 197th Infantry Division
- 197. Infanterie-Division
- Division insignia
- Active: 1 December 1939 – 22 July 1944
- Country: Nazi Germany
- Branch: Army
- Type: Infantry
- Role: Infantry
- Size: Division
- Engagements: World War II: Battle of France; Operation Barbarossa; Battle of Białystok–Minsk; Battle of Smolensk (1941); Battle of Moscow; Battles of Rzhev; Operation Bagration; Vitebsk–Orsha Offensive

Commanders
- Notable commanders: Ehrenfried-Oskar Böge

The 197th Infantry Division (German: 197. Infanterie-Division) was a Wehrmacht division in World War II. It was activated on 1 December 1939.

In 1941, soldiers of the division were involved in the torture and murder of Zoya Kosmodemyanskaya, a Soviet partisan, in Petrishchevo. The division was destroyed near Vitebsk during the Soviet Vitebsk–Orsha Offensive of Operation Bagration of the summer of 1944.

== Operational history ==
The division was activated on 1 December 1939 in the Posen region in Wehrkreis XXI as a division of the seventh Aufstellungswelle, using personnel from the replacement personnel of Wehrkreis XII (Wiesbaden) stationed in the Posen area at the time. The division maintained a Hessian, Palatine and Middle Rhenish regional identity. The division initially consisted of the Infantry Regiments 321 and 332 (formed from Infantry Replacement Regiment 33 and Infantry Replacement Regiment 246, respectively) as well as the Light Artillery Detachment 229. The initial divisional commander was Hermann Meyer-Rabingen.

With its two infantry regiments, the 197th Infantry Division was initially understrength, but bolstered into full divisional strength by the addition of Infantry Regiment 347, formed from Landwehr Infantry Regiment 183 (Wehrkreis VIII) and initially consisting of two battalions, on 8 January 1940. Additionally, the Light Artillery Detachment 229 became the Artillery Regiment 229 through the addition of staff elements from Artillery Regiment 708 and the third detachment of Artillery Regiment 223. In March 1940, the division was visited, along with other newly raised divisions of its type, by Erich von Manstein during an inspection tour.

During the Battle of France, the 197th Infantry Division was part of the mostly static Army Group C along the prewar Franco-German border, opposite the French fortifications at the Maginot Line. One of the more notable members of the division at this point in time was Friedrich von Mellenthin, who later went on to command the 9th Panzer Division during the final months of the war, but who was in 1940 the chief of staff ("Ia") of the 197th Infantry Division. On 12 May 1940, Infantry Regiment 347 was strengthened from two to three battalions. On 16 May 1940, Artillery Regiment 223 was bolstered to a strength of nine batteries. Only on 14 June, during the final weeks of the campaign in France, did the 197th Infantry Division advance against French positions in the Maginot Line.

On 20 October 1940, the staff of Infantry Regiment 347 as well as the battalions III./321 and III./332 were reorganized into the Infantry Regiment 682, which was transferred from the 197th Infantry Division to the newly formed 335th Infantry Division (14th Aufstellungswelle) near Langenau in Württemberg. The 197th Infantry Division received reinforcements to replace the transferred personnel.

In winter 1940/41, Artillery Regiment 223 received an additional heavy artillery detachment through the transfer of the IV./Artillery Regiment 225. The heavy artillery was in turn replaced by the addition of I./58 from the 22nd Infantry Division in winter 1941/42.

On 7 May 1941, the III./347 battalion was transferred from the 197th Infantry Division to the forces of the German Africa Corps on the North African theater, where it became the 1st battalion of the Light Infantry Regiment (Motorized) 200 of the 90th Light Afrika Division.

In June 1941, the 197th Infantry Division was sent to the Eastern Front, where it was assigned to the central sector.

On 29 November 1941, members of the 197th Infantry Division were involved in the execution of Soviet partisan Zoya Kosmodemyanskaya (and subsequently, likely in the mutilation and desecration of her corpse as well as the attempted cover-up).

On 1 April 1942, Meyer-Rabingen was replaced as divisional commander by Ehrenfried-Oskar Boege.

On 30 April 1943, the staff and third battalion of the 321st Regiment as well as the third battalion of the 332nd Regiment were dissolved as a result of casualties; the combat battalions potentially effectively stopped existing even earlier than that. The regiments were by this point called Grenadier Regiments rather than Infantry Regiments, keeping with the general redesignation of all German Infantry Regiments (besides Jäger Regiments and Gebirgsjäger Regiments) as Grenadier Regiments on 15 October 1942. The 321st Regiment was subsequently split and its battalions reattached to Grenadier Regiments 332 and 347, resulting in the 197th Infantry Division now consisting of two rather than three regiments.

On 2 November 1943, II./321 and II./347 were dissolved as a result of casualties and I./321 was redesignated II./321. Division Group 52 was added to the division. On 5 November, Eugen Wößner took command of the division from Boege; Boege subsequently became the commander of the XXXXIII Army Corps.

On 14 March 1944, Colonel Hans Hahne became the divisional commander.

The division was smashed by Soviet forces in the cauldron of Vitebsk during the Soviet Vitebsk–Orsha offensive. Its last commander, Hans Hahne, went MIA during the final days of the division; his remains were never found. The remnants of the 197th Infantry Division were merged with the remnants of the 95th and 256th Infantry Division into Corps Detachment H.

== War crimes ==
According to the testimony of a German prisoner of war, non-commissioned officer of the 10th company of the 332nd Infantry Regiment of the 197th Division, Karl Beierlein, the regiment was involved in the torture and death of Zoya Kosmodemyanskaya. Stalin ordered that the soldiers and officers of the Division, which participated in the execution, should not be taken prisoner.

== Order of battle ==
=== 1 December 1939 ===
After its formation on 1 December 1939, the 197th Infantry Division had the following order of battle:

- Infantry Regiment 321, with I./321, II./321 and III./321 battalions (formed from Infantry Replacement Regiment 33 Posen, II./321 from Infantry Replacement Regiment 34 Hohensalza, III./321 from Infantry Replacement Regiment 36 Lissa)
- Infantry Regiment 332, with I./332, II./332 and III./332 battalions (formed from Infantry Replacement Regiment 246 Pleschen, II./332 from Border Infantry Replacement Regiment 125 Warthelager, III./332 from Infantry Replacement Regiment 263 Sieradz)
- Light Artillery Detachment 229

=== 8 January 1940 ===
After the addition of reinforcements on 8 January 1940, the 197th Infantry Division had the following order of battle:

- Infantry Regiment 321, with I./321, II./321 and III./321 battalions
- Infantry Regiment 332, with I./332, II./332 and III./332 battalions
- Infantry Regiment 347, with I./347, II./347 and III./347 battalions (formed from Landwehr Infantry Regiment 347)
- Artillery Regiment 229, with I./229, II./229 and III./229 battalions (formed from the staff of Artillery Regiment 708, the Light Artillery Detachment 229 (as I./229) and III./Artillery Regiment 223 (as III./229))
- Division Units 229

=== 30 April 1943 ===
After the major reorganizations of 30 April 1943, the 197th Infantry Division had the following order of battle:

- Grenadier Regiment 332, with I./332, II./332 and II./321 battalions
- Grenadier Regiment 347, with I./347, II./347 and I./321 battalions
- Division Battalion 229
- Artillery Regiment 229, with I./229, II./229, III./229 and I./58 battalions

=== 2 November 1943 ===
After the reorganizations of 2 November 1943, the 197th Infantry Division had the following order of battle:

- Grenadier Regiment 332, with I./332 and II./332 battalions
- Grenadier Regiment 347, with I./347 and II./321 battalions
- Division Group 52, with Regiment Group 163 and Regiment Group 181
- Division Fusilier Battalion 197
- Artillery Regiment 229, with I./229, II./229, III./229 and I./58
- Division Units 229

== Legacy ==
After World War II, a Traditionsgemeinschaft (veterans' organization) of the 197th Infantry Division was formed. In 1969, the veterans' organization published a German-language divisional history in Wiesbaden. In 1989, they published another German-language piece for the 50th anniversary of the division's foundation in 1939.

== Noteworthy individuals ==
=== Commanding officers ===
- Generalleutnant Hermann Meyer-Rabingen, 1 December 1939 – 1 April 1942
- General der Infanterie Ehrenfried-Oskar Böge, 1 April 1942 – 5 November 1943
- Generalleutnant Eugen Wößner, 5 November 1943 – 14 March 1944
- Generalmajor Hans Hahne, 14 March 1944 – 24 June 1944, KIA

=== Others ===
- Friedrich von Mellenthin, chief of staff (Ia) of the 197th Infantry Division during the Battle of France.
