= Hans Hahne (general) =

Nazi officer (1894–1944)

- Born: 30 November 1894; Berlin, Province of Brandenburg, Kingdom of Prussia, German Empire
- Died: 27 June 1944 (aged 49); MIA near Vitebsk, Eastern Front, USSR
- Relatives: ∞ 1926 Gerda Burchardt; 2 children
- Military career
- Allegiance: German Empire; Weimar Republic; Nazi Germany
- Branch: Prussian Army; Imperial German Army; Reichsheer; German Army
- Service years: 1914–1944
- Rank: Generalmajor (Posthumously)
- Unit: Kaiser Franz Garde-Grenadier-Regiment Nr. 2
- Commands: 197th Infantry Division
- Conflicts: World War I: World War II; Battle of France; Operation Barbarossa; Battle of Smolensk (1941); Battle of Moscow; Operation Bagration; Vitebsk–Orsha Offensive (MIA)
- Awards: Knight's Cross of the Iron Cross

Hans Oskar Karl Hahne (30 November 1894 – MIA as of 27 June 1944) was a German officer in the Wehrmacht during World War II who commanded the 197th Infantry Division. He was a recipient of the Knight's Cross of the Iron Cross of Nazi Germany.

Hahne went missing in action on 27 June 1944 near Vitebsk during the Soviet Vitebsk–Orsha Offensive of Operation Bagration; he was posthumously promoted to the rank of Generalmajor.

== Life ==
=== Wehrmacht ===
- 1 October 1934 Regimental adjutant of the Crossen Infantry Regiment (renamed Infantry Regiment 29 on 15 October 1935)
- 15 October 1935 Appointed teacher/instructor at the Hanover War School
- 10 November 1938 Appointed commander of the Replacement Battalion/Infantry Regiment 22 in Gumbinnen
- 1 December 1939 Appointed commander of the II. Battalion/Infantry Regiment 364 at the Arys military training area
  - On 28 December 1939, the II. Battalion with Hahne was transferred to the new Infantry Regiment 371, subordinated to the 161st Infantry Division
- 15 August 1940 Appointed commander of the Infantry Regiment 507
  - arrived at headquarters on 20 August 1940
  - re-designated as Grenadier Regiment 507 on 15 October 1942
- 20 March 1943 Führerreserve (OKH)/Army High Command Leader Reserve
- 15 June 1943 Returned as commander to the Grenadier Regiment 507
- 15 January 1944 Führerreserve (OKH)/Army High Command Leader Reserve
- 3 February to 1 March 1944 Commanded to the 9th Division Commanders' Course in Hirschberg (Silesia)
  - He arrived on 2 February 1944 and took up quarters at the Hotel "Drei Berge".
- 14 March 1944 Commanded to the Army Group Center
  - 22 March to 29 April 1944 delegated with the deputy leadership (m. st. F. b.) of the 197th Infantry Division
- 10 May to 31 May 1944 Delegated with the deputy leadership (m. st. F. b.) of the 299th Infantry Division
  - arrived at headquarters on 11 May 1944
  - submitted for accelerated promotion to Major General on 25 May 1944 by General der Artillerie Georg Pfeiffer
- 1 June 1944 Delegated with the deputy leadership (m. st. F. b.) of the 206th Infantry Division
- 20 June 1944 Delegated with the leadership (m. d. F. b.) of the 197th Infantry Division
  - 24 June 1944 subordinated to the LIII. Army Corps
- 30 June (telex date) with effect from 1 July 1944 Appointed commander of the 197th Infantry Division
  - at this point, he was already missing in action (presumably fallen), a fact of which the HPA (Department P 1 under Lieutenant General Viktor Linnarz) was not yet aware.

== Awards and decorations ==
- Iron Cross (1914), 2nd and 1st Class
  - 2nd Class on 18 November 1915
  - 1st Class on 24 July 1917
- Honour Cross of the World War 1914/1918 with Swords on 28 December 1934
- Commemorative Medal of 9 November 1923 No. 1,495
- Wehrmacht Long Service Award, 4th to 1st Class
  - 4th to 2nd Class on 2 October 1936
  - 1st Class in August 1939
- Repetition Clasp 1939 to the Iron Cross 1914, 2nd and 1st Class
  - 2nd Class on 24 June 1940
  - 1st Class on 26 July 1940
- Winter Battle in the East 1941–42 Medal on 1 September 1942
- Knight's Cross of the Iron Cross on 10 February 1942 as Colonel and Commander of the Infanterie-Regiment 507
- German Cross in Gold on 10 February 1944 as Colonel and Commander of the Infanterie-Regiment 507

== See also ==
- List of people who disappeared

== Sources ==
- German Federal Archives: BArch PERS 6/1326 and PERS 6/299778

Military offices
Preceded by Generalleutnant Eugen Wößner	Commander of 197. Infanterie-Division; 14 March 1944 - 24 June 1944	Succeeded by disbanded
