= 293rd Infantry Division =

- 293. Infanterie-Division
- Active: June 1940 – September 1944
- Country: Nazi Germany
- Allegiance: Wehrmacht
- Branch: Army
- Type: Infantry
- Size: Division
- Garrison/HQ: Berlin, Wehrkreis III
- Nickname: Bear
- Engagements: World War II

The 293rd Infantry Division was a German infantry division in World War II. It was formed on 2 February 1940 and was sent to Belgium in June of 1940 then sent to the English channel in France in July in preparation of Operation Sea Lion. In November it was assigned to Nantes then sent to Poland in march 1941. It took part in operation Barbarossa and it fought at Brest-Litovsk, Pinsk, Kiev, and Bryansk and defended against the Soviet counter offensive in late 1941 and early 1942. It occupied a section near Mzensk from February to September 1942. It fought in the battle of Kursk and Bryansk and took heavy casualties in September at Kharkov. With such losses it was downgraded to Division-Gruppe 293 in November 1943. It was eventually destroyed at Jassy, Romania in August and September 1944. The remnants of the division served as the basis of the 359th Infantry Division and the Divisions-Gruppe 293.

== Noteworthy individuals ==
=== Commanding officers ===
- Generalleutnant Josef Rußwurm, February – 4 June 1940
- Generalleutnant Justin von Obernitz, 4 June 1940 – 19 February 1942
- Generalleutnant Werner Forst, 19 February 1942 – 10 January 1943
- Generalleutnant Karl Arndt, 10 January 1943 – 20 November 1943

=== Others ===
- Willi Stoph, served in the enlisted ranks of the 293rd Infantry Division's artillery regiment; later head of government of East Germany (1964–1973).

== Literature ==
- Tessin, Georg (1974). Verbände und Truppen der deutschen Wehrmacht und Waffen-SS im Zweiten Weltkrieg 1939–1945. Neunter Band. Die Landstreitkräfte 281–370. Biblio-Verlag, Osnabrück. ISBN 3-7648-0872-1.
