= Joachim von Kortzfleisch =

German general

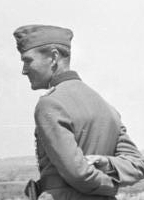
- General Kortzfleisch in Romania, 1941
- Born: 3 January 1890; Braunschweig, German Empire
- Died: 20 April 1945 (aged 55); Sauerland, Germany
- Military career
- Allegiance: German Empire; Weimar Republic; Nazi Germany
- Branch: Army
- Rank: General der Infanterie
- Commands: 1st Infantry Division; Military District III (Berlin)
- Conflicts: World War I World War II
- Awards: Knight's Cross of the Iron Cross

Joachim Otto August Achatius von Kortzfleisch (3 January 1890 – 20 April 1945) was a German general in the Wehrmacht during World War II. As the commander of the Military District III (Berlin), he played a role in the failure of the attempted coup following the 20 July Plot attempt to assassinate Adolf Hitler, which was led by Kortzfleisch's own distant cousin, Claus von Stauffenberg.

== Biography ==
Von Kortzfleisch was born into an aristocratic Westphalian family in Braunschweig, Duchy of Brunswick, the son of the Prussian Major General Gustav von Kortzfleisch (1854–1910) and Elsbeth (née Oppermann; 1862-1937). He joined the army in 1907 and after service in World War I in a machine gun battalion he was an officer in the Reichswehr, reaching the rank of Generalmajor by 1937. He was a Generalleutnant and commander of the 1st Infantry Division at the outbreak of World War II and was awarded the Knight's Cross of the Iron Cross on 1 September 1940 as commander of the XI Army Corps of the Wehrmacht.

== 20 July Plot ==
On 20 July 1944 as the commander of the Military District III (Berlin) Von Kortzfleisch was summoned to the Bendlerstrasse by General Friedrich Fromm. When he arrived, he was perplexed to see that Fromm was no longer in command, that Ludwig Beck was now in control. He angrily refused to obey Operation Valkyrie orders issued by one of the leading conspirators General Friedrich Olbricht and kept shouting ‘the Führer is not dead’ and referring to the oath of loyalty to Hitler. He was arrested and put under guard by the plotters and said that he was not willing to take part in a coup as he was just a soldier interested only in going home and pulling weeds in his garden.

He was replaced in his command by General Karl Freiherr von Thüngen and was later allowed to leave the Bendlerblock. He subsequently interrogated Major Hans-Ulrich von Oertzen, a supporter of the plot. Kortzfleisch was later shocked to learn that the officer leading the plot was his own distant cousin Claus von Stauffenberg, with whom he had attended a wedding the previous year.

== Death ==
In March 1945, Von Kortzfleisch was commanding the Rhine Bridgehead in Army Group B under Field Marshal Walter Model. Kortzfleisch and a handful of soldiers were attempting to move through enemy lines to reach Berleburg, when a patrol of the 737th Tank Battalion of the United States Army encountered them at Schmallenberg-Wulwesort, Sauerland.

The general was surrounded by U.S. soldiers and told to put his hands up. Kortzfleisch refused to comply with this command and was promptly fatally shot in the chest by a U.S. soldier.

== Awards and decorations ==
- Knight's Cross of the Iron Cross on 4 September 1940 as General der Infanterie and commander of XI. Armeekorps

Military offices
Preceded by Generalleutnant Walther Schroth	Commander of 1. Infanterie-Division; 1 January 1938 – 14 April 1940	Succeeded by Generalleutnant Philipp Kleffel
Preceded by General der Artillerie Emil Leeb	Commander of XI. Armeekorps; 1 March 1940 – 6 October 1941	Succeeded by General der Infanterie Eugen Ott
Preceded by General der Infanterie Eugen Ott	Commander of XI. Armeekorps; 10 December 1941 – 1 June 1942	Succeeded by Generaloberst Karl Strecker
Preceded by General der Infanterie Kurt Brennecke	Commander of XXXXIII. Armeekorps; 28 June 1942 - 15 August 1942	Succeeded by General der Infanterie Kurt Brennecke
