= Kurt Versock =

German general

- Versock in 1943
- Born: 14 February 1895
- Died: 17 March 1963 (aged 68)
- Military career
- Allegiance: German Empire; Weimar Republic; Nazi Germany
- Branch: German Army
- Service years: 1914–1945
- Rank: General der Gebirgstruppe
- Commands: 24th Infantry Division; XXXXIII Army Corps
- Conflicts: World War I World War II
- Awards: Knight's Cross of the Iron Cross

Kurt Versock (14 February 1895 – 17 March 1963) was a German general who was awarded the Knight's Cross during World War II.

Versock joined the army in 1914, taking part in World War I. After the war he was retained in the Reichswehr and then served in the Wehrmacht. He took part in the Invasion of Poland in 1939 and Operation Barbarossa as front-line commander. In August 1942, he was awarded the Knight's Cross of the Iron Cross. In May 1943 he appointed commander of the 24th Infantry Division.

In September 1944, he was appointed commander of the XXXXIII Army Corps and tasked with the organization of the coastal defense of the Courland operation. In November 1944 he was promoted to General der Gebirgstruppe. In March 1945 the General Command of the XXXXIII Army Corps was evacuated over sea from the Courland Pocket and added to the 8th army in Northern Hungary. At the end of the war, Kurt Versock surrendered to the American forces.

== Awards ==
- German Cross in Gold (20 June 1944)
- Knight's Cross of the Iron Cross on 25 August 1942 as Oberst and commander of the Infanterie-Regiment 31

Military offices
Preceded by General der Infanterie Hans von Tettau	Commander of 24. Infanterie-Division; 23 February 1943 – 24 February 1944	Succeeded by Generalleutnant Hans Freiherr von Falkenstein
Preceded by Generalleutnant Hans Freiherr von Falkenstein	Commander of 24. Infanterie-Division; 3 June 1944 – 2 September 1944	Succeeded by Generalmajor Harald Schultz
Preceded by General der Infanterie Ehrenfried-Oskar Boege	Commandant du XXXXIII. Armeekorps; 3 September 1944 - 20 April 1945	Succeeded by General der Infanterie Arthur Kullmer
