= Arthur Kullmer =

- Born: 17 August 1896
- Died: 28 March 1953 (aged 56); Sverdlovsk Oblast
- Military career
- Allegiance: Nazi Germany
- Branch: Army (Wehrmacht)
- Rank: General der Infanterie
- Commands: 558th Volksgrenadier Division; XLIII. Armeekorps
- Conflicts: World War II
- Awards: Knight's Cross of the Iron Cross with Oak Leaves

Arthur Kullmer (17 August 1896 – 28 March 1953) was a German general during World War II who commanded several divisions. He was a recipient of the Knight's Cross of the Iron Cross with Oak Leaves of Nazi Germany. Kullmer died on 28 March 1953 in Soviet captivity.

== Awards and decorations ==
- Iron Cross (1914) 2nd Class (29 August 1916) & 1st Class (8 October 1918)
- Clasp to the Iron Cross (1939) 2nd Class (26 May 1940) & 1st Class (12 July 1940)
- German Cross in Gold on 14 January 1942 as Oberstleutnant in Infanterie-Regiment 331
- Knight's Cross of the Iron Cross with Oak Leaves
  - Knight's Cross on 27 October 1943 as Generalleutnant and commander of 296. Infanterie-Division
  - Oak Leaves on 28 February 1945 as Generalleutnant and commander of 558. Volksgrenadier-Division

Military offices
Preceded by Generalleutnant Alfons Hitter	Commander of 106. Infanterie-Division; 1 November 1942 – 10 January 1943	Succeeded by Generalleutnant Werner Forst
Preceded by Generalleutnant Karl Faulenbach	Commander of 296. Infanterie-Division; 10 January 1943 – June 1944	Succeeded by None
Preceded by General der Gebirgstruppen Kurt Versock	Commander of XXXXIII. Armeekorps; 20 April 1945 – 8 May 1945	Succeeded by None
