= Werner Forst =

German general (1892–1971)

- Born: 21 December 1892
- Died: 3 February 1971 (aged 78)
- Military career
- Allegiance: Nazi Germany
- Branch: Army (Wehrmacht)
- Rank: Generalleutnant
- Commands: 293rd Infantry Division; 106th Infantry Division
- Conflicts: World War I World War II
- Awards: Knight's Cross of the Iron Cross with Oak Leaves

Werner Forst (21 December 1892 – 3 February 1971) was a German general during World War II who held several divisional commands. He was a recipient of the Knight's Cross of the Iron Cross with Oak Leaves of Nazi Germany.

== Awards and decorations ==
- Iron Cross (1914) 2nd Class (1 October 1914) & 1st Class (16 September 1916)
- Clasp to the Iron Cross (1939) 2nd Class (26 September 1939) & 1st Class (20 October 1939)
- German Cross in Gold on 14 March 1942 as Oberst in the 293. Infanterie-Division
- Knight's Cross of the Iron Cross with Oak Leaves
  - Knight's Cross on 29 August 1943 as Generalleutnant and commander of 106. Infanterie-Division
  - Oak Leaves on 22 February 1944 as Generalleutnant and commander of 106. Infanterie-Division

Military offices
Preceded by Generalleutnant Justin von Obernitz	Commander of 293. Infanterie-Division; 19 February 1942 - 10 January 1943	Succeeded by Generalleutnant Karl Arndt
Preceded by Generalleutnant Arthur Kullmer	Commander of 106. Infanterie-Division; 10 January 1943 - 20 February 1944	Succeeded by Generalleutnant Siegfried von Rekowski
