= Hermann Flörke =

German general

- Born: 23 October 1893; Hanover, German Empire
- Died: 19 August 1979 (aged 85); Giessen, West Germany
- Military career
- Allegiance: German Empire; Weimar Republic; Nazi Germany
- Branch: Imperial German Army; Reichswehr; German Army (Wehrmacht)
- Service years: 1914–1945
- Rank: Generalleutnant
- Commands: 31st Infantry Division; 14th Infantry Division; LXVI Army Corps
- Conflicts: World War I; World War II; Invasion of Poland; Battle of France; Battle of Smolensk (1943); Operation Bagration; Vitebsk–Orsha Offensive; Lublin–Brest Offensive
- Awards: Knight's Cross of the Iron Cross with Oak Leaves; German Cross in gold

Hermann Flörke (23 October 1893 – 19 August 1979) was a German general during World War II who commanded the 14th Infantry Division. He was a recipient of the Knight's Cross of the Iron Cross with Oak Leaves.

Flörke was born at Hanover in 1893. He entered the Imperial German Army in 1914 at the start of World War I. At the end of the war, he was a Leutnant in Infantry Regiment 74. He remained as a career officer in the post-war Reichswehr, serving as a company commander in Breslau from 1934 to 1935. He was posted to the Reich War Ministry as an Inspector of the Kriegsschule from 1935 to 1939. During World War II, Flörke commanded infantry regiments 53 and 12 through the end of 1942. Promoted to Generalmajor in June 1943, he commanded the 14th Infantry Division from then until December 1944. He was placed in the Führerreserve through April 1945. He commanded LXVI Army Corps in the last month of the war.

== Awards and decorations ==
- Iron Cross (1914) 2nd class (15 June 1915) & 1st class (27 August 1917)
- Knight's Cross of the House Order of Hohenzollern with swords
- Hanseatic Cross of Hamburg
- Wound Badge in black
- Honour Cross of the World War 1914/1918
- Clasp to the Iron Cross (1939) 2nd class (15 October 1939) & 1st class (21 May 1940)
- German Cross in Gold on 23 October 1942 as Oberst in Infanterie-Regiment 12
- Knight's Cross of the Iron Cross with Oak Leaves
  - Knight's Cross on 15 December 1943 as Generalmajor and commander of 14. Infanterie-Division
  - 565th Oak Leaves on 2 September 1944 as Generalleutnant and commander of 14. Infanterie-Division
- Grand Cross of the Order of Merit of the Federal Republic of Germany (10 March 1967)

Military offices
Preceded by Generalleutnant Kurt Pflieger	Commander of 31. Infanterie-Division; 1 April 1943 – 15 May 1943	Succeeded by Generalleutnant Friedrich Hoßbach
Preceded by Generalleutnant Rudolf Holste	Commander of 14. Infanterie-Division; 15 May 1943 – 15 December 1944	Succeeded by Generalleutnant Erich Schneider
Preceded by General der Artillerie Walther Lucht	Commander of LXVI. Armeekorps; March 1945 – April 1945	Succeeded by None
