= Vincenz Müller =

German general and East German politician

Lieutenant General Vincenz Müller
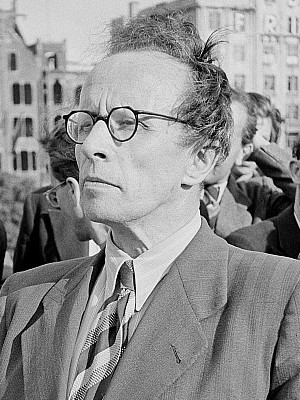
- Müller in 1951

Vice President of the Volkskammer
- In office 1950–1952

Member of the Volkskammer
- In office 1950–1958

Chief of Staff of the National People's Army
- In office 1 March 1956 – 1 March 1958
- President: Wilhelm Pieck
- Prime Minister: Otto Grotewohl
- General Secretary: Walter Ulbricht
- Preceded by: Office Established
- Succeeded by: Heinz Hoffmann

Personal details
- Born: 5 November 1894 Aichach, Kingdom of Bavaria, German Empire
- Died: 15 May 1961 (aged 66) East Berlin, East Germany
- Party: National Democratic Party of Germany
- Awards: Knight's Cross of the Iron Cross; Patriotic Order of Merit

Military service
- Allegiance: German Empire (1908–1918); Kingdom of Württemberg; Weimar Republic (1919–1933); Nazi Germany (1933–1944); NKFD (1944–1945); German Democratic Republic
- Branch/service: Imperial German Army; Army of Württemberg; Reichswehr; German Army; National People's Army
- Years of service: 1908–1945; 1952–1958
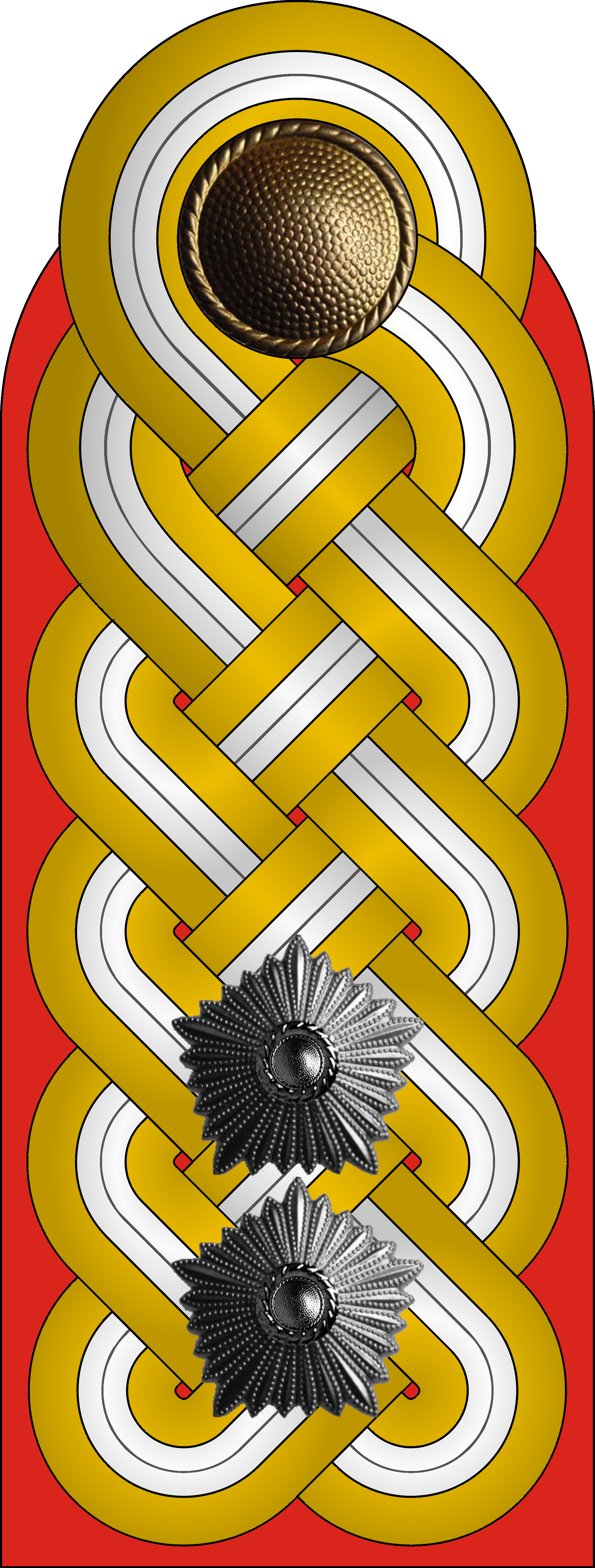
- Rank: Lieutenant General Lieutenant General
- Commands: 57th Infantry Division (1943); 56th Infantry Division (1943–1944); XII Corps (1944); 4th Army (1944)
- Battles/wars: World War I World War II

Vincenz Müller (5 November 1894 – 12 May 1961) was a German military officer and general who served in the Imperial German Army, the Wehrmacht and the National People's Army. Post-war, Müller became a politician and member of the East German parliament, the Volkskammer.

== Early career ==
Müller was born in the Kingdom of Bavaria into a non-military family, being the son of a tanner. He completed high school at the Metten Abbey gymnasium and joined the Württemberg Army's pioneer force. As a lieutenant he spent much of World War I with the German military mission to the Ottoman Empire. He was wounded by a grenade fragment at Gallipoli, and was then transferred to Baghdad and the Persian Front, returning to Germany after contracting malaria and typhus. In 1917 he returned to Turkey as a tactics instructor for Turkish officers.

After the war, he continued to serve with the Reichswehr in a variety of staff roles and was promoted to captain.

== Nazi Germany ==
After Hitler's appointment as chancellor on 30 January 1933, Müller served from 1933 to 1935 as head of the construction of the mobilization system in the General Staff of the Military District Command VII, in Munich. His top superior was Lieutenant General Wilhelm Adam. He then worked until 1937 as head of the mobilization in German General Staff of the army. After visiting the Wehrmacht Academy, Müller served from 1938 to 1940 as First General Staff Officer (Ia) of Army group 2, in Kassel. During this time he was promoted to colonel. During this period, he is known to have had some contact with the conservative anti-Nazi resistance in the army through Erwin von Witzleben, but did not commit himself as an active plotter.

If his political affiliations remained unclear, Müller showed complete willingness to serve the Nazis' military plans and advance his Wehrmacht career. As a staff officer he was involved in planning Operation Tannenbaum, the aborted 1940 invasion of Switzerland, and Operation Barbarossa, the invasion of the Soviet Union. By 1943, Müller had become a Generalleutant (Lieutenant general) and was given command of the 56th Infantry Division, part of Fourth Army of Army Group Centre. By 1944 Müller was commander of XII Corps.

Müller found himself thrust into prominence during events in the Byelorussian SSR in late June 1944. Along with the rest of Fourth Army, the XII Corps was encircled east of Minsk by Soviet forces during the latter's strategic offensive, Operation Bagration. Müller's corps was probably the least-damaged of the trapped forces, and on 3 July he was given overall command of the encircled units of Fourth Army, around 100,000 troops, which by 5 July were as much as 100 km behind Soviet lines. Despite signalling by radio that he was confident that a breakout could be achieved, Müller, who had joined the breakout attempt of the 18th Panzergrenadier Division, was captured by 8 July and most of Fourth Army was destroyed.

== Soviet captivity ==
Müller showed a willingness to cooperate with the Soviets from the time of his capture, issuing an order to troops of the Fourth Army to lay down their weapons.

During his time as a POW, Müller had an apparent change of views and professed to have become an anti-Nazi: within days of his capture he had joined the National Committee for a Free Germany (Nationalkomitee Freies Deutschland, or NKFD) and the Bund Deutscher Offiziere led by Walther von Seydlitz-Kurzbach. He was one of a group of generals captured during Operation Bagration (including Edmund Hoffmeister, the commander of XXXXI Panzer Corps, and Rudolf Bamler of the 12th Infantry Division) who became especially prominent in NKFD activity. Unlike many of his colleagues, however, Müller claimed to have become a staunch Communist. Along with Bamler, Müller is known to have attended special training in Krasnogorsk late in 1944, and is believed to have been recruited by the Soviet secret services to spy on fellow NKFD members, such as Friedrich Paulus.

== The German Democratic Republic ==
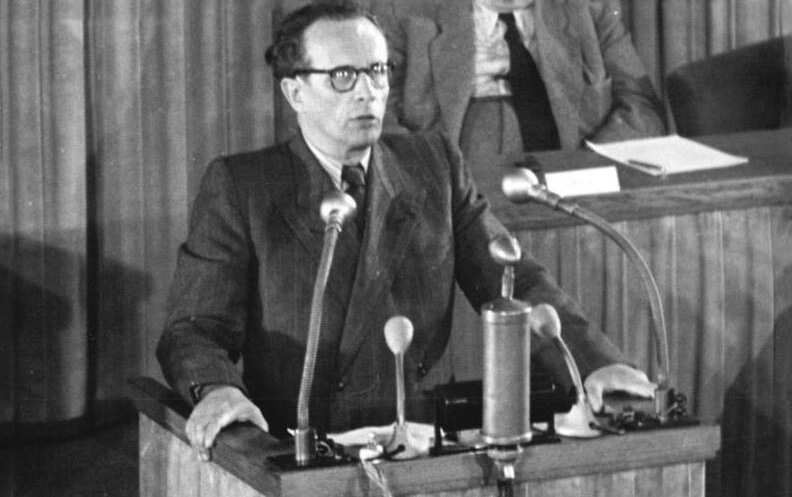
Müller (NDPD) speaking in the Volkskammer, 15 September 1951

Vincenz Müller was released relatively early from Soviet captivity, in 1948, and joined the National Democratic Party of Germany, the NDPD. From 1949 to 1952 he was the party's deputy chairman and was Vice-President of the East German parliament, the Volkskammer. During this period he is believed to have continued to act as an informant for East German state security.

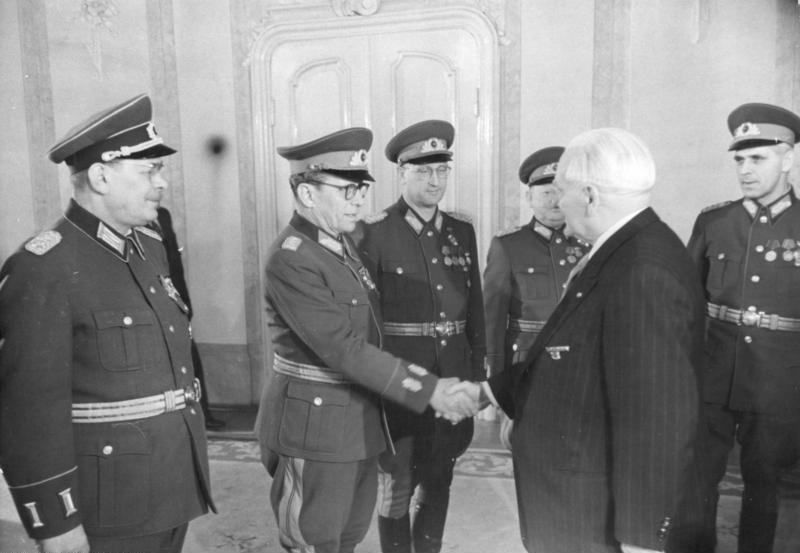
Vincenz Müller congratulates DDR President Wilhelm Pieck, 1957

After 1952, Vincenz Müller returned to a military career and was given the responsibility of reconstructing East Germany's armed forces; he was returned to the rank of Lieutenant-General. After heading the Ministry of the Interior, and successfully developing the Volkspolizei, he was appointed the Chief of Staff of the newly formed National People's Army - effectively the second-in-command of the East German military behind Willi Stoph. Müller's later career is perhaps the most significant example of the East German regime's use of former Nazis and military officers, the so-called Ehemaligen, in reconstructing its state apparatus. He was, however, known to be in favour of the independence of the NVA from the Soviet military, and to have maintained some contacts in the West through military and Bavarian circles (Western intelligence services in fact attempted to persuade Müller to defect during this period). He is also known to have conducted secret discussions with the West German Finance Minister, Fritz Schäffer, on a possible détente between East and West Germany.

After being gradually sidelined, Müller retired in 1958 amidst longstanding concerns over his loyalty to the East German administration, and came under increasing pressure from the Stasi. He was said to be suffering from schizophrenia, and was hospitalised for a period in 1960; allegations also resurfaced that he had been involved in the mass killing of 1,300 Jews in Artemovsk in 1941 and the shooting of POWs.

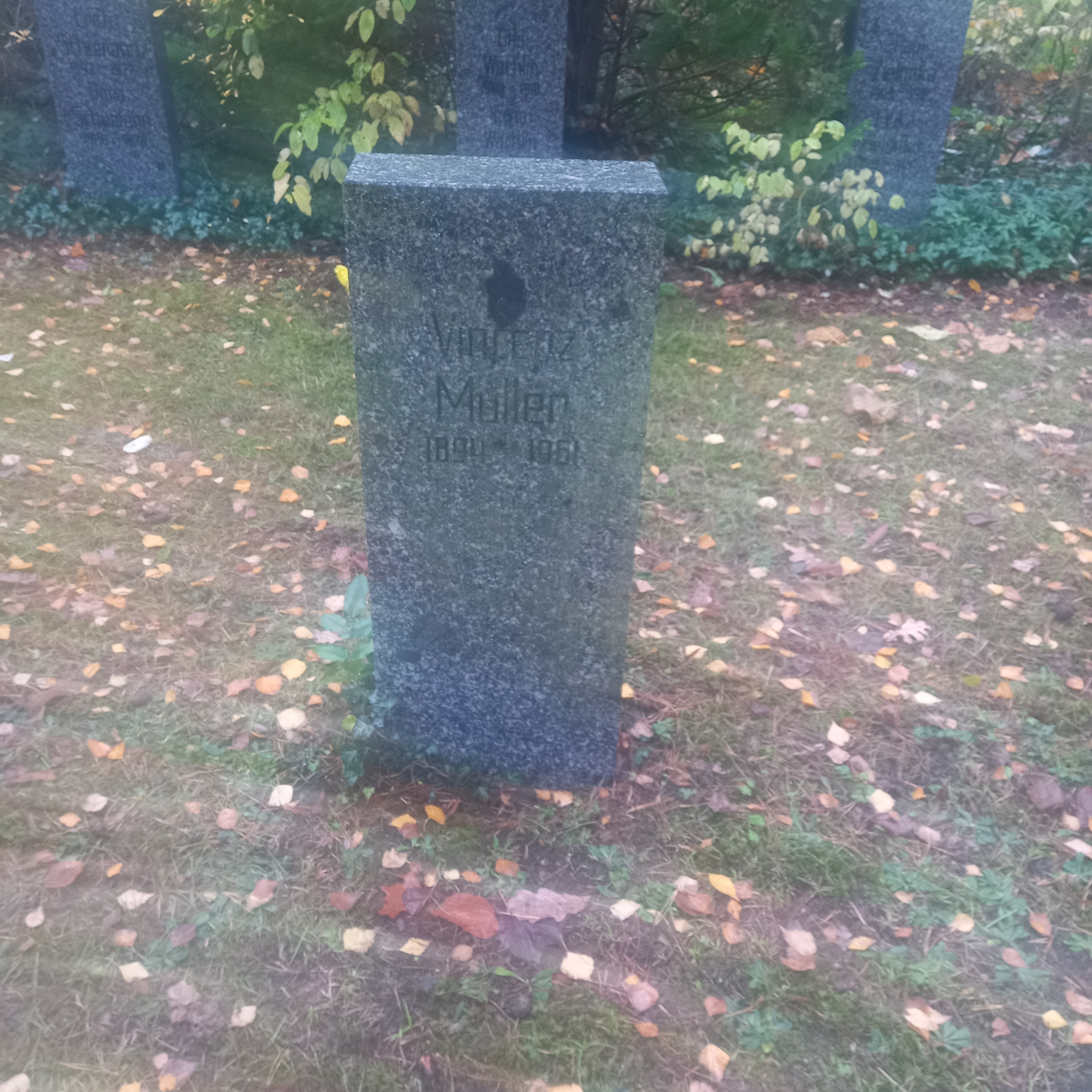
Tomb of Vincenz Müller in the cemetery of Adlershof in Berlin

He died in 1961, in somewhat controversial circumstances, as he fell from the balcony of his home on the day he was scheduled to return to hospital; it was rumoured that he had committed suicide when a police vehicle drew up outside.

A posthumous autobiography, Ich fand das wahre Vaterland (English: I found the true fatherland), was published in 1963, edited by Klaus Mammach, an SED historian.

== Awards and decorations ==
- Iron Cross of 1914, 1st and 2nd class
- Wound Badge (1918) in Black
- Knight's Cross Second Class of the Friedrich Order with Swords
- Order of the Medjidie, 5th Class with Swords (Ottoman Empire)
- Silver Liakat Medal with Swords (Ottoman Empire)
- Ottoman War Medal (Turkish: Harp Madalyası; "Gallipoli Star", "Iron Crescent") (Ottoman Empire)
- Iron Cross of 1939, 1st and 2nd class
- German Cross in Gold (26 January 1942)
- Knight's Cross of the Iron Cross (7 April 1944)
- Patriotic Order of Merit in Gold (East Germany)

Military offices
Preceded by Generalmajor Otto Fretter-Pico	Commander of 57. Infanterie-Division; 1 September 1943 – 19 September 1943	Succeeded by Generalmajor Adolf Eduard Trowitz
Preceded by Generalmajor Otto-Joachim Lüdecke	Commander of 56. Infanterie-Division; Commander of Korpsabteilung D 19 September 1943 – 4 June 1944	Succeeded by Generalmajor Edmund Blaurock
Preceded by General der Infanterie Kurt von Tippelskirch	Commander of XII. Armee Corps; 4 June – 5 July 1944	Succeeded by Corps destroyed
Preceded by General der Infanterie Kurt von Tippelskirch	Commander of 4. Armee; 30 June 1944 - 7 July 1944	Succeeded by General der Infanterie Kurt von Tippelskirch
Preceded by New Office	Chief of Staff of the National People's Army; 1 March 1956–1 March 1958	Succeeded by Heinz Hoffmann
