= Harald Schultz =

German military personnel

- Born: 10 November 1895; Riga, Governorate of Livonia, Russian Empire (now Riga, Latvia)
- Died: 15 March 1957 (aged 61); Lübeck, Schleswig-Holstein, West Germany
- Military career
- Allegiance: Russian Empire; Latvia; Nazi Germany
- Branch: German Army
- Service years: 1940–1945
- Rank: Lieutenant Colonel; Generalmajor
- Commands: 24th Infantry Division
- Conflicts: World War I; Latvian War of Independence; World War II; Operation Barbarossa; Battle of Białystok–Minsk; Battle of Smolensk (1941); Battle of Moscow; Battle of Kursk; Courland Pocket
- Awards: Knight's Cross of the Iron Cross

Harald Schultz (Latvian: Haralds Šulcs; 10 November 1895 – 15 March 1957) was a German general during World War II and a recipient of the Knight's Cross of the Iron Cross of Nazi Germany. Schultz surrendered to the Soviet forces in the Courland Pocket in 1945. Convicted as a war criminal in the Soviet Union, he was held until 1955.

== Awards and decorations ==
- German Cross in Gold on 21 February 1944 as Oberst in Artillerie-Regiment 205
- Knight's Cross of the Iron Cross on 5 April 1945 as Generalmajor and commander of 24. Infanterie-Division

== Citations and references ==
=== Cited sources ===
- Patzwall, Klaus D.; Scherzer, Veit (2001). Das Deutsche Kreuz 1941 – 1945 Geschichte und Inhaber Band II [The German Cross 1941 – 1945 History and Recipients Volume 2] (in German). Norderstedt, Germany: Verlag Klaus D. Patzwall. ISBN 978-3-931533-45-8.
- Scherzer, Veit (2007). Die Ritterkreuzträger 1939–1945 Die Inhaber des Ritterkreuzes des Eisernen Kreuzes 1939 von Heer, Luftwaffe, Kriegsmarine, Waffen-SS, Volkssturm sowie mit Deutschland verbündeter Streitkräfte nach den Unterlagen des Bundesarchives [The Knight's Cross Bearers 1939–1945 The Holders of the Knight's Cross of the Iron Cross 1939 by Army, Air Force, Navy, Waffen-SS, Volkssturm and Allied Forces with Germany According to the Documents of the Federal Archives] (in German). Jena, Germany: Scherzers Militaer-Verlag. ISBN 978-3-938845-17-2.

Military offices
Preceded by General der Gebirgstruppe Kurt Versock	Commander of 24. Infanterie-Division; 3 September 1944 – 8 May 1945	Succeeded by None
