= Werner Kienitz =

German general (1885–1959)

- Born: 3 June 1885
- Died: 31 December 1959 (aged 74)
- Military career
- Allegiance: German Empire; Weimar Republic; Nazi Germany
- Branch: Army
- Service years: 1910–1945
- Rank: General of the Infantry
- Commands: 24th Infantry Division; XVII. Armeekorps
- Conflicts: World War II
- Awards: Knight's Cross of the Iron Cross

Werner Kienitz (3 June 1885 – 31 December 1959) was a German general in the Wehrmacht during World War II who commanded the XVII. Corps. He was a recipient of the Knight's Cross of the Iron Cross of Nazi Germany.

== Awards ==
- Knight's Cross of the Iron Cross on 31 August 1941 as General der Infanterie and commander of XVII. Armeekorps

Military offices
Preceded by None	Commander of 24. Infanterie-Division; 15 October 1935 – 1 April 1938	Succeeded by Generalleutnant Sigisimund von Förster
Preceded by None	Commander of XVII. Armeekorps; 1 April 1938 – 23 January 1942	Succeeded by General der Infanterie Karl-Adolf Hollidt
