= Kurt Pflieger =

WWII German military officer

- Born: 18 May 1890
- Died: 19 September 1958 (aged 68)
- Military career
- Allegiance: German Empire; Weimar Republic; Nazi Germany
- Branch: Army
- Service years: 1909–1920; 1934–1945
- Rank: Generalleutnant
- Commands: 337th Infantry Division; 31st Infantry Division; 416th Infantry Division
- Conflicts: World War II
- Awards: Knight's Cross of the Iron Cross

Kurt Pflieger (19 September 1890 – 19 September 1958) was a general in the Wehrmacht of Nazi Germany during World War II who commanded several divisions. He was a recipient of the Knight's Cross of the Iron Cross.

== Awards and decorations ==
- Knight's Cross of the Iron Cross on 10 February 1945 as generalleutnant and commander of 416th Infantry Division

Military offices
Preceded by Generalleutnant Karl Spang	Commander of 337th Infantry Division; 19 May 1941 – 15 March 1942	Succeeded by General der Artillerie Erich Marcks
Preceded by Oberst Friedrich Hoßbach	Commander of 31st Infantry Division; 24 February 1942 – 1 April 1943	Succeeded by Oberst Hermann Flörke
