= Gerhard Berthold =

German general (1891–1942)

- Born: 12 March 1891; Schneeberg
- Died: 14 April 1942 (aged 51); Kaluga Oblast, Soviet Union
- Military career
- Allegiance: German Empire; Weimar Republic; Nazi Germany
- Branch: Army
- Rank: Generalleutnant (Posthumously)
- Commands: 31st Infantry Division; XXXXIII Army Corps
- Conflicts: World War I World War II
- Awards: Knight's Cross of the Iron Cross

Gerhard Berthold (12 March 1891 – 14 April 1942) was a German general in the Wehrmacht of Nazi Germany during World War II who commanded several divisions. He was a recipient of the Knight's Cross of the Iron Cross. Berthold was killed on 14 April 1942 in Zaytseva Gora, Russia. He was posthumously promoted to Generalleutnant.

== Awards and decorations ==
- Clasp to the Iron Cross (1939) 2nd Class (15 September 1939) & 1st Class (1 October 1939)
- Knight's Cross of the Iron Cross on 4 December 1941 as Generalmajor and commander of 31. Infanterie-Division

Military offices
Preceded by Generalmajor Kurt Kalmukoff	Commander of 31. Infanterie-Division; 13 August 1941 – 20 January 1942	Succeeded by Oberst Friedrich Hoßbach
Preceded by General der Infanterie Gotthard Heinrici	Commander of XXXXIII Army Corps; 20 January 1942 - 1 February 1942	Succeeded by General der Infanterie Kurt Brennecke
