= HPA =

HPA may refer to:

== Organizations ==
- Harry Potter Alliance, a charity
- Halifax Port Authority, Canada
- Hamburg Port Authority, Germany
- Hawaii Preparatory Academy, a school in Hawaii, US
- Health Protection Agency, UK
- Heerespersonalamt, the German Army Personnel Agency 1920-1944
- Hollywood Post Alliance, an American trade organization
- Houston Peace Academy of the Islamic Education Institute of Texas, US
- Hurlingham Polo Association, UK polo governing body
- HPA Toucan human-powered aircraft built by Hertfordshire Pedal Aeronauts

== People ==
- Hans Peter Anvin (born 1972), Swedish computer programmer
- Howlin' Pelle Almqvist (Born 1978), Swedish lead singer of garage rock band The Hives

== Science ==
- Hectopascal (hPa), a unit of pressure
- Human platelet antigen
- Human Protein Atlas
- Hydrogen pinch analysis
- Hypothalamic–pituitary–adrenal axis in physiology

== Technology ==
- High-performance addressing, in LCD displays
- Host protected area of computer data storage
- Human-powered aircraft
- High-pressure air, in paintball guns
- Horizontal Pod Autoscaling, the Kubernetes autoscaler.

== Transport ==
- Honor Oak Park railway station (National Rail station code), in London, England
- Lifuka Island Airport, in Tonga

== Other uses ==
- Highland Prince Academy de Mexico, a group of schools in Tijuana
- Hydraulic Project Approval, an approval for hydraulic projects granted by the Washington State Department of Fish and Wildlife (WDFW)
