= Kurów Wielki =

- Village
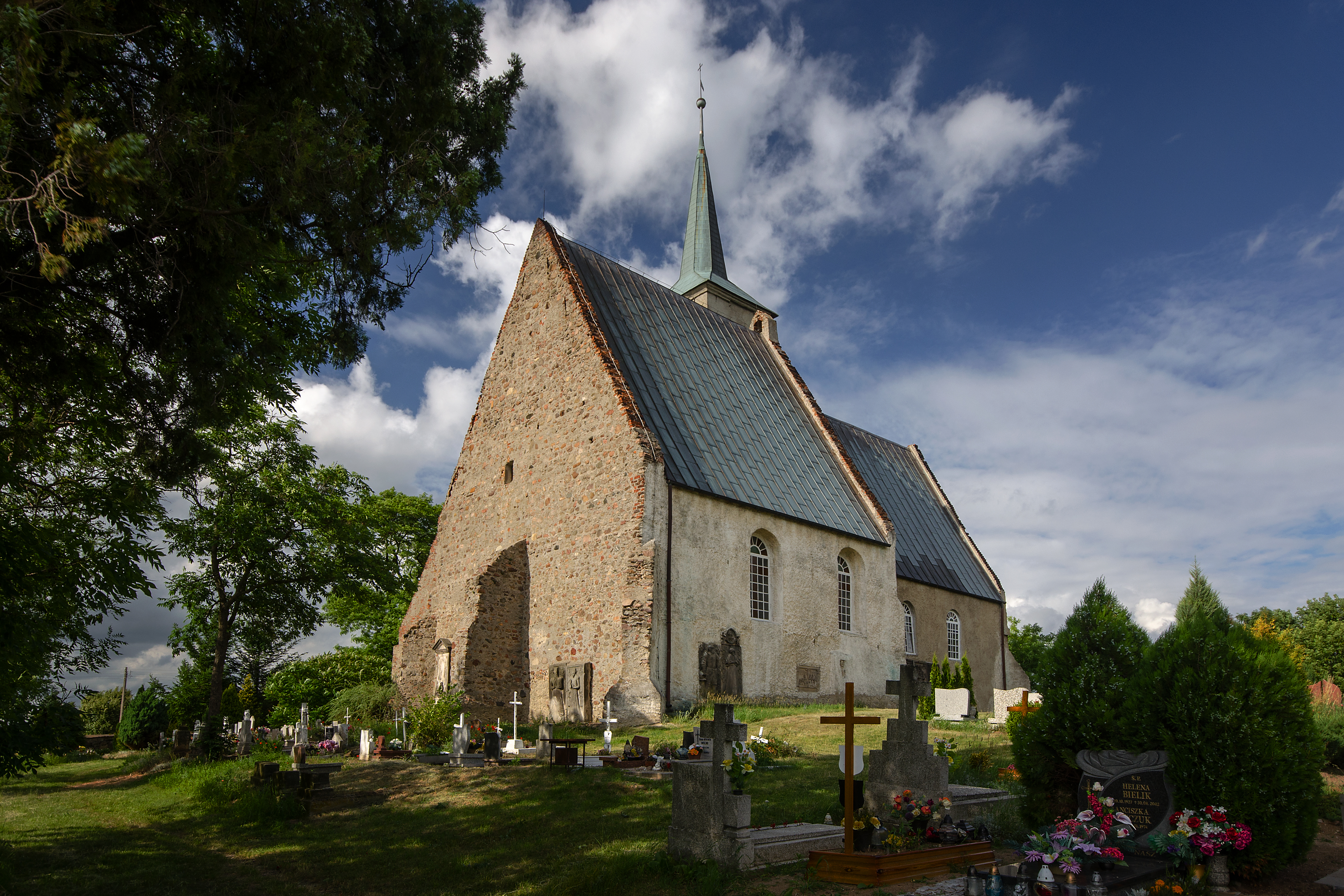
- Saint John the Baptist church in Kurów Wielki

- Location within Poland
- Coordinates: 51°36′00″N 16°05′00″E
- Country: Poland
- Voivodeship: Lower Silesian
- County: Polkowice
- Gmina: Gaworzyce
- First mentioned: 1266
- Population: 50
- Time zone: UTC+1 (CET)
  - Summer (DST): UTC+2 (CEST)
- Vehicle registration: DPL

Kurów Wielki (Polish pronunciation: [ˈkuruv ˈvjɛlkʲi]) is a village in the administrative district of Gmina Gaworzyce, within Polkowice County, Lower Silesian Voivodeship, in south-western Poland.

== History ==
The oldest known mention of the village is from 1266 when it was part of the Duchy of Głogów within the fragmented Piast-ruled Poland. At that time, was owned by Jan of Kurów, a member of the Kurowie noble family, and a Polish knight in service of Konrad I, Duke of Głogów. In the 18th century, the village was annexed by Prussia. From 1871 to 1945, it was also part of Germany until the end of World War II, before being reintegrated with Poland following Nazi Germany's defeat in 1945.

== Sights ==
Among the notable monuments in Kurów Wielki are a Gothic parish church of Saint John the Baptist from the 14th century, and a tower in the same style. There are tombstones and epitaphs built into the church walls and the wall around the church and the cemetery. A presbytery from the late 18th century is located next to the church.

== Notable residents ==
- Karl Arndt (1892–1981), German general
