= 106th Infantry Division (Wehrmacht) =

- 106. Infanterie-Division
- Active: 22 November 1940 – 8 April 1945
- Country: Nazi Germany
- Branch: Army
- Type: Infantry
- Size: Division
- Engagements: World War II

The 106th Infantry Division (German: 106. Infanterie-Division) was a German division in World War II. It was formed in 1940 in Wahn.
The division was destroyed by the end of August 1944 during the Soviet Jassy–Kishinev Offensive.

== Commanding officers ==
- General der Infanterie Ernst Dehner, 28 November 1940 – 3 May 1942
- Generalleutnant Alfons Hitter, 3 Mai 1942 – 1 November 1942
- Generalleutnant Arthur Kullmer, 1 November 1942 – 1 January 1943
- Generalleutnant Werner Forst, 1 January 1943 – 20 February 1944
- Generalleutnant Siegfried von Rekowski, 20 February 1944 – August 1944
- Oberst Rintenberg,
