= Ehrenfried-Oskar Boege =

German general and Knight's Cross recipient

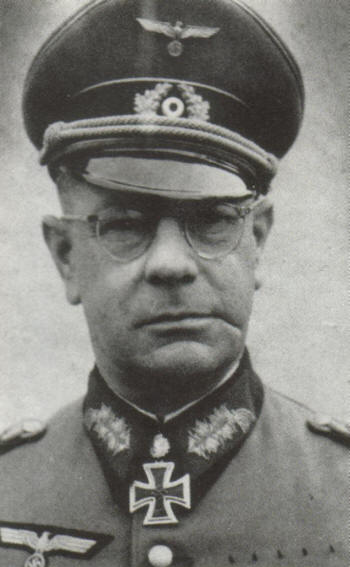
- Born: 11 November 1889; Ostrowo
- Died: 31 December 1965 (aged 76); Hildesheim
- Military career
- Allegiance: German Empire; Weimar Republic; Nazi Germany
- Branch: German Army
- Service years: 1913–1945
- Rank: General der Infanterie
- Commands: 197th Infantry Division; XXXXIII Army Corps; 18th Army
- Conflicts: World War I; World War II; Annexation of the Sudetenland; Invasion of Poland; Battle of France; Operation Barbarossa; Battle of Smolensk (1941); Battle of Moscow; Battle of Smolensk (1943); Courland Pocket
- Awards: Knight's Cross of the Iron Cross with Oak Leaves

Ehrenfried-Oskar Boege (11 November 1889 – 31 December 1965) was a German general during World War II who held several corps level commands. He was a recipient of the Knight's Cross of the Iron Cross with Oak Leaves of Nazi Germany.

Boege surrendered to the Soviet forces in May 1945 in the Courland Pocket. Convicted as a war criminal in the Soviet Union, he was held until 1955.

== Awards and decorations ==
- Iron Cross (1914) 2nd Class (30 September 1914) & 1st Class (6 February 1917)
- Clasp to the Iron Cross (1939) 2nd Class (16 June 1940) &1st Class (16 June 1940)
- German Cross in Gold on 13 January 1943 as Generalmajor and commander of the 197. Infanterie-Division
- Knight's Cross of the Iron Cross with Oak Leaves
  - Knight's Cross on 22 December 1941 as Oberst and commander of Infanterie-Regiment 7
  - Oak Leaves on 21 September 1944 as General der Infanterie and commander of XXXXIII. Armee-Korps

Military offices
Preceded by Generalleutnant Hermann Meyer-Rabingen	Commander of 197. Infanterie-Division; 1 April 1942 – 5 November 1943	Succeeded by Generalleutnant Eugen Wößner
Preceded by General der Infanterie Karl von Oven	Commander of XXXXIII. Armeekorps; 25 March 1944 – 3 September 1944	Succeeded by General der Gebirgstruppen Kurt Versock
Preceded by General der Artillerie Herbert Loch	Commander of 18th Armee; 5 September 1944 – 8 May 1945	Succeeded by None
