= Kurt Brennecke =

- Born: 16 December 1891; Ringelheim, German Empire
- Died: 30 December 1982 (aged 91); Bonn, West Germany
- Military career
- Allegiance: German Empire (to 1918); Weimar Republic (to 1933); Nazi Germany
- Branch: Heer
- Service years: 1910–1945
- Rank: General der Infanterie
- Commands: XXXXIII. Armeekorps
- Conflicts: World War I World War II: Annexation of Austria; Invasion of Poland; Battle of France; Operation Barbarossa; Siege of Leningrad; Demyansk Pocket
- Awards: Knight's Cross of the Iron Cross

Kurt Brennecke (16 December 1891 – 30 December 1982) was a General der Infanterie in the Wehrmacht during World War II who commanded the XXXXIII. Armeekorps. He was also a recipient of the Knight's Cross of the Iron Cross. Kurt Brennecke was captured by American troops in May 1945 and was released in March 1948.

== Awards and decorations ==
- Knight's Cross of the Iron Cross on 22 February 1942 as General der Infanterie and commander of XXXXIII. Armeekorps
- Order of Merit of the Federal Republic of Germany

Military offices
Preceded by None	Chief of Staff of 4. Armee; 1 August 1939 – 25 October 1940	Succeeded by Generalmajor Günther Blumentritt
Preceded by Previously Heeresgruppe C	Chief of Staff of Heeresgruppe Nord; 22 June 1941 – January 1942	Succeeded by Generalleutnant Wilhelm Hasse
Preceded by Generalleutnant Gerhard Berthold	Commander of XXXXIII. Armeekorps; 1 February 1942 – 28 June 1942	Succeeded by General der Infanterie Joachim von Kortzfleisch
Preceded by General der Infanterie Joachim von Kortzfleisch	Commander of XXXXIII. Armeekorps; 15 August 1942 – 23 January 1943	Succeeded by General der Infanterie Karl von Oven
