= Hans von Tettau =

German general and Knight's Cross recipient (1888–1956)

- Born: 30 November 1888; Bautzen, German Empire
- Died: 30 January 1956 (aged 67) Mönchengladbach, West Germany
- Allegiance: German Empire; Weimar Republic; Nazi Germany
- Branch: Army
- Service years: 1909–1945
- Rank: General of the Infantry
- Commands: 24th Infantry Division
- Conflicts: Second World War
- Awards: Knight's Cross of the Iron Cross with Oak Leaves
- Other work: Author

Hans von Tettau (30 November 1888 – 30 January 1956) was a German general (General of the Infantry) in the Wehrmacht during World War II who held commands at the divisional and corps level. He was a recipient of the Knight's Cross of the Iron Cross with Oak Leaves of Nazi Germany. Tettau surrendered to the Allied forces in May 1945; he was released in 1947. He wrote a book with General Kurt Versock called The History of the 24th Infantry Division.

Although much decorated, Tettau's reputation is debatable. Some German historians argue that he had little real military experience up to his countermeasures at the Battle of Arnhem in 1944, the Allied Operation Market Garden. Fellow generals spoke of Tettau, whose regular work in the army was more that of an inspector than of a commanding officer, in a negative way when he organised his defences in the Netherlands under the name of Westgruppe, which was not a formal army division. Instead, this was seen as a political move by Tettau to gain credit in Berlin.

== Awards and decorations ==
- Iron Cross (1914) 2nd Class (18 September 1914) & 1st Class (18 September 1915)
- Clasp to the Iron Cross (1939) 2nd Class (22 September 1939) & 1st Class (5 October 1939)
- German Cross in Gold on 5 May 1942 as Generalleutnant and commander of 24. Infanterie-Division
- Knight's Cross of the Iron Cross with Oak Leaves
  - Knight's Cross on 3 September 1942 as Generalleutnant and commander of 24. Infanterie-Division
  - 821st Oak Leaves on 5 April 1945 as Generalleutnant and commander of Korpsgruppe von Tettau

Military offices
Preceded by Generalleutnant Justin von Obernitz	Commander of 24. Infanterie-Division; 14 June 1940 – 23 February 1943	Succeeded by General der Gebirgstruppen Kurt Versock
