= Friedrich Hossbach =

German Wehrmacht general (1894–1980)

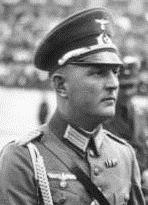
- Hossbach in 1934
- Born: 22 November 1894; Unna, German Empire
- Died: 10 September 1980 (aged 85); Göttingen, West Germany
- Military career
- Allegiance: German Empire; Weimar Republic; Nazi Germany
- Branch: German Army
- Service years: 1913–1945
- Rank: General der Infanterie
- Commands: 82nd Infantry Division; LVI Panzer Corps; 4th Army
- Conflicts: World War I World War II
- Awards: Knight's Cross of the Iron Cross with Oak Leaves

Friedrich Hossbach (22 November 1894 – 10 September 1980) was a German staff officer in the Wehrmacht who, as a military adjutant to Adolf Hitler in 1937, created the document detailing Hitler's expansionist plans. It later became known as the Hossbach Memorandum.

== Early life ==
Hossbach joined the Imperial German Army in 1913 and served throughout World War I, finishing the war as an Oberleutnant and orderly officer on the staff of XVIII Army Corps. He remained in the post-war Reichswehr of the Weimar Republic, as a career officer. Assigned to the general staff, he was the army adjutant to Adolf Hitler from 1934 to 1938.

== Career ==
As Hitler's adjutant, Hossbach created the document that later became known as the Hossbach Memorandum, a report of a meeting held on 5 November 1937 between Hitler and Feldmarschall Werner von Blomberg, General Werner von Fritsch, Admiral Erich Raeder, Generaloberst Hermann Göring, Baron Konstantin von Neurath and Hossbach. The account of Hossbach was found among the Nuremberg papers, where it was an important piece of evidence.

In early 1938, Hossbach was present when Hitler was presented by Goering with a file purporting to show that General von Fritsch, the commander-in-chief of the Army, was guilty of homosexual practices. In defiance of Hitler's orders, Hossbach took the file to Fritsch to warn him of the accusations that he was about to face. Fritsch gave his word as an officer that the charges were untrue, and Hossbach passed that message back to Hitler. That did not, as it might have, cost Hossbach his life, but he was dismissed from his post as Hitler's adjutant two days later.

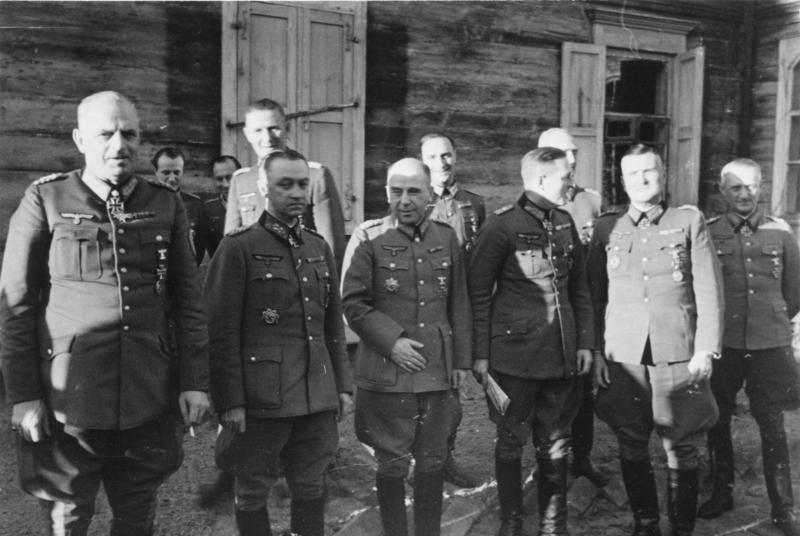
General Hossbach (4th from left) in the Soviet Union, with Field Marshal Ernst Busch, General Hans Krebs, General Rudolf von Roman, Colonel General Walter Weiß and General Hans Speth, May 1944

Hossbach returned to the general staff in 1939 and was promoted to major general on 1 March 1942. Exactly five months later, he was promoted again to lieutenant general, and his last promotion occurred on 1 November 1943, when he became general of infantry and was given command of the LVI Panzer Corps. He spent the next two years on the eastern front. He took over as commander of the Fourth Army on 28 January 1945 but was dismissed two days later for defying Hitler's orders and withdrawing his troops from East Prussia in fear of a second Stalingrad. While receiving medical care in Göttingen, Hossbach was taken prisoner by the US Army.

== Awards ==
- Iron Cross (1914) 2nd Class (26 September 1914) & 1st Class (26 May 1916)
- Hanseatic Cross of Hamburg
- Military Merit Cross of Austria-Hungary, 3rd class with war decoration
- Wound Badge in black
- Honour Cross of the World War 1914/1918
- Clasp to the Iron Cross (1939) 2nd Class (11 May 1940) and 1st Class (30 May 1940)
- Honour Roll Clasp of the Army (22 July 1941)
- Knight's Cross of the Iron Cross with Oak Leaves
  - Knight's Cross on 7 October 1940 as Oberst and commander of Infanterie-Regiment 82
  - Oak Leaves on 11 September 1943 as Generalleutnant and acting commander of LVI. Panzerkorps

Military offices
Preceded by Generalmajor Gerhard Berthold	Commander of 31. Infanterie-Division; 20 January 1942 – 24 February 1942	Succeeded by Generalleutnant Kurt Pflieger
Preceded by Generalleutnant Josef Lehmann	Commander of 82. Infanterie-Division; 1 April 1942 – 6 July 1942	Succeeded by Generalleutnant Alfred Bäntsch
Preceded by Oberst Hermann Flörke	Commander of 31. Infanterie-Division; 15 May 1943 – 2 August 1943	Succeeded by Oberst Kurt Moehring
Preceded by General der Panzertruppe Ferdinand Schaal	Commander of LVI Panzer Corps; 1 August 1943 – 14 November 1943	Succeeded by General der Infanterie Anton Grasser
Preceded by General der Infanterie Anton Grasser	Commander of LVI Panzer Corps; 9 December 1943 – 14 June 1944	Succeeded by General der Infanterie Johannes Block
Preceded by General der Infanterie Kurt von Tippelskirch	Commander of 4. Armee; 18 July 1944 – 29 January 1945	Succeeded by General der Infanterie Friedrich-Wilhelm Müller
