= Hermann Meyer-Rabingen =

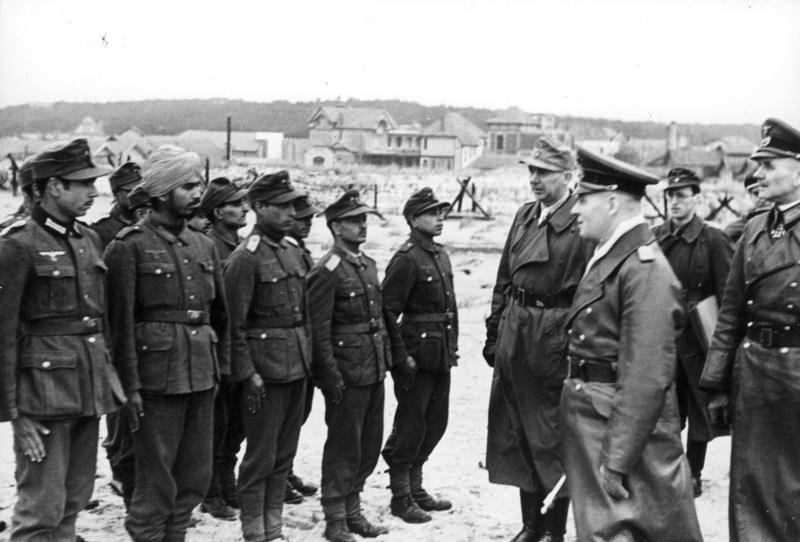
- Hermann Meyer-Rabingen (right) inspecting the Indian Legion with Erwin Rommel (center).
- Born: 7 August 1887
- Died: 21 February 1961 (aged 73)
- Military career
- Allegiance: Nazi Germany
- Branch: Army
- Rank: Generalleutnant
- Commands: 197th Infantry Division
- Conflicts: World War II
- Awards: Knight's Cross of the Iron Cross

Hermann Meyer-Rabingen (7 August 1887 – 21 February 1961) was a German general in the Wehrmacht during World War II. He was a recipient of the Knight's Cross of the Iron Cross.

He commanded the 197th Infantry Division beginning on 1 December 1939, initially serving in the rank of Generalmajor. On 1 November 1941, he was promoted to the rank of Generalleutnant. On 1 April 1942, he was replaced as commander of the 197th Division by Ehrenfried-Oskar Boege.

Meyer-Rabingen went on to be appointed commander of the 159th Infantry Division on 20 September 1942.

== Awards and decorations ==
- Knight's Cross of the Iron Cross on 12 January 1942 as Generalleutnant and commander of 197. Infanterie-Division.

Military offices
Preceded by None	Commander of 197. Infanterie-Division; 1 December 1939 - 1 April 1942	Succeeded by General der Infanterie Ehrenfried-Oskar Boege
