= Otto-Joachim Lüdecke =

Otto Joachim Lüdecke
- Born: 27 May 1894; Staßfurt, Kreis Halle an der Saale, Province of Saxony, Kingdom of Prussia, German Empire
- Died: 14 February 1971 (aged 76); Hassel, Lower Saxony, West Germany
- Relatives: ∞ 1920 Erica Schiele, 4 children
- Military career
- Allegiance: German Empire (to 1918); Weimar Republic (to 1933); Nazi Germany
- Branch: Prussian Army; Imperial German Army; Reichswehr; Heer
- Service years: 1913–1945
- Rank: Generalleutnant
- Commands: 56. Infanterie-Division; 264. Infanterie-Division
- Conflicts: World War I World War II: Invasion of Poland; Battle of France; Operation Barbarossa; Battle of Białystok–Minsk; Battle of Smolensk (1941); Battle of Kursk; Battle of Smolensk (1943)
- Awards: Knight's Cross of the Iron Cross

Otto Joachim Lüdecke (27 May 1894 – 14 February 1971) was a highly decorated Generalleutnant in the Wehrmacht during World War II. He was wounded twice in WWI and twice severely in WWII. He was also a recipient of the Knight's Cross of the Iron Cross. The Knight's Cross of the Iron Cross, and its variants were the highest awards in the military and paramilitary forces of Nazi Germany during World War II. Lieutenant General Lüdecke was captured by American troops in May 1945, he was handed over the British troops and held until 1948.

== Promotions ==
- 24 September 1913 Fahnenjunker (Officer Candidate)
- 27 January 1914 Fahnenjunker-Gefreiter (Officer Candidate with Lance Corporal rank)
- 27 March 1914 Fahnenjunker-Unteroffizier (Officer Candidate with Corporal/NCO/Junior Sergeant rank)
- 19 June 1914 Fähnrich (Officer Cadet)
- 22 September 1914 Leutnant (2nd Lieutenant) without Patent
  - 6 June 1918 received Patent from 19 February 1913
- 20 June 1918 Oberleutnant (1st Lieutenant)
- 31 January 1927 Hauptmann (Captain) with effect from 1 February 1927
- 1 September 1934 Major
- 16 March 1937 Oberstleutnant (Lieutenant Colonel) with effect from 1 March 1937
- 29 February 1940 Oberst (Colonel) with effect from 1 March 1940
- 20 April 1943 Generalmajor (Major General) with effect from 1 April 1943
- 1 October 1943 Generalleutnant (Lieutenant General)

== Awards and decorations ==
- Iron Cross (1914), 2nd and 1st Class
  - 2nd Class on 19 September 1914
  - 1st Class on 27 January 1916
- Wound Badge (1918) in Black
- Reich Sport Badge in Silver
- Honour Cross of the World War 1914/1918 with Swords
- Wehrmacht Long Service Award, 4th to 1st Class
  - 2nd Class on 2 October 1936
  - 1st Class on 15 November 1938
- Hungarian Order of Merit, Commander's Cross of 19 October 1938
- Sudetenland Medal
- Repetition Clasp 1939 to the Iron Cross 1914, 2nd and 1st Class
  - 2nd Class on 6 October 1939
  - 1st Class on 10 June 1940
- Wound Badge (1939) in Silver
- Certificate of Recognition from the Commander-in-Chief of the Army for outstanding achievements on the battlefield on 15 July 1941
- Eastern Front Medal on 8 August 1942
- Knight's Cross of the Iron Cross on 8 August 1943 as Generalmajor and commander of 56. Infanterie-Division

Military offices
Preceded by Generalleutnant Karl von Oven	Commander of 56. Infanterie-Division; 28 January 1943 – 1 September 1943	Succeeded by Generalleutnant Vincenz Müller
Preceded by Generalleutnant Albin Nake	Commander of 264. Infanterie-Division; 19 April 1944 – 15 May 1944	Succeeded by General der Infanterie Martin Gareis
