= Karl Arndt =

German general (1892–1981)

- Born: 10 March 1892; Groß Kauer, District of Glogau, Province of Silesia, German Empire present-day Kurów Wielki, Poland
- Died: 30 December 1981 (aged 89); Langenholthausen, North Rhine-Westphalia, West Germany
- Military career
- Allegiance: German Empire; Weimar Republic; Nazi Germany
- Branch: Army (Wehrmacht)
- Service years: 1911–1945
- Rank: Generalleutnant
- Commands: 293rd Infantry Division; 359th Infantry Division; XXXIX Panzer Corps
- Conflicts: World War II: Invasion of Poland; Battle of France; Operation Barbarossa; Battle of Kiev; Battle of Moscow; Battle of Kursk; Belgorod-Khar'kov Offensive Operation; Lower Dnieper Offensive; Lower Silesian Offensive; Upper Silesian Offensive; Prague Offensive
- Awards: Knight's Cross of the Iron Cross with Oak Leaves

Karl Hermann Arndt (10 March 1892 – 30 December 1981) was a German general in the Wehrmacht during World War II who commanded several divisions. He was a recipient of the Knight's Cross of the Iron Cross with Oak Leaves of Nazi Germany.

== Awards and decorations ==
- Iron Cross (1914) 2nd Class (3 October 1914) 1st Class (26 January 1918)
- Honour Cross of the World War 1914/1918 (31 December 1934)
- Wehrmacht Long Service Award 1st Class (2 October 1936)
- Iron Cross (1939) 2nd Class (27 October 1939) & 1st Class (17 June 1940)
- German Cross in Gold on 2 July 1944 as Generalleutnant in the 359. Infanterie-Division
- Knight's Cross of the Iron Cross with Oak Leaves
  - Knight's Cross on 23 January 1942 as Oberst and commander of Infanterie-Regiment 511
  - Oak Leaves on 1 February 1945 as Generalleutnant and commander of 359. Infanterie-Division

Military offices
Preceded by Generalleutnant Werner Forst	Commander of 293. Infanterie-Division; 10 January 1943 – 2 November 1943	Succeeded by Unit Disbanded
Preceded by Formed from 293. Infanterie-Division	Commander of 359. Infanterie-Division; 20 November 1943 – 25 April 1945	Succeeded by None
Preceded by General der Panzertruppe Karl Decker	Commander of XXXIX. Panzerkorps; 25 April 1945 – 8 May 1945	Succeeded by None
