= Ernst König =

German general (1908–1986)

- Born: 12 August 1908; Fulda, Regierungsbezirk Kassel, Province of Hesse-Nassau, Kingdom of Prussia, German Empire
- Died: 18 March 1986 (aged 77); Göttingen, West Germany
- Military career
- Allegiance: Weimar Republic; Nazi Germany
- Branch: Police; Army
- Service years: 1927–1935; 1935–1945
- Rank: Generalmajor
- Commands: 31st Infantry Division; 28th Jäger Division
- Conflicts: World War II
- Awards: Knight's Cross of the Iron Cross with Oak Leaves

Ernst Heinrich Hans Georg König (12 August 1908 – 3 March 1986) was a German general in the Wehrmacht of Nazi Germany during World War II. He was a recipient of the Knight's Cross of the Iron Cross with Oak Leaves.

== Awards and decorations ==
- DRA German Gymnastics and Sports Badge (Deutsches Turn- und Sportabzeichen) in Bronze on 16 July 1928
- Wehrmacht Long Service Award, 4th to 3rd Class
  - 4th Class on 2 October 1936
  - 3rd Class on 11 May 1939
- Iron Cross (1939) 2nd and 1st Class
  - 2nd Class on 1 October 1939
  - 1st Class on 10 October 1940
- Wound Badge (1939) in Black and Silver
  - Black on 10 July 1940
  - Silver on 10 January 1944
- Infantry Assault Badge in Silver on 7 October 1940
- Eastern Front Medal on 28 August 1942
- Close Combat Clasp in Bronze on 1 January 1943
- German Cross in Gold on 7 March 1942 as Hauptmann in the III./Infanterie-Regiment 82
- Knight's Cross of the Iron Cross with Oak Leaves
  - Knight's Cross on 16 September 1943 as Major and commander of Grenadier-Regiment 12
  - 598th Oak Leaves on 21 September 1944 as Oberst and commander of Grenadier-Regiment 12

== Sources ==
- German Federal Archives: BArch PERS 6/1485 and PERS 6/300034

Military offices
Preceded by Generalleutnant Willifrank Ochsner	Commander of 31. Infanterie-Division; June 1944 – 1 July 1944	Succeeded by Oberst Hans-Joachim von Stolzmann
Preceded by Generalleutnant Gustav Heistermann von Ziehlberg	Commander of 28. Jäger-Division; 20 November 1944 – 11 April 1945	Succeeded by Oberst Hans Tempelhoff
