= XXXXIII Army Corps (Wehrmacht) =

XXXXIII. Armeekorps
- Active: 15 April 1940 – 8 May 1945
- Country: Nazi Germany
- Branch: Army
- Size: Corps
- Engagements: World War II: Battle of France; Operation Barbarossa; Battle of Białystok–Minsk; Battle of Kiev (1941); Battle of Moscow; Battle of Nevel (1943); Battle of Narva (1944); Courland Pocket; Bratislava–Brno Offensive

Commanders
- Notable commanders: Gotthard Heinrici

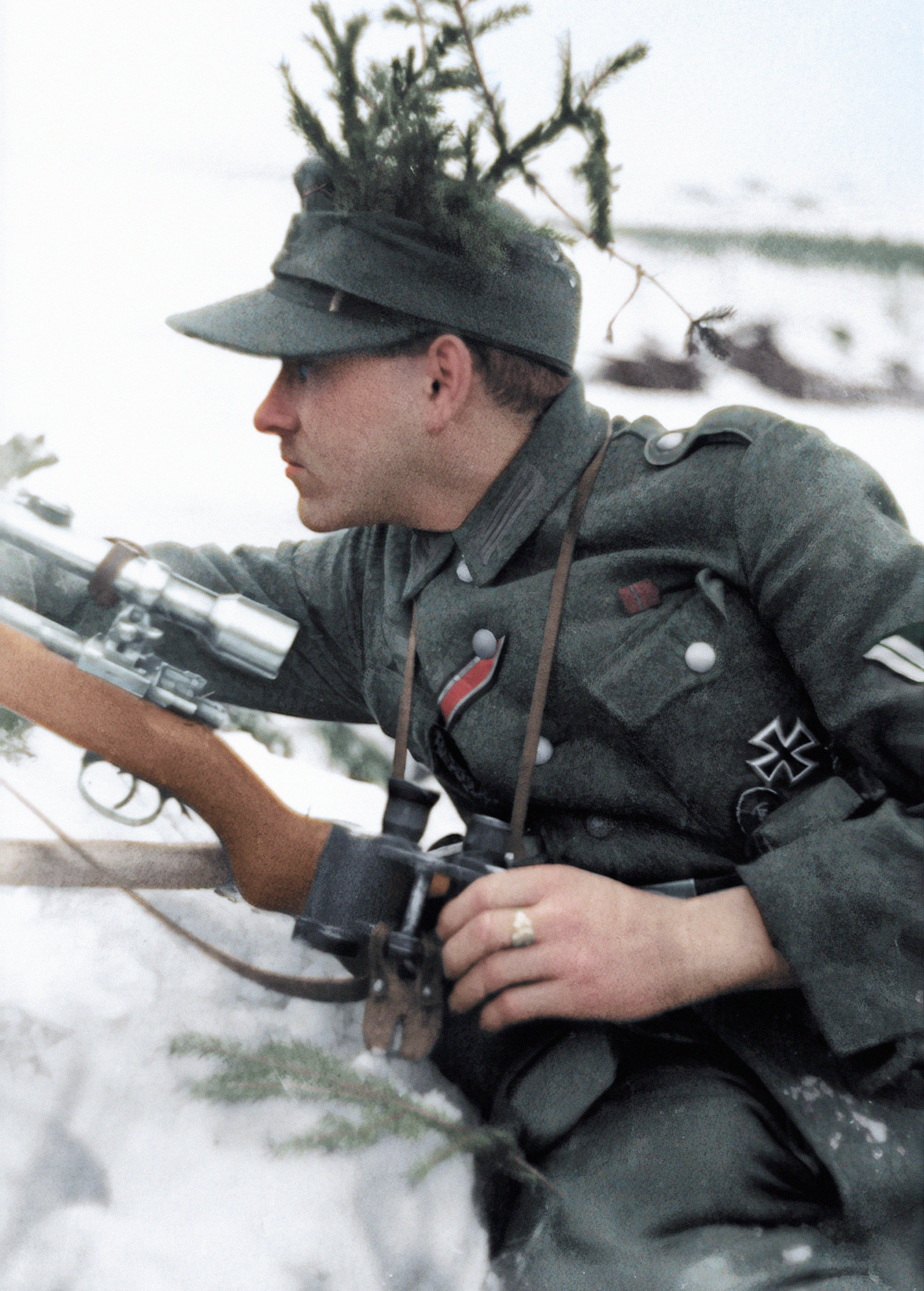

XXXXIII Army Corps (XXXXIII. Armeekorps) was a corps in the German Army during World War II.

== Operations ==
The XXXXIII. Army Corps was created on 15 April 1940 in military district XI (Weimar).

It participated in the Battle of France, where it played only a secondary role. After the French capitulation it occupied the Channel coast in the area of Rouen.

In June 1941, it participated in Operation Barbarossa as part of the 4th Army. It fought in the Battle of Białystok–Minsk and Battle of Kiev (1941). In November 1941, it reached the city of Aleksin on the Oka River but was pushed back towards Spas-Demensk by the Soviet counter offensive in the Battle of Moscow.

It stayed in Spa-Demansk during 1942 and was moved to Velikiye Luki in 1943, where it was involved in the Battle of Nevel (1943). In March 1944, it became part of Armee-Abteilung Narwa and fought in the Battle of Narva (1944). In Autumn 1944, the Corps was locked up in the Courland Pocket.

In March 1945 the General Command was evacuated over sea from the Courland Pocket and added to the 8th army in Northern Hungary. After the loss of the Danube bridgehead at Gran and the offensive of the 2nd Ukrainian Front, the Corps had to evacuate Slovakia and pull back to Znojmo (now Czech Republic).
In mid-April the Corps was deployed to defend against the Soviet 23rd and 68th Rifle Corps in Weinviertel in Lower Austria.
The General Command surrendered to the Americans in the Linz area in May 1945.

== Commanders ==
- General der Artillerie Hermann Ritter von Speck : 1 May - 31 May 1940
- General der Gebirgstruppe Franz Böhme : 31 May - 17 June 1940
- Generaloberst Gotthard Heinrici : 17 June 1940 - 20 January 1942
- Generalmajor Gerhard Berthold : 20 January - 19 February 1942 (acting)
- General der Infanterie Kurt Brennecke : 19 February - 27 June 1942
- General der Infanterie Joachim von Kortzfleisch : 28 June - 15 August 1942
- General der Infanterie Kurt Brennecke : 15 August 1942 - 23 January 1943
- General der Infanterie Karl von Oven : 24 January 1943 - 25. March 1944
- Generalleutnant Ehrenfried-Oskar Boege : 25 - 31 March 1944 (acting)
- General der Infanterie Ehrenfried-Oskar Boege : 1 April - 3 September 1944
- General der Gebirgstruppen Kurt Versock : 3 September 1944 - 20 April 1945
- Generalleutnant Arthur Kullmer : 20 April - 8 May 1945

== See also ==
- List of German corps in World War II

== Source ==
- "XXXXIII. Armeekorps". Lexikon der Wehrmacht.
- "XXXXIII. Armeekorps". Axis history.
