= 24th Infantry Division (Wehrmacht) =

- Active: October 1935 – May 1945
- Country: Nazi Germany
- Branch: Army
- Type: Infantry
- Size: Division
- Engagements: Second World War: Polish Campaign; Battle of the Bzura; French Campaign; Eastern Front; Battle of Uman; Battle of Kiev (1941); Siege of Sevastopol; Siege of Leningrad; Sinyavino Offensive (1942); Courland Pocket

The 24th Infantry Division (German: 24. Infanterie-Division) was a German Army infantry division active in World War II. It served across the Eastern Front in engagements such as the Sieges of Sevastopol and the Leningrad, finally being destroyed in the Courland Pocket in 1945.

== History ==
=== Formation and the Polish Campaign ===
The 24th Infantry Division was raised on 15 October 1935 in Chemnitz, and was placed under the command of Lieutenant General Werner Kienitz until April 1938, when command was passed to Lieutenant General Sigismund von Förster. In November, Lieutenant General Friedrich Olbricht was appointed commander. The 171st Infantry Regiment was separated from this division in August 1939 and handed over to the newly activated 56th Infantry Division, while elements of the 24th Infantry's staff were given to 87th Infantry Division.

The division was first deployed into action in September 1939 during the Soviet-German invasion of Poland, as part of X Corps in the newly formed 8th Army. The division attacked through Silesia in south-west Poland, but the components of X Corps began to stretch out over a wide area. Despite Colonel General von Rundstedt warning the 8th Army's commander about the weakness, little was evidently done, as they soon encountered fierce Polish resistance along the Bzura before turning northwards to the river Vistula. On September 5, the division was on the banks of the Warta and attempting to cross the river. Resisting heavy Polish anti-personnel fire, the arrival of the 10th Infantry Division helped the 24th substantially in clearing the banks. The division entered Glinno at the end of the day.

Moving near the village of Piatek with the 30th Infantry Division, and the 1st Panzer Division near the banks of the Vistula, some eight Polish army divisions remained hidden from German intelligence in between them and the 4th Panzer Division outside Warsaw. At the end of the campaign, one-third of the division's dead were assessed to have perished along the Bzura river; 155 men were killed in action and another 433 wounded.

Remaining in occupied Poland until December, the division was then sent back to Eifel as a reserve division for the 12th Army for the duration of the eastern campaign. The following February, Lieutenant General Friedrich Olbricht was replaced by Obernitz.

Although a number of records relating to the 24th Infantry Division were destroyed in a fire, it can be deduced that the actions of the 102nd Regiment were significant enough to earn its regimental commander, Otto von Knobelsdorff, a divisional commendation.

=== The French Campaign ===
In May 1940, the 12th Army attacked France by entering via Luxembourg; the 24th Division took part as a component of VI Corps. Unfortunately, their advance was slowed thanks to an earlier panzer advance having made driving difficult for mobilized units. Reaching the border with Belgium, the corps did not wait to clear away resistance, resulting in their infantry divisions and the 2nd and 6th Panzer Divisions taking casualties. Over the course of May 15 – 17, German forces occupied and reoccupied the village of Stonne as they fought French tanks. The 16th and 24th Infantry Divisions took over from the 10th Panzer Division and Infantry Regiment Großdeutschland. The two occupied the village for the last time at 1745, with French resistance in the area being present until May 25.

In June, it was transferred to VII Corps of the 16th Army, and sent across the Meuse under its new commander, General of the Infantry Hans von Tettau. In July, with the Battle of France over, the positioning of divisions was relaxed and the 24th, now part of the 9th Army's IV Corps, continued to police the country, being moved to the Scheldt estuary along the Belgium-Netherlands border. The division continued to police the estuary in April 1941, albeit now as part of the XXXVII Corps. During the quieting-down period, regiment-level cadres were handed over to the newly activated 113th Infantry Division.

=== Barbarossa and the Crimea ===
In May 1941, the division was moved back to occupied Poland, being stationed in Galicia with IV Corps, which was now part of the 17th Army. The following month the Wehrmacht made a major assault on the Soviet Union, with the 17th Army, part of Army Group South, attacking and occupying the Ukrainian city of Vinnytsia. August saw the 24th Division's temporary assignment to XXXXIV Corps of the 1st Panzergruppe as it took part in the Mass-encirclement of Soviet troops south of Uman; the next month saw the division's return to IV Corps as it took Kiev. During the Battle of Kiev, the 24th Infantry Division attacked from Kremenchuk in the south-east along the Dnieper, assisting in the encirclement of the Ukrainian capital. The division remained as an occupying force until the end of October; Army Group South, meanwhile continued onwards to the black sea without it. In their time as an occupational force, some level of confusion was present amongst the men, who were baffled by the Soviet's technological sophistication in relation to propaganda portrayals, particularly with educational material. On October 15 a report from the division was filed regarding the Soviet POWs they were transporting - 1,000 had been killed from exhaustion and executions in the long marches. Also in the report was a complaint over the state of the POW camps; Oleksandriya's camp #182 held accommodation for only 20,000, with Novoukrainka only 10,000 - this was not enough to house the impressive figures the Germans had already encircled with their Blitzkrieg tactics. This report was brought up in a war crimes trial that included General of the Infantry Karl von Roques, who received the report.

Re-joining Army Group South in the Crimea, the division was moved to the 11th Army's LIV Corps. With the Soviet forces in the region too well-defended for Erich von Manstein's army to defeat, the axis forces instead besieged the city-turned-fortress of Sevastopol until June 1942, when they finally made an assault on the port. On June 9 the division took control of the Mekenziyevy Mountain train station, and Fort Stalin on the 13th. On the 17th, aided much by elements of the 197th Sturmgeschütz Battalion, forts "Dnepr"; "GPU" and "Molotov" fell on the same day.

Bartenyevka was captured on the 18th, followed by an anti-aircraft battery on Malenkhov hill and an armoured train later in June. On June 28, elements of the 24th Infantry and the 22nd Air Landing Infantry Division crossed a stretch of the North Bay in an operation to flank the Red Army's rear. The next day, the rest of the two divisions crossed the Severnaya Bay to continue the assault. By the end of the siege the division had lost 30% of its men: recorded at being 11,148 on June 1, by July 1 it was at 8,811.

=== Leningrad and the Courland Pocket ===
Shortly after their success in the Crimea, the 24th Infantry Division was sent northwards as part of Army Group A with the 11th Army's XXX Corps to participate in Operation Nordlicht.

However, the Soviet 8th Army broke seven kilometres into the German lines around Leningrad from just west of Gaytolovo as part of the Sinyavino Offensive; as such, the 24th and 170th Infantry Divisions; 5th Mountain and 28th Jäger Divisions first had to reinforce the 11th and 18th Army elements already present before their own arrival on the 28th. The following month the division then participated in the counter-offensive, moving from the south to pocket the Soviet force.

On February 19, 1943, the 102nd Grenadier Regiment launched an attack on the Kaliningrad town of Novokolhoznoe (also known as "Tschernyschewo"). The muddy terrain made the attack largely-ineffective, and two support tanks attached to the 502nd Heavy Panzer Battalion were stuck. The division went through a command change the following week, with General of the Mountain troops Kurt Versock, an Iron Cross recipient, taking over. In March 1943 Soviet activity around Lake Ladoga was revived as sixteen Red Army divisions prepared a pincer movement in the hopes of recapturing the Kirov railway line desperately needed for supplying the city. Resisting the attack were the 24th and 215th Infantry Divisions; the 4th SS Polizei Division and the Spanish "Blue Division", which all made up L Corps.

The division remained along the Volkhov Front into January 1944. On January 16 the Soviet VI Rifle Corps made contact with a regiment of the 24th's, which was sent by XXXVIII Corps to defend the Novgorod railway lines needed for transport. With more pressure from Soviet forces, Colonel General Georg Lindemann ordered German forces in the area to abandon Novgorod; the division retreated in response. With the immediate area around Leningrad re-captured by the Soviets, the 18th Army was pushed westward to Pskov.

During the retreat, Lieutenant General Versock was wounded, and his role was replaced by Lieutenant General Hans Freiherr von Falkenstein, while the division moved southward to the 16th Army's position in Polotsk in April. The division went through yet another command change as the situation became dire: General Kurt Versock retook command in June.

On 22 June the 1st Baltic Front began pushing into the German lines at Vitebsk; in reaction, the division was given to Army Group North to defend Polotsk with the 3rd Panzer Army and 909th Assault Gun Brigade. Colonel General Lindemann, the new commander-in-chief of Army Group North Ukraine, ordered both the 24th and 190th Infantry Divisions to defend his far-right flank from the oncoming Soviet forces. The following day, the 24th Anti-Tank Battalion engaged the Soviet I Tank Corps while the 24th Engineer Regiment charged into enemy lines to cover the 252nd Infantry Division's retreat. While doing so the division came under heavy fire in the forests, requiring the assistance of the 909th Assault Gun Brigade and the 519th Heavy Tank Destroyer Battalion. Under heavy fire and losing contact with divisions to his left and right, Versock withdrew to the north to re-join I Corps on the night of June 24. The following day Adolf Hitler ordered I Corps to halt their withdrawal, and extended their front by sixty miles, and that Army Group North was to counterattack to the forests in the south.

On June 27, the division succeeded in delaying the advance of the Soviet 6th Guards Army at Obol, protecting the left flank of the 16th Army; the city, itself was lost later that day, however. On June 30, Polotsk was reinforced, per Adolf Hitler's orders, in order to stop the Soviet's 43rd Army. The 4th Shock Army and 6th Guards Army reached the city outskirts on July 2 and the city centre the following day.

August saw a brief return to the 18th Army, who remained in Latvia, before being sent back to the 16th Army in October under Major General Harald Schultz; Versock had been promoted to commander of XXXXIII Corps in September. In October, it and the 18th Army were encircled within the Courland Pocket; both armies remained sealed by the Soviets, who did not consider too much of a threat, as "Army Group Courland" until their surrenders at the end of the war on May 9, 1945; Schultz was taken prisoner and was not released until 1955.

== Components ==
1939

- 31st Grenadier Regiment
- 32nd Grenadier Regiment
- 102nd Grenadier Regiment
- 24th Reconnaissance detachment
- 24th Artillery Regiment
- 24th Monitoring detachment
- 24th Engineer Battalion
- 24th Anti-tank Battalion
- 24th Signal Battalion
- 24th Reserve Battalion
- 24th Supply unit

1942

- 31st Grenadier Regiment
- 32nd Grenadier Regiment
- 102nd Grenadier Regiment
- 24th Motorcycle detachment
- 24th Artillery Regiment
- 24th Engineer Battalion
- 24th Anti-tank Battalion
- 24th Signal Battalion
- 24th Supply unit

1943

- 31st Grenadier Regiment
- 32nd Grenadier Regiment
- 102nd Grenadier Regiment
- 24th Fusilier Battalion
- 24th Artillery Regiment
- 24th Engineer Battalion
- 24th Anti-tank Battalion
- 24th Signal Battalion
- 24th Field-replacement Battalion
- 24th Supply detachment

== Commanders ==
- Major General Werner Kienitz (15 October 1935 – 1 April 1938)
- Lieutenant General Sigismund von Förster (1 April – 10 November 1938)
- Major General Friedrich Olbricht (10 November 1938 – 15 February 1940)
- Major General Justin von Obernitz (15 February – 14 June 1940)
- General of the Infantry Hans von Tettau (14 June 1940 – 14 February 1943)
- Colonel Ernst-Anton von Krosigk (14 February 1943)
- Colonel Kurt Versock (23 February – June 10, 1943)
- Major General Walter Wissmath (June 10 - July 6, 1943)
- Major General Kurt Versock (July 6, 1943 – 19 February 1944)
- Colonel Kurt Opelt (February 19–24, 1944)
- Lieutenant General Hans Freiherr von Falkenstein (24 February – 3 June 1944)
- General of Mountain Forces Kurt Versock (3 June – 2 September 1944)
- Colonel Harald Schultz (3 September 1944 – 8 May 1945)
