= Karl von Oven =

- Born: 29 November 1888; Charlottenburg near Berlin, Province of Brandenburg, Kingdom of Prussia, German Empire
- Died: 20 January 1974 (aged 85); Singen am Hohentwiel, Baden-Württemberg, West Germany
- Relatives: ∞ 1921 Marie Elisabeth Freiin von Lüttwitz; 2 children General der Infanterie Karl Adolf von Oven (father)
- Military career
- Allegiance: German Empire; Weimar Republic; Nazi Germany
- Branch: Prussian Army; Imperial German Army; Freikorps; Preliminary Reichswehr; Police; Heer
- Service years: 1908–1945
- Rank: General der Infanterie
- Commands: 393. Infanterie-Division; 56th Infantry Division; XXXXIII Army Corps
- Conflicts: World War I World War II: Poland Campaign; Operation Barbarossa; Battle of Kiev (1941); Battle of Moscow; Battle of Kursk; Battle of Narva (1944)
- Awards: Knight's Cross of the Iron Cross

Adolf Karl von Oven (29 November 1888 – 20 January 1974) was a German officer, finally General der Infanterie during World War II who commanded several corps. He was a recipient of the Knight's Cross of the Iron Cross of Nazi Germany.

== Promotions ==
- 27 February 1908 Fähnrich (Officer Cadet)
- 27 January 1909 Leutnant (2nd Lieutenant) with Patent from 14 June 1907 (112)
- 24 December 1914 Oberleutnant (1st Lieutenant)
- 5 October 1916 Hauptmann (Captain)

=== Police ===
- 2 November 1919 Hauptmann der Sicherheitspolizei with effect from 1 November 1919
- 29 September 1923 Polizeimajor (Major of the Police)
- 21 March 1933 Polizeioberstleutnant (Lieutenant Colonel of the Police) with effect from 1 April 1933
- 14 September 1933 Oberst der Landespolizei (Colonel of the State Police) with effect from 1 September 1933

=== Wehrmacht ===
- 15 March 1935 Oberstleutnant with Rank Seniority (RDA) from 1 January 1934 (3a)
- 1 October 1935 Oberst (Colonel)
- 31 May 1939 Generalmajor (Major General) with effect and RDA from 1 June 1939 (11)
- 14 June 1941 Generalleutnant (Lieutenant General) with effect and RDA from 1 July 1941 (2)
- 10 March 1943 General der Infanterie (General of the Infantry) with effect and RDA from 1 April 1943 (1)

== Awards and decorations ==
- Iron Cross (1914), 2nd and 1st Class
- Military Merit Cross (Austria-Hungary), 3rd Class with the War Decoration (ÖM3K)
- Wound Badge (1918) in Mattweiß (Silver)
- Silesian Eagle Order, II. and I. Grade
- Knight of Honour (Ehrenritter) of the Order of Saint John (Bailiwick of Brandenburg)
- Honour Cross of the World War 1914/1918 with Swords on 1 December 1934
- Wehrmacht Long Service Award, 4th to 1st Class
- Repetition Clasp 1939 to the Iron Cross 1914 (1939), 2nd and 1st Class
  - 2nd Class on 15 September 1939
  - 1st Class on 5 October 1939
- Winter Battle in the East 1941–42 Medal on 14 August 1942
- Knight's Cross of the Iron Cross on 9 January 1942 as Generalleutnant and Commander of 56. Infanterie-Division

Military offices
Preceded by Generalleutnant Paul von Hase	Commander of 56. Infanterie-Division; 15 November 1940 – 24 January 1943	Succeeded by Generalmajor Otto-Joachim Lüdecke
Preceded by General der Infanterie Kurt Brennecke	Commander of XXXXIII. Armeekorps; 24 January 1943 – 25 March 1944	Succeeded by General der Infanterie Ehrenfried-Oskar Boege
