= 56th Infantry Division (Wehrmacht) =

- 56. Infanterie-Division
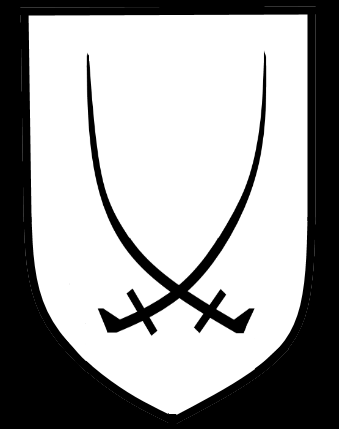
- 56. Infanterie Division Vehicle Insignia
- Active: 1939–1945
- Country: Nazi Germany
- Branch: Army
- Type: Infantry
- Size: Division
- Engagements: World War II: Battle of France; Battle of Moscow; Battle of Kursk; Operation Bagration; East Prussian Offensive

The 56th Infantry Division (German: 56. Infanterie-Division; nicknamed Gekreuzte Säbel, 'crossed sabres', after the divisional symbol) was a German infantry division which fought during World War II.

Formed in late August 1939, it participated in occupation duty in Poland before fighting in the Battle of France. The 56th spent mid-1940 in Belgium, then returned to Poland in the early northern hemisphere fall, fighting in Operation Barbarossa, the German invasion of the Soviet Union. The division spent the rest of its existence on the Eastern Front, participating in the Battle of Moscow and the Battle of Kursk, suffering heavy losses in the latter. In late 1943 the division was dissolved and its headquarters used to form Corps Detachment D, which was destroyed during Operation Bagration. The headquarters of the latter was again used to reform the division in East Prussia in September 1944, but it was again destroyed in the Heiligenbeil Pocket in early 1945.

== History ==
The division was formed on 26 August 1939 in Dresden, in the second wave of mobilisation, mainly from Saxon reservists in Wehrkreis IV. It included the 171st Infantry Regiment from the 24th Infantry Division, the 192nd Infantry Regiment from the 4th Infantry Division, and the 234th Infantry Regiment from the 14th Infantry Division. Assigned to the 14th Army in Poland, the division was tasked with collecting Polish stragglers. The division fought in the Battle of France in May 1940 against the British Expeditionary Force, remaining in Belgium after the fall of Dunkirk. Transferred to Poland in September, the 56th provided cadres for the formation of the 294th and 304th Infantry Divisions there.

After taking part in the Invasion of France in 1940, it spent the remainder of its existence on the Eastern Front, mostly with Army Group Centre. One of its early commanders was Paul von Hase, later executed for his role in the Widerstand, the German resistance movement.

Following heavy losses in 1943, the division was dissolved and its staff (along with remnants of Infantry Regiments 171 and 234) was incorporated into Korps-Abteilung D together with elements of the similarly depleted 262nd Infantry Division. This was itself largely destroyed to the west of Vitebsk when Third Panzer Army failed to hold the salient around the city during the Soviet offensive of June 1944, Operation Bagration.

Korps-Abteilung D was reformed, once more as the 56th Infantry Division, in East Prussia on 10 September 1944. The Soviet East Prussian Offensive in January 1945 pushed Third Panzer Army west towards Königsberg, and the division was finally encircled and destroyed in the Heiligenbeil pocket, only around 250 men managing to break out westwards to Pomerania (the divisional staff, along with that of 18th Panzergrenadier Division, reformed as the staff of the Ulrich von Hutten Division, which participated in the Battle of Halbe).

== Commanders ==
The following officers commanded the division:

- Major-General Karl Kriebel (15 August 1939)
- Lieutenant-General Paul von Hase (24 July 1940)
- Lieutenant-General Karl von Oven (15 November 1940)
- Major-General Otto-Joachim Lüdecke (24 January 1943)
- Lieutenant-General Vincenz Müller (15 September 1943)
- Major-General Bernhard Pamberg (1 June 1944)
- Major-General Edmund Blaurock (15 July 1944)
