= 359th Infantry Division =

- German: 359. Infanterie-Division
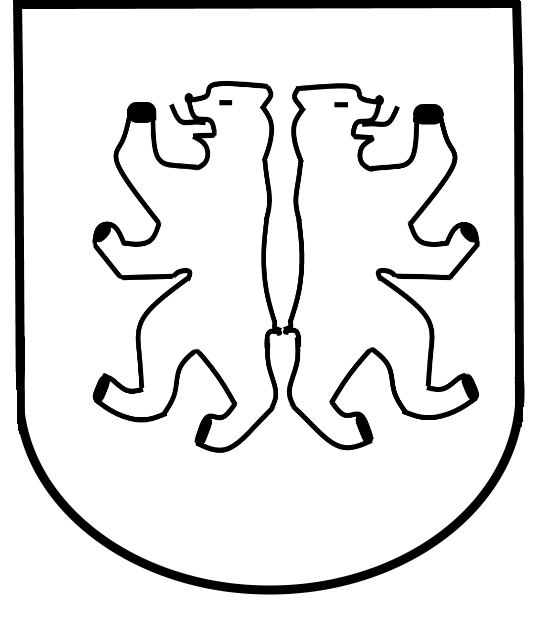
- 359. Infanterie Division Vehicle Insignia
- Country: Nazi Germany
- Branch: Army
- Type: Infantry
- Size: Division
- Engagements: World War II

The 359th Infantry Division (German: 359. Infanterie-Division) was a German infantry division in World War II. It was formed on 11 November 1943 in Radom and surrendered to Soviet forces near Braunau, present-day Broumov in the Czech Republic.

== Commanding officers ==
- Generalleutnant Karl Arndt, 20 November 1943 – 25 April 1945
