= 31st Infantry Division (Wehrmacht) =

- 31. Infanteriedivision; — 31. InfDiv —
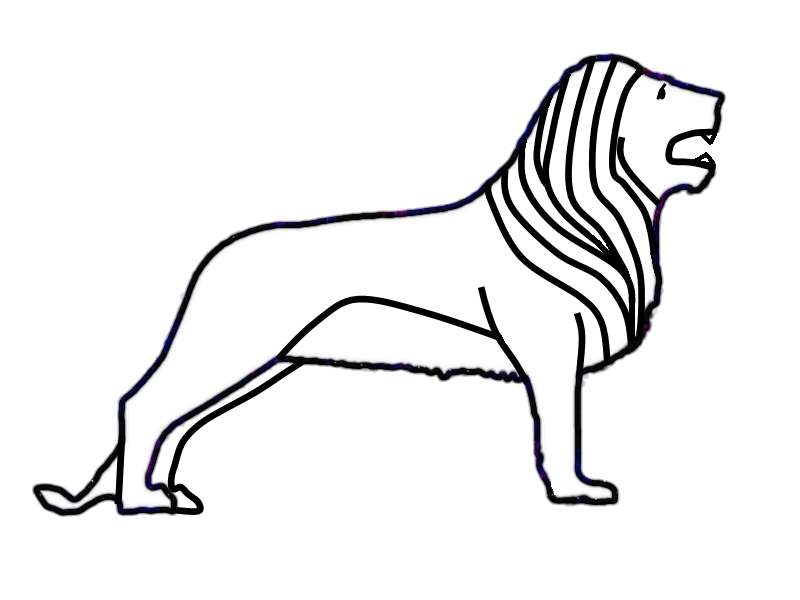
- Unit insignia of the division, the Brunswick Lion
- Active: 1 October 1936 – 8 May 1945
- Disbanded: 18 July 1944 (subsequently re-formed)
- Country: Nazi Germany
- Branch: Army
- Type: Infantry
- Size: Division
- Part of: 2nd Panzer Army, 9th Army, others
- Nickname(s): Lion Division
- Engagements: World War II

Commanders
- Notable commanders: Gerhard Berthold †; Friedrich Hoßbach; Kurt Pflieger; Hermann Flörke; Willifrank Ochsner; Ernst König

The 31st Infantry Division (German: 31. Infanterie-Division) was a German infantry division of the Army during World War II. It participated in the invasion of Poland in 1939 then the invasion of France and the Low Countries in 1940. As part of Panzergruppe 2. of Army Group Centre, it was involved in the invasion of the Soviet Union in June 1941. After hard fighting throughout 1941 and 1942 it joined the 9th Army and fought in the Battle of Kursk in July and August 1943. Along with the rest of the 9th Army, the division conducted a fighting withdrawal for the remainder of 1943, during which it sustained heavy casualties. In the early stages of the Soviet Operation Bagration of June to August 1944, the 31st Infantry Division was destroyed, a fate which subsequently befell most of Army Group Centre. The division was officially disbanded on 18 July 1944.

The division was initially re-formed on 21 July 1944 as the 31st Grenadier Division, but was soon re-designated as the 31st Volksgrenadier Division and returned to the front line in September 1944 as part of Army Group North. Army Group North was subsequently re-designated Army Group Courland in October 1944 when it was cut off from the rest of the German Army on the Courland Peninsula in northwestern Latvia. Army Group Courland remained encircled for the rest of the war, but several divisions, including the 31st Volksgrenadier Division were evacuated by sea to Germany in January 1945. The division joined the newly formed Army Group Vistula and fought in the Danzig area before being captured by the Red Army in May 1945. Twenty-three awards of the Knight's Cross of the Iron Cross were made to members serving with the division, along with two awards of the Oak Leaves to the Knight's Cross. Two of its commanders were killed in action.

== Formation ==
The division was formed on 1 October 1936, recruited from the Braunschweig region in north-central Germany within Wehrkreis XI. It was initially organized with three infantry regiments, each consisting of three battalions. The division's emblem was a standing lion.

== Operations ==
Under the command of Generalleutnant (Major General) Rudolf Kaempfe, the division participated in the invasion of Poland in 1939 as part of the Tenth Army's XVI Motorised Corps, playing a key role in the advance on Warsaw. After a reorganisation it then participated in heavy fighting during the invasion of France and the Low Countries in 1940, as part of XI Corps and the Sixth Army of Army Group B.

In June 1941 it took part in the invasion of the Soviet Union as part of General der Panzertruppe (Lieutenant General) Heinz Guderian's Panzergruppe 2. of Army Group Centre. The 31st Division initially fought in battles for Białystok and Minsk. During the battle for Smolensk which commenced on 17 July 1941, the division was part of Generaloberst (General) Maximilian von Weichs's 2nd Army, as part of the XII Corps.

It was also involved in fighting at Bryansk, and was engaged in the failed attempt to encircle Tula southeast of Moscow (in late 1941). Other bitter fighting fell to the 31st Division in the winter of 1941/42. Generaloberst Walter Model's 9th Army, XLVI Panzer Corps, in the Kursk area in 1943 where it took part in rear-guard skirmishes in the Middle Dnieper area of Ukraine. It was almost completely annihilated to the east of Minsk in June/July 1944. Its commanding officer, Generalleutnant Willifrank Ochsner, was taken prisoner along with most of the remaining troops.

=== 31st (Volks) Grenadier Division ===
The recovering wounded and new recruits were organized into a new 31st Division in Germany in the fall of 1944; initially designated the 31st Grenadier Division, it was later merged with the newly created 550th Grenadier Division to form the 31st Volksgrenadier Division. In September 1944 this division successfully participated in the early battles to defend the Courland Peninsula, (Latvia). In early 1945 the division was evacuated by sea to northern Germany where it fought its last campaigns with Army Group Vistula. In late January 1945 it was part of the garrison defending the East Prussian city of Thorn on the Vistula from the Red Army. After destroying the bridges over the river at Thorn, the division fought its way west and north in an attempt to breakout from Soviet encirclement. When it reached a crossing point about 5 kilometres (3.1 mi) south of Kulm in early February, the ice was melting and the Red Army was closing in. In May 1945 it surrendered to Russian troops on the Hel Peninsula, a 35-km-long sand bar peninsula in Northern Poland that separates the Bay of Puck from the Baltic Sea. Ochsner remained a Soviet prisoner until 1955.

== Organisational history ==
The division was mobilised on 28 August 1939. Its initial composition was:

- 12th Infantry Regiment (I, II, III battalions)
- 17th Infantry Regiment (I, II, III battalions)
- 82nd Infantry Regiment (I, II, III battalions)
- 31st Artillery Regiment (I, II, III battalions)
- 67th Artillery Regiment (I battalion)
- 31st Panzerjäger Battalion
- 31st Reconnaissance Battalion
- 31st Pioneer Battalion
- 31st Signals Battalion
- 31st Division Support Units

In January 1940 the divisional replacement battalion became part of the 181st Infantry Division, and II battalion of the 12th Infantry Regiment (I/12) became part of the 295th Infantry Division and a new battalion was raised to replace it. In October 1940 roughly a third of the division was used as the core of the 131st Infantry Division, but the donated units were replaced. In 1942, II/12, II/17 and III/82 were disbanded and from this point onwards the infantry regiments of the division consisted of only two battalions each. In May 1944, the divisional fusilier battalion was formed from the divisional reconnaissance battalion, and the division absorbed the 566th Grenadier Regiment of the 52nd Field Recruit Division which was being broken up. At this point the division comprised the following major units:

- 12th Grenadier Regiment (I, III battalions)
- 17th Grenadier Regiment (I, III battalions); Oberst Wolfgang Müller, commanding officer 15 Jun 1942 – 30 September 1943
- 82nd Grenadier Regiment (I, II battalions)
- 31st Divisional Fusilier Battalion (anti-aircraft)
- 31st Artillery Regiment (I, II, III battalions)
- 67th Artillery Regiment (I battalion)

In June 1944, the division was destroyed while serving with Army Group Centre, and it was officially disbanded on 18 July 1944.

On 21 July 1944, the 31st Grenadier Division was formed using a combination of the remnants of the 31st Infantry Division and a re-designation of the 550th (Sperr) Division of the 29th Wave. The major units of the division comprised:

- 12th Grenadier Regiment (I, II battalions) (from the 1100th Grenadier Regiment)
- 17th Grenadier Regiment (I, II battalions) (from the 1111th Grenadier Regiment)
- 82nd Grenadier Regiment (I, II battalions) (from the 1112th Grenadier Regiment)
- 31st Divisional Fusilier Battalion (anti-aircraft) (from 550th Divisional Fusilier Company)
- 31st Artillery Regiment (I, II, III battalions) (from 1550th Artillery Regiment)
- 31st Flak Company
- 31st Assault Gun Battalion

On 9 September 1944, the 31st Grenadier Division was re-formed as the 31st Volksgrenadier Division, and some minor re-organisation was affected. The re-organisation was completed in Danzig on 17 January 1945.

== Commanding officers ==
The following officers commanded the division:

- Generalmajor then from 1 January 1938 Generalleutnant Rudolf Kaempfe (1 April 1937 – 22 May 1941)
- Generalmajor Kurt Kalmuekoff (22 May 1941 – 13 August 1941) †
- Generalmajor Gerhard Berthold (15 August 1941 – 21 January 1942)
- Oberst Friedrich Hoßbach (21 January 1942 – 28 February 1942)
- Generalmajor Gerhard Berthold (28 February 1942 – 14 April 1942) †
- Generalmajor then from 1 October 1942 Generalleutnant Kurt Pflieger (16 April 1942 – 1 April 1943)
- Oberst Hermann Flörke (1 April 1943 – 16 May 1943)
- Generalleutnant Friedrich Hoßbach (16 May 1943 – 2 August 1943)
- Oberst Kurt Möhring (2 August 1943 – 25 September 1943)
- Generalmajor then from 1 June 1944 Generalleutnant Willifrank Ochsner (25 September 1943 – late June 1944) (POW)
- Generalmajor Ernst König (late June 1944 – 1 July 1944)

=== 31st Grenadierdivision and 31st Volks-Grenadier-Division ===
- Oberst then from 1 October 1944 Generalmajor Hans-Joachim von Stolzmann (1 July 1944 – January 1945)
- Oberst Wolkewitz (January 1945 - 13 March 1945)
- Oberst Heinrich Kuhberg (March - April 1945)
- Oberst Anton Manold (April - May 1945)
