= Highland Prince Academy de Mexico =

Coordinates: 32.5310°N 117.1179°W

Highland Prince Academy de Mexico, A.C.
- Playas de Tijuana, Baja California; Mexico

Information
- Motto: El Futuro es Hoy
- Established: 1971
- Head teacher: Yael Andrea Hernandez-Mellado
- Colors: Red, Blue and White
- Mascot: Hawks
- Programs (Project Based learning): Sistema Bilingüe, Sistema Highland
- Website: hpa.edu.mx

Colegio Ingles Internacional Highland Prince Academy de Mexico, A.C. is a group of schools located in the borough of Playas de Tijuana, in Tijuana, Mexico. It consists of four schools:

- HPA Jardin de niños
- HPA Primaria
- HPA Secundaria
- HPA Preparatoria

The HPA group is one of the oldest schools of the city of Tijuana, founded in 1971.

== Government ==
Only HPA Junior High & High School have their own Sociedad de Alumnos de HPA Mexico (Spanish for Associated students' union) and Sociedad de Padres de HPA Mexico (Spanish for Associated Parents Body). HPA Kindergarten & Elementary schools have only the Associated Parents body. The school divides its administration into several branches and levels. It is divided in three main branches: School (Principals, teachers, etc.), Students (Sociedad de Alumnos de HPA Mexico), and Parents (Sociedad de Padres de HPA). Proximamente Universidad.

=== School ===
The School branch divides itself into several levels and sublevels:

- Academic: Academic Principal Office, Academic Management Department (Teachers)
- Disciplinary: Prefectura (Disciplinary department)
- Administrative: Administrative Principal Office (all matters related to businesses and finances), Accountant Department (Finances)
- New Soccer Court in the roof.

=== Students ===
The Students branch is organized into the Sociedad de Alumnos de HPA Mexico, which divides itself into several levels:

- Presidency of the Sociedad de Alumnos
- Vicepresidency
- Treasury

=== Parents ===
The Parents branch is somewhat similar to that of the students, but with much larger participation at social events. It has the same structure as the Students branch.
