= Willifrank Ochsner =

Wilhelm-Francis Ochsner
- Born: 31 March 1899
- Died: 5 December 1990 (aged 91)
- Military career
- Allegiance: German Empire; Weimar Republic; Nazi Germany
- Branch: Army
- Service years: 1915–1945
- Rank: Generalleutnant
- Commands: 31st Infantry Division
- Conflicts: World War II Operation Bagration
- Awards: Knight's Cross of the Iron Cross

Wilhelm-Francis Ochsner (31 March 1899 – 5 December 1990) was a German general in the Wehrmacht during World War II who commanded several divisions. He was a recipient of the Knight's Cross of the Iron Cross.

Ochsner surrendered to the Red Army in the summer of 1944 in the course of Soviet Operation Bagration. In 1947 he was sentenced to 25 years imprisonment for war crimes committed against the citizens of the Soviet Union. Ochsner was released in 1955.

== Awards and decorations ==
- Knight's Cross of the Iron Cross on 18 January 1944 as Oberst and commander of 31. Infanterie-Division

Military offices
Preceded by Oberst Kurt Moehring	Commander of 31. Infanterie-Division; 25 September 1943 – June 1944	Succeeded by Oberst Ernst König
