= Petrishchevo =

Petrishchevo Петрищево
- Village
- Location within Vologda Oblast Location within Russia
- Coordinates: 59°19′N 40°52′E
- Country: Russia
- Region: Vologda Oblast
- District: Mezhdurechensky District
- Time zone: UTC+3:00

59°19′N 40°52′E

Petrishchevo (Russian: Петрищево) is a rural locality (a village) in Sukhonskoye Rural Settlement, Mezhdurechensky District, Vologda Oblast, Russia. The population was 10 as of 2002.

== Geography ==
Petrishchevo is located 15 km southwest of Shuyskoye (the district's administrative centre) by road. Vakhrushevo is the nearest rural locality.
