= List of Knight's Cross of the Iron Cross recipients (Ba–Bm) =

The Knight's Cross of the Iron Cross (German: Ritterkreuz des Eisernen Kreuzes) and its variants were the highest awards in the military of Nazi Germany during World War II. The Knight's Cross of the Iron Cross was awarded for a wide range of reasons and across all ranks, from a senior commander for skilled leadership of his troops in battle to a low-ranking soldier for a single act of extreme gallantry. Presentations were made to members of the three military branches of the Wehrmacht—the Heer (Army), Kriegsmarine (Navy) and Luftwaffe (Air Force)—as well as the Waffen-SS, the Reichsarbeitsdienst (RAD—Reich Labour Service) and the Volkssturm (German national militia). There were also 43 recipients in the military forces of allies of Nazi Germany.

There is currently no official German Government list of KC recipients. Analysis and acceptance of the order commission of the Association of Knight's Cross Recipients (AKCR) indicates that up to 7,321 awards may have been made between its first presentation on 30 September 1939 and its last bestowal on 17 June 1945. (Note: Großadmiral and President of Germany Karl Dönitz, Hitler's successor as Head of State (Staatsoberhaupt) and Supreme Commander of the Armed Forces, had ordered the cessation of all promotions and awards as of 11 May 1945 (Dönitz-decree). Consequently the last Knight's Cross awarded to Oberleutnant zur See of the Reserves Georg-Wolfgang Feller on 17 June 1945 must therefore be considered a de facto but not de jure presentation.) These recipients are listed in the 1986 edition of Walther-Peer Fellgiebel's book, Die Träger des Ritterkreuzes des Eisernen Kreuzes 1939–1945 [The Bearers of the Knight's Cross of the Iron Cross 1939–1945]. Fellgiebel was a recipient of the Knight's Cross of the Iron Cross, and was also the former chairman and head of the order commission of the AKCR. In 1996, a second edition of this book was published with an addendum delisting 11 of the recipients.

In 2007, Veit Scherzer published his Die Ritterkreuzträger 1939–1945 [The Knight's Cross Bearers 1939–1945]. Scherzer's book was compiled from documents held by the German Federal Archives, and cast doubt on 193 of the listings in Fellgiebel's 1996 book. The majority of the disputed recipients were listed as having received the award in 1945, when the deteriorating situation of the Third Reich during the final days of World War II left a number of nominations incomplete and pending in various stages of the approval process.

Listed here are the 368 Knight's Cross recipients of the Wehrmacht and Waffen-SS whose last name is in the range "Ba–Bm". Scherzer has challenged the validity of 13 of these listings. This is the first of two lists of all 725 Knight's Cross of the Iron Cross recipients whose last name starts with "B". The recipients whose last name is in the range "Bn–Bz" are listed at List of Knight's Cross of the Iron Cross recipients (Bn–Bz).

== Background ==
The Knight's Cross of the Iron Cross and its higher grades were based on four separate enactments. The first enactment, Reichsgesetzblatt I S. 1573 of 1 September 1939 instituted the Iron Cross (Eisernes Kreuz), the Knight's Cross of the Iron Cross and the Grand Cross of the Iron Cross (Großkreuz des Eisernen Kreuzes). Article 2 of the enactment mandated that the award of a higher class be preceded by the award of all preceding classes. As the war progressed, some of the recipients of the Knight's Cross distinguished themselves further and a higher grade, the Knight's Cross of the Iron Cross with Oak Leaves (Ritterkreuz des Eisernen Kreuzes mit Eichenlaub), was instituted. The Oak Leaves, as they were commonly referred to, were based on the enactment Reichsgesetzblatt I S. 849 of 3 June 1940. In 1941, two higher grades of the Knight's Cross were instituted. The enactment Reichsgesetzblatt I S. 613 of 28 September 1941 introduced the Knight's Cross of the Iron Cross with Oak Leaves and Swords (Ritterkreuz des Eisernen Kreuzes mit Eichenlaub und Schwertern) and the Knight's Cross of the Iron Cross with Oak Leaves, Swords and Diamonds (Ritterkreuz des Eisernen Kreuzes mit Eichenlaub, Schwertern und Brillanten). At the end of 1944 the final grade, the Knight's Cross of the Iron Cross with Golden Oak Leaves, Swords, and Diamonds (Ritterkreuz des Eisernen Kreuzes mit goldenem Eichenlaub, Schwertern und Brillanten), based on the enactment Reichsgesetzblatt 1945 I S. 11 of 29 December 1944, became the final variant of the Knight's Cross authorized.

== Recipients ==
Knight's Cross of the Iron Cross (Ba–Bm)
Service	Number of presentations	Posthumous presentations
Heer	232	9
Kriegsmarine	15	0
Luftwaffe	100	9
Waffen-SS	21	1

The Oberkommando der Wehrmacht (Supreme Command of the Armed Forces) kept separate Knight's Cross lists, one for each of the three military branches, Heer (Army), Kriegsmarine (Navy), Luftwaffe (Air Force) and for the Waffen-SS. Within each of these lists a unique sequential number was assigned to each recipient. The same numbering paradigm was applied to the higher grades of the Knight's Cross, one list per grade. Of the 368 awards made to servicemen whose last name is in the range "Ba–Bm", 31 were later awarded the Knight's Cross of the Iron Cross with Oak Leaves, 12 the Knight's Cross of the Iron Cross with Oak Leaves and Swords and one the Knight's Cross of the Iron Cross with Oak Leaves, Swords and Diamonds; 19 presentations were made posthumously. Heer members received 232 of the medals; 15 went to the Kriegsmarine, 100 to the Luftwaffe, and 21 to the Waffen-SS. The sequential numbers greater than 843 for the Knight's Cross of the Iron Cross with Oak Leaves and 143 for the Knight's Cross of the Iron Cross with Oak Leaves and Swords are unofficial and were assigned by the Association of Knight's Cross Recipients (AKCR) and are therefore denoted in parentheses. The recipients are initially ordered alphabetically by last name. The rank listed is the recipient's rank at the time the Knight's Cross was awarded.

This along with the + (plus) indicates that a higher grade of Knight's Cross was awarded as well.
This along with the * (asterisk) indicates that the Knight's Cross was awarded posthumously.
This along with the ? (question mark) indicates that historian Veit Scherzer has expressed doubt regarding the veracity and formal correctness of the listing.

Name	Service	Rank	Role and unit (Note: For an explanation of the various naming schemes used by the Luftwaffe, Heer, Kriegsmarine and Waffen-SS refer to nomenclature used by the Wehrmacht and Waffen-SS.)	Date of award	Notes	Image
Karl Baacke+	Heer	Hauptmann	Chief of the 2./Infanterie-Regiment 124	30 June 1941	Awarded 352nd Oak Leaves 10 December 1943	—
Ernst-Günther Baade+	Heer	Oberst	Commander of Schützen-Regiment 115	27 June 1942	Awarded 402nd Oak Leaves 22 February 1944; 111th Swords 16 November 1944	A man wearing a military uniform, peaked cap, and an Iron Cross displayed at the front of his uniform collar.
Heinz Baader	Luftwaffe	Hauptmann	In the Nahaufklärungs-Gruppe 5	26 April 1945	—	—
Sophus Baagoe	Luftwaffe	Oberleutnant	Pilot in the 5./Zerstörergeschwader 26 "Horst Wessel"	14 June 1941*	Killed in action 14 May 1941	—
Werner Baake	Luftwaffe	Oberleutnant	Staffelkapitän of the 3./Nachtjagdgeschwader 1 (Note: As Staffelkapitän of the 2./Nachtjagdgeschwader 1 (Scherzer))	27 July 1944	—	—
Johannes Baasch	Heer	Oberleutnant of the Reserves	Chief of the 9./Infanterie-Regiment 410	3 May 1942	—	—
Hans Baasner	Luftwaffe	Oberleutnant	Pilot and observer in the 3./Fernaufklärungs-Gruppe 121 (Note: On 14 March 1943 as a pilot and observer in the Aufklärungsstaffel 3.(F)/121 (Scherzer))	11 March 1943	—	—
Wilhelm Bach	Heer	Hauptmann of the Reserves	Commander of the I./Schützen-Regiment 104	9 July 1941	—	—
Erich von dem Bach-Zelewski	Waffen-SS	SS-Obergruppenführer and General of the Police	Commanding general of the Korpsgruppe "von dem Bach" in Warsaw (Note: As commanding general of the Korpsgruppe "von dem Bach" (Scherzer))	30 September 1944	—	A man wearing a military uniform, glasses and neck order, in the shape of a cross. He has short hair that is combed back and a determined facial expression.
Erich Bachem	Heer	Leutnant	Vorgeschobener Beobachter (artillery observer) in the IV./Artillerie-Regiment 262	6 January 1942	—	—
Rudolf Bacherer+	Heer	Oberst of the Reserves	Commander of Grenadier-Regiment 234	30 October 1943	Awarded 550th Oak Leaves 11 August 1944	—
[Dr.] Friedrich Bachmaier (Note: The brackets around the doctor title [Dr.] denotes that the academic title was attained after the Knight's Cross of the Iron Cross was awarded.)	Heer	Hauptmann of the Reserves	Commander of the III./Gebirgsjäger-Regiment 100	9 January 1945	—	—
Ludwig Bachmaier	Heer	Hauptmann of the Reserves	Leader of the I./Infanterie-Regiment 179	26 December 1941	—	—
Christian Bachmann	Waffen-SS	SS-Hauptsturmführer	Leader of the II./SS-Panzergrenadier-Regiment 5 "Totenkopf" (Note: As leader of the II./SS-Panzergrenadier-Regiment 5 (Scherzer))	28 February 1945	—	—
Erwin Bachmann	Waffen-SS	SS-Obersturmführer (Note: As SS-Obersturmführer of the Reserves (Scherzer))	Adjutant of the I./SS-Panzer-Regiment 10 "Frundsberg"	10 February 1945	—	—
Fritz Bachmann	Heer	Obergefreiter	In the 1./Panzergrenadier-Regiment 7	5 April 1945	—	—
Josef Bachmeier	Waffen-SS	SS-Hauptsturmführer	Leader of the II./Freiwilligen-SS-Panzergrenadier-Regiment 23 "Norge" (Note: As leader of the II./SS-Panzergrenadier-Regiment 23 "Norge" (Norwegian Nr. 1) (Scherzer))	23 August 1944	—	—
Herbert Bachnick	Luftwaffe	Fahnenjunker-Feldwebel	Pilot in the 9./Jagdgeschwader 52	27 July 1944	—	—
Willy Bachor? (Note: Willy Bachor's nomination by his unit was not forwarded or may have been lost by the corps due to the military situation. A second nomination was submitted after the evacuation of East Prussia, after the German capitulation. This nomination was not processed. The order commission of the Association of Knight's Cross Recipients (AKCR) processed the case in 1982 and decided: "Knight's Cross yes, 8 May 1945". The presentation date was later changed by Walther-Peer Fellgiebel. Bachor was a member of the AKCR.)	Heer	Oberwachtmeister	Zugführer (platoon leader) in the 12./Panzer-Regiment 24	11 May 1945	—	—
Hans-Ulrich Back	Heer	Oberstleutnant	Commander of the I./Schützen-Regiment 2	5 August 1940	—	—
Fritz Backhauss	Heer	Hauptmann	Commander of the III./Gebirgsjäger-Regiment 13	8 February 1944	—	—
Kurt Bade	Heer	Unteroffizier	Zugführer (platoon leader) in the 4./Panzer-Auklärungs-Abteilung 23	26 August 1943	—	—
Edwin Bader	Luftwaffe	Oberleutnant	Observer in the 2./Nahaufklärungs-Gruppe 16	26 March 1944	—	—
Friedrich Bader	Heer	Major	Commander of Hochgebirgs-Jäger-Bataillon 3	12 August 1944	—	—
Josef Bader	Heer	Hauptmann	Commander of the II./Grenadier-Regiment 95	23 August 1943	—	—
Curt Badinski	Heer	Oberst	Commander of Infanterie-Regiment 489	11 October 1941	—	—
Emil Badorrek+	Luftwaffe	Hauptmann	Staffelkapitän of the 4./Fernaufklärungs-Gruppe 11 (Note: As Staffelkapitän of the Aufklärungsstaffel 4.(F)/11 (Scherzer))	22 November 1943	Awarded 652nd Oak Leaves 18 November 1944	—
Johann Badum	Luftwaffe	Leutnant	Pilot in the 6./Jagdgeschwader 77	15 October 1942	—	
Alfred Badzong	Heer	Gefreiter	Machine gunner in the 1./Grenadier-Regiment 273	5 February 1945	—	—
Rudolf Bäcker	Heer	Sanitäts-Feldwebel	In the Stab of the II./Grenadier-Regiment 36	18 September 1943	—	—
Wilhelm Bäder	Heer	Oberleutnant of the Reserves	Chief of the 8./Grenadier-Regiment 958	14 April 1945*	Killed in action 22 March 1945	—
Dr. med. dent. Franz Bäke+	Heer	Major of the Reserves	Commander of the II./Panzer-Regiment 11	11 January 1943	Awarded 262nd Oak Leaves 1 August 1943; 49th Swords 21 February 1944	A black-and-white photograph of a man wearing a dark military uniform with a neck order in shape of an Iron Cross.
Bern von Baer+	Heer	Oberstleutnant im Generalstab (in the General Staff)	Ia (operations officer) of the 16. Panzer-Division	13 January 1944	Awarded 761st Oak Leaves 28 February 1945	A man wearing a military uniform and field cap with an Iron Cross displayed at the front of his uniform collar.
Heinrich (Heinz) Bär+	Luftwaffe	Leutnant (Note: As Leutnant of the Reserves (Scherzer))	Pilot in the 1./Jagdgeschwader 51	2 July 1941	Awarded 31st Oak Leaves 14 August 1941; 7th Swords 16 February 1942	
Erich Bärenfänger+	Heer	Oberleutnant	Leader of the III./Infanterie-Regiment 123	7 August 1942	Awarded 243rd Oak Leaves 17 May 1943; 45th Swords 23 January 1944	—
Hansgeorg Bätcher+	Luftwaffe	Hauptmann	Staffelkapitän of the 1./Kampfgeschwader 100	21 December 1942	Awarded 434th Oak Leaves 24 March 1944	—
Niels Bätge	Kriegsmarine	Kapitänleutnant	Chief of the 4. Schnellbootflottille	4 January 1942	—	—
Johann Bäuchl (Note: According to Scherzer the recipient's name was Johann Baichl.)	Heer	Oberfeldwebel	Zugführer (platoon leader) in the 5./Panzergrenadier-Regiment 33	23 October 1944	—	—
Emil Bäuerle	Heer	Oberleutnant of the Reserves	Chief of the 8./Jäger-Regiment 56	4 May 1944	—	—
Gottfried Bäumler	Heer	Unteroffizier	Zugführer (platoon leader) in the 11./Grenadier-Regiment 41 (motorized)	14 May 1944	—	—
Heinz Bäumler	Heer	Oberleutnant	Leader of the 6./Artillerie-Regiment 17	11 June 1944	—	—
Kurt Bahns	Heer	Oberleutnant	Chief of the 6./Infanterie-Regiment 216 (Note: As chief of the 6./Infanterie-Regiment 246 of the 88. Infanterie-Division (Thomas and Wegmann))	13 November 1942	—	—
Artur Bahr	Heer	Oberleutnant	Chief of the 7./Grenadier-Regiment 44	3 December 1944*	Died of wounds 28 November 1944	—
Günther Bahr	Luftwaffe	Oberfeldwebel	Pilot in the I./Nachtjagdgeschwader 6	28 March 1945	—	—
Joseph Baier? (Note: Joseph Baier's nomination by his unit was received by 1st squadron of P5 (Order, decorations and awards department of the Army Staff Office) via the field commando unit of Reichsführer-SS, because the division was a Volksgrenadier-Division, on 4 March 1945. Heinrich Himmler had approved the nomination. On 5 March, Major Joachim Domaschk contacted the 9th Volksgrenadier-Division by teleprinter message because all the intermittent approvals were missing. He reached out to the 7th Army, requesting the 2nd and 3rd version of the nomination via the command chain. The division was annihilated shortly after this date in the vicinity of Lauterecken. The remains of the division retreated together with the 1st Army to the area south of Rothenburg ob der Tauber. The 9th Volksgrenadier-Division was already disbanded when Domaschk reminded the 1st Army again on 29 April: "The Knight's Cross nomination for Joseph Baier is to be expedited." A presentation was never made. A file card for an approved or rejected presentation was not created. According to the Association of Knight's Cross Recipients (AKCR) the award was presented in accordance with the Dönitz-decree. This is illegal according to the Deutsche Dienststelle (WASt) and lacks legal justification. The presentation date was assigned by Walther-Peer Fellgiebel.)	Heer	Oberstleutnant	Commander of Grenadier-Regiment 36	9 May 1945	—	—
Karl Baier	Heer	Hauptmann of the Reserves	Commander of the II./Grenadier-Regiment 1036	16 October 1944	—	—
Hans Baindner	Heer	Gefreiter	Machine gunner in the 11./Jäger-Regiment 228	24 June 1944	—	—
Kurt Bajorat	Heer	Obergefreiter	Group leader in the 3./Panzergrenadier-Regiment 13	15 May 1944	—	—
Hermann Balck+	Heer	Oberstleutnant	Commander of Schützen-Regiment 1	3 June 1940	Awarded 155th Oak Leaves 20 December 1942; 25th Swords 4 March 1943; 19th Diamonds 31 August 1944	The head and shoulders of a man, shown from the side. He wears a black military uniform and cap, and an Iron Cross displayed at the front of his dark uniform collar.
Horst Baldauf	Luftwaffe	Leutnant	Observer in the 2./Fernaufklärungs-Gruppe 22 (Note: As an observer in the Aufklärungsstaffel 2.(F)/22 (Scherzer))	8 August 1944	—	—
Johann Baldauf	Heer	Feldwebel	Zugführer (platoon leader) in the 3./Gebirgs-Pionier-Bataillon 91	18 November 1944	—	—
Josef Baldes? (Note: Josef Baldes's nomination by his unit was processed by the Oberkommando der Luftwaffe/Auszeichnung und Disziplin (OKL/AuD—Air Force High Command/Award and Discipline) on 16 April 1945. This nomination, now recommending approval, was forwarded on 17 April with a Luftwaffenpersonalamt-Verleihungsvorschlag (LPA-VV—Air Force Staff Office Nomination Recommendation) Nr. 1577 to the adjutancy of Hermann Göring. The nomination was never finalized and was left unfinished by the end of the war. A presentation of the Knight's Cross of the Iron Cross cannot be verified. The presentation date was assigned by Walther-Peer Fellgiebel.)	Luftwaffe	Fahnenjunker-Oberfeldwebel	Pilot in the 1.(F)/Aufklärungs-Gruppe 124 (Note: On 8 May 1945 as pilot in the Aufklärungsstaffel 1.(F)/124 (Scherzer))	9 May 1945	—	—
Gerhard Ball	Heer	Hauptmann	Leader of Aufklärungs-Abteilung 53 (motorized)	23 November 1941*	Killed in action 9 October 1941	—
Otto Edler von Ballasko	Luftwaffe	Oberleutnant	Staffelkapitän of the 9./Kampfgeschwader 1 "Hindenburg"	13 August 1942	—	A man wearing a military uniform with an Iron Cross displayed at the front of his uniform collar.
Wilhelm Balthasar+	Luftwaffe	Hauptmann	Staffelkapitän of the 7./Jagdgeschwader 27 (Note: As Staffelkapitän of the 1./Jagdgeschwader 1 (Scherzer))	14 June 1940	Awarded 17th Oak Leaves 2 July 1941	
Udo Balzer	Heer	Major	Commander of Füsilier-Bataillon "Deba" (Note: As commander of Füsilier-Bataillon "Deba" [commander Fester Platz Tarnopol] (Scherzer))	9 April 1944	—	—
Friedrich Banach	Heer	Feldwebel	Zugführer (platoon leader) of the 4./Panzer-Regiment 36	30 November 1942	—	—
Helmut Banaski	Heer	Leutnant of the Reserves	Zugführer (platoon leader) in the Stabskompanie/Grenadier-Regiment 1077	18 February 1945	—	—
Alfred Banholzer	Luftwaffe	Hauptmann	Staffelkapitän of the 1./Kampfgeschwader 55	14 January 1945	—	—
Erich Bansen	Heer	Oberfeldwebel	Zugführer (platoon leader) in the 1./schwere Panzer-Jagd-Abteilung 519	15 March 1944	—	—
Karl-Heinrich Banze	Heer	Oberwachtmeister	Zugführer (platoon leader) in the 1./Sturmgeschütz-Abteilung 244	27 May 1942	—	—
Benno Barall	Heer	Hauptmann of the Reserves	Commander of Panzer-Jäger-Abteilung 227	21 September 1944	—	—
Ewald Baranek	Heer	Oberleutnant	Leader of Panzer-Pionier-Bataillon 58	12 February 1943	—	—
Hans-Levin von Barby	Heer	Oberstleutnant	Commander of Schützen-Regiment 361 and leader of a Kampfgruppe (Note: As commander of the re-inforced Afrika-Regiment 361 (Scherzer))	13 December 1941	—	—
Konrad Barde	Heer	Oberst	Commander of Artillerie-Regiment 104	5 January 1943	—	—
Johannes Barge? (Note: Unlawful presentation of the Knight's Cross of the Iron Cross to Johannes Barge by the Dönitz Government after 8 May 1945. This can be verified by the radio communication dated on 21 May 1945. The presentation date was backdated by Walther-Peer Fellgiebel. Barge was a member of the Association of Knight's Cross Recipients.)	Heer	Oberst	Commander of Festungs-Grenadier-Regiment Kreta	10 May 1945	—	—
Hans von Bargen	Luftwaffe	Oberleutnant	Adjutant and technical officer of the I./Sturzkampfgeschwader 3	19 September 1942	—	—
Klaus Bargsten	Kriegsmarine	Kapitänleutnant	Commander of U-521	30 April 1943	—	
Gerhard Barkhorn+	Luftwaffe	Oberleutnant	Staffelkapitän of the 4./Jagdgeschwader 52	23 August 1942	Awarded 175th Oak Leaves 11 January 1943; 52nd Swords 2 March 1944	
Ernst Barkmann	Waffen-SS	SS-Unterscharführer	Panzer commander in the 4./SS-Panzer-Regiment 2 "Das Reich" (Note: As panzer commander in the 4./SS-Panzer-Regiment 2 (Scherzer))	27 August 1944	—	—
Josef Barmetler	Luftwaffe	Oberleutnant of the Reserves (Note: As Oberleutnant (war officer) and chief of the 7./Fallschirmjäger-Sturm-Regiment 1 (Scherzer))	Leader of the 7./Fallschirmjäger-Sturm-Regiment	9 July 1941	Died of wounds 20 February 1945	A man wearing a military uniform, peaked cap, and an Iron Cross displayed at the front of his uniform collar.
Hermann Barnbeck	Heer	Oberst	Commander of Infanterie-Regiment 211	29 October 1942	—	—
Ewald Bartel	Heer	Hauptmann of the Reserves	Commander of Panzergrenadier-Bataillon 106 "Feldherrnhalle" (Note: As commander of Panzergrenadier-Bataillon "Feldherrnhalle" (106) [=Panzergrenadier-Bataillon 2106 in the Panzer-Brigade 106] (Scherzer))	31 December 1944	—	—
Hans Bartels	Kriegsmarine	Kapitänleutnant	Commander of Minensucher M-1	16 May 1940	—	A man wearing a military uniform, peaked cap, and an Iron Cross displayed at the front of his uniform collar.
Hans-Werner Bartels	Heer	Hauptmann of the Reserves	Leader of the I./Grenadier-Regiment 399	26 January 1944	—	—
Heinrich Bartels	Luftwaffe	Unteroffizier	Pilot in the 8./Jagdgeschwader 5	13 November 1942	—	—
Herbert Bartels	Luftwaffe	Oberleutnant	Leader of the 3./Flak-Regiment 293 (motorized) (Note: As leader of the 3./schwere Flak-Regiment 293 (deployable) (Scherzer))	22 November 1943	—	—
Franz Barten	Luftwaffe	Oberleutnant	Staffelkapitän of the 9./Jagdgeschwader 53 (Note: On 24 October 1944 as Staffelkapitän in the III./Jagdgeschwader 53 (Scherzer))	29 October 1944*	Killed in action 4 August 1944	—
Eitel-Albert Barth	Luftwaffe	Oberleutnant	Staffelführer of the 4./Kampfgeschwader 55	24 March 1943	—	
Joachim Barth	Heer	Hauptmann	Commander of the Panzer-Jäger-Abteilung 13	17 December 1942	—	—
Karl Barth	Luftwaffe	Oberleutnant (Note: As Oberleutnant of the Reserves (Scherzer))	Pilot in the 3./Küstenflieger-Gruppe 506	14 December 1940	—	—
Ludwig Barth	Heer	Stabsfeldwebel	Zugführer (platoon leader) in the 14.(Panzerjäger)/Infanterie-Regiment 14 (Note: As Zugführer (platoon leader) in the 14./Infanterie-Regiment 14 (Scherzer))	20 August 1942	—	—
Otto Barth	Heer	Oberst	Commander of Artillerie-Regiment 117	8 May 1943	—	—
Otto Barth	Heer	Major (Note: As Major of the Reserves (Scherzer))	Commander of the II./Grenadier-Regiment 688	9 February 1945	—	—
Siegfried Barth	Luftwaffe	Hauptmann	Staffelkapitän of the 4./Kampfgeschwader 51	2 October 1942	—	—
Hans Barthle	Heer	Oberleutnant of the Reserves	Chief of the 7./Grenadier-Regiment 119 (motorized)	19 December 1943	—	—
Karl-Ludwig Barths	Heer	Hauptmann	Leader of the Heeres-Sturmgeschütz-Brigade 393 (Note: As leader of the Sturmgeschütz-Brigade 393 (Scherzer))	14 January 1945	—	—
Hans Bartkowiak	Heer	Leutnant	Pioneer Zugführer (platoon leader) in the Stabskompnie/Grenadier-Regiment 30 (motorized)	25 October 1943	—	—
Leopold Bartl	Heer	Major	Commander of Pionier-Bataillon 335	6 November 1943	—	—
Günter Bartsch	Heer	Unteroffizier	Group leader in the 2./Panzergrenadier-Regiment 110	12 November 1943	—	—
Herbert Barz	Heer	Unteroffizier	Richtschütze (gunner) in the 3./schwere Panzer-Jäger-Abteilung 519	18 July 1944	—	—
Hans-Dieter von Basse	Heer	Major	Commander of the I./Panzer-Füsilier-Regiment "Großdeutschland"	10 September 1944	—	—
Werner Graf von Bassewitz-Levetzow	Heer	Oberst of the Reserves	Commander of Grenadier-Regiment 96	17 September 1944	—	—
Heinrich Bastian? (Note: No evidence of the award can be found in the German Federal Archives. The award was unlawfully presented by SS-Oberstgruppenführer Sepp Dietrich. The date is taken from the announcement made by the 6. SS-Panzerarmee. Bastian was a member of the Association of Knight's Cross Recipients (AKCR).)	Waffen-SS	SS-Obersturmführer	Leader of the II./SS-Panzergrenadier-Regiment 3 "Deutschland"	6 May 1945	—	—
Helmut Bastian	Kriegsmarine	Kapitänleutnant	Leader of a Sprengbootflottille (Kleinkampfverband) (Note: As chief of the Kleinkampfflottille 211 (Scherzer))	3 November 1944	—	—
Karl Bastian	Waffen-SS	SS-Hauptsturmführer	Leader of the II./SS-Panzergrenadier-Regiment 21	23 August 1944*	Killed in action 11 August 1944	—
Wilhelm Batz+	Luftwaffe	Oberleutnant	Staffelkapitän of the 5./Jagdgeschwader 52	26 March 1944	Awarded 526th Oak Leaves 20 July 1944 (145th) Swords 21 April 1945	
Erhard Bauer	Heer	Gefreiter	Squad leader in the 1./Pionier-Bataillon 102	4 October 1944	—	—
Ernst Bauer	Kriegsmarine	Kapitänleutnant	Commander of U-126	16 March 1942	—	—
Friedrich Bauer	Heer	Hauptmann	Leader of the I./Panzer-Regiment 33	13 September 1943*	Killed in action 10 July 1943	—
Gerhard Bauer	Luftwaffe	Oberfeldwebel	Pilot in the 8./Sturzkampfgeschwader 77	29 February 1944	—	—
Hans Bauer	Waffen-SS	SS-Obersturmführer	Leader of the 3./SS-Panzergrenadier-Bataillon 506	5 April 1945	—	—
Dr. jur. Heinz Bauer	Heer	Oberleutnant of the Reserves	Regiment adjutant of the Grenadier-Regiment 585 (Note: As adjutant of the Grenadier-Regiment 585 (Scherzer))	12 June 1944	—	—
Helmut Bauer	Waffen-SS	SS-Oberscharführer	Zugführer (platoon leader) in the 3./SS-Panzer-Regiment 5 "Wiking" (Note: As Zugführer (platoon leader) in the 3./SS-Panzer-Regiment 5 (Scherzer))	12 September 1943	—	—
Herbert Bauer+	Luftwaffe	Oberleutnant	Staffelkapitän of the 3./Sturzkampfgeschwader 2 "Immelmann"	31 December 1943	Awarded 618th Oak Leaves 30 September 1944	—
Hermann Bauer	Heer	Hauptmann	Commander of Grenadier-Bataillon Belgard in the Festung (fortress) Schneidemühl	14 February 1945	—	—
Joachim Bauer	Luftwaffe	Oberst im Generalstab (in the General Staff)	Fliegerführer of Luftflottenkommando 4	14 May 1944	—	—
Johann Bauer	Heer	Oberjäger	Group leader in the 6./Gebirgsjäger-Regiment 99	27 June 1942	—	—
Konrad Bauer	Luftwaffe	Feldwebel	Pilot in the 5./Jagdgeschwader 300	31 October 1944	—	
Ludwig Bauer	Heer	Unteroffizier	Group leader in the 5./Grenadier-Regiment 117	23 October 1944	—	—
Ludwig Bauer? (Note: No evidence of the award can be found in the German Federal Archives. Von Seeman stated that the tradition club of the 9. Panzer-Division informed him of the presentation of the Knight's Cross to Ludwig Bauer in 1954. The I./Panzer-Regiment 33, to which the 1st company was subordinated, was destroyed on 17 April 1945 under the leadership of Hauptmann Simon in the Ruhr Pocket (Heeresgruppe B). The receipt of a nomination by his unit with the Heerespersonalamt (HPA—Army Staff Office) or the Außenstelle of the Heerespersonalamt (HPA/A—Branch of the Army Staff Office) cannot be verified. A Heerespersonalamt-Verleihungsvorschlag (HPA-VV— Army Staff Office Nomination Recommendation) was definitely not created. Also, the responsible official at the time would have deferred the nomination from Heeresgruppe B after its capitulation after 17 April according to AHA 44 Ziff. 572. A presentation on 29 April via the HPA or the HPA/A is very unlikely. A statement provided by the first scribe of the 9. Panzer-Division from 1957 to the Association of Knight's Cross Recipients (AKCR) is inconclusive, stating: "...I have to assume that this Knight's Cross was intended for ... Leutnant ... Bauer". Bauer is a member of the AKCR.)	Heer	Leutnant	Leader of the I./Panzer-Regiment 33 (Note: As leader of the 1./Panzer-Regiment 33 (Scherzer))	29 April 1945	—	—
Michael Bauer	Heer	Major	Commander of the I./Infanterie-Regiment 499	2 February 1942	—	—
Oskar Bauer	Luftwaffe	Major	Commander of the II./Flak-Regiment 4	22 October 1941	—	A man wearing a military uniform, peaked cap, and an Iron Cross displayed at the front of his uniform collar.
Robert Bauer	Heer	Major	Leader of a Kampfgruppe in the 15. Infanterie-Division	11 March 1945	—	—
Viktor Bauer+	Luftwaffe	Oberleutnant	Staffelkapitän of the 9./Jagdgeschwader 3 (Note: As Oberleutnant and pilot in the III./Jagdgeschwader 3 (Scherzer))	30 July 1941	Awarded 107th Oak Leaves 26 July 1942	
Gerhard Bauhaus	Luftwaffe	Hauptmann of the Reserves (Note: As Hauptmann (Scherzer))	Staffelkapitän of the 8./Sturzkampfgeschwader 77	25 May 1942	—	—
Dr. Adolf Baum	Luftwaffe	Oberleutnant	Battery leader in the Flak-Regiment 37 (motorized) (Note: As chief of the 5./Flak-Regiment (motorized) 37 (Scherzer))	21 December 1942*	Killed in action 4 December 1942	—
Adolf Baum	Heer	Oberfeldwebel	Zugführer (platoon leader) in the 1./Divisions-Füsilier-Bataillon 197	26 March 1944	—	—
Otto Baum+	Waffen-SS	SS-Sturmbannführer	Commander of the III./SS-"Totenkopf"-Infanterie-Regiment 3	8 May 1942	Awarded 277th Oak Leaves 22 August 1943; 95th Swords 2 September 1944	—
Paul Baumann	Heer	Oberfeldwebel	Zugführer (platoon leader) in the Radfahr-Kompanie/Grenadier-Regiment 422 (Note: As Zugführer (platoon leader) in the 2./Grenadier-Regiment 422 (Scherzer))	1 September 1943	—	—
Willi Baumann	Waffen-SS	SS-Sturmbannführer	Quartiermeister (quartermaster general) of the XI. SS-Armeekorps and leader of a Kampfgruppe	27 January 1945	—	—
Werner Baumbach+	Luftwaffe	Leutnant	Pilot in the 5./Kampfgeschwader 30	8 May 1940	Awarded 20th Oak Leaves 14 July 1941; 16th Swords 17 August 1942 (Note: 16th Swords on 16 August 1942 (Scherzer))	A smiling man wearing a military uniform, and an Iron Cross displayed at the front of his uniform collar.
Werner Baumgarten-Crusius+	Heer	Oberleutnant	Chief of the 5./Infanterie-Regiment 156 (motorized)	22 February 1942	Awarded 199th Oak Leaves 27 February 1943	—
Erich Baumgartl	Luftwaffe	Oberleutnant	Staffelkapitän of the 3./Kampfgeschwader 55	31 July 1943	—	—
Gregor Baunach	Heer	Major	Commander of the I./Grenadier-Regiment 173	5 September 1944	—	—
Eugen Baur	Heer	Major	Leader of Infanterie-Regiment 470	2 February 1942	—	—
Heinz Baurmann? (Note: No evidence regarding the presentation of the Knight's Cross of the Iron Cross to Heinz Baurmann can be found in the German Federal Archives. According to Walther-Peer Fellgiebel the presentation was made by Feldmarschall Ferdinand Schörner in compliance with the empowerment for autonomous presentations dated 3 May 1945. Authors Thomas and Wegmann mention a teleprinter message from Schörner dated 4 May 1945, which presumably verifies the claim. However, Thomas and Wegmann fail to present a reference nor do they publish the message itself. Veit Scherzer was denied access to files, which could help clarify the case, of the Association of Knight's Cross Recipients (AKCR) on the grounds of the Bundesarchivgesetz (German Archive Law). Baurmann was a member of the AKCR.)	Heer	Hauptmann	Commander of Sturmgeschütz-Brigade 300 (Feld)	4 May 1945	—	—
Dr. jur. Albert Bausch	Heer	Hauptmann of the Reserves	Commander of Sturmgeschütz-Abteilung 286	10 February 1944	—	—
Friedrich Bausch	Luftwaffe	Leutnant	Company leader in the 3./Fallschirm-Pionier-Bataillon 5 (Note: As leader in the 3./Fallschirm-Pionier-Bataillon 5 (Scherzer))	12 March 1945	—	—
Richard Bausch	Heer	Hauptmann of the Reserves	Leader of the II./Grenadier-Regiment 57	9 June 1944	—	—
Karl Baxmann	Heer	Oberleutnant	Leader of the II./Panzergrenadier-Regiment 73	14 May 1944	—	—
Anton Bayer	Heer	Oberfeldwebel	Zugführer (platoon leader) in the 14.(Panzerjäger)/Grenadier-Regiment 19 (Note: As Zugführer (platoon leader) in the 14./Grenadier-Regiment 19 (Scherzer))	5 October 1943	—	—
Franz Bayer? (Note: Franz Bayer's nomination by the I./Panzer-Regiment 26 was written on 1 January 1945 and was approved by the III. Panzerkorps on 11 January 1945. The Division "Feldherrnhalle" had also submitted a nomination on 25 January 1945. Both nominations were sent to the 6th Army. Here they were left unattended, later consolidated, and approved by the commander-in-chief General Hermann Balck on 15 April 1945 and then forwarded to the Army Group. This nomination was received by the Heerespersonalamt (HPA—Army Staff Office) "Hauptbüro" (main office) on 28 April 1945, in this instance the 2nd squadron and not the 1st squadron. The Army Group South had made an error and wrongly addressed it to the HPA 2nd squadron. The Army Group, against regulation, had also not commented on the nomination and had explicitly mentioned this in the accompanying letter. The reason for this remains unknown. The entry date of 25 January 1945 which is noted on the file card is not the entry date but the date on which the Division "Feldherrnhalle" had created their nomination. The book "Verliehene Ritterkreuze" (Awarded Knight Crosses) does not list Bayer. No further proof that the presentation was made can be found in the archives. According to the Association of Knight's Cross Recipients (AKCR) the award was presented in accordance with the Dönitz-decree. This is illegal according to the Deutsche Dienststelle (WASt) and lacks legal justification. Bayer himself stated on 10 February 2005 that the I./Panzer-Regiment 26 had "lent" him to the Division "Feldherrnhalle" where he was deployed as a company commander. He also stated that the battalion commander had presented him a Knight's Cross in January 1945 after he had received a radio message approving the nomination.)	Heer	Hauptmann	Commander of the I./Panzer-Regiment 26	9 May 1945	—	—
Hans Bayer	Luftwaffe	Hauptmann	Staffelkapitän of the 3.(F)/Aufklärungs-Gruppe 33 (Note: As Staffelkapitän of the Aufklärungsstaffel 3.(F)/33 (Scherzer))	1 May 1945	—	—
Heinz Bayer	Heer	Oberstleutnant	Commander of Kradschützen-Bataillon 22	17 July 1941	—	—
Rudolf Bayer	Heer	Oberfeldwebel	Zugführer (platoon leader) in the 14.(Panzerjäger)/Grenadier-Regiment 112 (Note: As Zugführer (platoon leader) in the 14./Grenadier-Regiment 112 (Scherzer))	21 February 1944	—	—
Fritz Bayerlein+	Heer	Oberstleutnant im Generalstab (in the General Staff)	Chief of the general staff Generalstab DAK	26 December 1941	Awarded 258th Oak Leaves 6 July 1943; 81st Swords 20 July 1944	A black-and-white photograph of an older man wearing a military uniform, field cap and a neck order in shape of an Iron Cross.
Sigurt-Horstmar Freiherr von Beaulieu-Marconnay	Heer	Oberst	Commander of Grenadier-Regiment 29 (motorized)	20 January 1943	—	—
Karl Becher	Heer	Oberwachtmeister	Battery officer in the 8./Artillerie-Regiment 125	25 October 1943	—	—
Helmut Bechler	Heer	Oberst	Commander of Grenadier-Regiment 504	26 March 1943	—	—
Josef Beck	Heer	Feldwebel	Zugführer (platoon leader) in the 7./Grenadier-Regiment 320	11 March 1945	—	—
Karl Beck	Heer	Major	Commander of the I./Grenadier-Regiment 290	2 April 1943	—	—
Wilhelm Beck	Waffen-SS	SS-Obersturmführer (Note: As SS-Obersturmführer of the Reserves and leader of the 2./SS-Panzer-Regiment "Leibstandarte SS Adolf Hitler" (Scherzer))	Leader of the 2./SS-Panzer-Regiment 1 "Leibstandarte SS Adolf Hitler"	28 March 1943	—	—
Helmut Beck-Broichsitter	Heer	Oberleutnant	Chief of the 14.(Panzerjäger)/Infanterie-Regiment "Großdeutschland" (Note: As chief of the 14./Infanterie-Regiment "Großdeutschland" (Scherzer))	4 September 1940	—	—
Anton Becker	Heer	Hauptmann (Note: As Hauptmann of the Reserves (Scherzer))	Regiment adjutant of Grenadier-Regiment 77	5 April 1945	—	—
Arthur Becker	Heer	Unteroffizier	Group leader in the 7./Schützen-Regiment 394	25 August 1941	—	—
Carl Becker+	Heer	Oberst	Commander of Infanterie-Regiment 18	29 October 1942	Awarded 829th Oak Leaves 14 April 1945	—
Erich Becker	Heer	Major	Commander of Grenadier-Regiment-Gruppe 425 (Note: As commander of Regiments-Gruppe 425 (Scherzer))	21 September 1944	—	—
Felix Becker	Heer	Oberst	Commander of Grenadier-Regiment 418	25 January 1943	—	—
Fritz Becker	Heer	Generalmajor	Commander of the 370. Infanterie-Division	6 April 1943	—	—
Günther Becker	Luftwaffe	Oberfeldwebel	Pilot in the 3./Fernaufklärungs-Gruppe 122	28 February 1945	—	—
Hanns Becker	Heer	Major of the Reserves	Commander of Ost-Bataillon 439	23 August 1944	—	—
Hans Becker	Waffen-SS	SS-Hauptsturmführer	Chief of the 2./SS-Panzerzgrenadier-Regiment 2 "Leibstandarte SS Adolf Hitler"	28 March 1943	—	—
Hans Becker	Heer	Leutnant	Leader of the 2./Infanterie-Regiment 116	28 November 1940	—	—
Heinrich Becker	Heer	Oberfeldwebel	Zugführer (platoon leader) in the 8./Panzer-Regiment 31	15 March 1943	—	—
Heinrich Becker	Heer	Unteroffizier	Group leader in the 8./Grenadier-Regiment 529	6 April 1944	—	—
Hellmuth Becker+	Waffen-SS	SS-Standartenführer	Commander of SS-Panzergrenadier-Regiment 6 "Theodor Eicke" (Note: As commander of SS-Panzergrenadier-Regiment "Theodor Eicke" (Scherzer))	7 September 1943	Awarded 595th Oak Leaves 21 September 1944	
Karl-Heinz Becker+	Luftwaffe	Oberleutnant	Chief of the 11./Fallschirmjäger-Regiment 1	9 July 1941	Awarded 780th Oak Leaves 12 March 1945	A man wearing a military uniform with an Iron Cross displayed at the front of his uniform collar.
Karl-Heinz Becker	Heer	Leutnant of the Reserves	Leader of the I./Infanterie-Regiment 503	27 January 1942	—	—
Karl-Heinz Becker	Heer	Leutnant of the Reserves	Leader of the 2./Jäger-Regiment 228	20 March 1944	—	—
Ludwig Becker+	Luftwaffe	Oberleutnant (Note: As Oberleutnant of the Reserves and Staffelkapitän of the 6./Nachtjagdgeschwader 1 (Scherzer))	Staffelkapitän of the 12./Nachtjagdgeschwader 1	1 July 1942	Awarded 198th Oak Leaves 26 February 1943	—
Martin Becker+	Luftwaffe	Oberleutnant	Pilot in the IV./Nachtjagdgeschwader 6 (Note: As a pilot in the II./Nachtjagdgeschwader 6 (Scherzer))	1 April 1944	Awarded 792nd Oak Leaves 20 March 1945	—
Paul Becker	Heer	Obergefreiter	Richtkanonier (gunner) in the 10./Artillerie-Regiment 3 (motorized)	25 October 1942	—	—
Rudolf Becker	Heer	Oberleutnant	Chief of the 1./Panzergrenadier-Regiment 66	23 February 1944	—	—
Wilhelm Becker	Luftwaffe	Unteroffizier	Gun leader in the II./Flak-Regiment 43	4 May 1944	—	—
Wilhelm Becker	Heer	Oberfeldwebel	Zugführer (platoon leader) in the Panzer-Jäger-Kompanie 1299	18 February 1945	—	—
Friedrich Beckh	Luftwaffe	Major	Geschwaderkommodore of Jagdgeschwader 51	18 September 1941	—	A man wearing a military uniform, peaked cap, and an Iron Cross displayed at the front of his uniform collar.
Josef Beckmann	Heer	Obergefreiter	In the Stab III./Füsilier-Regiment 39	7 September 1943	—	—
Dr. Julius Beckmann	Heer	Oberstleutnant	Commander of Grenadier-Regiment 457 (Note: As leader of Grenadier-Regiment 457 (Scherzer))	9 June 1944	—	—
Ludwig Beckmann	Luftwaffe	Oberstleutnant (Note: As Oberstleutnant of the Reserves and commander of Kampfgruppe z.b.V. 500 (Scherzer))	Commander of Kampfgruppe z.b.V. 500 (Transportflieger)	14 March 1943	—	—
Ludwig Beckmann	Heer	Oberwachtmeister	Vorgeschobener Beobachter (artillery observer) in the 2./Panzer-Artillerie-Regiment 27	26 October 1943	—	—
Theodor Beckmann	Luftwaffe	Oberst	Gruppenkommandeur of the IV./Kampfgeschwader z.b.V. 1	23 December 1942	—	—
Horst Beeger	Luftwaffe	Oberleutnant	Staffelkapitän of the 3.(K)/Lehrgeschwader 1	23 November 1941	—	—
Franz-Josef Beerenbrock+	Luftwaffe	Unteroffizier	Pilot in the 10./Jagdgeschwader 51	6 October 1941	Awarded 108th Oak Leaves 3 August 1942	
Franz Begemann	Heer	Leutnant of the Reserves	Leader of the 1./Panzer-Regiment 21 (Note: As leader of the 1./Panzer-Abteilung 21 (Scherzer))	19 December 1943	—	—
Hermann Begemann	Heer	Oberstleutnant	Commander of Infanterie-Regiment 132	18 December 1942	—	—
Josef Beginen	Heer	Oberfeldwebel	Zugführer (platoon leader) in the 4./Panzer-Regiment 35	23 February 1944	—	—
Hans Behlendorff	Heer	Generalleutnant	Commander of the 34. Infanterie-Division	11 October 1941	—	—
Klemens Behler	Waffen-SS	SS-Obersturmführer	Chief of the 3./SS-Artillerie-Regiment 54 "Nederland" (Note: As chief of the 3./SS-Artillerie-Regiment 54 (Scherzer))	17 March 1945	—	—
Herbert Behm	Luftwaffe	Oberleutnant	Chief of the 4./Flak-Regiment 33	1 April 1945	—	—
Friedrich Behne	Heer	Major of the Reserves	Commander of Sicherungs-Bataillon 738	26 March 1944	—	—
Gerhard Behnke+	Heer	Hauptmann	Leader of Sturmgeschütz-Abteilung 203	8 February 1943	Awarded 605th Oak Leaves 4 October 1944	—
Heinz Behnke	Heer	Leutnant of the Reserves	Zugführer (platoon leader) in the 14.(Panzerjäger)/Grenadier-Regiment 668 (Note: As Zugführer (platoon leader) in the 14./Grenadier-Regiment 668 (Scherzer))	20 January 1944	—	—
Hans Behnken	Heer	Hauptmann zur Verwendung (for disposition)	Commander of the I./Grenadier-Regiment 161	19 December 1942	—	—
Heinrich Baron von Behr+	Heer	Oberst	Commander of Panzergrenadier-Regiment 200 (motorized)	23 February 1944	Awarded 689th Oak Leaves 9 January 1945	—
Paul Behr	Heer	Hauptmann of the Reserves	Chief of the 13./Füsilier-Regiment 39	28 March 1945	—	—
Rudolf Behr	Heer	Hauptmann	Company chief in the III./Panzergrenadier-Regiment 201	25 January 1943	—	—
Winrich Behr	Heer	Oberleutnant	Chief of the 3./Aufklärungs-Abteilung 3 im DAK (Note: As chief of the 3./Aufklärungs-Abteilung (motorized) 3 (Scherzer))	15 May 1941	—	—
Friedrich Behre? (Note: Friedrich Behre's Luftwaffenpersonalamt-Verleihungsvorschlag (LPA-VV—Air Force Staff Office Nomination Recommendation) Nr. 1573 was sent to the adjutancy of the Reichsmarschall Hermann Göring on 14 April 1945 for further processing. This recommendation was then forwarded to the adjutancy of the "Führer" on 18 April and never returned. The nomination was never finalized and was left unfinished by the end of the war. A radio message dated on 12 May 1945 from the LPA to the Luftflotte Reich stated that Behre was awarded the Knight's Cross "on this day" and is therefore illegal.)	Luftwaffe	Leutnant	Company leader in the I./Fallschirm-Panzergrenadier-Regiment 1 "Hermann Göring"	9 May 1945	—	—
Hermann-Heinrich Behrend+	Heer	Major	Commander of the I./Infanterie-Regiment 489	15 July 1941	Awarded 421st Oak Leaves 6 March 1944 (148th) Swords 26 April 1945	—
Heinrich Behrends	Heer	Unteroffizier	Group leader in the 6./Panzergrenadier-Regiment 5	24 December 1944	—	—
Heinz-Georg Behrens	Heer	Leutnant of the Reserves	Deputy leader of the 3./Panzer-Abteilung 5	12 March 1944	—	—
Wilhelm Behrens	Heer	Oberst	Commander of Infanterie-Regiment 106	27 March 1942	—	—
Gerhard Beier	Heer	Leutnant of the Reserves	Leader of Panzer-Jäger-Kompanie 1193	17 March 1945	—	—
Karl Beier	Luftwaffe	Oberleutnant	Pilot, observer and Verbindungsoffizier (liaison officer) to the 5th Romanian Kampfgruppe (Note: As a pilot and Verbindungsoffizier (liaison officer) to the 5th Romanian Kampfgruppe [Knight's Cross for his services as a pilot in the 3./Kampfgeschwader 3] (Scherzer))	6 December 1944	—	—
Wilhelm Beier	Luftwaffe	Oberfeldwebel	Pilot in the 3./Nachtjagdgeschwader 2	10 October 1941	—	
Fritz Beigel	Heer	Major	Commander of Panzer-Pionier-Bataillon 39	9 July 1941	—	—
Xaver Beilhack	Heer	Leutnant of the Reserves	Leader of the 9./Grenadier-Regiment 19 "List"	5 November 1944	—	—
Erich Beine	Luftwaffe	Hauptmann	Leader of the I./Fallschirmjäger-Regiment 12 (Note: Knight's Cross of the Iron Cross on 18 November 1944 as leader of the III./Fallschirmjäger-Sturm-Regiment (12) (Scherzer))	5 September 1944	—	A man wearing a military uniform with an Iron Cross displayed at the front of his uniform collar.
Hans Beißwenger+	Luftwaffe	Leutnant	Pilot in the 6./Jagdgeschwader 54	9 May 1942	Awarded 130th Oak Leaves 30 September 1942	—
Franz Graf von Bellegarde	Heer	Hauptmann	Chief of the 3./Panzer-Aufklärungs-Abteilung 4	28 November 1940	—	—
Hans-Joachim Bellinger	Luftwaffe	Hauptmann (Note: As Hauptmann of the Reserves (Scherzer))	Chief of the 9./Fallschirm-Panzer-Regiment "Hermann Göring"	30 September 1944	—	—
Ludwig Bellof	Luftwaffe	Oberfeldwebel	Pilot in the 1./Nacht-Schlacht-Gruppe 3	28 January 1945	—	—
Dr.-Ing. Fritz Below	Heer	Oberstleutnant	Commander of Grenadier-Regiment 669	21 September 1944	—	—
Gerd-Paul von Below	Heer	Oberst of the Reserves	Commander of the augmented Grenadier-Regiment 374	28 February 1943	—	—
Helmut Belser	Luftwaffe	Hauptmann	Staffelkapitän of the 3./Jagdgeschwader 53 (Note: As Staffelkapitän of the 8./Jagdgeschwader 53 (Scherzer))	6 September 1942	—	—
Bruno Belz	Heer	Oberleutnant	Chief of the 3./Panzergrenadier-Regiment 25	30 April 1945	—	—
Josef Belz	Luftwaffe	Oberleutnant (Note: As Oberleutnant of the Reserves and pilot in Kampfgruppe z.b.V. 500 (Scherzer))	Pilot in Kampfgeschwader z.b.V. 500	23 December 1942	—	—
Hans Belzer	Heer	Major of the Reserves	Commander of the IV./Artillerie-Regiment 227	4 October 1944	—	—
Gerhard Benack	Heer	Oberleutnant	Chief of the 1./Kradschützen-Bataillon 38	13 August 1941	—	—
Hans-Wilhelm Bender	Luftwaffe	Oberfeldwebel	Pilot in the 5./Kampfgeschwader 3	8 September 1941	—	—
Karl-Heinz Bendert	Luftwaffe	Oberfeldwebel	Pilot in the 5./Jagdgeschwader 27 (Note: As a pilot in the II./Jagdgeschwader 27 (Scherzer))	30 December 1942	—	—
Johann Benedikt	Heer	Obergefreiter	Kompanietruppmelder (company headquarters messenger) in the 6./Gebirgsjäger-Regiment 138	11 December 1943	—	—
Peter Benekamp	Heer	Feldwebel	Kompanietruppführer (company headquarters leader) in the 2./Grenadier-Regiment 546	28 October 1944	—	—
Helmut Benkendorff	Luftwaffe	Oberfeldwebel	Pilot in the II./Sturzkampfgeschwader 1	26 March 1943	—	—
Hans Bennemann	Luftwaffe	Oberleutnant	Pilot in the 7./Kampfgeschwader 55	26 March 1944	—	—
[Dr.] Helmut Bennemann	Luftwaffe	Hauptmann	Gruppenkommandeur of the I./Jagdgeschwader 52	2 October 1942	—	—
Heinrich Benner	Heer	Hauptmann of the Reserves	Commander of the II./Panzer-Artillerie-Regiment 102	27 October 1944	—	—
[Dr.] Anton Benning	Luftwaffe	Leutnant	Staffelkapitän of the 1./Jagdgeschwader 301	13 April 1945	—	—
Hans-Georg Benthack? (Note: Unlawful presentation of the Knight's Cross of the Iron Cross to Hans-Georg Benthack by the Dönitz Government after 8 May 1945. This can be verified by the radio communication dated on 21 May 1945. The presentation date was backdated by Walther-Peer Fellgiebel.)	Heer	Generalmajor	Commander of Festungs-Division Kreta	10 May 1945	—	—
Kurt Bentin	Heer	Oberleutnant	Leader of Grenadier-Bataillon 8/9 "Feldherrnhalle" in the Festung (fortress) Schneidemühl (Note: As leader of Grenadier-Bataillon 8/IX in the Festung (fortress) Schneidemühl [Geneisenau-Einheit des Wehrkreis IX] (Scherzer))	12 February 1945	—	—
Kurt Benz	Luftwaffe	Hauptmann	Staffelführer of Kampfgruppe z.b.V. 500	24 March 1943	—	—
Otto Benzin+	Heer	Oberleutnant of the Reserves	Chief of the 9./Infanterie-Regiment 89	31 December 1941	Awarded 406th Oak Leaves 22 February 1944	—
Werner von Bercken	Heer	Generalleutnant	Commander of the 102. Infanterie-Division	23 October 1944	—	—
Anton Berg	Heer	Major	Commander of the I./Grenadier-Regiment 358	16 October 1944	—	—
Karl-Erich Berg	Heer	Oberleutnant	Chief of the 2./Sturmgeschütz-Abteilung 191	6 April 1944	—	—
Martin Berg	Heer	Oberst	Commander of Grenadier-Regiment 166	30 December 1943	—	—
Wilhelm Berg	Heer	Oberwachtmeister	Vorgeschobener Beobachter (artillery observer) in the 11./Artillerie-Regiment 361	9 June 1944	—	—
Karl Bergelt	Kriegsmarine	Korvettenkapitän	Chief of the 1. Minensuchflottille	3 August 1942	—	—
Hans Bergen	Heer	Oberst	Commander of Infanterie-Regiment 187	9 July 1941	—	—
Franz Berger	Heer	Feldwebel	Shock troops leader in the 11./Infanterie-Regiment 130	19 July 1940	—	—
Fritz Berger	Kriegsmarine	Fregattenkapitän	Chief of the 1. Zerstörerflottille	4 August 1940	—	—
Heinz Berger	Heer	Gefreiter	Richtschütze (gunner) in the 14.(Panzerjäger)/Infanterie-Regiment 187 (Note: As Richtschütze (gunner) in the 14./Infanterie-Regiment 187 (Scherzer))	17 September 1941	—	
Heinz Arthur Berger	Luftwaffe	Oberleutnant	Battery leader in the II./Flak-Regiment 411 in the Flak-Regiment 151 (motorized) (Note: As leader of the 2./Flak-Regiment (motorized) 411 (Scherzer))	3 April 1943	—	—
Herbert Berger	Heer	Oberfeldwebel	Zugführer (platoon leader) in the 10./Grenadier-Regiment (motorized) "Feldherrnhalle"	12 March 1944	—	—
Karl Berger	Luftwaffe	Leutnant of the Reserves	Company leader in the 10./Fallschirmjäger-Regiment 15	7 February 1945	—	—
Lothar Berger+	Heer	Major	Commander of the III./Infanterie-Regiment 84	5 August 1940	Awarded 806th Oak Leaves 28 March 1945	—
Robert Berger	Heer	Major	Commander of the I./Grenadier-Regiment 2	7 March 1944	—	—
Rudolf Berger	Heer	Feldwebel	Zugführer (platoon leader) in the 1./Pionier-Bataillon 296	14 April 1943	—	—
Dr. jur. Günther Bergerhoff	Heer	Oberleutnant of the Reserves	Adjutant of the I./Grenadier-Regiment 162	15 April 1944	—	—
Kurt Bergerhoff	Heer	Oberleutnant (Note: As Oberleutnant of the Reserves (Scherzer))	Chief of the 3./Panzer-Aufklärungs-Abteilung 23	27 August 1944*	Killed in action 10 August 1944	—
Gustav Bergmann	Heer	Obergefreiter	Group leader in the 9./Grenadier-Regiment 696	4 October 1942	—	—
Heinz Bergmann	Heer	Oberfeldwebel	Zugführer (platoon leader) in the 4./Panzer-Regiment 26	26 November 1944	—	—
Helmut Bergmann	Luftwaffe	Hauptmann	Staffelkapitän of the 8./Nachtjagdgeschwader 4	9 June 1944	—	—
Rolf Bering	Heer	Major	Leader of the Fähnrichs-Regiment 1 of the Division "Märkisch Friedland" (Note: In Fähnrichs-Regiment 1 of the Division "Märkisch Friedland" (Scherzer))	11 March 1945	—	—
Wilhelm Berkenbusch	Heer	Oberfeldwebel	Zugführer (platoon leader) in the I./Grenadier-Regiment 914	15 January 1945	—	—
Wilhelm Berlin	Heer	Generalleutnant	Commander of the 227. Infanterie-Division	6 March 1944	—	—
Matthias Bermadinger	Luftwaffe	Oberleutnant	Staffelkapitän of the 14./Kampfgeschwader 55	5 April 1944*	Killed in action 18 February 1944	—
Alois Berndl	Luftwaffe	Oberfeldwebel	Air gunner in the III./Schlachtgeschwader 1	16 June 1944	—	—
Rudolf Berneike	Luftwaffe	Major	Leader of Fallschirmjäger-Regiment 15	15 March 1945	—	—
Emil Berner	Luftwaffe	Gefreiter	Richtkanonier (gunner) in the 3./Flak-Regiment 18	3 November 1942	—	—
Erhard Berner	Heer	Oberst	Commander of Jäger-Regiment 28	18 January 1945	—	—
[Dr.] Alfred Bernhard	Heer	Hauptmann	Chief inspector at the Heeres-Unteroffiziers-Schule Jauer (Note: As chief inspector at the Heeres-Unteroffiziers-Schule Jauer and commander of the Kampfgruppe "Steinau" (Scherzer))	14 February 1945	—	—
Hans Bernhard	Heer	Hauptmann of the Reserves	Commander of the II./Grenadier-Regiment 165	9 January 1945	—	—
Julius von Bernuth	Heer	Oberstleutnant of the Reserves	Chief of the general staff of the XV. Armeekorps	5 August 1940	—	
Herbert Berrer	Kriegsmarine	Oberfernschreibmeister (rank equivalent to Oberfeldwebel)	Einzelkämpfer (lone fighter) in a Kleinkampf Verband (small units detachment) (Note: As Einmanntorpedofahrer (one man torpedo driver) in the Kleinkampfflottille 361 (Scherzer))	5 August 1944	—	—
Heinz-Edgar Berres	Luftwaffe	Oberleutnant	Staffelkapitän of the 1./Jagdgeschwader 77	19 September 1943*	Killed in action 25 July 1943	—
Gerhard Berthold	Heer	Generalmajor	Commander of the 31. Infanterie-Division	4 December 1941	—	—
Hans-Wilhelm Bertram	Luftwaffe	Hauptmann	Staffelkapitän of the 3./Kampfgeschwader 6	14 January 1945	—	—
Karl-Eric Bertram	Luftwaffe	Oberst	Commander of Fallschirm-Panzergrenadier-Regiment 1 "Hermann Göring"	26 March 1945	—	—
Ludwig Bertram	Heer	Oberleutnant	Chief of the 1./Sturmgeschütz-Brigade 237	12 August 1944	—	—
Otto Bertram	Luftwaffe	Hauptmann	Gruppenkommandeur of the III./Jagdgeschwader 2 "Richthofen"	28 October 1940	—	
August Berzen? (Note: August Berzen's nomination of the Außenstelle of the Heerespersonalamt (HPA/A—Branch of the Army Staff Office) was ready for signature at the end of the war. According to the Association of Knight's Cross Recipients (AKCR) the award was presented in accordance with the Dönitz-decree. This is illegal according to the Deutsche Dienststelle (WASt) and lacks legal justification. The presentation date was assigned by Walther-Peer Fellgiebel.)	Heer	Unteroffizier	Festungs-Pak-Kompanie 13/X with the 180. Infanterie-Division	9 May 1945	—	—
Karl Beschle	Heer	Leutnant	Leader of the 4./Artillerie-Regiment 114	3 November 1944	—	—
Werner Beschnidt	Heer	Oberleutnant	Leader of the 2./Panzer-Abteilung 103	4 October 1944	—	—
Werner Freiherr von Beschwitz	Heer	Major	Commander of schwere Panzer-Abteilung 505	27 July 1944	—	—
Erwin Besler	Heer	Rittmeister	Commander of Schnelle Abteilung 123	29 December 1942	—	—
Georg-Robert Beßlein	Waffen-SS	SS-Obersturmbannführer	Commander of SS-Festungs-Regiment 1 "Beßlein" in the Festung Breslau (fortress Breslau) (Note: As commander of SS-Regiment "Besslein"/Festung Breslau (fortress Breslau) (Scherzer))	30 April 1945	—	—
Walter Bestmann	Waffen-SS	SS-Sturmbannführer	Commander of Aufklärungs-Abteilung "Totenkopf" (Note: As commander of SS-"Totenkopf"-Aufklärungs-Abteilung (motorized) (Scherzer))	28 September 1941	—	—
Hans-Günther Bethke	Heer	Oberleutnant	Leader of the 5./Panzer-Regiment 11	4 September 1940	—	—
Siegfried Betke	Luftwaffe	Oberleutnant	Staffelkapitän of the 9./Kampfgeschwader 26	8 August 1944	—	—
Franz-Eugen Betz (Note: According to Scherzer the recipient's name was Franz-Xaver Betz.)	Heer	Unteroffizier	Group leader in the 7./Infanterie-Regiment 41 (motorized)	30 August 1942*	Killed in action 22 August 1942	—
Karl Betz	Heer	Hauptmann	Leader of the II./Schützen-Regiment 2	6 March 1942	—	—
Paul Betz	Heer	Oberst	Leader of the 50. Infanterie-Division	16 June 1944*	Killed in action 9 May 1944	—
Clemens Betzel+	Heer	Generalmajor	Commander of the 4. Panzer-Division	5 September 1944	Awarded 774th Oak Leaves 11 March 1945	—
Helmuth Beukemann	Heer	Oberst	Commander of Infanterie-Regiment 382	14 May 1941	—	—
Lothar Beukemann	Heer	Major	Commander of Panzer-Pionier-Bataillon 79	25 January 1945	—	—
Hans-Henning Freiherr von Beust+	Luftwaffe	Hauptmann	Gruppenkommandeur of the III./Kampfgeschwader 27 "Boelcke"	17 September 1941	Awarded 336th Oak Leaves 25 November 1943	—
Ernst Beutelspacher	Luftwaffe	Oberleutnant	Staffelführer of the 6./Schlachtgeschwader 2 "Immelmann"	4 May 1944	—	—
Heinz Beutler	Heer	Oberleutnant	Chief of the 3./Panzer-Regiment 2	14 February 1945	—	—
Walter Beutler	Heer	Oberwachtmeister	Gun leader in the 3./Sturmgeschütz-Abteilung 245	13 August 1943	—	—
Manfred Beutner	Heer	Major	Division adjutant of the 329. Infanterie-Division and commander of Schnelle Abteilung 329 (Note: As IIa (1st adjutant for the officer staff) 329. Infanterie-Division and leader of augmented Grenadier-Regiment 551 (Scherzer))	30 September 1944	—	—
Wilhelm Beuttel	Heer	Major of the Reserves	Commander of the II./Grenadier-Regiment 45	5 March 1945	—	—
Heinz Bevernis	Luftwaffe	Oberfeldwebel	Air gunner in the 7./Sturzkampfgeschwader 1	19 September 1942*	Killed in action 19 July 1942	—
Erich Bey	Kriegsmarine	Kapitän zur See	Chief of the 4. Zerstörerflottille	9 May 1940	—	A man wearing a black military uniform with an Iron Cross displayed at the front of his uniform collar.
Franz Beyer	Luftwaffe	Oberleutnant	Staffelkapitän of the 8./Jagdgeschwader 3 (Note: As a pilot in the 8./Jagdgeschwader 3 (Scherzer))	30 August 1941	—	
Dr.-jur. Franz Beyer	Heer	Oberst	Commander of Infanterie-Regiment 131	12 September 1941	—	—
Herbert Beyer	Luftwaffe	Hauptmann	Commander of the I./Fallschirmjäger-Regiment 4	9 June 1944	—	—
Reinhard Beyer	Heer	Oberleutnant of the Reserves	Chief of the 2./Infanterie-Regiment 694	17 October 1942	—	—
Alfons Bialetzki	Heer	Leutnant of the Reserves	Leader of the 1./Grenadier-Regiment 333	17 September 1944	—	—
Ernst Freiherr von Bibra	Luftwaffe	Major	Gruppenkommandeur of the III./Kampfgeschwader 51	23 December 1942	—	—
Rolf-Günther Bickel	Heer	Oberst	Artilleriekommandeur 35	8 August 1944	—	—
Martin Bieber+	Heer	Oberst	Commander of Grenadier-Regiment 184	28 July 1943	Awarded 566th Oak Leaves 2 September 1944	—
Albert Biecker	Heer	Hauptmann der Landwehr	Chief of the 9./Infanterie-Regiment 386	18 March 1942	—	—
Karl Bieg	Heer	Hauptmann	Leader of the II./Grenadier-Regiment 868	17 September 1943	—	—
Arnold Freiherr von Biegeleben	Heer	Generalleutnant	Commander of the 6. Infanterie-Division	5 August 1940	—	—
Fritz Biegi	Waffen-SS	SS-Oberscharführer	Zugführer (platoon leader) in the 5./SS-Panzergrenadier-Regiment 9 "Germania"	16 June 1944	—	—
Johann Biehl	Heer	Feldwebel	Zugführer (platoon leader) in the 2./Infanterie-Regiment 124	30 July 1942	—	—
Ernst Biehler? (Note: Ernst Biehler's nomination by his unit, without the mandatory explanatory statement, was received by the Heerespersonalamt (HPA—Army Staff Office) on 20 April 1945 as a teleprinter messenger. On 21 April 1945 the nomination arrived at the time 1. Squadron of the HPA was relocating. The teleprinter message indicated that the explanatory statement would follow later. This statement was either never sent, may have gotten delayed or lost, or at least does not exist anymore. Biehler was also not listed in the Knight's Cross nomination book nor was a file card created. A presentation cannot be verified in the German Federal Archives. According to the Association of Knight's Cross Recipients (AKCR) the award was presented in accordance with the Dönitz-decree. This is illegal according to the Deutsche Dienststelle (WASt) and lacks legal justification. The presentation date was assigned by Walther-Peer Fellgiebel. Biehler was a member of the AKCR.)	Heer	Generalmajor	Festung (fortress) commander of Frankfurt/Oder	9 May 1945	—	—
Bruno Bieler	Heer	Generalleutnant	Commander of the 73. Infanterie-Division	26 October 1941	—	—
Gerhard Bielig	Kriegsmarine	Kapitänleutnant (Ing.)	Chief engineer on U-177	10 February 1943	—	—
Martin Bielig	Heer	Oberfeldwebel	Zugführer (platoon leader) in the 13./Panzergrenadier-Regiment "Großdeutschland"	7 October 1944	—	—
Fritz Bienek	Heer	Oberleutnant	Chief of the 5./Grenadier-Regiment 281	14 April 1945	—	—
Günther Bierbrauer	Luftwaffe	Feldwebel	Pilot in the 14./Kampfgeschwader 27 "Boelcke"	17 April 1945	—	—
Otto Bierlin	Heer	Rittmeister	Commander of Divisions-Füsilier-Bataillon 35 (Note: As commander of Divisions-Füsilier-Bataillon (AA) 35 (Scherzer))	26 November 1944	—	—
Fritz Biermann	Heer	Oberleutnant	Leader of the 3./Panzer-Aufklärungs-Abteilung 6	31 August 1943	—	—
Fritz Biermeier+	Waffen-SS	SS-Hauptsturmführer	Leader of the II./SS-Panzer-Regiment 3 "Totenkopf" (Note: As leader of the II./SS-Panzer-Regiment 3 (Scherzer))	10 December 1943	Awarded 685th Oak Leaves 26 December 1944	—
Willi Biesenbach	Heer	Oberfeldwebel	Zugführer (platoon leader) in the 2./Heeres-Unteroffizier-Schule Jülich	11 December 1944*	Killed in action 16 November 1944	—
Gerhard Bigalk	Kriegsmarine	Kapitänleutnant	Commander of U-751	26 December 1941	—	A bearded man wearing a white peaked cap, and an Iron Cross displayed at the front of his uniform collar.
Werner Biggemann	Heer	Leutnant of the Reserves	Leader of the 3./Landungs-Pionier-Bataillon 86	26 November 1944	—	—
Dr. Fritz Bingemer	Heer	Oberst	Commander of Infanterie-Regiment 442	9 April 1943	—	—
Otto Binnig	Heer	Obergefreiter	Messenger in the 7./Grenadier-Regiment 463	5 October 1944	—	—
Eberhard von Birckhahn	Heer	Rittmeister (Note: As Rittmeister of the Reserves (Scherzer))	Commander of Aufklärungs-Abteilung 321	10 February 1945	—	—
Walter Birk	Heer	Oberleutnant	Chief of the 2./Divisions-Aufklärungs-Abteilung 44 (Note: As chief of the 2./Aufklärungs-Abteilung 44 (Scherzer))	2 November 1941	—	—
Hans-Joachim Birkner	Luftwaffe	Fahnenjunker-Feldwebel	Pilot in the 9./Jagdgeschwader 52 (Note: As a pilot in the III./Jagdgeschwader 52 (Scherzer))	27 July 1944	—	—
Heinz Birnbacher	Kriegsmarine	Kapitänleutnant	Chief of the 1. Schnellbootflottille	17 June 1940	—	—
Fritz Birnbaum	Luftwaffe	Oberfähnrich	Zugführer (platoon leader) in the 8./Fallschirm-Panzer-Regiment "Hermann Göring"	19 October 1944 (Note: On 18 October 1944 (Scherzer))	—	—
Paul Birnkraut	Luftwaffe	Oberleutnant	Pilot in the 1./Fernaufklärungs-Gruppe 121 (Note: As a pilot in the Aufklärungsstaffel 1.(F)/121 (Scherzer))	10 May 1943	—	—
Kurt Bischof	Heer	Obergefreiter	In the 5./Grenadier-Regiment 337	14 April 1945	—	—
Adolf Bischoff	Heer	Obergefreiter	Group leader in the 1./Panzergenadier-Regiment 112	12 March 1944	—	—
Hans Bischoff	Heer	Major	Leader of Panzergenadier-Regiment 5	9 December 1944	—	—
Leonhard Bischoff	Heer	Leutnant	Zugführer (platoon leader) in the 1./Panzergenadier-Regiment 115	30 April 1945	—	—
Otto Bischoff	Luftwaffe	Oberleutnant	Staffelkapitän of the 4./Kampfgeschwader 77	3 May 1942*	Killed in action 2 April 1942	—
Lothar von Bischoffshausen	Heer	Oberst	Commander of Panzergrenadier-Regiment 2	4 October 1942	—	—
Georg von Bismarck	Heer	Oberst	Commander of Schützen-Regiment 7	29 September 1940	—	—
Klaus von Bismarck+	Heer	Oberleutnant (Note: As Oberleutnant of the Reserves (Scherzer))	Leader of the II./Infanterie-Regiment 4	31 December 1941	Awarded 669th Oak Leaves 26 November 1944	A man wearing a black suit, white shirt and tie.
Joseph Bisping	Luftwaffe	Oberleutnant	Observer in the 4.(F)/Aufklärungs-Gruppe des OB der Luftwaffe (Note: As an observer in the Aufklärungsstaffel 4.(F)/OB der Luftwaffe (Scherzer))	22 October 1941	—	—
Emil Bitsch	Luftwaffe	Oberleutnant	Staffelkapitän of the 8./Jagdgeschwader 3 "Udet"	29 August 1943	—	—
Xaver Bittl	Heer	Oberfeldwebel	Zugführer (platoon leader) in the 3./Grenadier-Regiment 423	4 November 1943	—	—
Georg Bittlingmaier	Heer	Oberleutnant of the Reserves	Leader of the I./Infanterie-Regiment 391	25 July 1942*	Died of wounds 30 June 1942	—
Herwig Bittner	Heer	Leutnant (Note: As Leutnant of the Reserves (Scherzer))	Zugführer (platoon leader) in the 1./Sturmgeschütz-Abteilung 270	18 January 1944	—	—
Rudolf Bittner	Heer	Gefreiter	Richtkanonier (gunner) in the 2./Panzer-Jäger-Abteilung 561	28 November 1942	—	—
Otto Bittorf	Heer	Leutnant	Leader of the 5./Panzergrenadier-Regiment 4	18 November 1944	—	—
Wilhelm Bittrich+	Waffen-SS	SS-Oberführer	Commander of SS-Infanterie-Regiment "Deutschland"	14 December 1941	Awarded 563rd Oak Leaves 28 August 1944 (153rd) Swords 6 May 1945? (Note: The German Federal Archives hold no records for the presentation of the Swords to Wilhelm Bittrich. The award was unlawfully presented by SS-Oberstgruppenführer Sepp Dietrich. The date is taken from the announcement made by the 6. SS-Panzerarmee. The sequential number "153" was assigned by the Association of Knight's Cross Recipients (AKCR). Bittrich was a member of the AKCR.)	A hatless man wearing a military uniform with a neck order in the shape of a cross.
Hermann Bix	Heer	Oberfeldwebel	Zugführer (platoon leader) in the 3./Panzer-Regiment 35	22 March 1945	—	—
Wilhelm Bladt	Heer	Oberleutnant of the Reserves	Chief of the 6./Artillerie-Regiment 30	22 December 1942	—	—
Albert Blaich	Heer	Oberfeldwebel	Zugführer (platoon leader) in the 12./Panzer-Regiment 6	24 July 1941	—	—
Adalbert von Blanc+	Kriegsmarine	Fregattenkapitän	Leader of the 9. Sicherungs-Division	27 November 1944	Awarded (866th) Oak Leaves 10 May 1945? (Note: There is no reference of the Oak Leaves awarded to Adalbert von Blanc in the German Federal Archives although his personnel file contains a letter from Admiral August Thiele indicating that von Blanc had been recommended for the Oak Leaves by Thiele. Further, a German Mine Sweeping Administration file dated just after the capitulation contains an entry reading "Knight's Cross of the Iron Cross with Oak Leaves", but does not indicate a date of the award. The sequential number "866" and date was assigned by the Association of Knight's Cross Recipients (AKCR). Von Blanc was member of the AKCR.)	
Gustav-Adolf Blancbois	Heer	Hauptmann	Commander of the I.(gepanzert)/Panzergrenadier-Regiment 25	20 July 1944	—	—
Kurt Blasberg	Kriegsmarine	Oberleutnant zur See of the Reserves	Group leader in the 36. Minensuchflottille	7 September 1944	—	—
Arnulf Blasig	Luftwaffe	Hauptmann	Gruppenkommandeur of the IV.(Stuka)/Lehrgeschwader 1	4 September 1941	—	—
Johannes Blaskowitz+	Heer	General der Infanterie	Commander-in-Chief of the 8. Armee	30 September 1939	Awarded 640th Oak Leaves 29 October 1944 (146th) Swords 25 April 1945	A man wearing a military uniform with an Iron Cross displayed at the front of his uniform collar.
Ernst Blauensteiner	Luftwaffe	Oberstleutnant im Generalstab (in the General Staff)	Chief of the Generalstab II. Fallschirmkorps	29 October 1944	—	—
Edmund Blaurock+	Heer	Oberst im Generalstab (in the General Staff)	Commander of Grenadier-Regiment 320	27 July 1944	Awarded 746th Oak Leaves 19 February 1945	—
Joachim Blechschmidt	Luftwaffe	Major	Gruppenkommandeur of the I./Zerstörergeschwader 1	17 March 1943	—	
Karl Bleckl	Luftwaffe	Oberleutnant	Staffelführer of the 7./Sturzkampfgeschwader 1 (Note: As Staffelkapitän of the 7./Sturzkampfgeschwader 1 (Scherzer))	3 November 1942	—	—
Günther Bleckmann	Luftwaffe	Hauptmann of the Reserves (Note: As Hauptmann (war officer) and Staffelkapitän of the 6./Schlachtgeschwader 2 "Immelmann" (Scherzer))	Staffelkapitän of the 6. and leader of the II./Schlachtgeschwader 2 "Immelmann"	9 June 1944*	Killed in action 4 June 1944	—
Wilhelm Bleckwenn+	Heer	Oberst	Commander of Grenadier-Regiment 487	6 April 1944	Awarded 621st Oak Leaves 18 October 1944	—
Georg Bleher	Heer	Oberleutnant of the Reserves	Adjutant of the Stab I./Grenadier-Regiment 358 (Note: As adjutant of the I./Grenadier-Regiment 358 (Scherzer))	6 May 1945	—	—
Heinrich Bleichrodt+	Kriegsmarine	Kapitänleutnant	Commander of U-48	24 October 1940	Awarded 125th Oak Leaves 23 September 1942	
Eugen-Heinrich Bleyer	Heer	Oberstleutnant	Commander of Infanterie-Regiment 379	14 December 1941	—	—
Werner Bleyer	Heer	Feldwebel	Zugführer (platoon leader) in the 4./schwere Heeres-Panzer-Jäger-Abteilung 563	24 February 1945	—	—
Fritz Bliesener	Luftwaffe	Leutnant	Pilot in the 5./Kampfgeschwader 55	20 December 1941	—	—
Johann Bloch	Heer	Oberfeldwebel	Kompanietruppführer (company headquarters leader) in the 1./Grenadier-Regiment 44	14 April 1945	—	—
Johannes Block+	Heer	Oberst	Commander of Infanterie-Regiment 202	22 December 1941	Awarded 331st Oak Leaves 22 November 1943	
Josef Block	Heer	Unteroffizier	Group leader in the 5./Grenadier-Regiment 2	6 June 1943	—	—
Erich Bloedorn	Luftwaffe	Major	Gruppenkommandeur of the III./Kampfgeschwader 4 "General Wever"	13 October 1940	—	A man wearing a suit, shirt and tie.
Friedrich Blond? (Note: There is no evidence of the award for Friedrich Blond in the German Federal Archives. Scherzer consulted Ernst-Günther Krätschmer's book Die Ritterkreuzträger der Waffen-SS [The Knight's Cross Bearers of the Waffen-SS] (pages 943–946) and stated that the award was presented together with the Oak Leaves to Matthias Kleinheisterkamp. Presumably the announcement was made via radio transmission on 28 April 1945 from the Führer Headquarters in Berlin to the 9. Armee (9th Army) in the Halbe pocket. The radio transmissions received by the AOK 9 (Armeeoberkommando 9 — high command of the 9th Army) in April 1945 were not retained. All communication to the Führerbunker in Berlin was out of order as of 5 am on 28 April. The order commission of the Association of Knight's Cross Recipients (AKCR) processed the case in 1981 and decided: "Knight's Cross yes, 28 April 1945". Blond was a member of the AKCR.)	Waffen-SS	SS-Untersturmführer	Leader of the 12./SS-Panzergrenadier Ausbildung und Ersatz Bataillon 1 "Leibstandarte SS Adolf Hitler"	28 April 1945	—	—
Ludwig Bloos	Heer	Oberfeldwebel	Zugführer (platoon leader) in the 8./Panzer-Regiment 11	6 April 1944	—	—
Wolfgang Graf von Blücher(-Fincken)	Luftwaffe	Leutnant of the Reserves	Zugführer (platoon leader) in the 2./Fallschirmjäger-Regiment 1	24 May 1940	Killed in action 21 May 1941	A man wearing a military uniform, peaked cap, and an Iron Cross displayed at the front of his uniform collar.
Josef Blümel	Luftwaffe	Feldwebel	Pilot in the 10.(Panzer)/Schlachtgeschwader 3	28 January 1945*	Killed after forced landing 19 September 1944	—
Friedrich Blümke	Heer	Oberst	Commander of Grenadier-Regiment 347	6 November 1943	—	—
Oskar Blümm	Heer	Generalleutnant	Commander of the 57. Infanterie-Division	23 November 1941	—	
Hermann Blume	Heer	Rittmeister	Commander of Panzer-Aufklärungs-Abteilung 24	11 March 1945	—	—
Werner Blume	Luftwaffe	Leutnant (Note: As Leutnant of the Reserves and pilot in the Aufklärungsstaffel 1.(F)/122 (Scherzer))	Pilot in the 1./Fernaufklärungs-Gruppe 122	1 July 1942	—	—
Willi Blumenroth	Heer	Unteroffizier	Group leader in the 3./Infanterie-Regiment 124	23 October 1941	—	—
Carl-Ludwig Blumenthal	Heer	Oberleutnant of the Reserves	Chief of the 7./Infanterie-Regiment "Großdeutschland" (Note: As chief of the 7./Infanterie-Regiment "Großdeutschland" 1 (Scherzer))	18 September 1942	—	—
Günther Blumentritt+	Heer	General der Infanterie	Chief of the Generalstab Heeresruppe D	13 September 1944	Awarded 741st Oak Leaves 18 February 1945	—
