= I Cavalry Corps (Wehrmacht) =

German Wehrmacht army corps

The I Cavalry Corps (German: I. Kavalleriekorps), initially known simply as the Cavalry Corps (German: Kavalleriekorps), or alternatively as Cavalry Corps Harteneck (German: Kavalleriekorps "Harteneck") after its commander, was an army corps of the German Wehrmacht during World War II. It was formed in 1944 and existed until 1945.

== History ==
The Cavalry Corps was formed on 25 May 1944 in the General Government, using most of the personnel of the short-lived LXXVIII Army Corps. The corps was commanded throughout its lifetime by Gustav Harteneck, earning it the nickname Cavalry Corps Harteneck. The corps served at times under the 2nd Army, 4th Army, 6th Army and 2nd Panzer Army.

Starting in June 1944, the Cavalry Corps was deployed on the Eastern Front against the Red Army. The corps, not yet fully deployed and operational, was thrown against the Soviet forces that advanced against the German lines as part of Operation Bagration, the Soviet offensive which brought about the collapse of the German Army Group Centre. After the end of Bagration, the Cavalry Corps fought at the Narew river and in East Prussia.

The Cavalry Corps was known as I Cavalry Corps starting in February 1945.

The I Cavalry Corps participated in the failed Operation Spring Awakening in March 1945, the last major German offensive during World War II. After the failure of Spring Awakening, the I Cavalry Corps staged a fighting retreat towards Austria. After German surrender on 8 May 1945, the corps, still largely intact, was taken prisoner by British Army forces and transported to Württemberg and Hesse. Subsequently, the surrendered formations were formally dissolved by the United States Army in June 1945. The horses were confiscated by the Allies and repurposed for agricultural tasks.

== Legacy ==
The I Cavalry Corps was the last major cavalry formation in German military history. After the re-establishment of independent German military forces in 1955, the Bundeswehr of West Germany and the National People's Army of East Germany did not establish significant cavalry formations.

== Structure ==
Organizational chart of the Cavalry Corps (later I Cavalry Corps) of the Wehrmacht
Year	Date	Subordinate units	Army	Army Group
1944	31 August	3rd Cavalry Brigade, 4th Cavalry Brigade, Panzerbrigade 104, 14th Infantry, 102nd Infantry, 129th Infantry	2nd Army	Army Group Centre
1944	16 September	3rd Cavalry Brigade, 4th Cavalry Brigade, 14th Infantry, 102nd Infantry, 129th Infantry	2nd Army	Army Group Centre
1944	13 October	14th Infantry, 102nd Infantry, 129th Infantry, 292nd Infantry	2nd Army	Army Group Centre
1944	5 November	3rd Cavalry Brigade, 4th Cavalry Brigade, 558th Infantry	4th Army	Army Group Centre
1944	26 November	3rd Cavalry Brigade, 4th Cavalry Brigade, 558th Infantry	4th Army	Army Group Centre
1944	31 December	1st Panzer, 23rd Panzer, 4th Cavalry Brigade	6th Army	Army Group South
1945	19 February	6th Panzer, 3rd Cavalry Brigade, 96th Infantry, 711th Infantry	6th Army	Army Group South
1945	1 March	6th Panzer, 3rd Cavalry Brigade, 96th Infantry, 711th Infantry, 23rd Hungarian	6th Army	Army Group South
1945	12 April	23rd Panzer, 14th SS, 16th SS, 3rd Cavalry Brigade, 4th Cavalry Brigade, 44th Infantry	2nd Panzer Army	Army Group South
1945	7 May	23rd Panzer, 16th SS, 3rd Cavalry Brigade, 4th Cavalry Brigade	2nd Panzer Army	Oberbefehlshaber Südost

== Noteworthy individuals ==
- Gustav Harteneck, corps commander.

== See also ==
- 1st Cavalry Division
- 1st Cossack Cavalry Division
- XV SS Cossack Cavalry Corps
