= Hitzfeld =

Hitzfeld is a German surname. Notable people with the surname include:

- Ottmar Hitzfeld (born 1949), German footballer and manager
- Otto Hitzfeld (1898–1990), German officer in both World War I and World War II
