= General Hammer =

General Hammer may refer to:

- Ernst Hammer (1884–1957), German Wehrmacht lieutenant general
- Heathcote Hammer (1905–1961), Australian Army major general

== See also ==
- Julie Hammer (born 1955), Royal Australian Air Force vice-marshal
