= Hermann Hohn =

German general (1897–1968)

- Born: 11 October 1897; Renchen, German Empire
- Died: 13 November 1968 (aged 71); Ladenburg, West Germany
- Military career
- Allegiance: German Empire; Weimar Republic; Nazi Germany
- Branch: Army
- Rank: Generalleutnant
- Commands: 72nd Infantry Division; IX Army Corps
- Conflicts: World War II
- Awards: Knight's Cross of the Iron Cross with Oak Leaves and Swords
- Other work: Mayor of Ladenburg

Hermann Hohn (11 October 1897 – 13 November 1968) was a German general in the Wehrmacht of Nazi Germany during World War II, who commanded several divisions. He was a recipient of the Knight's Cross of the Iron Cross with Oak Leaves and Swords.

Hohn was released in 1948 and settled in Ladenburg. From 1953 to 1965 he was mayor of Ladenburg.

== Awards ==
- Iron Cross (1914) 2nd Class (31 October 1917) & 1st Class (March 1919)
- Iron Cross (1939) 2nd Class (26 June 1940) & 1st Class (23 July 1941)
- German Cross in Gold on 17 April 1943 as Oberst in Grenadier-Regiment 105
- Knight's Cross of the Iron Cross with Oak Leaves and Swords
  - Knight's Cross on 28 November 1943 as Oberst and deputy leader of the 72. Infanterie-Division
  - 410th Oak Leaves on 1 March 1944 as Oberst and leader of the 72. Infanterie-Division
  - 109th Swords on 31 October 1944 as Generalmajor and commander of the 72. Infanterie-Division

Military offices
Preceded by Generalleutnant Erwin Menny	Commander of 72. Infanterie-Division; 20 November 1943 – 25 March 1944	Succeeded by Generalmajor Karl Arning
Preceded by General der Kavallerie Gustav Harteneck	Commander of 72. Infanterie-Division; 1 July 1944 – 20 April 1945	Succeeded by Generalleutnant Hugo Beißwänger
Government offices
Preceded by Adam Herdt	Mayor of Ladenburg; 1953 – 1965	Succeeded by Reinhold Schulz
