= LXXVIII Army Corps =

Corps of the German army during WW II

The LXXVIII Army Corps for special deployment (German: LXXVIII. Armeekorps z. b. V.) was a short-lived army corps of the German Wehrmacht during World War II. It was formed in early March 1944 and dissolved just under three months later. Its personnel was used for the formation of the I Cavalry Corps.

== History ==
The LXXVIII Army Corps z. b. V. was formed on 6 March 1944 in Trautenau in Wehrkreis VIII. It was initially transferred to the 4th Romanian Army fighting in Bessarabia under the supervision of Army Group South Ukraine, but was called off to join the Replacement Army at Truppenübungsplatz Demba on 30 April 1944.

The LXXVIII Army Corps z. b. V. was dissolved on 25 May 1944 and its personnel largely used to form the I Cavalry Corps.

== Structure ==
Organizational structure of the LXXVIII (78th) Army Corps of the Wehrmacht
Date	Subordinate units	Army	Army Group	Operational area
15 April 1944	Various border regiments	4th Romanian Army	Army Group South Ukraine	Bessarabia
