= Gustav Harteneck =

- Born: 27 July 1892
- Died: 13 January 1984 (aged 91)
- Military career
- Allegiance: German Empire; Weimar Republic; Nazi Germany
- Branch: German Army
- Service years: 1914–1945
- Rank: General der Kavallerie
- Commands: 72nd Infantry Division; I Cavalry Corps
- Conflicts: World War I; World War II; Battle of France; Operation Barbarossa; Battle of Białystok–Minsk; Battle of Smolensk (1941); Battle of Moscow; Battles of Rzhev; Battle of Kursk; Battle of Smolensk (1943); Lublin–Brest Offensive; Operation Frühlingserwachen; Vienna Offensive
- Awards: Knight's Cross of the Iron Cross

Gustav Harteneck (27 July 1892 – 13 January 1984) was a German general in the Wehrmacht during World War II. He was a recipient of the Knight's Cross of the Iron Cross of Nazi Germany.

== Awards and decorations ==
- Knight's Cross of the Iron Cross on 21 September 1944 as General der Kavallerie and commander of I. Kavallerie-Korps

Military offices
Preceded by Generalmajor Karl Arning	Commander of 72. Infanterie-Division; 19 June 1944 - 1 July 1944	Succeeded by Generalleutnant Dr. Hermann Hohn
Preceded by Generalmajor Oswin Groling	Commander of I. Kavallerie-Korps; 22 June 1944 - 8 May 1945	Succeeded by None
