= 3rd Cavalry Brigade (Germany) =

- 3. Kavallerie-Brigade
- Active: 1944-1945
- Disbanded: 1945
- Country: Nazi Germany
- Branch: Wehrmacht
- Type: Cavalry
- Role: Reconnaissance, strategic reserve
- Engagements: Operation Spring Awakening

The 3rd Cavalry Brigade was a cavalry unit in the Wehrmacht from 1944 to 1945. Together with the 4th Cavalry Brigade, it formed the Harteneck Cavalry Corps. The 3rd and 4th Cavalry Brigades were formed from the Cavalry Regiments Center, North, and South, which had been attached to the GHQ of Army Groups Center, North, and South, respectively. It was the first independent cavalry formation in the Wehrmacht since the 1st Cavalry Division had been converted to the 24th Panzer Division in late 1941.

== Background ==
Following the end of the First World War, the newly created Reichswehr was permitted three cavalry divisions, consisting of eighteen cavalry regiments, according to the Treaty of Versailles. This was a significant decrease in cavalry strength compared to the eleven divisions used by the German Empire during the war. However, these three divisions, consisting of 16,400 soldiers, still formed a significant part of the Reichswehr, which was limited to 100,000 men. In addition, these cavalry divisions were the only truly mobile component of the Reichswehr, since motorization was severely limited by the Treaty of Versailles. In fact, the only armored vehicles, namely armored cars, permitted to the Reichswehr were contained in the cavalry divisions. However, after 1935, the newly created Heer, now freely ignoring the limitations of the Treaty of Versailles, began a gradual process of reorganization. As part of this process, the three cavalry divisions were disbanded, and most of the personnel of the constituent cavalry regiments were then reassigned to Panzer Divisions and the short-lived Light Divisions. The remaining thirteen cavalry regiments retained their horses and were seconded to infantry corps. These regiments were assigned to non-motorized infantry divisions and regiments, where they were formed into reconnaissance battalions and platoons, respectively. Only one cavalry unit existed beyond these reconnaissance units, the 1st East Prussian Cavalry Brigade, later expanded to a Division following its favorable performance in the Polish Campaign. The Division also saw action in France and the Low Countries before heading east as part of Operation Barbarossa.

== The Boeselager Cavalry Group and Cavalry Regiments Center, North, and South ==
Following the conversion of the 1st Cavalry Division to the 24th Panzer Division, the only cavalry units available to the Wehrmacht were the reconnaissance battalions and platoons in the non-motorized infantry divisions. However, there remained a pressing need for mobile troops, especially ones that did not suffer the same difficulties as motorized and mechanized forces on the Eastern Front. These forces often dealt with issues related to the availability of fuel, which became increasingly scarce as the war went on. This had the result of making motorized units increasingly scarce. In addition, the condition of roads in the Soviet Union were often unfavorable for wheeled and tracked vehicles. The favorable performance of cavalry units in the Waffen-SS in anti-partisan duties and the need for mobile troops uninhibited by unfavorable terrain prompted Philiip von Boeselager, a young officer on Field Marshal von Kluge's staff, to create a cavalry unit answering directly to Army Group Center in the spring of 1943. This was intended ostensibly as a strategic reserve and a quick reaction force which the Army Group could deploy as needed to contested areas. However, part of von Boeselager's plans for the group also included using it in Operation Valkyrie in case the assassination of Hitler succeeded. The cavalry group would rush to Berlin to secure it against Nazi loyalists until further troops could arrive from the Eastern Front. This plan was carried out after the July 20 Plot, but following the news that Hitler had indeed survived the assassination attempt, von Boeselager quickly returned with the group to the front, escaping suspicion. By mid 1943, following the favorable performance of von Boeselager's group on the front, Army Groups North and South followed suite in creating independent cavalry units answerable directly to the commanders of the Army Groups as army group-level assets. These groups were named Cavalry Regiments Center, North, and South.

== Reorganization as the 3rd and 4th Cavalry Regiments ==
Following the continued need for cavalry units, the three cavalry regiments of Army Groups North, South, and Center were reorganized into two cavalry brigades, the 3rd and the 4th. These two brigades, together with the 1st Hungarian Cavalry Division, formed the 1st Cavalry Corps.
