= Karl Arning =

German general

- Born: 10 February 1892
- Died: 17 November 1964 (aged 72)
- Military career
- Allegiance: Nazi Germany
- Branch: Army
- Service years: 1912–1920; 1934–1945
- Rank: Generalmajor
- Commands: 72nd Infantry Division; 75th Infantry Division
- Conflicts: Prague Offensive
- Awards: Knight's Cross of the Iron Cross

Karl Eduard Friedrich Arning (10 February 1892 – 17 November 1964) was a general in the Wehrmacht of Nazi Germany during World War II who commanded several divisions. He was a recipient of the Knight's Cross of the Iron Cross.

Arning surrendered to the Red Army troops in the course of the Soviet Prague Offensive in 1945. Convicted in the Soviet Union as a war criminal, he was held until 1955.

== Awards and decorations ==
- German Cross in Gold on 30 April 1943 as Oberst in Grenadier-Regiment 24
- Knight's Cross of the Iron Cross on 11 October 1943 as Oberst and commander of Grenadier-Regiment 24

Military offices
Preceded by Generalleutnant Dr. Hermann Hohn	Commander of 72. Infanterie-Division; 10 June 1944 – 19 June 1944	Succeeded by General der Kavallerie Gustav Harteneck
Preceded by Generalleutnant Helmuth Beukemann	Commander of 75. Infanterie-Division; 10 July 1944 – 6 April 1945	Succeeded by Generalmajor Lothar Berger
