= Erich Diestel =

German general (1892–1973)

- Born: 8 November 1892
- Died: 3 August 1973 (aged 80)
- Military career
- Allegiance: Nazi Germany
- Branch: Army
- Rank: Generalleutnant
- Commands: 101st Jäger Division; 75th Infantry Division; 346th Infantry Division; 331st Infantry Division; Korps Diestel
- Conflicts: World War II
- Awards: Knight's Cross of the Iron Cross

Erich Diestel (8 November 1892 – 3 August 1973) was a general in the Wehrmacht of Nazi Germany during World War II. He was a recipient of the Knight's Cross of the Iron Cross.

== Awards and decorations ==
- Knight's Cross of the Iron Cross on 8 October 1944 as Generalleutnant and commander of 346th Infantry Division

Military offices
Preceded by Generalleutnant Brauner von Haydringen	Commander of 101st Jäger Division; 11 April 1942 – 1 September 1942	Succeeded by General der Gebirgstruppen Emil Vogel
Preceded by Generalleutnant Ernst Hammer	Commander of 75th Infantry Division; 5 September 1942 – 15 September 1942	Succeeded by Generalleutnant Helmuth Beukemann
Preceded by None	Commander of 346th Infantry Division; 20 September 1942 – 16 October 1944	Succeeded by Generalleutnant Walter Steinmüller
