= 190th Infantry Division (Wehrmacht) =

Military unit

The 190th Infantry Division (German: 190. Infanterie-Division), initially known as Division No. 190 (German: Division Nr. 190), was an infantry division of the German Heer during World War II.

== History ==
On 15 May 1940, the Replacement Division Hamburg (German: Ersatz-Division Hamburg) was formed to organize the parts of Division No. 160 that stayed behind in Wehrkreis X in Germany as most of the 160th was moved to occupied Denmark. The Replacement Division Hamburg was renamed to become Division No. 190 on 10 June 1940. The initial commander, appointed on 17 May 1940, was Kurt Wolff.

=== Division No. 190 ===
In June 1940, Division No. 190 consisted of the following elements:

- Infantry Replacement Regiment (mot.) 20. (Note: Battalions: 69, 76, 90, 376.) Hamburg-Wandsbek.
- Infantry Replacement Regiment 30. (Note: Battalions: 6, 46, 469.) Lübeck.
- Infantry Replacement Regiment 225. (Note: Battalions: 333, 490.) Flensburg.
- Artillery Replacement Regiment 20. (Note: Detachments: 20, 30, 58, 225, 290.) Rendsburg.
- Engineer Replacement Battalion 20. Hamburg-Harburg.
- Engineer Replacement Battalion 30. Lübeck.
- Fahr Replacement Detachment 10. Neumünster.
- Kraftfahr Replacement Detachment 10. Hamburg-Alsterdorf.
- Construction Replacement Battalion 10. Hamburg-Harburg.

On 15 October 1940, the divisional staff headquarters were deployed to Neumünster. On 1 December 1941, having passed th 225th Regiment to the 160th Division, Division No. 190 consisted of the following elements:

- Infantry Replacement Regiment (mot.) 20. (Note: Battalions: 46, 76, 90.) Hamburg-Wandsbek.
- Infantry Replacement Regiment 30. (Note: Battalions: 6, 469, 490.) Lübeck.
- Artillery Replacement Regiment 20. (Note: Detachments: 20, 30, 225, 290.) Rendsburg.
- Panzerjäger Replacement Detachment 20. Hamburg-Harburg.
- Auxiliary Flak Artillery Replacement Detachment 280. Itzehoe.
- Engineer Replacement Battalion 20. Hamburg-Harburg.
- Engineer Replacement Battalion 30. Lübeck.
- Fahr Replacement Detachment 10. Neumünster.
- Kraftfahr Replacement Detachment 10. Hamburg-Alsterdorf.

On 15 April 1942, Wolff was replaced as divisional commander by Emil Markgraf. Markgraf was then replaced by Justin von Obernitz on 22 June 1942, who was in turn replaced by Albert Newiger on 1 November 1942. Also on 1 November 1942, as part of the reorganization of the Replacement Army, the replacement battalions of the 160th Division were formed into the 520th Regiment and transferred to Division No. 190. Newiger was replaced as divisional commander by Ernst Hammer on 10 November 1942. Hammer would command the 190th Division until the end of the war.

On 1 April 1943, the 20th Motorized Regiment was taken out of Division No. 190 and put directly under the supervision of the Wehrkreis as Commander of Panzer Troops X.

In December 1943, Division No. 190 consisted of the following elements:

- Grenadier Replacement Regiment 30. (Note: Battalions: 6, 46, 490.) Lübeck.
- Grenadier Replacement Regiment 520. (Note: Battalions: 26, 209, 220, 333, 376, 377, 469.) Schleswig.
- Artillery Replacement Regiment 225. (Note: Detachments: 30, 58, 290.) Itzehoe.
- Engineer Replacement and Training Battalion 20. Hamburg-Harburg.
- Engineer Replacement and Training Battalion 30. Lübeck.
- Fahr Replacement and Training Detachment 10. Neumünster.
- Kraftfahr Replacement Detachment 10. Hamburg-Alsterdorf
- Kraftfahr Training Detachment 10. Wentorf.

In response to the British paratrooper landings near Arnhem that were part of the Allied Operation Market Garden, the codeword "Alarm Küste" was given out to all replacement units of Wehrkreis X, including Division No. 190 on 18 September 1944. These forces were hurriedly deployed to the Netherlands for combat. The combat strength of the division, which had been reinforced by the Commander of Panzer Troops X, was as follows, for a total of 9607 personnel:

- Divisional HQ: 190 personnel.
- Commander of Panzer Troops X, with Grenadier Replacement and Training Battalions 76 and 90, as well as Field Replacement Battalion 90: 1960 personnel.
- Grenadier Replacement Regiment 30, with Grenadier Replacement and Training Battalions 6 and 46, as well as Grenadier Replacement Battalion 469: 2105 personnel.
- Grenadier Replacement Regiment 520, with Grenadier Replacement Battalions 26 and 376: 2235 personnel.
- Artillery Replacement and Training Regiment (mot.) 225, with Artillery Replacement and Training Detachments 30 and 58: 980 personnel.
- Panzerjäger Replacement and Training Detachment 20: 674 personnel.
- Engineer Replacement and Training Battalions 20: 785 personnel.
- Supply Troops 180: 645 personnel.

Near Nijmegen, Division No. 190 clashed with Allied forces including the American 82nd Airborne Division.

=== 190th Infantry Division ===
On 4 November 1944, Division No. 190 was restructured into the 190th Infantry Division. Its divisional structure was as follows, with each of the three Grenadier Regiments consisting of two battalions each:

- Grenadier Regiment 1224.
- Grenadier Regiment 1225.
- Grenadier Regiment 1226.
- Division Fusilier Battalion 190.
- Panzerjäger Detachment 1190 (later Panzerjäger Detachment 190).
- Artillery Regiment 890.
- Intelligence Detachment 1190.
- Engineer Battalion 1190.
- Field Replacement Battalion 1190.
- Supply Troops 1190.

This promotion made the 190th Infantry Division one of the few units to be restructured directly from a replacement division into a full infantry division, whereas most comparable formations first had to go through the stage of reserve divisions.

In March 1945, the division's strength was refreshed in the Hilversum-Utrecht area. Following an order on 4 April 1945, the division was dissolved and most of its soldiers used to reinforce the newly formed Infantry Division Ulrich von Hutten. The divisional staff of the 190th Division continued to exist until 13 April 1945, when the division's commanding general, Ernst Hammer, was captured in the Ruhr Pocket.

== Noteworthy individuals ==
- Kurt Wolff, divisional commander starting 17 May 1940.
- Emil Markgraf, divisional commander starting 15 April 1942.
- Justin von Obernitz, divisional commander starting 22 June 1942.
- Albert Newiger, divisional commander starting 1 November 1942.
- Ernst Hammer, divisional commander starting 10 November 1942.
