= Lothar Berger =

German general (1900–1971)

- Born: 31 December 1900; Halberstadt
- Died: 5 November 1971 (aged 70); Bad Schwartau
- Military career
- Allegiance: German Empire; Weimar Republic; Nazi Germany
- Branch: Army
- Service years: 1918–1920; 1924–1945
- Rank: Generalmajor
- Commands: 75th Infantry Division
- Conflicts: World War I World War II
- Awards: Knight's Cross of the Iron Cross with Oak Leaves

Lothar Berger (31 December 1900 – 5 November 1971) was a German general (Generalmajor) in the Wehrmacht during World War II who commanded the 75th Infantry Division. He was a recipient of the Knight's Cross of the Iron Cross with Oak Leaves. Berger initially surrendered to the Soviet forces in May 1945, but was transferred to British custody and was released in 1946.

== Awards and decorations ==
- Iron Cross (1914) 2nd Class (28 July 1918) & 1st Class (24 September 1920)
- Clasp to the Iron Cross (1939) 2nd Class (30 September 1939) & 1st Class (2 October 1939)
- Knight's Cross of the Iron Cross with Oak Leaves
  - Knight's Cross on 5 August 1940 as Major and commander of III. / Infanterie-Regiment 84
  - 806th Oak Leaves on 28 March 1945 as Oberst and commander of Brigade z.b.V.100 / XXXX.Panzer-Korps

Military offices
Preceded by Generalmajor Karl Arning	Commander of 75. Infanterie-Division; 6 April 1945 – May 1945	Succeeded by Oberst Gerhard Matthaiss
