= Ernst Hammer =

Dipl.-Ing. Ernst Hammer
- Born: 20 October 1884; Falkenau an der Eger, Egerland, Austria-Hungary
- Died: 2 December 1957 (aged 73); Vienna, Austria
- Military career
- Allegiance: Austria-Hungary (to 1918); Austrian Republic (to 1938); Nazi Germany
- Branch: Army
- Service years: 1903–1945
- Rank: Generalleutnant
- Commands: 75. Infanterie-Division; Division Nr. 190; 190. Infanterie-Division
- Conflicts: World War I; World War II; Battle of France; Operation Barbarossa; Battle of Kiev; Battle of Voronezh; Operation Market Garden; Battle of the Reichswald; Operation Varsity
- Awards: Knight's Cross of the Iron Cross

Ernst Hammer (20 October 1884 – 2 December 1957) was a German-Austrian officer of four armies since 1 October 1903, entering as a one-year volunteer. He was Oberleutnant of the Common Army, Hauptmann of the k.u.k. Armee, Generalmajor of the Bundesheer (transferred to the German Army 15 March 1938), Generalleutnant of the Wehrmacht during World War II. He was a recipient of the Knight's Cross of the Iron Cross. As commander of the 75th Infantry Division, he ordered his soldiers to shoot female Soviet POWs on the spot.

== Awards and decorations ==
- Military Merit Cross, 3rd Class with War Decoration and Swords (Austria-Hungary, World War I)
- Military Merit Medal, in Silver and in Bronze (Austria-Hungary, World War I)
- Karl Troop Cross (World War I)
- Gallipoli Star (World War I)
- Austrian War Commemorative Medal
- Hungarian War Commemorative Medal
- Honour Cross of the World War 1914/1918
- Iron Cross (1914)
  - 2nd Class
  - 1st Class
- Clasps to the Iron Cross
  - 2nd Class
  - 1st Class
- Eastern Front Medal
- Knight's Cross of the Iron Cross on 20 December 1941 as Generalleutnant and commander of 75. Infanterie-Division

Military offices
Preceded by None	Commander of 75. Infanterie-Division; 1 September 1939 - 5 September 1942	Succeeded by Generalleutnant Erich Diestel
Preceded by Generalmajor Albert Newiger	Commander of Division Nr. 190; 10 November 1942 - 4 November 1944	Succeeded by Renamed 190. Infanterie-Division
Preceded by Previously Division Nr. 190	Commander of 190. Infanterie-Division; 4 November 1944 - 13 April 1945	Succeeded by None
