= Helmut Beck-Broichsitter =

- Born: 30 August 1914; Kiel
- Died: 25 September 2000 (aged 86)
- Political party: Nazi Party; Socialist Reich Party
- Awards: Knight's Cross of the Iron Cross

Helmut Beck-Broichsitter (30 August 1914 – 25 September 2000) was a German Wehrmacht officer during World War II. Following the war, Beck-Broichsitter was involved in several neo-Nazi movements.

== Career ==
Beck-Broichsitter became a member of the Nazi Party in 1931, of the Sturmabteilung in 1932 and of the police in 1939. He joined the army and became an officer in the Grossdeutchland Regiment and was awarded the Knights Cross of the Iron Cross for his service as a company commander in the French campaign

After the war Beck-Broichsitter founded the "Bruderschaft" (Fraternity) in 1949 of former officers of the Wehrmacht and his emphasis was on opposing Bolshevism. Accused of spying for the Federal Office for the Protection of the Constitution, he resigned from the leadership. In 1951, Beck-Broichsitter helped found the Freikorps Deutschland, a Neo-Nazi paramilitary. The organization managed to train roughly 2,000 men, but was unable to obtain weapons to overthrow the government. On 10 February 1953, the West German government banned the Freikorps Deutschland and had four of its leaders, including Beck-Broichsitter, arrested for plotting against the government. Beck-Broichsitter was released from custody the following month, and the charges against him were later dropped. He went on to join the openly Nazi-orientated Socialist Reich Party.

== Awards ==
- Knight's Cross of the Iron Cross on 4 September 1940 as Oberleutnant and Chef of 14.(Panzer-Jäger)/Infanterie-Regiment "Großdeutschland"
