= 75th Infantry Division (Wehrmacht) =

- German: 75. Infanterie-Division
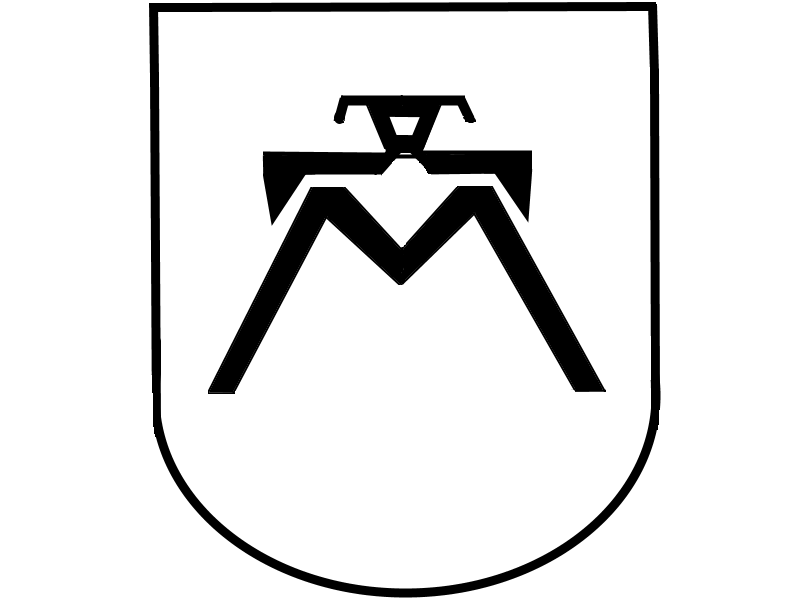
- 75. Infanterie Division Vehicle Insignia
- Active: 26 August 1939 – 8 May 1945
- Country: Nazi Germany
- Branch: Heer ( Wehrmacht)
- Type: Infantry
- Size: Division
- Engagements: Battle of France; Operation Barbarossa; Battle of Kiev (1941); Battle of Kursk; Lower Dnieper Offensive; Kamenets-Podolsky pocket Battle of the Dukla Pass; Upper Silesian Offensive; Prague Offensive

Commanders
- Notable commanders: Helmuth Beukemann

The 75th Infantry Division (German: 75. Infanterie-Division) was a German infantry division in World War II. It was formed on 26 August 1939.

== Service history ==
The 75th Infantry Division was formed on 26 August 1939 as a division of the second Aufstellungswelle in Wehrkreis II using personnel of the 12th Infantry Division (also headquartered at Wehrkreis II) to form three infantry regiments and an artillery regiment. These regiments were the Infantry Regiments 172 (Neustrelitz), 202 (Rostock), and 222 (Schwerin), and the Artillery Regiment 175 (Ludwigslust), as well as the Division Units 175 for divisional support.

On 31 January 1940, the battalion II./172 was transferred to the 292nd Infantry Division as II./508. A third of the division (Staff/222, I./172, I./202, I./222) was transferred away on 8 October 1940 and reassigned to the 302nd Infantry Division. These transfers were subsequently replenished.

The 75th Infantry Division participated in the Massacre at Babi Yar (29–30 September 1941).

After an OKH directive of 15 October 1942, all infantry regiments were redesignated "Grenadier Regiment", though regiments in the tradition of certain previous German military units could instead petition to be called "Rifle Regiment" or "Fusilier Regiment". In the case of the 75th Infantry Division, this resulted in the Grenadier Regiments 172 and 222 and, after 11 June 1943, the Fusilier Regiment 202.

Following a directive of 2 October 1943, divisions on the Eastern Front were reformed to become Division neuer Art organization-style divisions. The battalions I./272, II./202 and II./222 were dissolved and replaced by their regiments' respective third battalions. The Bicycle Detachment 175, which had been added to the division on 7 June 1942, became the Division Fusilier Battalion 75.

On 1 January 1945, the 75th Infantry Division (then a part of Army Group Heinrici (Gotthard Heinrici) under Army Group A) had a strength of 8,441 men.

In March to April 1945, the division was smashed in the Mährisch-Ostrau sector and its remnants absorbed by other forces.

== Superior formations ==
Superior formations of the 75th Infantry Division
Year	Month	Army Corps	Army	Army Group	Area of operations
1939	Sep.	Army reserves	1st Army	Army Group C	Saar Palatinate
1939	Oct.	XXIV Army Corps	1st Army	Army Group C	Saar Palatinate
1939	Dec.	XII Army Corps	1st Army	Army Group C	Saar Palatinate
1940	Jan.–Jul.	XII Army Corps	1st Army	Army Group C	Saar Palatinate
1940	Jul.–Aug.	III Army Corps	18th Army	None	German-occupied Poland
1940	Sep.–Dec.	III Army Corps	12th Army	Army Group B	German-occupied Poland
1941	Jan.–Apr.	III Army Corps	17th Army	Army Group B	German-occupied Poland
1941	May	III Army Corps	6th Army	Army Group A	German-occupied Poland
1941	Jun.–Aug.	LV Army Corps	6th Army	Army Group South	Kholm, Kyiv
1941	Sep.–Dec.	XXIX Army Corps	6th Army	Army Group South	Kyiv, Belgorod
1942	Jan.–Jul.	XXIX Army Corps	6th Army	Army Group South	Belgorod
1942	Aug.	Army group reserves	6th Army	Army Group South	Belgorod
1942	Sep.–Dec.	VII Army Corps	2nd Army	Army Group South	Voronezh
1943	Jan.–Feb.	VII Army Corps	2nd Army	Army Group South	Voronezh
1943	Mar.–Jul.	VII Army Corps	2nd Army	Army Group Center	Sumy
1943	Aug.–Dec.	VII Army Corps	4th Panzer Army	Army Group South	Belgorod, Kyiv, Zhytomir
1944	Jan.	VII Army Corps	4th Panzer Army	Army Group South	Vinnytsia
1944	Feb.	VII Army Corps	1st Panzer Army	Army Group South	Cherkassy
1944	Mar.	VII Army Corps	8th Army	Army Group South	Cherkassy
1944	Apr.	XXXXVI Panzer Corps	1st Panzer Army	Army Group North Ukraine	Brody
1944	May–Jul.	XXIV Army Corps	1st Panzer Army	Army Group North Ukraine	Brody
1944	Aug.	XI Army Corps	1st Panzer Army	Army Group North Ukraine	Carpathian mountains
1944	Sep.	XXIV Army Corps	1st Panzer Army	Army Group North Ukraine	Carpathian mountains
1944	Oct.	XXIV Army Corps	1st Panzer Army	Army Group A	Beskid mountains
1944	Nov.–Dec.	XI Army Corps	1st Panzer Army	Army Group A	Beskid mountains
1945	Jan.	XI Army Corps	1st Panzer Army	Army Group A	Beskid mountains
1945	Feb.–Mar.	LIX Army Corps	1st Panzer Army	Army Group Center	Upper Silesia
1945	Apr.	Army reserves	1st Panzer Army	Army Group Center	Mährisch-Ostrau

== Commanders ==
- Ernst Hammer, 26 August 1939 – 5 September 1942
- Erich Diestel, 5 September 1942 – 12 September 1942
- Helmuth Beukemann, 15 September 1942 – 9 July 1944
- Karl Arning, 10 July 1944 – 5 April 1945
- Lothar Berger, 6 April 1945 – May 1945
- Gerhard Matthaiss, May 1945 – 8 May 1945
