= Helmuth Beukemann =

German general (1894–1981)

- Born: 9 May 1894; Hamburg
- Died: 13 July 1981 (aged 87); Hamburg
- Military career
- Allegiance: Nazi Germany
- Branch: Army (Wehrmacht)
- Rank: Generalleutnant
- Unit: 164th Infantry Division
- Commands: 75th Infantry Division
- Conflicts: World War II
- Awards: Knight's Cross of the Iron Cross

Wilhelm Berthold Helmuth Beukemann (9 May 1894 – 13 July 1981) was a general in the Wehrmacht of Nazi Germany during World War II. He was a recipient of the Knight's Cross of the Iron Cross.

== Awards and decorations ==
- Iron Cross (1914) 2nd Class (9 September 1914) and 1st Class (23 May 1916)
- Brunswick War Merit Cross 2nd Class (24 June 1915) and 1st Class (21 May 1918)
  - Bewährungsabzeichen (probation badge) to the War Merit Cross 2nd Class (18 June 1918)
- Wound Badge in Black (17 August 1918)
- Hanseatic Cross of Hamburg (16 May 1916)
- Knight's Cross of the Royal House Order of Hohenzollern with Swords (24 October 1918)
- Clasp to the Iron Cross (1939) 2nd Class (21 September 1939) and 1st Class (15 October 1939)
- Anerkennungsurkunde des Oberbefehlshabers des Heeres (1 May 1941)
- Knight's Cross of the Iron Cross on 14 May 1941 as Oberst and commander of Infanterie-Regiment 382
- German Cross in Gold on 20 January 1944 as Generalleutnant and commander of the 75. Infanterie-Division

Military offices
Preceded by Generalleutnant Erich Diestel	Commander of 75. Infanterie-Division; 15 September 1942 – 10 July 1944	Succeeded by Generalmajor Karl Arning
