= 558th Volksgrenadier Division =

German Army infantry division in World War II

The 558th Volksgrenadier Division (German: 558. Volksgrenadier-Division) was a volksgrenadier infantry division of the German Army during World War II, active from 1944 to 1945.

The division was established on 11 July 1944 at the Grafenwöhr military training area in Wehrkreis XIII in Nürnberg under the designation Sperr-Division 558. On 17 July 1944, the division was renamed as the 558. Grenadier Division.

In August and September 1944 the unit fought against the Red Army in Lithuania and in the Suwałki area in Poland. On October 9, 1944, the division was renamed the 558th Volksgrenadier Division. This unit fought in East Prussia and in the Heiligenbeil Pocket. The remnants of the unit went into Soviet captivity near Pillau.

Its commanders were :

- Generalleutnant Arthur Kullmer (15 July 1944 - 5 April 1945)
- Generalleutnant Werner von Bercken (5 April 1945 - 28 April 1945)

== Sources ==
- 558. Grenadier-Division
- 558. Volks-Grenadier-Division
