= Werner von Bercken =

German general (1897–1976)

- Born: 8 February 1897
- Died: 29 February 1976 (aged 79)
- Military career
- Allegiance: Nazi Germany
- Branch: Army (Wehrmacht)
- Rank: Generalleutnant
- Commands: 102nd Infantry Division; 558th Volksgrenadier Division
- Conflicts: World War I World War II
- Awards: Knight's Cross of the Iron Cross

Werner von Bercken (8 February 1897 – 29 February 1976) was a general in the Wehrmacht of Nazi Germany during World War II who commanded several divisions. He was a recipient of the Knight's Cross of the Iron Cross. Bercken surrendered to the Red Army on 28 April 1945 in the Vistula Spit. Convicted as a war criminal in the Soviet Union, he was held until 10 October 1955.

== Awards and decorations ==
- Iron Cross (1914) 2nd Class (12 March 1915) & 1st Class (7 November 1916)
- Wound Badge (1914) in White (29 December 1918)
- Honour Cross of the World War 1914/1918 (1 January 1935)
- Wehrmacht Long Service Award 2nd Class (2 October 1936)
- Clasp to the Iron Cross (1939) 2nd Class (24 October 1939) & 1st Class (25 June 1941)
- Eastern Front Medal (4 August 1942)
- German Cross in Gold on 1 June 1944 as Generalmajor and commander of 102. Infanterie-Division
- Knight's Cross of the Iron Cross on 23 October 1944 as Generalleutnant and commander of 102. Infanterie-Division

Military offices
Preceded by General der Infanterie Otto Hitzfeld	Commander of 102. Infanterie-Division; 5 November 1943 – March 1945	Succeeded by Oberst Ludwig
