= Aufklärungsgruppe 121 =

Reconnaissance Group 121
- Aufklärungsgruppe 121
- Disbanded: 1945
- Country: Nazi Germany
- Branch: Luftwaffe
- Role: Reconnaissance
- Garrison/HQ: Prenzlau

Aircraft flown
- Reconnaissance: Junkers Ju 88

Aufklärungsgruppe 121 (121st Reconnaissance Group) was a German Air Force reconnaissance group that participated in the Axis-led invasion of Yugoslavia during World War II.

The group consisted of four Staffeln (squadron):

- 1.(F)/121
- 2.(F)/121
- 3.(F)/121
- 4.(F)/121
