= Otto Hitzfeld =

German general (1898–1990)

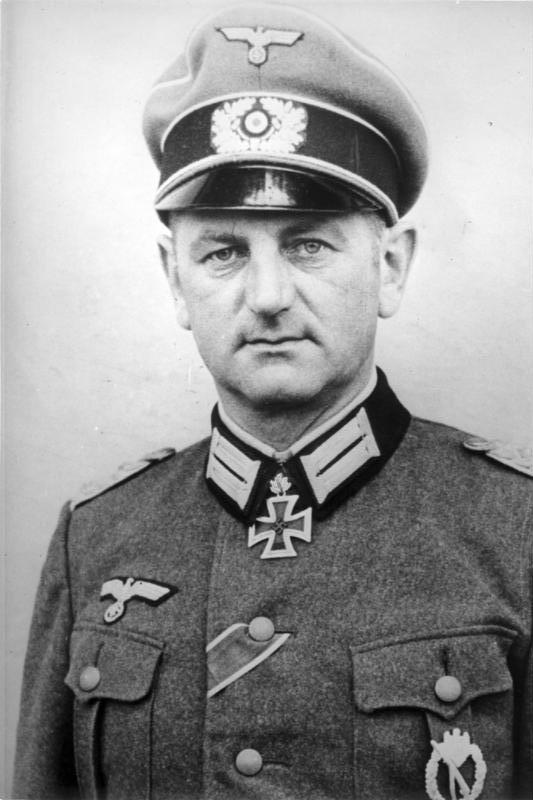
- Hitzfeld in 1942
- Born: Otto Maximilian Hitzfeld; 7 May 1898; Schluchsee, German Empire
- Died: 6 December 1990 (aged 92); Dossenheim, Germany
- Military career
- Allegiance: German Empire; Weimar Republic; Nazi Germany
- Branch: German Army
- Service years: 1914–1945
- Rank: General der Infanterie
- Commands: 102nd Infantry Division; LXVII Army Corps; 11th Army
- Conflicts: World War I World War II
- Awards: Knight's Cross of the Iron Cross with Oak Leaves and Swords

Otto Maximilian Hitzfeld (7 May 1898 – 6 December 1990) was a German general during World War II. He was listed as a recipient of the Knight’s Cross with Oak Leaves and Swords by the West German Association of Knight's Cross Recipients. He is the uncle of retired football manager Ottmar Hitzfeld.

== Career ==
Hitzfeld received command of the 102nd Infantry Division in April 1943. He was promoted to Generalleutnant early November 1943 and had to turn over command of the Division. He then took command of the infantry school in Döberitz and again turned over command on 1 November 1944. Hitzfeld was given command of the LXVII Army Corps, which he led in the Battle of the Bulge. He was promoted to General of the Infantry on 1 March 1945 and made commanding general of the LXVII Army Corps.

He became commander of the 11th Army in April 1945. He declared Göttingen, which was crowded with refugees, as an open city. He was taken prisoner of war by American forces on 19 April 1945 from which he was released on 12 May 1947. He received news that he had been awarded the Knight's Cross of the Iron Cross with Oak Leaves and Swords after his release from captivity.

== Awards ==
- Iron Cross (1914) 2nd Class (5 November 1915 & 1st Class (5 September 1916))
- Clasp to the Iron Cross (1939) 2nd Class (25 August 1940) & 1st Class (15 August 1941)
- Officers Cross of the Order of the Crown with Swords (22 June 1942)
- Knight's Cross of the Iron Cross with Oak Leaves and Swords
  - Knight's Cross on 30 October 1941 as Oberstleutnant and commander of Infanterie-Regiment 213
  - 65th Oak Leaves on 17 January 1942 as Oberstleutnant and commander of Infanterie-Regiment 213
  - 158th Swords on 9 May 1945 as General der Infanterie and commanding general of the LXVII. Armeekorps (Note: Otto Hitzfeld's nomination was rejected by Major Joachim Domaschk on 30 April 1945 and commented: "This is not a nomination!" (Only leadership and organisational achievements, no personal bravery) he additionally noted: "missing in cauldron AOK 11". The nomination was thus assessed as insufficient as well as postponed according to AHA 44 Ziff. 572. The entry date noted on the nomination list for the higher grades of the Knight's Cross of the Iron Cross is 28 April 1945. The list indicates a note "deferred". The approval cannot be proven. The order commission of the Association of Knight's Cross Recipients (AKCR) handled the case in 1981 and decided: Swords yes, 9 May 1945. The AKCR claims that the award was presented in accordance with the Dönitz-decree. This is illegal according to the Deutsche Dienststelle (WASt) and lacks legal justification. The sequential number "158" and presentation date was assigned by the AKCR. Hitzfeld was member of the AKCR.)

== Notes ==
Military offices
Preceded by Generalmajor Johannes Friessner	Commander of 102. Infanterie-Division; 19 January 1943 – 5 November 1943	Succeeded by Generalleutnant Werner von Bercken
Preceded by General der Artillerie Walther Lucht	Commander of 11. Armee; 2 April 1945 – 8 April 1945	Succeeded by General der Artillerie Walther Lucht
