= 72nd Infantry Division (Wehrmacht) =

- 72. Infanterie-Division
- Divisional insignia
- Active: 19 September 1939 – 8 May 1945
- Country: Nazi Germany
- Branch: Army
- Type: Infantry
- Size: Division
- Nickname: Yellow Cross
- Engagements: World War II: Battle of France; Eastern Front (World War II)

The 72nd Infantry Division (German: 72. Infanterie-Division) was formed on 19 September 1939 in Trier from Grenz-Division Trier, a border security unit.

It was later refitted in Poland in March 1944 as part of the 24th wave (Aufstellungswelle).

On 1 January 1945, the division, then under command of the 4th Panzer Army of Army Group A, had a strength of 10,493 men.

The division surrendered to the Red Army in May 1945, after which Generalmajor Karl Arning was convicted of war crimes in the Soviet Union.

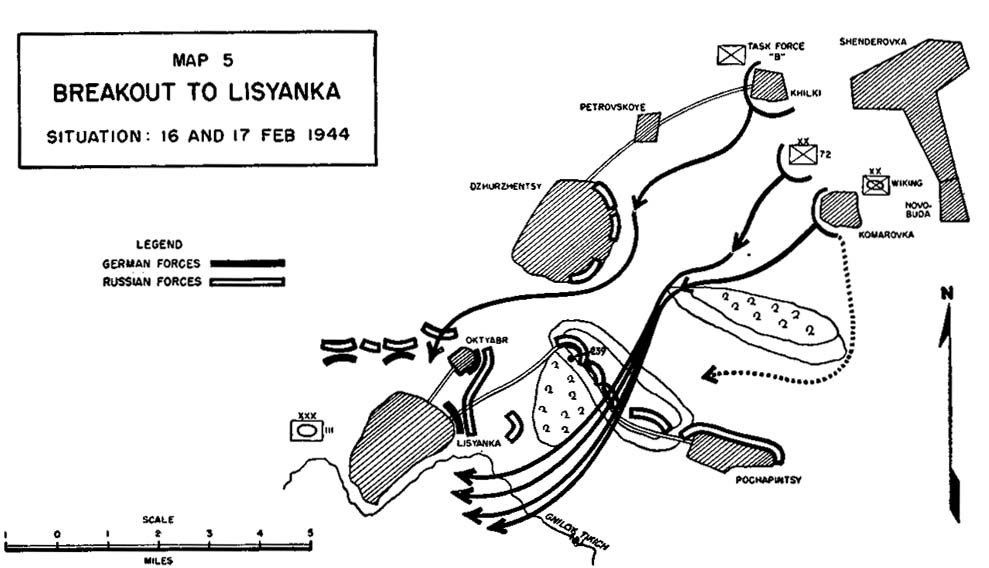
Breakout to Lisyanka.

== Commanding officers ==
- General der Infanterie Franz Mattenklott (19 September 1939 – 25 July 1940)
- General der Infanterie Helge Auleb (25 July 1940 – 4 September 1940)
- General der Infanterie Franz Mattenklott (4 September 1940 – 6 November 1940)
- Generalleutnant Philipp Müller-Gebhard (6 November 1940 – 10 July 1942)
- Generalmajor Curt Souchay (10 July 1942 – 24 November 1942)
- Generalleutnant Philipp Müller-Gebhard (24 November 1942 – 17 February 1943)
- Generalleutnant Ralph Graf von d'Oriola (17 February 1943 – 3 May 1943)
- Generalleutnant Philipp Müller-Gebhard (3 May 1943 – 1 November 1943)
- Generalleutnant Erwin Menny (1 November 1943 – 20 November 1943)
- Generalleutnant Dr. Hermann Hohn (20 November 1943 – 25 March 1944)
- Generalmajor Karl Arning (10 June 1944 – 19 June 1944)
- General der Kavallerie Gustav Harteneck (19 June 1944 – 1 July 1944)
- Generalleutnant Dr. Hermann Hohn (1 July 1944 – 20 April 1945)
- Generalleutnant Hugo Beißwänger (20 April 1945 – 8 May 1945)

== See also ==
- List of German divisions in World War II
