= 102nd Infantry Division (Wehrmacht) =

- 102. Infanterie-Division
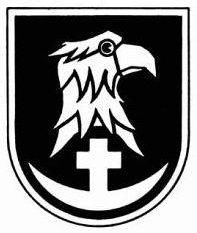
- Divisional insignia
- Active: 15 December 1940 – 1945
- Country: Nazi Germany
- Branch: Army
- Type: Infantry
- Size: Division
- Garrison/HQ: Casel
- Engagements: World War II: Operation Mars; Operation Citadel; Operation Bagration; East Prussian Offensive; Heiligenbeil pocket

Commanders
- Notable commanders: Johannes Frießner; Otto Hitzfeld; Werner von Bercken

The 102nd Infantry Division was a German military infantry division during World War II. It served on the Eastern Front, fighting in the Rzhev salient and the Battle of Kursk. It was destroyed during the latter stages of the Soviet Red Army's East Prussian Offensive in 1945.

== Organisation and history ==
The division was formed on 15 December 1940 in Wehrkreis II (Mecklenburg/Pomerania), in the 12th mobilisation wave, using elements of the 8th Infantry Division and the 28th Infantry Division. The division fought on the Eastern Front, for much of its existence it was part of the Ninth Army assigned to Army Group Centre.

On 25 November 1942 the Soviets simultaneously launched attacks against the eastern, western and northern flanks of the German Rzhev salient, known as Operation Mars. North of the Osuga River, the 102nd successfully repelled repeated assaults by 20,000 infantry and over 100 tanks of three Soviet 31st Army divisions (The 31st Army led its attack with the 88th, 336th, and 239th Rifle Divisions, supported by the 332d and 145th Tank Brigades). Soviet infantry clad in winter white advanced in echelon, their ranks interspersed with supporting tanks. German artillery, machine guns, and small arms fire tore gaping holes in the ranks of the assaulting infantry as antitank weapons picked off the accompanying tanks. For three days and at a cost of more than half of their riflemen and most of their tanks, the Soviets hurled themselves in vain at the 102nd Division's prepared defenses. Faced with this determined resistance, the 31st Army's assault collapsed, and, despite Zhukov's and Konev's exhortations, it could not be revived. In 1943 it was involved in Operation Citadel (the Battle of Kursk) and its aftermath, losing much of its strength in a series of fierce defensive battles around Orel; by October it was listed as assigned to the Second Army and reduced to Kampfgruppe level. In January 1944, the division was assigned to the Ninth Army, covering its southern flank in the Pripet Marshes. It avoided the disastrous encirclement and destruction of much of the Ninth Army around Bobruisk in late June during the Soviet Operation Bagration, and was then assigned back to the Second Army, holding a line of defence along the River Narew.

The Soviet army's East Prussian Offensive, from 13 January 1945 onwards, broke the under-strength division, which was pushed north and trapped in the Heiligenbeil pocket, being reassigned to the Fourth Army. In February it held the perimeter near Mehlsack, before being assigned to defend Braunsberg until it fell on 20 March. A few troops broke through westwards and eventually surrendered to the Americans in Schleswig-Holstein: the other encircled divisional elements in the kessel (cauldron) were eventually taken over by the 28th Jäger Division, being involved in the final defence of the Kahlholzer Haken peninsula at Balga.

== Organization ==
Structure of the division:

- Hauptquartier (Headquarters) - Wehrkreis VIII - Casel
- 232. Infanterieregiment (232nd Infantry Regiment)
  - 1. Battalion (1st Battalion)
  - 2. Battalion (2nd Battalion)
  - 3. Battalion (3rd Battalion)
- 233. Infanterieregiment (233rd Infantry Regiment)
  - 1. Battalion (1st Battalion)
  - 2. Battalion (2nd Battalion)
  - 3. Battalion (3rd Battalion)
- 235. Infanterieregiment (235th Infantry Regiment)
  - 1. Battalion (1st Battalion)
  - 2. Battalion (2nd Battalion)
  - 3. Battalion (3rd Battalion)
- 104. Artillerieregiment (104th Artillery Regiment)
  - 1. Battalion (1st Battalion)
  - 2. Battalion (2nd Battalion)
  - 3. Battalion (3rd Battalion)
  - 4. Battalion (4th Battalion)
- 102. Aufklärung Battalion (102nd Reconnaissance Battalion)
- 102. Panzer-Zerstörer-Bataillon (102nd Tank Destroyer Battalion)
- 102. Ingenieur-Bataillon (102nd Engineer Battalion)
- 102. Signal-Bataillon (102nd Signal Battalion)
- 102. Divisions-Versorgungsgruppe (102nd Divisional Supply Group)

== Commanders ==
- Lieutenant-General John Ansat (10 December 1940 – 1 February 1942)
- Lieutenant-General Albrecht Baier (1 February 1942 – 10 March 1942)
- Major-General Werner von Räsfeld (10 March 1942 – 1 May 1942)
- Colonel-General Johannes Frießner (1 May 1942 – 19 January 1943)
- General Otto Hitzfeld (19 January 1943 – 5 November 1943)
- Lieutenant-General Werner von Bercken (5 November 1943 – March 1945)
