= 298th Division =

298th Division may refer to:

- 298th Infantry Division, Wehrmacht, Germany
- 298th Rifle Division, Soviet Union

== See also ==
- List of military divisions by number
