= Battle of Białystok–Minsk =

Strategic operation conducted during Operation Barbarossa

- Part of Operation Barbarossa during the Eastern Front of World War II
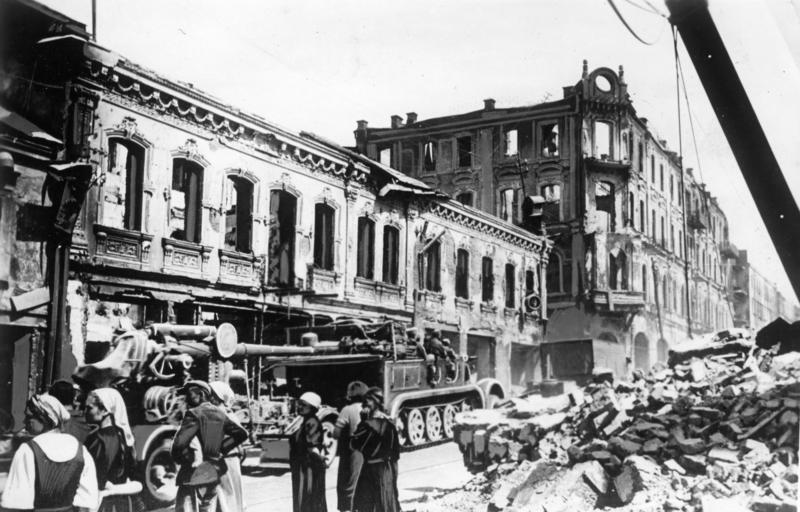
- German armored vehicles drive through the ruins of Minsk, July 1941
Date	22 June – 9 July 1941
Location	Byelorussian Soviet Socialist Republic, Soviet Union
Result	German victory

Belligerents
Germany	Soviet Union

Commanders and leaders
(Nazi Germany) Fedor von Bock; (Nazi Germany) Hermann Hoth; (Nazi Germany) Günther von Kluge; (Nazi Germany) Heinz Guderian; (Nazi Germany) Adolf Strauss; (Nazi Germany) Maximilian von Weichs	(Soviet Union) Dmitry Pavlov (executed); (Soviet Union) Vladimir Klimovskikh (executed); (Soviet Union) Ivan Boldin; (Soviet Union) Vasily Kuznetsov; (Soviet Union) Aleksandr Korobkov (executed); (Soviet Union) Pyotr Akhlyustin †; (Soviet Union) Pyotr Filatov †

Units involved
(Nazi Germany) Army Group Center	(Soviet Union) Western Front

Strength
750,000; 1,938 tanks and 1,500 aircraft	671,165; 4,522 tanks 14,171 guns/mortars and 2,100 aircraft

Casualties and losses
12,157; 101 tanks destroyed 276 aircraft destroyed	Modern Western estimate: 397,000 KIA and MIA, 77,000 WIA; Total: 474,000 Krivosheev's official Soviet data: 420,000 total, including 341,073 killed, missing or captured 4,799 tanks destroyed or abandoned 9,427 guns/mortars lost 1,669 aircraft destroyed

The Battle of Białystok–Minsk was a German strategic operation conducted by the Wehrmacht's Army Group Center under Field Marshal Fedor von Bock during the penetration of the Soviet border region in the opening stage of Operation Barbarossa, lasting from 22 June to 9 July 1941.

The Army Group's 2nd Panzer Group under Colonel General Heinz Guderian and the 3rd Panzer Group under Colonel General Hermann Hoth decimated the Soviet frontier defenses, defeated all Soviet counter-attacks and encircled four Soviet Armies of the Red Army's Western Front near Białystok and Minsk by 30 June. The majority of the Western Front was enclosed within, and the pockets were destroyed by 9 July. The Red Army lost from 420,000 to 474,000 men, against Wehrmacht casualties estimated between 12,157 and 67,244.

The Germans destroyed the Soviet Western Front in 18 days and advanced 460 kilometers into the Soviet Union, causing many to believe that the Germans had effectively won the war against the Soviet Union.

== Prelude ==
Commanded by Field Marshal Fedor von Bock, Army Group Centre was tasked with attacking from Poland through the Białystok – Minsk – Smolensk axis towards Moscow. The Army Group included the 9th and 4th Armies. Its armored forces were Hoth's 3rd Panzer Group and Guderian's 2nd Panzer Group. The two infantry Armies fielded 33 divisions and the Panzer Armies fielded nine Panzer divisions, six motorized divisions and a cavalry division. Army Group Center could call upon Luftflotte 2 for air support.

Facing Army Group Center was the Red Army's Western Front commanded by General of the Army Dmitry Pavlov. It included the 3rd, 4th, and 10th Armies along the frontier. The 13th Army was held as part of the Stavka High Command Reserve and initially existed as a headquarters unit only, with no assigned forces. All together, the Soviet Western Front had 25 rifle and cavalry divisions, 13 tank and 7 motorized divisions.

The Red Army disposition in Belarus was based on the idea of avoiding a war of attrition by engaging in an aggressive counterattack to any invasion and carrying the war into German-occupied Poland. The plan suffered from weakness along the flanks, created by circumstances such as the line of demarcation placement following the division of Poland in 1939. The forward placement of both German and Soviet forces in a double-bulge position enabled both sides to try the double envelopment. However, it was the OKH that undertook it successfully thanks to preempting hostilities, destroying much of the Red Air Force in the airfields while simultaneously severing most of the Soviet Western Front's land forces from lines of communication with other Soviet fronts. They fell to a double envelopment, centred on Białystok and Novogrudok. The engagement was later known as the "Battle of Białystok–Minsk", but that is actually a slight misnomer.

== Formations ==
=== Soviet ===
- Western Front – Commander Army General Dmitry Pavlov, Chief of Staff General Vladimir Klimovskikh, Operations Officer General Ivan Boldin
  - 3rd Army – Vasily Kuznetsov
    - 4th Rifle Corps
    - 11th Mechanized Corps
  - 4th Army – Lieutenant General Aleksandr Korobkov
    - 28th Rifle Corps
    - 14th Mechanized Corps
  - 10th Army – Konstantin Golubev
    - 1st Rifle Corps
    - 5th Rifle Corps
    - 6th Cavalry Corps
    - 6th Mechanized Corps
    - 13th Mechanized Corps
  - Second echelon (pending formation)
    - 13th Army – Lieutenant General Pyotr Filatov
    - 17th Mechanized Corps
    - 20th Mechanized Corps
    - 4th Airborne Corps

=== German ===
- Army Group Centre (German: Heeresgruppe Mitte) – Commander Generalfeldmarschall Fedor von Bock
  - 3rd Panzer Group – Generaloberst Hermann Hoth
    - XXXIX Army Corps (mot.) – Generaloberst Rudolf Schmidt
    - LVII Army Corps (mot.) – General der Panzertruppen Adolf Kuntzen
    - VI Army Corps – General der Pioniere Otto-Wilhelm Förster
  - 9th Army – Generaloberst Adolf Strauss
    - V Army Corps – Generaloberst Richard Ruoff
    - VIII Army Corps – Generaloberst Walter Heitz
    - XX Army Corps – General der Infanterie Friedrich Materna
  - 4th Army – Generalfeldmarschall Günther von Kluge
    - VII Army Corps – General der Artillerie Wilhelm Fahrmbacher
    - IX Army Corps – General der Infanterie Hermann Geyer
    - XII Army Corps – General der Infanterie Walther Schroth
    - XIII Army Corps – General der Infanterie Hans Felber
    - XLIII Corps – Generaloberst Gotthard Heinrici
  - 2nd Panzer Group – Generaloberst Heinz Guderian
    - XXIV Panzer Corps – General der Panzertruppen Leo Freiherr Geyr von Schweppenburg
    - XLVI Panzer Corps – General Heinrich von Viettinghoff-Scheel
    - XLVII Panzer Corps – General der Panzertruppen Joachim Lemelsen
    - 10th Infantry Division (mot.) – Generalleutnant Friedrich-Wilhelm von Loeper
    - 1st Cavalry Division – Generalleutnant Kurt Feldt
  - Reserve: 2nd Army – Generaloberst Maximilian von Weichs
    - XXXV Corps – General der Infanterie Rudolf Kaempfe
    - XLII Corps – General der Pioniere Walter Kuntze
    - LIII Army Corps – General der Infanterie Karl Weisenberger
    - 286th Security Division – Generalleutnant Kurt Müller

=== Tanks ===
On 22 June 1941, the balance of tanks over the entire area of the Soviet Western Front was as follows.

German corps	German Panzer divisions	Total German tanks (Note: Total German tanks includes non-combat "commander tanks" as well as outdated Panzer I and Panzer II tanks)	Tanks with 37 mm cannon (incl. Panzer 38(t) and Panzer III)	Tanks with 50 mm or larger cannon (incl. Panzer III and Panzer IV)
XXXIX. Armeekorps mot	7th, 20th	494	288	61
LVII Panzer Corps	12th, 19th	448	219	60
XLVII Panzer Corps	17th, 18th	420	99	187
XLVI Panzer Corps	10th	182	0	125
XXIV Panzer Corps	3rd, 4th	392	60	207
Any other unit of Army Group Center		0	0	0
Total		1936	666	640

Soviet corps	Soviet divisions	Total Soviet tanks	T-34 and KV
11th Mechanized Corps	29th, 33rd, 204th	414	20
6th Mechanized Corps	4th, 7th, 29th	1131	452 (Note: On 1 June there were 114 KV tanks, 238 T-34 tanks, but another 100 T-34 tanks were received until 22 June 1941 (Solonin 2007, pp. 99–100).)
13th Mechanized Corps	25th, 31st, 208th	282	0
14th Mechanized Corps	22nd, 30th, 205th	518	0
7th Mechanized Corps	14th, 18th, 1st	959	103
5th Mechanized Corps	13th, 17th, (109th not incl.)	861	17
17th Mechanized Corps	(not fully formed)	63	N/A
20th Mechanized Corps	(not fully formed)	94	N/A
(independent)	57th division	200	0
Tanks scattered over various other units	Ordinary rifle divisions, etc.	not incl.	–
Total		4522	592

== Operation ==
The Red Army moved into Białystok (modern-day Poland), which shaped OKH planning. Beyond Białystok, Minsk was a key strategic railway junction and a defensive position of the main road and rail communications with Moscow.

Also caught in the German operation was part of the 11th Army of the Northwestern Front. In the north, 3rd Panzer Group attacked, cutting off the 11th Army from Western Front, and crossed the Neman River. The 2nd Panzer Group crossed the Bug River and by 23 June, it had penetrated 60 km into Soviet territory. The Panzer Groups' objectives were to meet east of Minsk and prevent any Red Army withdrawal from the encirclement. Operating with the Panzer Groups to encircle the Soviet forces, the 9th Army and 4th Army cut into the salient, beginning to encircle Soviet Armies around Białystok. On 23 June, the Soviet 10th Army attempted a counter-attack in accordance with pre-war planning, but failed to achieve its goals. On 24 June, General Pavlov ordered his operations officer, General Boldin, to take charge of the 6th and 11th Mechanized and the 6th Cavalry Corps for a counter-attack towards Hrodna to prevent the encirclement of Red Army formations near Białystok. This attack failed with heavy losses, although it may have allowed some units to escape the western encirclement towards Minsk.

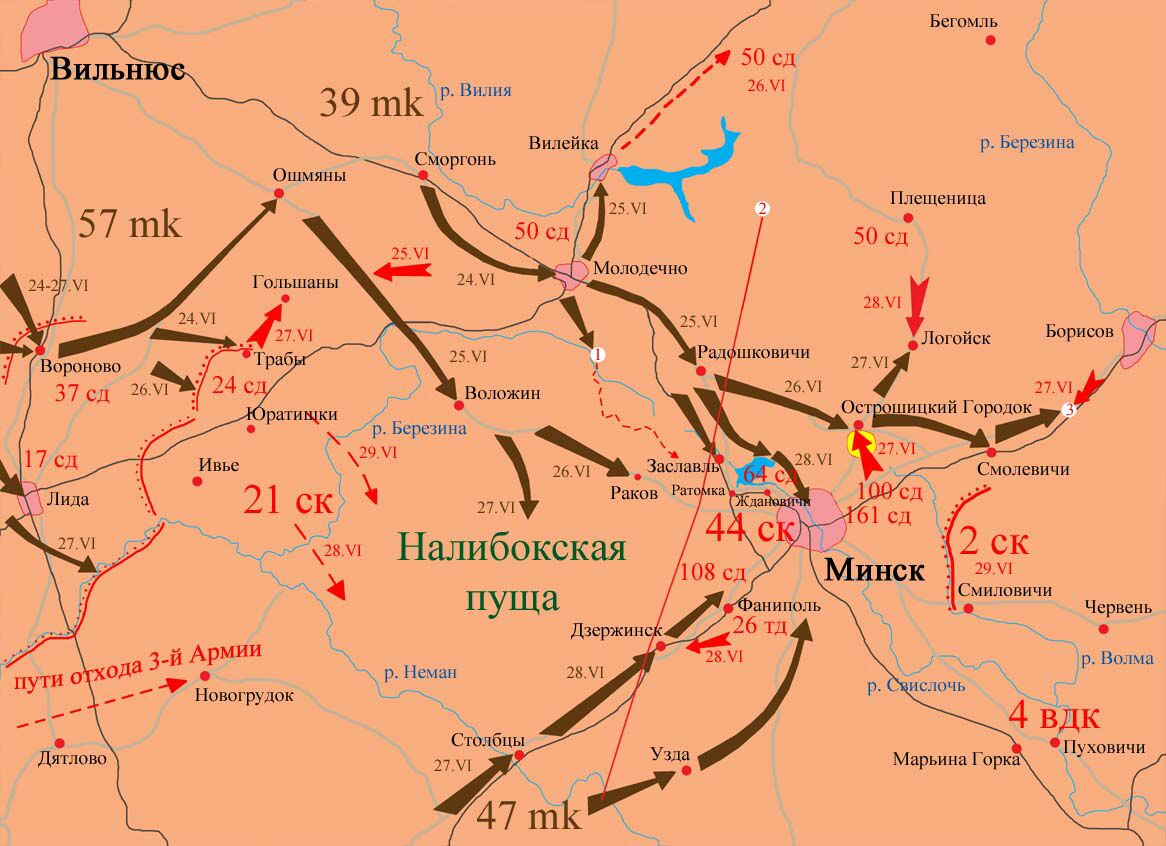
The Minsk (Novogrudok) pocket, 24–28 June (in Russian)

In the evening of 25 June, the German XLVII Panzer Corps cut between Slonim and Vawkavysk, forcing Pavlov to order the withdrawal of all troops in the salient behind the Shchara River at Slonim to avoid encirclement. Most formations could not break contact with the Germans, and due to the loss of fuel and transport assets those who could break out, had to withdraw on foot. This withdrawal opened the southern approaches of Minsk.

Seven days after the invasion on 29 June, the pincer of Guderian's 2nd Panzer Group and Hoth's 3rd Panzer Group closed east of Minsk. The Panzer Groups had advanced 321 km into the Soviet Union and almost a third of the distance to Moscow. On 28 June, the 9th and 4th German Armies linked up east of Białystok splitting the encircled Soviet forces into two pockets: a smaller Białystok pocket containing the Soviet 10th Army and a larger Novogrudok pocket containing the 3rd and 13th Armies. Ultimately, in 17 days the Soviet Western Front lost 417,790 personnel from a total of 671,165. On 26 June Minsk, the capital of Byelorussia, fell to the Wehrmacht.

A second Red Army counter-attack by the 20th Mechanized Corps and 4th Airborne Corps failed to breach the encirclement as well, and by 30 June the pocket was completely closed.

The German forces surrounded and eventually destroyed or took prisoner most of the Soviet 3rd and 10th, 13th Armies and part of the 4th Army, in total about 20 divisions, while the remainder of the 4th Army fell back eastwards towards the Western Berezina River.

The Luftwaffe's Luftflotte 2 helped destroy the VVS Western Front. Some 1,669 Soviet aircraft had been destroyed. The Luftwaffe lost 276 as destroyed and an additional 208 damaged. After only a week of fighting, the total serviceable strength of Luftflotte 1, Luftflotte 2 and Luftflotte 4 had been reduced to just 960 machines.

== Aftermath ==
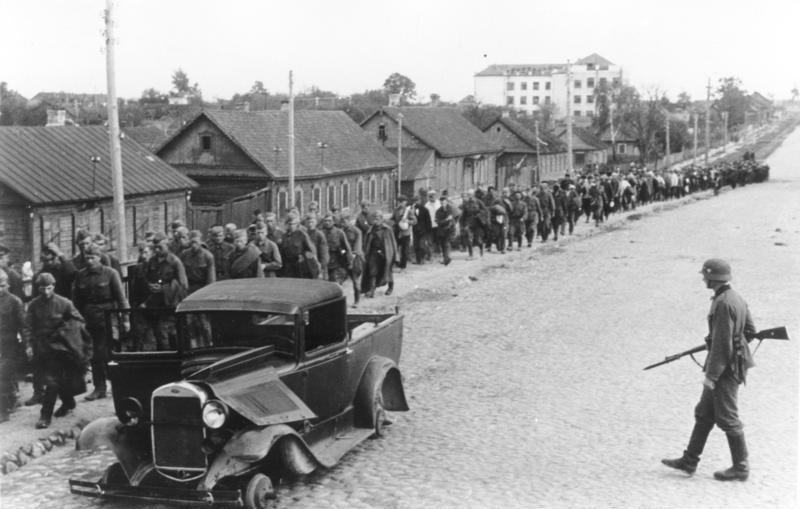
Soviet soldiers march into captivity in Minsk on 2 July 1941.

The Soviet troops trapped in the gigantic pockets continued fighting, and concluding operations resulted in high German casualties. An estimated 250,000 Soviet troops escaped because of the lack of German infantry troops' motor transport, which slowed the encirclement process.

The quick advance east created the possibility for the Wehrmacht to advance rapidly towards the land bridge of Smolensk from which an attack on Moscow could be planned. It also created the impression in the OKW that the war against the Soviet Union had already been won within days of its start. Still, Hitler blamed the Panzer generals for leaving gaps in the lines. The Panzer generals were deeply frustrated since for almost a week, their advance east had been stopped while they closed the pocket. They waited for the infantry to catch up and feared the momentum of the armored offensive would be lost.

Front Commander General Pavlov and his Front Staff were recalled to Moscow and accused of intentional disorganization of defence and retreat without battle. They were soon executed by the NKVD for cowardice and "failure to perform their duties" and their families were repressed. They were pardoned in 1956.

An exception was Pavlov's operations officer, General Ivan Boldin, who had been cut off by the German advance at a forward headquarters in the first days of the invasion but then fought his way back to Soviet lines with over 1,000 other soldiers a month and a half later.

=== Casualties ===
From 22 June to 9 July, the Soviet forces in Belarus, according to Soviet official data, lost 417,729 men, including 341,012 killed or missing and 76,717 wounded or sick. Soviet equipment losses totaled 1,177–1,669 aircraft, 4,799 tanks and 9,427 guns and mortars.

As for the Germans, from 22 June to 4 July, the 2nd Panzer Group lost 7,089 men and its 18th Panzer Division had 16 tanks destroyed by 6 July. The Panzer Group had only 6,320 replacements to cover the losses, but that deficit imposed only a minimal burden on its combat capabilities. The 3rd Panzer Group had casualties of 1,769 men by 2 July and had 85 tanks destroyed by 4 July. Its replacements totaled 4,730, more than enough to restore its losses. Five of the infantry divisions in the German Fourth and Ninth Armies lost 3,299 men.
