= Głębowice =

Głębowice may refer to the following places in Poland:

- Głębowice, Lower Silesian Voivodeship (south-west Poland)
- Głębowice, Lesser Poland Voivodeship (south Poland)
