= Walter Jost =

German Knight's Cross recipient, war criminal (1896–1945)

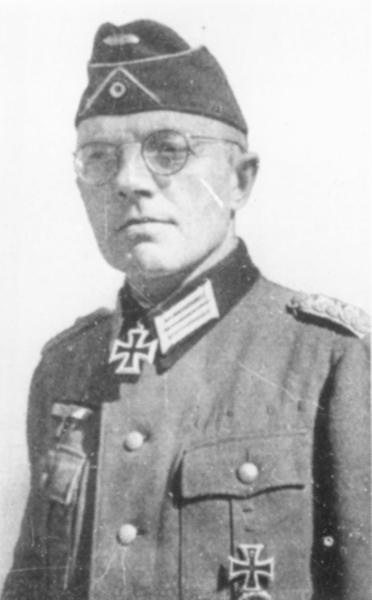
- Born: 25 July 1896; Rastatt, Grand Duchy of Baden, German Empire
- Died: † 24 April 1945 (aged 48); Villadose, Italy
- Relatives: ∞ 27 October 1923 Eva Alexandra Marie von Chamier-Glisczinski; 1 daughter
- Military career
- Allegiance: German Empire (to 1918); Weimar Republic (to 1933); Nazi Germany
- Branch: Imperial German Army; Reichsheer; German Army
- Service years: 1914–1945
- Rank: Generalleutnant
- Commands: 42nd Jäger Division
- Conflicts: World War I World War II: Battle of France; Operation Barbarossa; Battle of Białystok–Minsk; Battle of Smolensk (1941); Siege of Leningrad; Demyansk Pocket; Gothic Line Offensive; Spring 1945 offensive in Italy
- Awards: Knight's Cross of the Iron Cross
- Other work: Author

Walter Jost (25 July 1896 – 24 April 1945) was a German general during World War II. He was a recipient of the Knight's Cross of the Iron Cross of Nazi Germany. Troops under his command participated in the Ronchidoso massacre in Emilia-Romagna between 28 and 30 November 1944, when 66 civilians were executed.

== Death ==
Lieutenant General Jost was killed in action on 24 April 1945 in Villadose during a low-altitude attack by the Royal Air Force. He was buried on site with military honors.

After 1955, he was reinterred and buried at the new German War Cemetery in Costermano (officially inaugurated on 6 May 1967, after 12 years of construction and reinterment) in the Province of Verona, Veneto, Italy; final resting place: Block 3, Grave 593.

The war cemetery in Costermano is the final resting place of approximately 22,000 German war dead who perished on Italian soil during World War II. The vast majority were German soldiers. Around 180 of the deceased were of other nationalities, including French, Italian, and Russian. Among the dead are also about 60 German women who served as nurses, Luftwaffenhelfer, or administrative assistants. Even a 14-year-old member of the Hitler Youth is buried in the cemetery.

== Promotions ==
- 5 August 1914 Kriegsfreiwilliger (War Volunteer)
- 25 October 1915 Fahnenjunker (Officer Candidate)
- 25 November 1915 Fahnenjunker-Unteroffizier (Officer Candidate with Corporal/NCO/Junior Sergeant rank)
- 13 March 1916 Fähnrich (Officer Cadet)
- 22 September 1916 Leutnant (2nd Lieutenant) without Patent
  - 15 December 1918 received Patent from 10 September 1914
  - 1 July 1922 received Reichswehr Rank Seniority (RDA) from 1 April 1914 (75)
- 23 November 1923 Oberleutnant (1st Lieutenant) with effect and RDA from 1 November 1923 (16)
- 1 November 1928 Hauptmann (Captain) with RDA from 1 November 1928 (1)
- 11 July 1934 Charakter als Major (Brevet Major)
- 20 April 1935 Major with effect and RDA from 1 April 1935 (4)
- 31 July 1937 Oberstleutnant (Lieutenant Colonel) with effect and RDA from 1 August 1937 (63)
- 19 July 1940 Oberst (Colonel) with effect from 1 August 1940 (13)
  - 28 June 1942 received new and improved RDA from 1 February 1940 (9c)
- 20 April 1943 Generalmajor (Major General) with effect and RDA from 1 April 1943 (15a1)
- 15 January 1945 Generalleutnant (Lieutenant General) with effect and RDA from 1 December 1944 (1)

== Awards and decorations ==
- Iron Cross (1914), 2nd and 1st Class
  - 2nd Class on 9 June 1916
  - 1st Class on 24 August 1917
- Baden Order of the Zähringer Lion, Knight's Cross 2nd Class with Swords (BZ3bX) on 10 November 1917
- Austrian Military Merit Cross, 3rd Class with the War Decoration (ÖM3K) on 28 March 1918
- Wound Badge (1918) in Black
- Honour Cross of the World War 1914/1918 with Swords on 21 December 1934
- Wehrmacht Long Service Award, 4th to 1st Class (25-year Service Cross)
  - 2nd Class on 2 October 1936
  - 1st Class in August 1939
- Repetition Clasp 1939 to the Iron Cross 1914, 2nd and 1st Class
  - 2nd Class on 16 May 1940
  - 1st Class on 13 June 1940
- Wound Badge (1939) in Silver on 20 July 1942
- Winter Battle in the East 1941–42 Medal on 31 July 1942
- Infantry Assault Badge in Silver on 8 September 1942
- Knight's Cross of the Iron Cross on 31 March 1942 as Oberst and Commander of Infanterie-Regiment 75

== Writings (excerpt) ==
- Französische Kritik am deutschen Wehrbudget, in: "Zeitschrift für Politik", Volume 21, 1932, pp. 915 ff.
- Frei von Versailles – Das Scheitern des Abrüstungsgedenkens, in: "Jahrbuch des deutschen Heeres", 1936, pp. 21 ff.
- Helmuth von Moltke, 1800-1891, in: "Neue deutsche Biographie "Die Großen Deutschen"", Volume 3, Propyläen-Verlag, Berlin 1936, pp. 407–423
- Die wehrpolitische Revolution des Nationalsozialismus, Hanseatische Verlagsanstalt, Hamburg 1936

=== As editor ===
- Was wir vom Weltkrieg nicht wissen, Leipzig 1936 (2nd edition in 1938)
- Jahrbuch des deutschen Heeres, 1937
- Jahrbuch des deutschen Heeres, 1938
- Das deutsche Heer, Breslau 1939

== Sources ==
- German Federal Archives: BArch PERS 6/653 and PERS 6/299949

Military offices
| Preceded by Generalleutnant Josef Brauner von Haydringen | Commander of 42. Jäger-Division; 26 April 1944 – 24 April 1945 | Succeeded by None |
