= 253rd Infantry Division =

- 253. Infanterie-Division
- Active: 26 August 1939 – 5 May 1945
- Country: Nazi Germany
- Branch: Army
- Type: Infantry
- Size: Division
- Engagements: World War II: Battle of France; Operation Barbarossa; Winter campaign of 1941–42; Battles of Rzhev; Battle for Velikiye Luki

Commanders
- Notable commanders: Carl Becker

The 253rd Infantry Division (German: 253. Infanterie-Division) was an infantry division of the German Heer during World War II.

== History ==
=== 1939 ===
The 253rd Infantry Division was formed as part of the fourth Aufstellungswelle on 26 August 1939, the day of German mobilization. The initial divisional commander was Fritz Kühne.

Assembled in Münster in Wehrkreis VI, the 253rd Infantry Division's initial infantry regiments were numbered 453, 464, and 473, and drew upon the following reserve formations:

- Infantry Regiment 453 drew its first and third battalions from Infantry Regiment 39 Wesel, and its second battalion from Infantry Regiment 77 Cologne,
- Infantry Regiment 464 drew first, second, and third battalions, in that order, from Infantry Regiment 77 Cologne, Infantry Regiment 78 Eschweiler, and Infantry Regiment 64 Soest.
- Infantry Regiment 473 drew its first two battalions from Infantry Regiment 60 Arnsberg and its third battalion from Infantry Regiment 78 Aachen.

Additionally, the 253rd Infantry Division was equipped with Artillery Regiment 253.

=== 1940 ===
On 28 January 1940, the division passed several formations to the newly assembled 298th Infantry Division of the eighth Aufstellungswelle.

In spring and summer of 1940, the 253rd Infantry Division participated in the Battle for Belgium and France. After the German victory in the west, the 253rd Infantry Division remained in northern France until early 1941.

On 30 September 1940, the division transferred about a third of its strength to the newly assembled 126th Infantry Division of the eleventh Aufstellungswelle.

=== 1941 ===
On 7 March 1941, Otto Schellert took command of the division.

In May 1941, the 253rd Infantry Division was called to East Prussia in preparation for Operation Barbarossa.

During the German attack on the Soviet Union, the 253rd Infantry Division attacked through Lithuania and fought at the Battle for Velikiye Luki and the Battles of Rzhev. It also fought defensive actions against the Soviet Winter campaign of 1941–42.

=== 1942 ===
In January 1942, the 253rd Infantry Division was encircled at Lake Volgo, but managed to break out and return to German lines with heavy casualties.

Throughout the year 1942, the 253rd Infantry Division remained in the Rzhev salient.

=== 1943 ===
On 18 January 1943, Carl Becker replaced Schellert as divisional commander.

On 17 April 1943, the former Infantry Regiment 473, now renamed Grenadier Regiment 473, was dissolved. Two of the battalions were integrated into the Regiment 426 and 453. The rest of Regiment 473 became Divisional Battalion 473, resulting in a 253rd Infantry Division with two ternary regiments and one additional battalion, for a total of seven battalions.

The 253rd Infantry Division took part in defeating the Soviet autumn offensives in late 1943.

=== 1944 ===
On 17 June 1944, Hans Junck became divisional commander for a short period, before Carl Becker returned to his post on 28 June.

On 1 October 1944, Grenadier Regiment 473 was reassembled, using the third battalions of Regiments 453 and 464, resulting in a ternary division with three binary battalions as well as an additional battalion, for a continued total of seven battalions.

After combat under the 1st Panzer Army in the Beskids area, the 253rd Infantry Division, reduced to Kampfgruppe strength, was forced to retreat to Upper Silesia.

On 8 December 1944, Emmanuel von Kiliani temporarily took command of the division, before Carl Becker returned for a third and final tenure on 30 December.

=== 1945 ===
On 1 January 1945, the 253rd Infantry Division, then part of Army Group Heinrici under Army Group A, had a strength of 8,584 men.

The 253rd Infantry Division was forced from Upper Silesia to Moravia in April 1945.

The division was captured in the pocket at Deutsch-Brod in May 1945. The final commander of the division was Joachim Schwatlo-Gesterding, who had assumed command within days of surrender, on 5 May 1945.

== Superior formations ==
Organizational chart of the 253rd Infantry Division
Year	Month	Army Corps	Army	Army Group	Area
1939	September	Army reserves	5th Army	Army Group C	Eifel
1939	October	XXVII	4th Army	Army Group B	Eifel
1939	December	XXVI	6th Army	Army Group B	Lower Rhine
1940	January	Army reserves	6th Army	Army Group B	Lower Rhine
1940	May	XXVII	6th Army	Army Group B	Belgium
1940	June	Army Group reserves		Army Group A	Lille
1940	July – December	XXIX	9th Army	Army Group A	Northern France
1941	January – February	XXIX	9th Army	Army Group A	Northern France
1941	March – April	Army reserves	9th Army	Army Group A	Northern France
1941	May	XXVIII	16th Army	Army Group C	East Prussia
1941	June – July	Army reserves	16th Army	Army Group North	Lithuania
1941	August	L	9th Army	Army Group Center	Velikiye Luki
1941	September	XXIII	9th Army	Army Group Center	Velikiye Luki
1941	October	II	16th Army	Army Group North	Kalinin
1941	November – December	XXIII	9th Army	Army Group Center	Rzhev
1942	January – July	XXIII	9th Army	Army Group Center	Rzhev
1942	July	XXVII	9th Army	Army Group Center	Rzhev
1942	August – December	XXIII	9th Army	Army Group Center	Rzhev
1943	January – March	XXIII	9th Army	Army Group Center	Rzhev
1943	April	XXVII	4th Army	Army Group Center	Yelnya
1943	May – June	XXXIX	4th Army	Army Group Center	Yelnya
1943	July	Army reserves	4th Army	Army Group Center	Yelnya
1943	August	XXXXI	2nd Panzer Army	Army Group Center	Orel
1943	September	XXXXVI	9th Army	Army Group Center	Bryansk
1943	October – December	XXIII	9th Army	Army Group Center	Babruysk
1944	January – March	XXXXI	9th Army	Army Group Center	Babruysk
1944	April – May	LVI	2nd Army	Army Group Center	Kovel
1944	June	LVI	4th Panzer Army	Army Group North Ukraine	Kovel
1944	July	Army reserves	4th Panzer Army	Army Group North Ukraine	Chełm
1944	August – September	LVI	4th Panzer Army	Army Group North Ukraine	Vistula
1944	October	XXIV	1st Panzer Army	Army Group A	Beskids
1944	November – December	XI	1st Panzer Army	Army Group A	Beskids
1945	January	XI	1st Panzer Army	Army Group A	Beskids
1945	February – March	LIX	1st Panzer Army	Army Group Center	Upper Silesia
1945	April	XXXXIX	1st Panzer Army	Army Group Center	Upper Silesia
1945	May	Army reserves	1st Panzer Army	Army Group Center	Deutsch-Brod

== Noteworthy individuals ==
- Fritz Kühne, commanding general of the 253rd Infantry Division (26 August 1939 – 7 March 1941).
- Otto Schellert, commanding general of the 253rd Infantry Division (7 March 1941 – 18 January 1943).
- Carl Becker, commanding general of the 253rd Infantry Division (18 January 1943 – 17 June 1944, 28 June 1944 – 8 December 1944, 30 December 1944 – 5 May 1945)
- Hans Junck, commanding general of the 253rd Infantry Division (17 June 1944 – 28 June 1944).
- Emmanuel von Kiliani, commanding colonel of the 253rd Infantry Division (8 December 1944 – 30 December 1944).
- Joachim von Schwatlo-Gesterding, commanding general of the 253rd Infantry Division (5 May 1945 – 8 May 1945).

== Bibliography ==
- Raß, Christoph (2003). 'Menschenmaterial' — Deutsche Soldaten an der Ostfront: Innenansichten einer Infanteriedivision, 1939–1945 ['Human material' — German soldiers on the Eastern Front: Internal views on an Infantry Division, 1939–1945] (in German). Paderborn et al.: Ferdinand Schöningh. ISBN 3506744860.
