= 298th Infantry Division =

German WWII infantry division

The 298th Infantry Division (German: 298. Infanterie-Division) was an infantry division of the German Heer during World War II.

== History ==
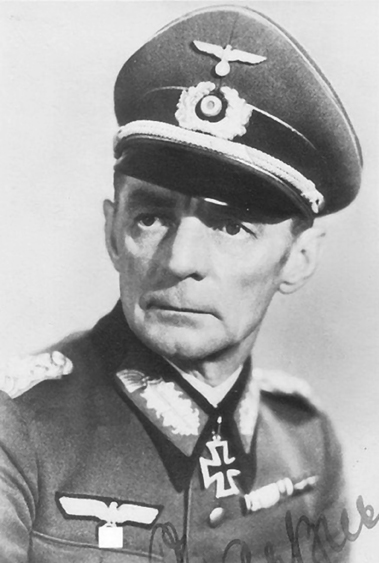
Walther Graeßner, divisional commander of the 298th Infantry Division between 6 February 1940 and 1 January 1942.

The 298th Infantry Division was formed as a division of the eighth Aufstellungswelle at Neuhammer military base on 6 February 1940. Initially headquartered at Breslau, the 298th Infantry Division was made of up three infantry regiments numbered 525 through 527, the Artillery Regiment 298, as well as the Division Units 298, comprising various support formations. The division was built around battalion-sized cadres supplied by the 7th, 8th, 28th, 62nd, 252nd, and 253rd Infantry Divisions, as well as recruits from the Silesia region. The initial divisional commander was Walther Graeßner, appointed on 6 February 1940.

On 6 November 1940, the division passed a third of its strength to the 335th Infantry Division of the fourteenth Aufstellungswelle. The transferred forces, which included the first battalions of each of the infantry regiments, were later replaced with fresh recruits.

In June 1941, the 298th Infantry Division saw its first combat on the Eastern Front.

On 1 January 1942, Arnold Szelinski took command of the division.

Over the course of 1942, three battalions (1st Bn 525th Rgt, 2nd Bn 526th Rgt, 3rd Bn 527th Rgt) were dissolved due to casualties.

Between October 1942 and January 1943, while under the supervision of the 8th Italian Army, the division suffered crushing casualties, rendering it ineffective as a fighting formation.

On 27 December 1942, Herbert Michaelis replaced Szelinski as divisional commander.

Subsequently, a military directive of 30 March 1943 instructed the merger of the remnants of the battered 298th, 385th, and 387th Infantry Divisions to a new 387th Infantry Division. For that purpose, three battalions of the 298th Infantry Division (Staff 525th Rgt, 1st Bn 527th Rgt, 2nd Bn 525th Rgt, 3rd Bn 526th Rgt) were merged into a new Grenadier Regiment 525, and the strength of the Artillery Regiment 298 was reformed into the 1st and 4th batteries of the new Artillery Regiment 387. The staff of the 298th Infantry Division became the staff of the new 389th "Rheingold" Infantry Division.

== Superior formations ==
Organizational chart of the 298th Infantry Division
| Year | Month | Army Corps | Army | Army Group | Area |
|---|---|---|---|---|---|
| 1940 | June | Army reserves | 12th Army | Army Group A | Aisne |
| 1940 | July – August | XVII Army Corps | 18th Army | None | Poland |
| 1940 | September – December | XVII Army Corps | 12th Army | Army Group B | Poland |
| 1941 | January – April | XVII Army Corps | 17th Army | Army Group B | Poland |
| 1941 | May | XVII Army Corps | 6th Army | Army Group A | Poland |
| 1941 | June – October | XVII Army Corps | 6th Army | Army Group South | Hrubieszów Kiev Donetsk |
| 1941 | November – December | LII Army Corps | 17th Army | Army Group South | Izium |
| 1942 | January | XXXXIV Army Corps | 17th Army | Army Group South | Izium |
| 1942 | February – May | XI Army Corps | Group Kleist | Army Group South | Lozova |
| 1942 | June | XIV Army Corps | Army Group reserves | Army Group South | Kharkiv |
| 1942 | July | Corps Förster | Army Wietersheim | Army Group South | Don bow |
| 1942 | August | 1st Romanian Corps | 17th Army | Army Group A | Don bow |
| 1942 | September | Army Group reserves | | Army Group B | Don steppes |
| 1942 | October | Army reserves | 8th Italian Army | Army Group B | Don steppes |
| 1942 | November | 2nd Italian Corps | 8th Italian Army | Army Group B | Bogachyovo |
| 1942 | December | XXXV Army Corps | 8th Italian Army | Army Group B | Bogachyovo |
| 1943 | January | Army reserves | 8th Italian Army | Army Group B | Chertkovo |
| 1943 | February | Army reserves | Army Lanz | Army Group B | Chertkovo |
| 1943 | March | Merged into 387th Infantry Division | | | |

== Noteworthy individuals ==
- Walther Graeßner, divisional commander of the 298th Infantry Division between 6 February 1940 and 1 January 1942.
- Arnold Szelinski, divisional commander of the 298th Infantry Division between 1 January 1942 and 27 December 1942.
- Herbert Michaelis, divisional commander of the 298th Infantry Division between 27 December 1942 and 30 March 1943.
- Friedrich Weber, divisional commander of the 298th Infantry Division between 20 November 1943 and 10 January 1944.
