= Vladimir Klimovskikh =

Soviet general

Vladimir Yefimovich Klimovskikh
- Native name: Владимир Ефимович Климовских
- Born: May 27, 1885; Kokand, Russian Empire
- Died: July 27, 1941 (aged 56) Kommunarka shooting ground, Moscow Oblast, Soviet Union
- Allegiance: Russian Empire (1914–1917); Soviet Russia (1918–1922); Soviet Union (1922–1941)
- Service years: 1914–1941
- Rank: Major General
- Commands: Chief of Staff of the Western Special Military District and the Western Front
- Conflicts: World War I; Russian Civil War; World War II (executed)
- Awards: Order of the Red Banner

Vladimir Yefimovich Klimovskikh (Russian: Владимир Ефимович Климовских; May 27, 1885 – July 27, 1941) was a Soviet general who served as the Chief of Staff of the Western Special Military District and the Western Front under General of the Army Dmitry Pavlov during the initial stage of the German invasion of the Soviet Union (Operation Barbarossa) in June 1941. After the disaster of the Battle of Białystok–Minsk, Klimovskikh, along with General Pavlov and the entire Front Staff, with the sole exception of Operations Officer Ivan Boldin, were recalled to Moscow, charged with military incompetence, and executed later that July.

== Early life and World War I ==
Klimovskikh was born on 27 May 1895 in Kokand, the son of an office clerk. After his 1912 graduation from a Realschule in Tashkent, Klimovskikh entered the Alexeyev Military School of the Imperial Russian Army in Moscow, from which he graduated in 1914. He was assigned to the 11th Siberian Rifle Regiment of the 3rd Siberian Rifle Division, with which he served until its disbandment in February 1918. Klimovskikh fought with the regiment in World War I on the Northern Front, serving in positions below battalion commander. Following the February Revolution, he was elected a member of the regimental committee, and a battalion commander. Klimovskikh ended his service in the Imperial Army with the rank of Captain; in early 1918 he and his regiment fought against the troops of the Ukrainian Central Rada near Kiev.

== Russian Civil War ==
Klimovskikh joined the Red Army in June 1918 and was enrolled in the junior course of the General Staff Academy. He was unable to study due to the evacuation of the academy to Kazan and the defection of its command and part of the student body to the White movement. Klimovskikh fought in the Russian Civil War, serving as assistant chief of staff of the 5th Army on the Eastern Front from August 1918. He subsequently served as the head of the operations department on the staff of the 3rd Army and was acting chief of staff of the 27th Rifle Division between March and April 1919. Klimovskikh was transferred to the Western Front after the White defeat in the east and fought in the Polish–Soviet War as head of the operations department on the staff of the 16th Army, chief of staff of the 57th Rifle Division during April and May 1920, and as chief of staff of the Mozyr Group of Forces.

== Interwar period and World War II ==
After the Civil War, he was the Chief of Staff of the infantry corps, the head of the department, an assistant to the chief of the headquarters of the military districts. From December 1932 to June 1936, he was on the teaching staff at the Frunze Military Academy. In 1935, he was awarded the rank of brigade commander. From July 1936 he served as assistant army inspector and then, in February 1938, was senior lecturer at the Military Academy of the General Staff. In September 1939 he was appointed Deputy Chief of Staff and then from July 1940 served as Chief of Staff of the Western Special Military District.

With the outbreak of war on the Eastern Front, he was made Chief of Staff of the Western Front under Army General Dmitry Pavlov. Commanded during the Battle of Białystok–Minsk from 22 June to 3 July 1941. Relieved of command on July 8, 1941, and accused of inaction and the collapse of the control of the troops. He was sentenced to death by the Military Collegium of the Supreme Court of the USSR on July 22, 1941. The verdict was carried out on July 27, 1941, at the Kommunarka shooting ground. He was posthumously rehabilitated in 1957.

== Awards and decorations ==
Russian Empire

Order of Saint Vladimir, 4th class with swords and a bow
Order of Saint Anna, 4th class with the inscription "For Courage"

Soviet Union

Order of the Red Banner (22 February 1938)
Jubilee Medal "XX Years of the Workers' and Peasants' Red Army" (1938)
