= Gotthard Heinrici =

German general (1886–1971)

- Heinrici in 1943
- Born: Feodor August Gotthard Heinrici; 25 December 1886; Gumbinnen, Kreis Gumbinnen, Province of East Prussia, German Empire (present-day Gusev, Gusevsky District, Kaliningrad Oblast, Russia)
- Died: 10 December 1971 (aged 84); Karlsruhe, Baden-Württemberg, West Germany
- Burial place: Bergäcker Cemetery
- Spouse: Gertrude Strupp (1897–1981)
- Children: 2
- Relatives: Georg Heinrici (uncle); Gerd von Rundstedt (cousin)
- Military career
- Allegiance: Kingdom of Prussia; German Empire; Weimar Republic; Nazi Germany
- Branch: Prussian Army; Imperial German Army; Reichsheer; German Army
- Service years: 1905–1945
- Rank: Generaloberst
- Nicknames: Unser Giftzwerg (lit. "our venomous dwarf"; "our nasty little man")
- Commands: 16th Infantry Division; 14th Company, 13th Württembergish Infantry Regiment; III Battalion, 3rd Prussian Infantry Regiment; XII Army Corps; XXXXIII Army Corps; 4th Army; 1st Panzer Army; Army Group Vistula
- Conflicts: See battles World War I: Western Front; German invasion of Belgium (1914); Battle of Verdun; Eastern Front; East Prussian Campaign; First Battle of the Masurian Lakes; Battle of Łódź (1914); World War II: Western Front; Battle of France; Eastern Front; Operation Barbarossa; Battle of Białystok-Minsk; First Battle of Kiev; Battle of Moscow; Orsha offensives (1943); Battle of the Dukla Pass; Battle of Berlin; Battle of the Oder-Neisse; Battle of the Seelow Heights
- Awards: Knight's Cross of the Iron Cross with Oak Leaves and Swords

Feodor August Gotthard Heinrici (German: [ˈɡɔthaʁt haɪnˈʁiːtsi]; 25 December 1886 – 10 December 1971), a general in the German army during World War II, acquired a reputation as the premier defensive expert of the Wehrmacht. His final command, Army Group Vistula, formed in 1945 from the remnants of Army Group A and Army Group Center to defend Berlin from the Soviet armies advancing from the Vistula River.

Late in the war, Heinrici was dismissed by Wilhelm Keitel for refusing to throw his remaining forces into a last-ditch effort to save Hitler as the Soviets overran Berlin, but survived to surrender to British forces on 28 May. He was held as a prisoner of war until 1948, and later supported efforts by the U.S. Army Center of Military History to study the experiences of German forces during the war.

Heinrici died in 1971 at the age of 84.

== Early life and career ==
Heinrici was born in 1886 at Gumbinnen in East Prussia, the son of a minister of the Evangelical Church in Germany. He came from a long line of East Prussian theologians, including his uncle Georg Heinrici and his grandfather Carl August Heinrici, and remained a devout Lutheran throughout his life. Following graduation from secondary school in 1905, he broke from family tradition and joined the army as a cadet in an infantry division on 8 March 1905. From 1905 to 1906, Heinrici attended a war school. During World War I, Heinrici fought in the German invasion of Belgium and earned the Iron Cross 2nd Class in September 1914. Heinrici's division was then transferred to the Eastern Front. There, he fought in the First Battle of the Masurian Lakes and the Battle of Łódź, receiving the Iron Cross 1st Class in July 1915.

In May 1916, Heinrici took part in the Battle of Verdun. Beginning in September 1916, he served in General Staff positions with the XXIV Reserve Corps and the 115th Infantry Division. In March 1917, Heinrici was posted to the German General Staff. In September, he attended a General Staffs officer training course, and later served as a staff officer with VII Corps and the VIII Corps. In February 1918, Heinrici was posted to an infantry division, serving as a staff officer responsible for operations. In this position, he was awarded the Prussian Knight's Cross of the Royal House Order of Hohenzollern with Swords in August 1918.

Heinrici had two children, Hartmut and Gisela, with his wife Gertrude. He was a devout Protestant (Lutheran) who regularly went to church. His religious faith and refusal to join the Nazi party made him unpopular with the Nazi hierarchy and led to clashes with Hitler and Reichsmarschall Hermann Göring, who scorned him. Because Heinrici's wife Gertrude had a Jewish parent, their children were labeled Mischlinge (partly Jewish) under Nazi racial law. However, Heinrici received a "German Blood Certificate" from Hitler himself, which validated their supposed "Aryan" status and protected them from discrimination.

== World War II ==
During the Battle of France, Heinrici's command was part of General Wilhelm Ritter von Leeb's Army Group C. He commanded the XII Army Corps which was part of the 1st Army. Heinrici's forces succeeded in breaking through the Maginot Line south of Saarbrücken on 14 June 1940.

In 1941, during Operation Barbarossa, Heinrici served in the 4th Army under Günther von Kluge as the commanding general of the XXXXIII Army Corps during the Battle of Białystok–Minsk, the Battle of Kiev and the Battle of Moscow. He received the Knight's Cross of the Iron Cross in 1941. Late in January 1942, Heinrici was given command of the 4th Army. On 24 November 1943, he was awarded the Oak Leaves to his Knight's Cross for his leadership during the Battle of Orsha, during which the 4th Army taking defensive positions near the Orsha region in Belarus, temporarily halted the advance of the Western Front led by General Vasiliy Sokolovsky. During the 4th Army's retreat, it inflicted heavy losses on the advancing Red Army. These successes contributed greatly to Heinrici's reputation as a defensive specialist. Later in 1943, he refused to obey an order to destroy the city of Smolensk by fire before the German army's retreat, and he was temporarily dismissed from his post as commander.

Heinrici wrote in his diary:

"Hampered by the snow and especially the snowdrifts, often shoveling ourselves out metre by metre, and traveling with vehicles and equipment that are by no means adequate for the Russian winter, behind us the enemy pressing on, concern to bring the troops to safety in time, to carry the wounded along, not to let too many weapons or too much equipment fall into enemy hands, all this was sorely trying for the troops and their leaders...Kitted-out with fabulous winter equipment, the Russians everywhere push through the wide gaps that have opened up in our front...The retreat in snow and ice is absolutely Napoleonic in its manner. The losses are similar."

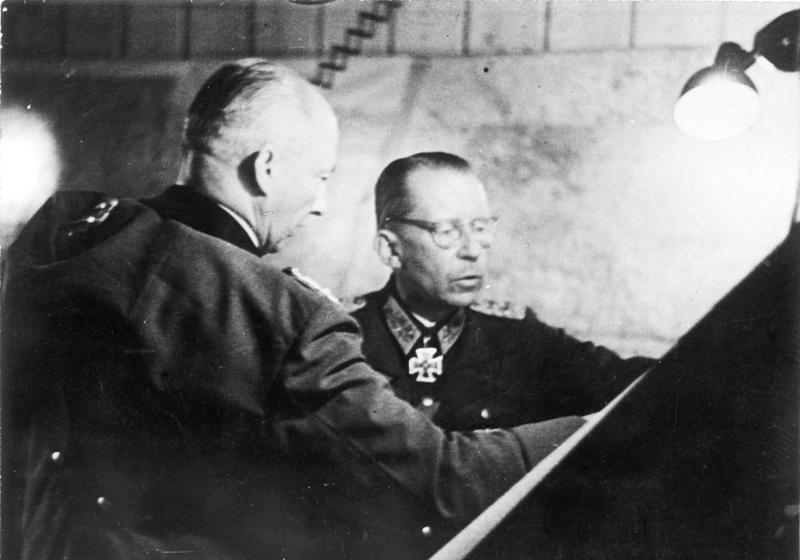
Field Marshal Günther von Kluge (left) and Heinrici, mid-1943

In 1944, after the previous successes of the Red Army in Ukraine, Heinrici repeatedly argued for the retreat of Army Group Center and a concomitant shortening of the front line; Hitler rejected these plans at a staff meeting on 20 May 1944. On 4 June, Heinrici was relieved of command of the 4th Army, which was later encircled east of Minsk and nearly destroyed during Operation Bagration.

In the summer of 1944, after eight months of forced retirement, Heinrici was sent to Hungary and placed in command of the 1st Panzer Army; as well as the Hungarian First Army which was attached to it. He was able to keep the 1st Panzer Army relatively intact as it retreated into Slovakia. Later in 1944, during the Battle of the Dukla Pass, the 1st Panzer Army prevented Soviet forces from linking up with Slovak rebel forces of the concurrent Slovak National Uprising. Heinrici was awarded the Swords to the Oak Leaves of his Knight's Cross on 3 March 1945.

=== Retreat from the Oder ===
On 20 March 1945, Hitler replaced Heinrich Himmler with Heinrici as Commander-in-Chief of Army Group Vistula on the Eastern Front. Indicating that he was ill, Himmler had abandoned his post on 13 March and retired to a sanatorium at Lychen. At this time, Army Group Vistula's front was less than 80 kilometres (50 mi) from Berlin.

Army Group Vistula consisted of two armies: the 3rd Panzer Army led by General Hasso von Manteuffel and the 9th Army led by General Theodor Busse. Heinrici was tasked with preventing a Soviet attack across the Oder River amid shortages of manpower and material. Only the terrain itself favoured Heinrici; he dug the 9th Army into three defensive lines atop Seelow Heights, overlooking the sandy, swampy banks of the Oder. Manteuffel's 3rd Panzer Army, which had fewer panzers than the 9th, was similarly positioned in the north to delay a possible flanking strike by Marshal Konstantin Rokossovsky's 2nd Byelorussian Front.

On 16 April, the Battle of the Oder-Neisse began. The Soviets attacked with about 1,500,000 men for what they called the "Berlin Offensive Operation". During the Battle of Berlin, Heinrici withdrew his troops westward and made no attempt to defend the city. According to Antony Beevor, Heinrici deliberately avoided defending Berlin to spare its civilian population and child soldiers from urban fighting. By late April, Heinrici ordered the retreat of his army group away from the Oder River. Hitler only became aware of the retreat of Army Group Vistula around 21 April, after a puzzling request by Heinrici, who sought permission to move his headquarters to a new site, which was farther west than Berlin.

=== Dismissal ===
On 28 April, Field Marshal Wilhelm Keitel, Chief of the German Armed Forces High Command, was riding along the roads north of Berlin when he noticed that troops of the 7th Panzer Division and of the 25th Panzergrenadier Division were marching north, away from Berlin. These troops were part of von Manteuffel's 3rd Panzer Army. As one of the two armies which made up Heinrici's Army Group Vistula, it was supposed to be on its way to Berlin. Instead, Heinrici was moving it northward in an attempt to halt the Soviet breakthrough at Neubrandenburg, contrary to orders of Keitel and his deputy, General Alfred Jodl. Keitel located Heinrici on a road near Neubrandenburg, accompanied by Manteuffel. The encounter resulted in a heated confrontation that led to Heinrici's dismissal by 29 April for disobeying orders.

Heinrici was replaced by General Kurt Student. General Kurt von Tippelskirch was named as Heinrici's interim replacement until Student could arrive and assume control of Army Group Vistula. Student was captured by the British before he could take command. The rapidly deteriorating situation that the Germans faced meant that Army Group Vistula's coordination of the armies under its nominal command during the last few days of the war was of little significance.

Heinrici was dismissed by Keitel for refusing to save Hitler. He was summoned to Berlin and would have complied had Captain Hellmuth Lang not persuaded him to "drive as slowly as you can" to Plön instead, informing him that he would be murdered in Berlin like Rommel (who had once been Heinrici's adjutant, and later Lang's commander). Heinrici then gave himself up to British forces at Plön on 28 May.

== Post-war life ==
After his capture, Heinrici was held at Island Farm, a British prisoner of war camp at Bridgend, South Wales, where he remained, except for a three-week transfer to a camp in the United States in October 1947, until his release on 19 May 1948. In the 1950s, he helped create the Operational History (German) Section of the United States Army Center of Military History, established in January 1946 to harness the operational knowledge and experience of German prisoners of war for the United States Army. He was also featured prominently in Cornelius Ryan's 1966 book, The Last Battle. Heinrici died in 1971 in Karlsruhe and was buried with full military honours at the Bergäcker cemetery in Freiburg im Breisgau.

== Legacy ==
Despite being married to a half-Jewish (Mischling) woman, Heinrici supported many Nazi nationalistic and fascistic policies including the Lebensraum concept of territorial expansion, but disagreed with many of their racial policies. He was shocked by the anti-Jewish pogroms of Kristallnacht, although this did not lead him to distance himself from the Nazi regime.

On the eve of Operation Barbarossa, Heinrici, on receiving the Commissar Order, justified the summary execution of Soviet political commissars as easing pressure on the front lines through the exercise of "preventive terror" in the rear. Heinrici wrote home to his family that the Soviet soldier fought "very hard", he concluded that Soviet soldiers were "a much better soldier than the Frenchman. Extremely tough, devious and deceitful." He repeatedly ignored "scorched-earth" orders, such as the order to destroy the city of Smolensk. He conspired with Albert Speer to undermine Hitler's Nero Decree, which ordered the destruction of German infrastructure, including bridges.

As a military commander, historians have described him as the premier defensive expert of the Wehrmacht and a genius admired by his peers, whose present-day obscurity could be due to his being, in the words of Samuel W. Mitcham, "as charismatic as a 20-pound sack of fertilizer". British military historian B.H. Liddell Hart, who interviewed Heinrici after the war, described him in similar terms, as "a small, precise man with a parsonical manner" who "talks as if he were saying grace" and "hardly looks like a soldier."

In 2014, Heinrici's private letters and diaries were published in the book A German General on the Eastern Front: The Letters and Diaries of Gotthard Heinrici 1941–1942 edited by Johannes Hürter. In his writings, Heinrici revealed his growing doubts about Hitler's strategy and his mounting concern as the Wehrmacht was implicated in war crimes and the first actions of the Holocaust.

Hürter wrote that Heinrici proved to be a tough and capable commander who demanded as much of himself as his soldiers. According to the Operations Officer of Army Group Vistula, his staff officers admired him as a "perfect example of a traditional Prussian officer". As an army commander, Heinrici constantly maintained personal contact with combat troops on the front. In doing so, he corresponded to the Prussian-German (and also Hitler's) ideal of a high-ranking troop commander who led "from the front", and combined the skills of a general staff officer with the boldness of the front-line officer. Heinrici's personal writings demonstrate empathy for his soldiers, for whom he felt responsible. Regarding crimes committed in Heinrici's area of command in the Soviet Union, Hürter writes that despite Heinrici's growing respect for the fighting power of the enemy and a burgeoning understanding of the devastated population, it did not change the fact that war crimes such as the execution of commissars also occurred in Heinrici's area of command.

== Promotions ==
- 8 March 1905 Fahnenjunker (Officer Candidate)
- 19 July 1905 Fahnenjunker-Unteroffizier (Officer Candidate with Corporal/NCO/Junior Sergeant rank)
- 19 December 1905 Fähnrich (Officer Cadet)
- 18 August 1906 Leutnant (2nd Lieutenant) with Patent from 15 February 1905
- 17 February 1914 Oberleutnant (1st Lieutenant)
- 18 June 1915 Hauptmann (Captain)
  - 1922 received Reichswehr Rank Seniority (RDA) from 18 June 1915 (13)
- 1 February 1926 Major (6)
- 1 August 1930 Oberstleutnant (Lieutenant Colonel)
- 1 March 1933 Oberst (Colonel)
- 18 January 1936 Generalmajor (Major General) with effect and RDA from 1 January 1936 (3)
- 28 February 1938 Generalleutnant (Lieutenant General) with effect and RDA from 1 March 1938 (1)
- 17 May 1940 General der Infanterie (General of the Infantry) with effect and RDA from 1 June 1940 (1a)
- 21 January 1943 Generaloberst with effect and RDA from 1 January 1943 (1)

== Awards and decorations ==
- Iron Cross (1914), 2nd and 1st Class
  - 2nd Class on 27 September 1914
  - 1st Class on 24 July 1915
- Saxe-Ernestine House Order, Knights Cross 2nd Class with Swords (HSEH3bX/HSH3bX/EH3bX) on 4 November 1914
- Military Merit Cross (Austria-Hungary), 3rd Class with War Decoration (ÖM3K) on 10 December 1914
- Order of the White Falcon, Knight's Cross 2nd Class with Swords (GSF3bX/SF3bX) in May 1915
- Princely Schwarzburg Honor Cross, III. Class with Swords on (SEK3X/SE3X) in May 1915
- Saxe-Coburg and Gotha Carl Eduard War Cross (CK) on 9 April 1916
- Saxe-Coburg and Gotha Duke Carl Eduard Medal, 2nd Class with Swords (HSCC2X/CM2X) on 20 January 1917
- Hamburg Hanseatic Cross (HH) on 23 July 1918
- Prussian Royal House Order of Hohenzollern, Knight's Cross with Swords (HOH3X) on 9 August 1918
- Princely Reuss Honour Cross, 3rd Class with Swords (REK3X/RE3X)
- Honour Cross of the World War 1914/1918 with Swords
- Wehrmacht Long Service Award, 4th to 1st Class on 2 October 1936
- Repetition Clasp 1939 to the Iron Cross 1914, 2nd and 1st Class
  - 2nd Class on 13 May 1940
  - 1st Class on 16 June 1940
- Winter Battle in the East 1941–42 Medal on 1 August 1942
- Mentioned twice by name in the Wehrmachtbericht on 23 November 1943 and 8 October 1944
- Knight's Cross of the Iron Cross with Oak Leaves and Swords
  - 510th Knight's Cross on 18 September 1941 as General der Infanterie and Commanding General of XXXXIII Army Corps
  - 333rd Oak Leaves on 24 November 1943 as Generaloberst and Commander-in-Chief of the 4th Army
  - 136th Swords on 3 March 1945 as Generaloberst and Commander-in-Chief of the 1st Panzer Army

Military offices
Preceded by Generalleutnant Gerhard Glokke	Commander of 16. Infanterie-Division; 12 October 1937 – 31 January 1940	Succeeded by Generalmajor Heinrich Krampf
Preceded by General der Infanterie Walther Schroth	Commander of XII. Armeekorps; 9 April 1940 – 17 June 1940	Succeeded by General der Infanterie Walther Schroth
Preceded by General der Gebirgstruppe Franz Böhme	Commander of XXXXIII. Armeekorps; 17 June 1940 - 20 January 1942	Succeeded by Generalmajor Gerhard Berthold
Preceded by General der Gebirgstruppe Ludwig Kübler	Commander of 4. Armee; 20 January 1942 – 6 June 1942	Succeeded by Generaloberst Hans von Salmuth
Preceded by Generaloberst Hans von Salmuth	Commander of 4. Armee; 15 July 1942 – June 1943	Succeeded by Generaloberst Hans von Salmuth
Preceded by Generaloberst Hans von Salmuth	Commander of 4. Armee; 31 July 1943 – 4 June 1944	Succeeded by General der Infanterie Kurt von Tippelskirch
Preceded by Generaloberst Erhard Raus	Commander of 1. Panzerarmee; 15 August 1944 – 19 March 1945	Succeeded by Generaloberst Walther Nehring
Preceded by Reichsführer-SS Heinrich Himmler	Commander of Heeresgruppe Weichsel (Army Group Vistula); 20 March 1945 – 28 April 1945	Succeeded by General der Infanterie Kurt von Tippelskirch
