= 21st Army (Wehrmacht) =

- German: 21. Armee
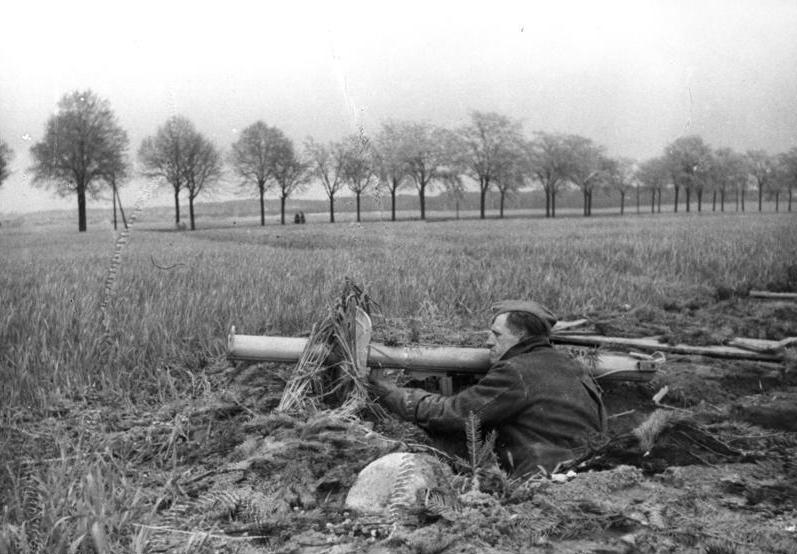
- On the outskirts of Berlin, April 1945, the Volkssturm takes anti-tank guns into combat position
- Active: 27 April – 8 May 1945
- Country: Nazi Germany
- Branch: German army ( Wehrmacht)
- Size: Field army

Commanders
- Only commander: Kurt von Tippelskirch

The 21st Army (German: 21. Armee) was a German field army in World War II.

On 27 April 1945, towards the end of the war in Europe, the 21st Army was formed from Headquarters, 4th Army as part of Army Group Vistula (Heeresgruppe Weichsel) and fought until 8 May 1945.

== Commanders ==
No.	Portrait	Commander	Took office	Left office	Time in office
1	Kurt von Tippelskirch	General der Infanterie; Kurt von Tippelskirch (1891–1957)	27 April 1945	8 May 1945	11 days

== Bibliography ==
- Tessin, Georg (1970). "Die Landstreifkräfte 15–30" [Ground forces 15 to 30]. Verbände und Truppen der deutschen Wehrmacht und Waffen-SS 1939-1945 (in German). Vol. 4. Osnabrück: Biblio.
- Ziemke, Earl F. (2002). Stalingrad to Berlin: The German Defeat in the East. Washington D.C.: Center of Military History, US Army. ISBN 9781780392875.
