= XII Army Corps (Wehrmacht) =

- XII. Armeekorps
- Active: October 1936 – July 1944
- Country: Nazi Germany
- Branch: Army
- Size: Corps
- Engagements: World War II: Battle of France; Invasion of Poland; Operation Barbarossa; Operation Bagration

XII Army Corps (German: XII. Armeekorps) was a corps in the German Army during World War II. It was formed in the Wehrkreis XII recruitment and training district in Wiesbaden in October 1936 and was mobilized before the outbreak of war at the end of August 1939.

At the start of World War II the corps were part of the 1st Army and based in the Saar region. In 1939 it fought with the 4th Army in Poland. In June 1940 they broke through the Maginot line to the Moselle near Nancy.

In Operation Barbarossa in June 1941 the corps were attached to Panzer Group 2 for the attack on the stronghold of Brest-Litovsk. After advancing further into Russia they were held up by Soviet counter-attacks.

Following Operation Bagration, the huge Soviet counter-attack in 1944, XII Corps were forced to retreat in bad condition and in July 1944 were finally destroyed in a pocket east of Minsk. General Müller was taken prisoner.

The corps was reformed in April 1945 to defend the middle Rhine and Thuringia under General Herbert Osterkamp.

== Commanders ==
- Infantry General (General der Infanterie) Walther Schroth, 4 February 1938 – 9 April 1940
- Colonel-general (Generaloberst) Gotthard Heinrici, 9 April – 17 June 1940
- Infantry General (General der Infanterie) Walther Schroth, 17 June 1940 – 19 February 1942
- Infantry General (General der Infanterie) Walther Graeßner, 19 February 1942 – 18 February 1943
- Infantry General (General der Infanterie) Kurt von Tippelskirch, 18 February 1943 – 4 June 1944
- Lieutenant-general (Generalleutnant) Vincenz Müller, 4 June – 5 July 1944

After reformation

- Artillery General (General der Artillerie) Herbert Osterkamp, April 1945 –8 May 1945

== Area of Operation ==
- Poland : September 1939 - May 1940
- France : May 1940 - June 1941
- Eastern Front, Central sector : June 1941 - May 1944
- Minsk : May 1944 - July 1944
- South-west Germany : July 1944 - February 1945
