= Carl Eduard War Cross =

Carl Edward War Cross Carl-Eduard-Kriegskreuz
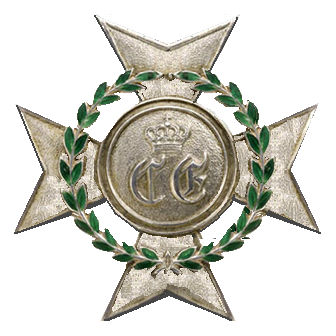
- Carl Edward War Cross
- Type: Military decoration
- Awarded for: Bravery and military merit
- Presented by: Saxe-Coburg and Gotha
- Campaign: World War I
- Established: 19 July 1916

Highlights
- Total: 97

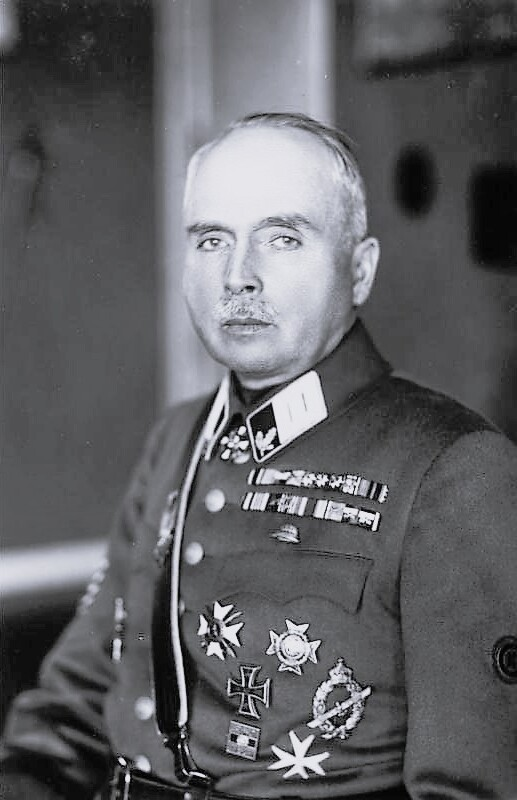
Duke Charles Edward, in uniform wearing the Carl Eduard War Cross

The Carl Eduard War Cross (German: Carl-Eduard-Kriegskreuz) was a military decoration of Saxe-Coburg and Gotha presented during World War I. Established 19 July 1916, by Charles Edward, Duke of Saxe-Coburg and Gotha, the cross recognized military merit and bravery in battle, without regard to rank. Awarded only 97 times, it is one of the rarest of World War I German military decorations. Recipients must have already been holders of the Iron Cross, 1st Class and been serving in the 6. Thüringischses Infanterie-Regiment Nr. 95.

== Insignia ==
The Carl Eduard War Cross is in the shape of a Maltese cross, made of silver. On the obverse in the center medallion is the cypher CE surmounted by a ducal crown. The medallion is surrounded by a green enameled laurel wreath superimposed on the arms of the cross. The reverse of the medallion displays the coat of arms of Saxe-Coburg and Gotha surrounded by the words FIDELITER ET CONSTANTER.

== Notable recipients ==
- Gotthard Heinrici
- Paul von Hindenburg
- Fritz von Selle
