= Orsha offensives (1943) =

Series of battles fought in Belarus between the Red Army and the Wehrmacht in 1943

- Part of The Eastern Front of World War II
Date	October 12, 1943 – November 19, 1943
Location	Orsha region, Belarus, Soviet Union 54.50°N 30.42°E
Result	German defensive victory

Belligerents
Soviet Union	(Nazi Germany) Germany

Commanders and leaders
(Soviet Union) Vasily Sokolovsky	(Nazi Germany) Gotthard Heinrici

Strength
Western Front; 310,900 men, with steady reinforcements	4th Army; 193,510 men; heavy fortifications

Casualties and losses
53,537	35,056

The Orsha offensives were a series of battles fought in Belarus between the Red Army and the Wehrmacht during the autumn of 1943, and into the following winter. Orsha was a main road junction with the north–south route from Leningrad to Kiev and the east–west route from Minsk to Moscow. After the failure of Operation Typhoon in the winter of 1941, Army Group Centre had spent the most part on the defensive in the central sector of the front. The time afforded to them in 1942, a distinct period of inactivity in this area, allowed the Wehrmacht to build formidable defensive positions.

== Prelude ==
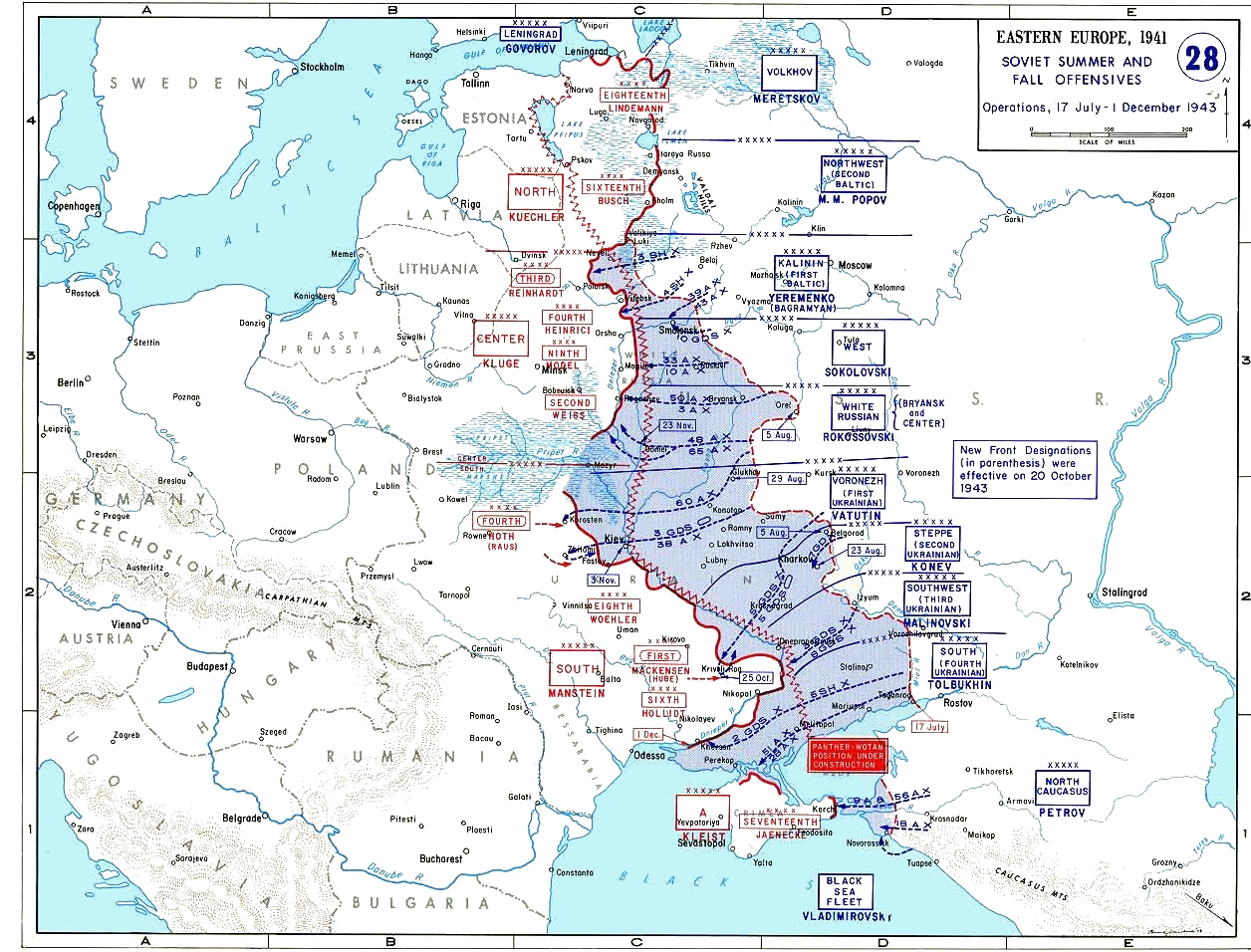
Panther-Wotan Line

After their defeat in the Battle of Smolensk, the Wehrmacht retreated on a broad front to the Panther-Stellung line. The German 4th Army (Heinrici)—part of Army Group Centre—took defensive positions near Orsha. To the north, the 3rd Panzer Army (Reinhardt) took up defensive lines around Vitebsk, and to the south the 9th Army (Model) held the area east of Bobrujsk. The Soviet Stavka saw the liberation of Ukraine as their primary goal, so the Lower Dnieper Offensive had priority in equipment and reinforcements.

== The battles ==
The 4th Army was in retreat to the Panther-Wotan line, pursued by the Soviets. Troops from the Soviet Western Front then launched a heavy attack on both sides of the Minsk-Moscow highway. One thrust was directed at Orsha, a main road junction, and another at Bogushevsk.

== Literature ==
Frieser K-H., Schmider K. & Schönherr K. (2007) Das deutsche Reich und der Zweite Weltkrieg, Vol. 8, Die Ostfront 1943/44, Deutsche Verlags-Anstalt, Stuttgart: 1350 pp.
