= Kurt von Tippelskirch =

German general (1891–1957)

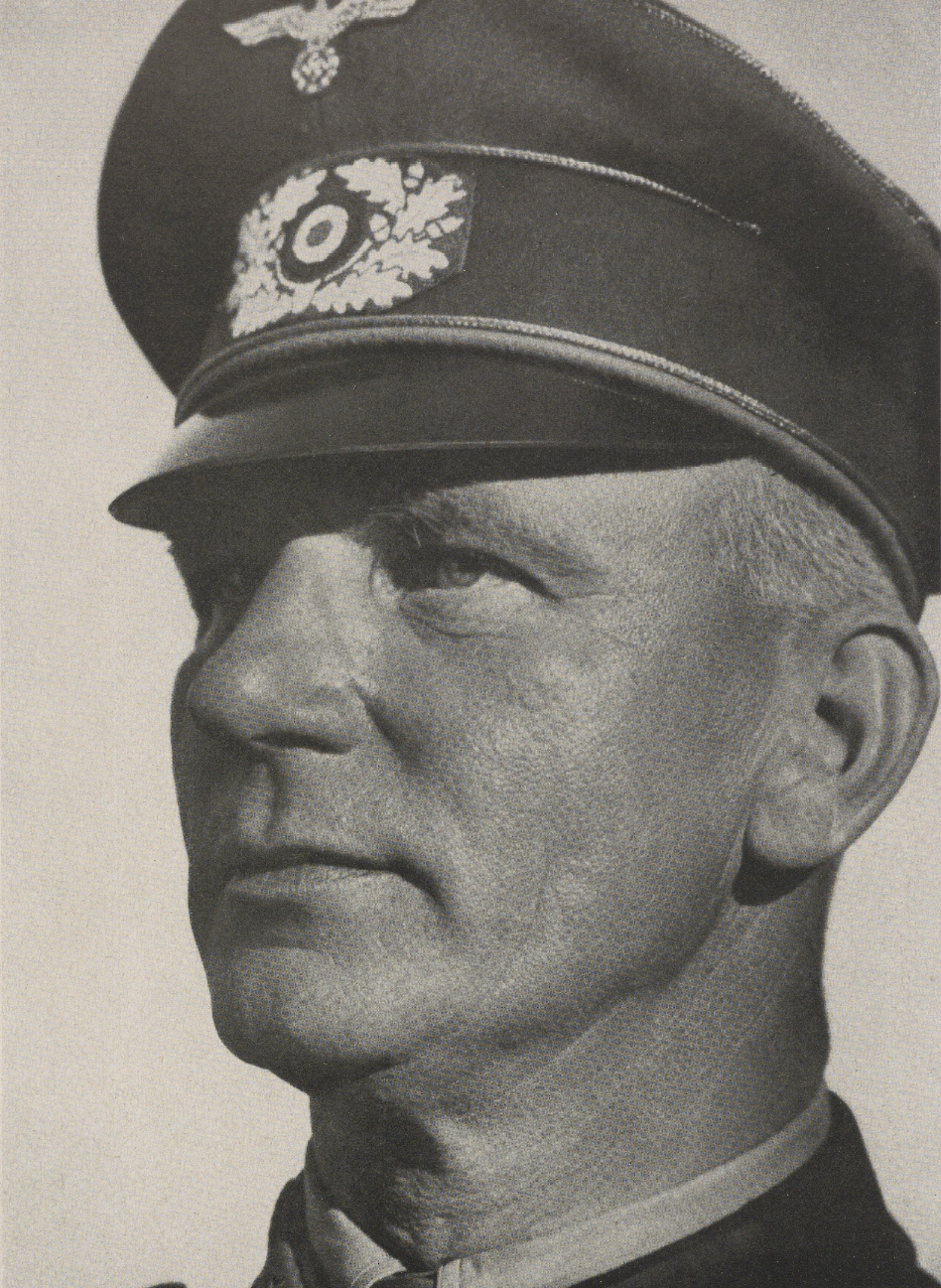
- Born: 9 October 1891; Charlottenburg, Kingdom of Prussia, German Empire
- Died: 10 May 1957 (aged 65); Lüneburg, Lower Saxony, West Germany
- Relatives: Curt Gallenkamp (brother-in-law)
- Military career
- Allegiance: German Empire; Weimar Republic; Nazi Germany
- Branch: Imperial German Army; Reichswehr; German Army
- Service years: 1910–1945
- Rank: General der Infanterie
- Commands: 30th Infantry Division; XII Army Corps; 1st Army; 14th Army; 21st Army; Army Group Vistula
- Conflicts: World War I; First Battle of the Marne; World War II; Eastern Front; Italian Campaign; Gothic Line Campaign; Battle of Berlin
- Awards: Knight's Cross of the Iron Cross with Oak Leaves

Kurt Oskar Heinrich Ludwig Wilhelm von Tippelskirch (9 October 1891 – 10 May 1957) was a German general during World War II who commanded several armies and Army Group Vistula. He surrendered to the United States Army on 2 May 1945. Tippelskirch wrote several books, such as the History of the Second World War, 1951. He died in 1957.

== Early life and World War I ==
Kurt von Tippelskirch was born on 9 October 1891 in Charlottenburg in the Kingdom of Prussia as the son of Hans von Tippelskirch (1863–1945), a Prussian Generalmajor, and Helene, née Stuckenschmidt (1865–1946).

After graduation from the Prussian cadet corps, Tippelskirch entered the Prussian Army on 24 June 1909 as a Fähnrich in Königin Elisabeth Garde-Grenadier-Regiment Nr. 3, an elite Prussian Guards regiment. He was commissioned a Leutnant on 20 March 1911 with a Patent of 24 June 1909. He went into the field with his regiment in World War I and was wounded in the First Battle of the Marne, falling into French captivity and later internment in Switzerland.

== Interwar years ==
Tippelskirch returned from Switzerland in 1919 and was promoted on 3 September 1919 to Oberleutnant with a Patent of 18 June 1915 and to Hauptmann with a Patent of 20 June 1918. He was accepted into the Reichswehr, serving in the 9. (Preußisches) Infanterie-Regiment in Potsdam. On 16 March 1920, he married Elli, née Gallenkamp. On 1 April 1924, he was transferred to the military intelligence section in the Ministry of the Reichswehr. On 1 October 1926, he was transferred to the 14. Reiter-Regiment while remaining tasked to the Ministry of the Reichswehr. On 1 April 1927 he was transferred to the staff of the 3rd Division in Berlin. He returned to the staff of the Ministry of the Reichswehr on 1 October 1929 and was promoted to Major on 1 February 1930.

On 1 February 1933, Tippelskirch was promoted to Oberstleutnant and on 1 October 1933, he was named a battalion commander in the 5. (Preußisches) Infanterie-Regiment. He then assisted with the formation of Infanterie-Regiment 27, where he was named commander of a half-regiment and later of the regiment. On 1 March 1935, he was promoted to Oberst.

Tippelskirch was named a section chief in the General Staff of the Army on 6 October 1936, placing him in charge of military intelligence for threats from the west (Abteilung Fremde Heere West). He was promoted to Generalmajor on 1 April 1938 and on 10 November 1938, he was named Oberquartiermeister IV in the General Staff of the Army, placing him in overall charge of military intelligence.

== World War II ==
Tippelskirch remained on the General Staff in the early stages of World War II. He was promoted to Generalleutnant on 1 June 1940 and participated in the negotiations of the Armistice of 22 June 1940.

On 5 January 1941, Tippelskirch took command of the 30th Infantry Division, which participated in Operation Barbarossa. As part of Army Group North, the division prevented the breakthrough of a Soviet corps on the river Pola and then went on to counterattack. The battle lasted a week and Tippelskirch, having distinguished himself as commander of the division, was awarded the Knight's Cross of the Iron Cross on 23 November. In early 1942, the 30th Infantry Division was encircled in the Demyansk Pocket, and Tippelskirch was ordered to be flown out.

On 4 June 1942, Tippelskirch was placed in the Führerreserve (Leaders Reserve) of the German Army and on 27 August 1942 he was promoted to General der Infanterie (his seniority date as general was adjusted to 1 February 1942 on 16 November 1942). On 11 September 1942, he was assigned as the liaison officer of the Italian 8th Army near the Don river. This position was extremely difficult for Tippelskirch because he had no German staff at his disposal and the Italians were reluctant to seek advice from German officers. The Italian 8th Army was sent into the Battle of Stalingrad at the end of the year. Tippelskirch was recalled from the front in February 1943 and returned to the Führerreserve.

On 16 February 1943, Tippelskirch became the commanding general of the XII Army Corps. He retained this position until 4 June 1944, when he had to assume temporary command of the 4th Army from General Gotthard Heinrici. Soon after, Operation Bagration against Army Group Center began on 22 June. The 4th Army was defending the Mogilev area and repeatedly requested permission to retreat. The approval came too late, but Tippelskirch along with most of the army managed to withdraw to behind the Dnieper, although 4th Army was still threatened by three Soviet fronts. The 4th Army was encircled east of Minsk on 1 July 1944, and most units of the army were forced to surrender on 8 July 1944. Tippelskirch himself was at the time outside the pocket and escaped capture.

On 18 July 1944 Tippelskirch suffered severe injuries in a plane crash. He was placed in the Führerreserve and hospitalized until 19 August 1944. On 30 July he received the Knight's Cross with Oak Leaves for his achievements in the fighting at Mogilev.

From 29 October to 22 November 1944, he replaced the ailing Otto von Knobelsdorff as the commander of the 1st Army in Lorraine. On 28 November 1944, he was sent on a special mission by Hitler to the Supreme Command West. On 6 December of the same year, for the duration of the absence of Joachim Lemelsen, he was tasked with the command of the 14th Army during the Italian campaign. He led the 14th Army until the end of February 1945.

On 25 April 1945, Tippelskirch took command of the 21st Army in Mecklenburg and Brandenburg. On 29 April however, General Heinrici — now the commander of Army Group Vistula — was dismissed, and Tippelskirch was ordered by Field Marshal Wilhelm Keitel to temporarily take over command of the army group. He reluctantly did so, taking the opportunity to negotiate with the Western Allies. He surrendered on 2 May 1945 in the Ludwigslust area to American forces. Tippelskirch was interned in British custody until January 1948.

== Awards and decorations ==
=== German ===
- Kingdom of Prussia:
  - Iron Cross 2nd Class (18 November 1914)
  - Iron Cross 1st Class (20 December 1919)
- German Empire: Wound Badge in Black (9 August 1919)
- Order of Saint John (Bailiwick of Brandenburg), Knight of Honor (June 1923)
- Nazi Germany:
  - Honour Cross of the World War 1914/1918 for Combatants
  - Wehrmacht Long Service Award, 4th to 1st Class (2 October 1936)
  - Sudetenland Medal with Prague Castle Bar (30 September 1939)
  - 1939 Clasp to the Iron Cross 2nd Class (30 September 1939)
  - 1939 Clasp to the Iron Cross 1st Class (31 May 1940)
  - Eastern Front Medal (26 August 1942)
  - Demyansk Shield
  - Knight's Cross of the Iron Cross with Oak Leaves
    - Knight's Cross on 23 November 1941 as Generalleutnant and commander of the 30. Infanterie-Division
    - 539th Oak Leaves on 30 July 1944 as General der Infanterie and deputy commander-in-chief of the 4. Armee

=== Foreign ===
- Kingdom of Greece:
  - Order of the Redeemer, Officer's Cross (19 June 1914)
  - Order of the Phoenix, Grand Commander (18 February 1939)
- Kingdom of Hungary: Order of Merit of the Kingdom of Hungary, Commander (1937)
- Kingdom of Italy: Order of Saints Maurice and Lazarus, Officer's Cross (1937)
- Empire of Japan: Order of the Sacred Treasure, 3rd Class (12 January 1938)
- Republic of Lithuania: Order of the Lithuanian Grand Duke Gediminas (23 October 1933)
- Slovak Republic: Commemorative Medal For The Defence Of Slovakia (14 March 1940)
- Spanish State: Imperial Order of the Yoke and Arrows, Encomienda con Placa
- Kingdom of Yugoslavia: Order of the Crown of Yugoslavia, Commander (12 January 1938)

Military offices
Preceded by Generalmajor Walter Buechs	Commander of 30. Infanterie-Division; 5 January 1941 – 5 June 1942	Succeeded by Generalleutnant Thomas-Emil von Wickede
Preceded by General der Infantrie Walther Graeßner	Commander of XII. Armee Corps; 18 February 1943 – 4 June 1944	Succeeded by Generalleutnant Vincenz Müller
Preceded by Generaloberst Gotthard Heinrici	Commander of 4. Armee; 4 June 1944 – 18 July 1944	Succeeded by General der Infantrie Friedrich Hoßbach
Preceded by General der Panzertruppe Traugott Herr	Commander of 14. Armee; 12 December 1944 – 22 February 1945	Succeeded by General der Panzertruppe Joachim Lemelsen
Preceded by none	Commander of 21. Armee; 27 April 1945 – 2 May 1945	Succeeded by none
Preceded by Generaloberst Gotthard Heinrici	Commander of Army Group Vistula; 29 April 1945 – 1 May 1945	Succeeded by none
