= Battle of the Oder–Neisse =

Component of World War 2

- Part of the Eastern Front of the Second World War
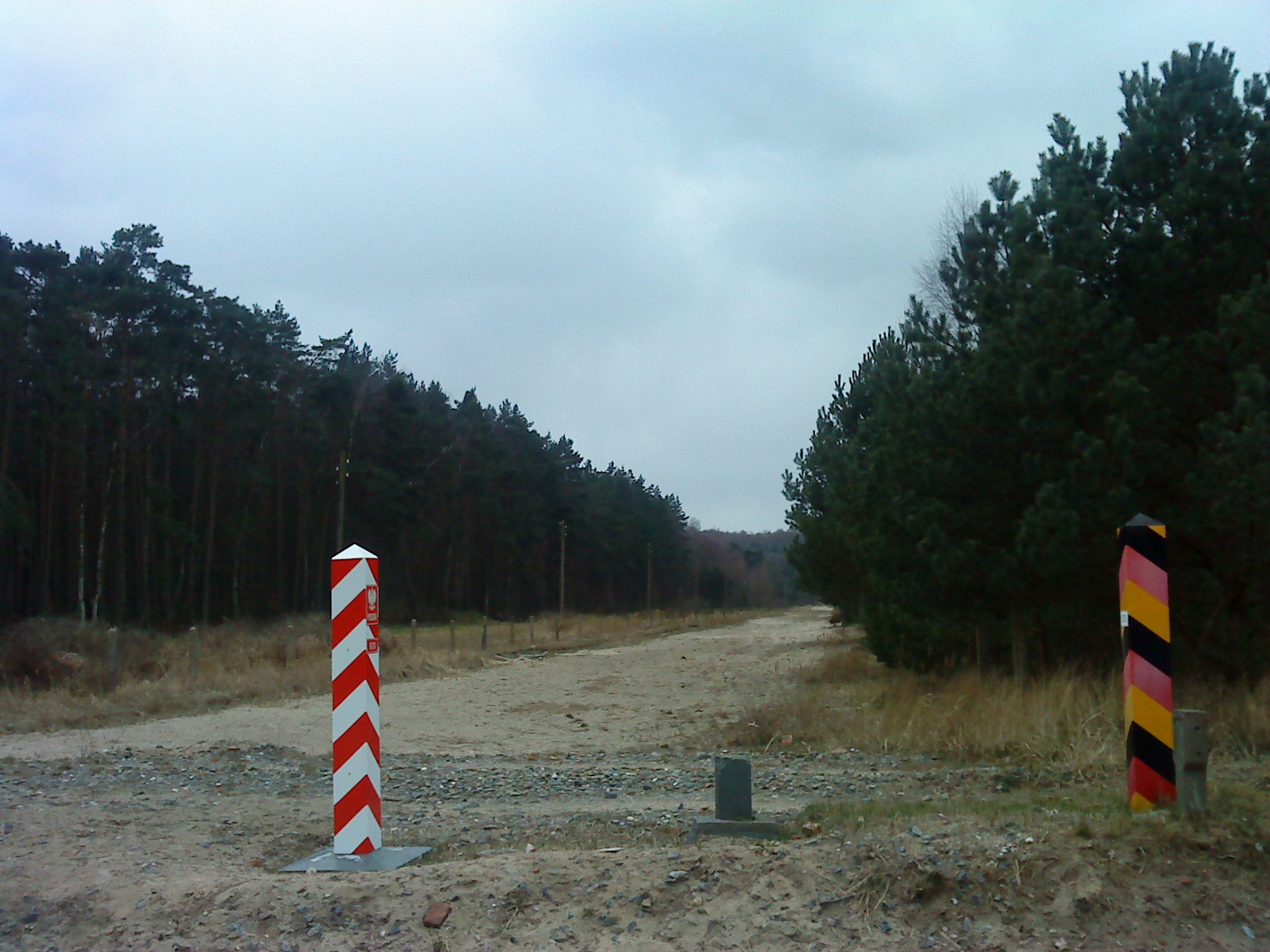
- A modern view of the Oder-Neisse line at Usedom
Date	16 April — 19 April 1945
Location	Oder–Neisse, Germany 52°31′47.3″N 14°25′33.9″E
Result	Soviet victory

Belligerents
Soviet Union; Poland	Germany

Commanders and leaders
(Soviet Union) Georgy Zhukov (Soviet Union) Ivan Konev (Soviet Union) Konstantin Rokossovsky	(Nazi Germany) Gotthard Heinrici (Nazi Germany) Ferdinand Schörner

Strength
2,500,000	300,000

Casualties and losses
80,000–100,000	Unknown

The Battle of the Oder–Neisse is the German name for the initial (operational) phase of one of the last two strategic offensives conducted by the Red Army in the Campaign in Central Europe (1 January – 9 May 1945) during World War II. Its initial breakthrough phase was fought over four days, from 16 April until 19 April 1945, within the larger context of the Battle of Berlin. The Soviet military planners divide the frontal and pincer phases of the operation, named Berlin Strategic Offensive Operation into:

Stettin–Rostock Offensive Operation (16 April – 5 May 1945) by the 2nd Belorussian Front.
Seelow–Berlin Offensive Operation (16–19 April 1945) by the 1st Belorussian Front.
Cottbus–Potsdam Offensive Operation (16–27 April 1945) by the northern flank and Cavalry Mechanized Group of the 1st Ukrainian Front.
Spremberg–Torgau Offensive Operation (16–25 April 1945) by the southern flank of the 1st Ukrainian Front.

The battle included heavy fighting by the three Fronts of the Marshals of Soviet Union Konstantin Rokossovsky's 2nd Belorussian Front, Georgy Zhukov's 1st Belorussian Front and Ivan Konev's 1st Ukrainian Front, that assaulted the defending Wehrmacht Army Group Vistula commanded by Colonel-General (Generaloberst) Gotthard Heinrici and Field Marshal Ferdinand Schörner's Army Group Centre.

== Combat operations ==
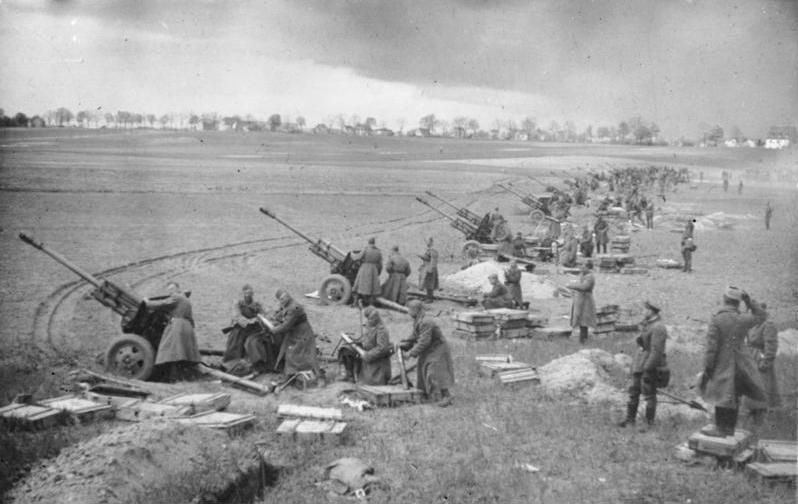
Soviet artillery bombarding German positions during the Battle of the Seelow Heights

Most of the fighting took place during 1st Belorussian Front's assault on the Seelow Heights, that were defended by the German 9th Army (part of Army Group Vistula), in what became known as the Battle of the Seelow Heights. 1st Ukrainian Front encountered much lighter resistance crossing the Neisse to penetrate defensive lines of Army Group Centre.

In the early hours on 16 April 1945, the Berlin Strategic Offensive Operation began with a massive bombardment by thousands of artillery pieces and Katyusha rockets in a barrage which was sustained for as long as two hours on some sectors of the front. Shortly afterwards and well before dawn, the 1st Belorussian Front attacked across the Oder, and the 1st Ukrainian Front attacked across the Neisse. The 1st Belorussian Front was strengthened because it had the more difficult assignment and was facing the majority of the German forces in prepared defences.

== Battle of the Seelow Heights ==
The initial attack by the 1st Belorussian Front was a disaster; Heinrici anticipated the move and withdrew his defenders from the first line of trenches just before the Red Army artillery obliterated them. The light from 143 searchlights, which were intended to blind the defenders, was diffused by the early morning mist and made useful silhouettes of the attacking Red Army formations. The swampy ground proved to be a great hindrance and under a German counter-barrage, Red Army casualties were very heavy. Frustrated by the slow advance, or perhaps on the direct orders of the Stavka ("Headquarters"), Zhukov threw in his reserves, which in his plan were to have been held back to exploit the expected breakthrough. By early evening, an advance of almost six kilometres had been achieved in some areas, but the German lines remained relatively intact.

Zhukov was forced to report that the Seelow Heights offensive was not going as planned. Stalin, to spur Zhukov, told him that he would give Konev permission to wheel his tank armies towards Berlin from the south. The Red Army tactic of using a dense concentration of firepower was providing the usual results. By nightfall of 17 April, the German front before Zhukov remained unbroken, but only just.

On 18 April, both Soviet Fronts made steady progress. By nightfall, the 1st Belorussian Front had reached the third and final German line of defence.

On the fourth day of the battle, 19 April, the 1st Belorussian Front broke through the final line of the Seelow Heights with nothing except severely depleted, withdrawing German formations between its troops and Berlin. The remnants of General Theodor Busse's 9th Army, which had been holding the heights, and the remaining northern flank of the 4th Panzer Army, were in danger of being enveloped by elements of the 1st Ukrainian Front.

== Cottbus-Potsdam Offensive Operation ==
In the south, the attack by the 1st Ukrainian Front was keeping to plan because Army Group Centre (under the command of General Ferdinand Schörner) was not providing as much opposition as that faced by Zhukov's troops. 4th Panzer Army on the north flank of his formation was falling back under the weight of the 1st Ukrainian Front Attack. Two Panzer divisions on the southern flank were retained in reserve for possible need in the centre of the Army Group front, and were not available for use to shore up the 4th Panzer Army. This was the turning point in the battle, because by nightfall the positions of both the Army Group Vistula and southern sectors of Army Group Centre were becoming untenable. Unless they fell back in line with the 4th Panzer Army, they faced envelopment. In effect, Konev's successful attacks on Schörner's poor defences to the south of the Seelow Heights positions were unhinging Heinrici's defence.

On 18 April, the 1st Ukrainian Front, having captured the city of Forst, was preparing to break out into the relatively flat terrain.

Elements of the 3rd Guards, 3rd and 4th Guards Tank Armies, which were the Front's Cavalry Mechanized Group, having exploited the breach in the 4th Panzer Army sector of the front, turned north between Seyda and Jüterbog towards a meeting with the 1st Belorussian Front west of Berlin.

== Spremberg-Torgau Offensive ==
Other Armies of the 1st Ukrainian Front's southern flank attacked west linking up with the Americans. During the attack the Führerbegleitbrigade (the Führer escort brigade) was encircled within the Spremberg Pocket and destroyed. Its survivors who broke out surrendered to the Americans.

The offensive would mark the "meeting at Torgau" when the 58th Guards Rifle Division of the 5th Guards Army, part of 1st Ukrainian Front, made contact with the US 69th Infantry Division of the First Army near Torgau, Germany on the Elbe River, reaching the Mulde by 8 May.

== Stettin-Rostock Offensive Operation ==
On 20 April, between Stettin and Schwedt, Rokossovsky's 2nd Belorussian Front attacked the northern flank of Army Group Vistula, held by the III Panzer Army. By 22 April, the 2nd Belorussian Front had established a bridgehead on the west bank of the Oder over 15 km deep, and was heavily engaged with the III Panzer Army.

On 25 April, the second Belorussian Front broke through 3rd Panzer's line around the bridgehead south of Stettin and crossed the Randow swamp on the Gramzow area. They were now free to move west towards the British 21st Army Group, and north towards the Baltic ports of Stralsund and Rostock.

== Results ==
By the end of 19 April, the German Eastern Front line north of Frankfurt around the Seelow and to the south around Forst had ceased to exist. The breakthroughs allowed the two Red Army Fronts to envelop large parts of the German 9th and 4th Panzer Armies in a large pocket 37 km east of Frankfurt that attempted to follow the Oder-Spree Canal to Berlin. Attempts by the 9th Army to break out to the west would result in the Battle of Halbe.

While the 1st Belorussian Front encircled Berlin, the 1st Ukrainian Front started the battle for the city itself.

== Operational statistics ==
The cost to the Red Army in making the initial breakthrough was very high. Between 1 April and 19 April, it lost over 2,807 tanks. During the same period, the Western Allies lost 1,079 tanks.

== See also ==
- Eastern Front (World War II)
- Leonidas Squadron

== Sources ==
- Beevor, Antony. Berlin: the Downfall, 1945, ISBN 0-670-88695-5
- Ziemke, Earl F. Battle For Berlin: End of the Third Reich, NY: Ballantine Books, London:Macdomald & Co, 1969.
