= 42nd Jäger Division =

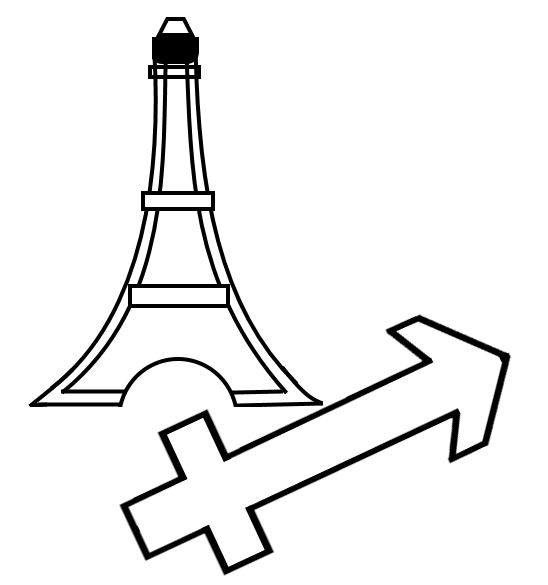
- 42. Jäger Division Vehicle Insignia
- Active: 1939–45
- Country: Nazi Germany
- Branch: Army
- Type: Infantry
- Size: Division
- Engagements: World War II

42nd Jäger Division (German: 42. Jäger-Division) was a light infantry formation of the German Army during World War II. It can trace its origins to the 187th Infantry Division which was based in Austria until September 1942, when it was redesignated as the 187th Reserve Division. The 187th was sent to Croatia and was redesignated the 42nd Jäger Division in January 1944. 42. Jäger-Division was formed 22 Dec 1943 in Croatia from the 187. Reserve-Division. After taking part in Operation Margarthe, (the military occupation of Hungary) in March 1944, it returned to Yugoslavia in May where it took part in combat operations against Yugoslav Partisans. In July 1944 the division was transferred to Italy and saw action in the Italian campaign. It remained in Italy for the rest of the war and surrendered in April 1945.

== Background ==
The main purpose of the German Jäger Divisions was to fight in adverse terrain where smaller, coordinated formations were more facilely combat capable than the brute force offered by the standard infantry divisions. The Jäger divisions were more heavily equipped than their 'mountain' counterparts, but not as well armed as a larger infantry division. In the early stages of the war, they were the interface divisions fighting in rough terrain and foothills as well as urban areas, between the mountains and the plains. The Jägers (meaning hunters in German) relied on a high degree of training and slightly superior communications, as well as their not inconsiderable artillery support. In the middle stages of the war, as the standard infantry divisions were downsized, the Jäger structure of divisions with two infantry regiments, became the standard table of organization.

Adolf Hitler declared that all infantry divisions were to be Grenadier Divisions in 1943 except for his elite Jäger and Mountain Jaeger divisions.

== War crimes ==
The division is one of several implicated in the Ronchidoso massacre, Emilia-Romagna between 28 and 30 November 1944, when 66 civilians were executed.

== Commanders ==
- General der Infanterie Walther Graeßner (15 October 1939 - 6 February 1940)
- Generalleutnant Konrad Stephanus (7 February 1940 - 15 August 1942)
- Generalleutnant Josef Brauner von Haydringen (15 August 1942 - 26 April 1944)
- Generalleutnant Walter Jost (26 April 1944 - 24 April 1945)

== Area of operations ==
As 187th Division
Austria (October 1939 - August 1942)

As 187th Reserve Division
Austria (August 1942 - September 1942)
Croatia (September 1942 - January 1944)

As 42nd Jäger Division
Croatia (January 1944 - March 1944)
Hungary (March 1944 - May 1944)
Yugoslavia (May 1944 - July 1944)
Italy (July 1944 - April 1945)

== Order of battle (1944) ==
- Jäger Regiment 25
- Jäger Regiment 40
- Reconnaissance Battalion 142
- Artillery Regiment 142
- Pioneer Battalion 142
- Panzerjäger (anti-tank) Kompanie 142
- Mountain Flak Kompanie 142
- Signals Battalion 142
- Feldersatz Battalion 142
- Versorgungseinheiten 142
