= Carl Becker (general) =

German general (1895–1966)

- Born: 16 January 1895; Varel
- Died: 24 March 1966 (aged 71); Heidelberg
- Military career
- Allegiance: Nazi Germany
- Branch: Army
- Rank: Generalleutnant
- Commands: 2nd Luftwaffe Field Division; 253d Infantry Division
- Conflicts: Prague Offensive
- Awards: Knight's Cross of the Iron Cross with Oak Leaves

Carl Becker (16 January 1895 – 24 March 1966) was a German general during World War II, who commanded several divisions. He was a recipient of the Knight's Cross of the Iron Cross with Oak Leaves of Nazi Germany.

Arning surrendered to the Red Army troops in the course of the Soviet Prague Offensive in 1945. Convicted in the Soviet Union as a war criminal, he was held until 1955.

Becker belonged to the generation of military officers of the First World War, which largely corresponded with parts of the Nazi ideology prevailed and in the second half of World War II became an important pillar of the military system.

== Awards and decorations ==
- Iron Cross (1914) 2nd Class (23 July 1915) & 1st Class (17 June 1917)
- Clasp to the Iron Cross (1939) 2nd Class (12 October 1939) & 1st Class (10 June 1940)
- Honour Roll Clasp of the Army (29 September 1941)
- German Cross in Gold on 18 October 1941 as Oberst in Infanterie-Regiment 18
- Knight's Cross of the Iron Cross with Oak Leaves
  - Knight's Cross on 29 October 1942 as Oberst and commander of Infanterie-Regiment 18
  - 829th Oak Leaves on 14 April 1945 as Generalleutnant and commander of 253. Infanterie-Division

Military offices
Preceded by Oberst Hellmuth Petzold	Commander of 2nd Luftwaffe Field Division; 1 January 1943 - 17 January 1943	Succeeded by Oberst Hellmuth Petzold
Preceded by General der Infanterie Otto Schellert	Commander of 253. Infanterie-Division; 18 January 1943 - 17 June 1944	Succeeded by Generalleutnant Hans Junck
Preceded by Generalleutnant Hans Junck	Commander of 253. Infanterie-Division; 28 June 1944 - 5 May 1945	Succeeded by Generalmajor Joachim von Schwatlo-Gesterding
