= Georg Heinrici =

German Protestant theologian (1844–1915)

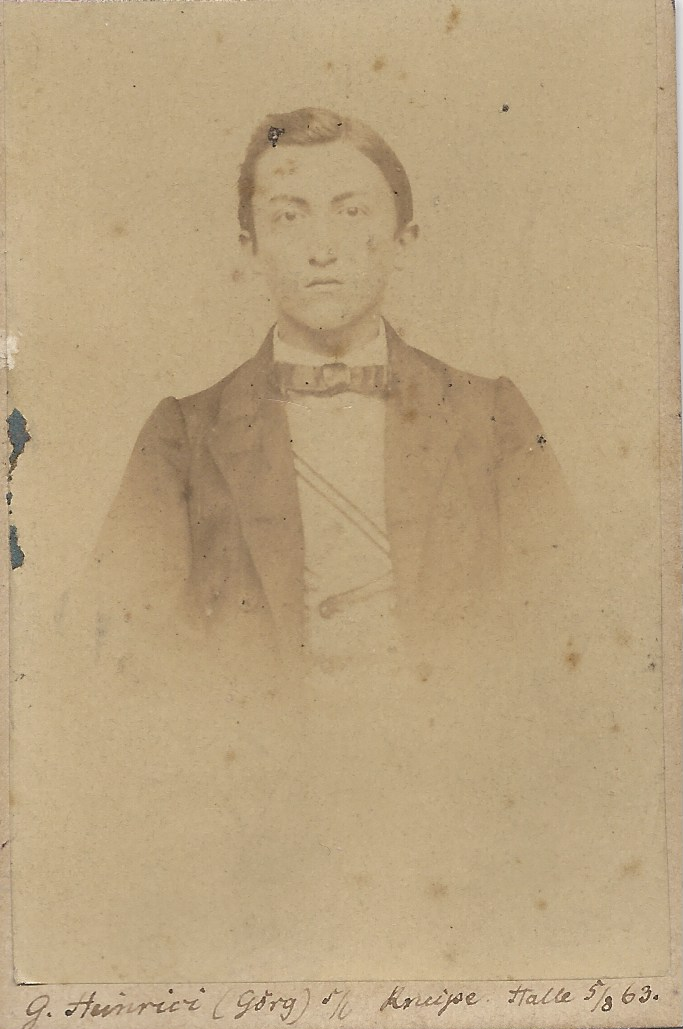
- Born: 14 March 1844; Karkeln, Province of Prussia, Prussia (today Mysovka, Slavsky District, Kaliningrad Oblast, Russia
- Died: 29 September 1915 (aged 71); Leipzig, German Empire
- Other names: Heinrici, Carl Friedrich Georg
- Occupation: Lutheran theologian
- Relatives: Gotthard Heinrici (nephew); Gerd von Rundstedt (cousin)

Carl Friedrich Georg Heinrici (14 March 1844– 29 September 1915) was a German Lutheran theologian best known for his studies involving the relationship of early Christianity with its Greek environment.

== Biography ==
From 1862 to 1867 he studied theology and philosophy at the universities of Halle-Wittenberg and Berlin. In 1873 he became an associate professor of New Testament exegesis at the University of Marburg, where during the following year, he attained a full professorship. In 1892 he succeeded Theodor Zahn as professor of New Testament exegesis at the University of Leipzig, where in 1911/12 he served as rector. From 1892 to 1914 he was director of the Neutestamentarisch-exegetischen Seminar at Leipzig.

== Selected works ==
- Die Valentinianische Gnosis und die heilige Schrift; eine Studie, 1871 – Valentinian gnosis and the Holy Scriptures.
- Das erste Sendschreiben das Apostel Paulus an die Korinthier, 1880 – The first epistle of Saint Paul to the Corinthians.
- Das zweite Sendschreiben des Apostel Paulus an die Korinthier, 1887 – The second epistle of Saint Paul to the Corinthians.
- Theologische encyklopädie, 1893 – Theological encyclopedia.
- Das Urchristentum, 1902 – Early Christianity.
- Die Bergpredigt (Matth. 5-7. Luk. 6, 20-49) Begriffsgeschichtlich untersucht, 1905 – The Sermon on the Mount, a conceptual history.
- Hellenismus und Christentum, 1909 – Hellenism and Christianity.
- Die Eigenart des Christentums, 1911 – The uniqueness of Christianity.
- Die Hermes-mystik und das Neue Testament, 1918 – Hermeticism and the New Testament.
