= Walther Graeßner =

German general and Knight's Cross recipient (1891–1943)

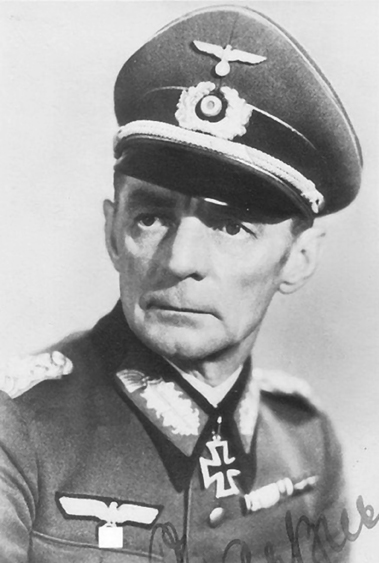
- Born: 31 January 1891
- Died: 16 July 1943 (aged 52)
- Military career
- Allegiance: Nazi Germany
- Branch: Army (Wehrmacht)
- Rank: General of the Infantry
- Commands: 42nd Jäger Division; 298. Infanterie-Division; XII Army Corps
- Conflicts: World War II
- Awards: Knight's Cross of the Iron Cross

Walther Graeßner (31 January 1891 – 16 July 1943) was a German general in the Wehrmacht during World War II who commanded the XII Army Corps. He was a recipient of the Knight's Cross of the Iron Cross. Graeßner was wounded in mid-February and later died of his wounds on 16 July 1943.

== Awards and decorations ==
- Knight's Cross of the Iron Cross on 27 October 1941 as Generalleutnant and commander of 298. Infanterie-Division

Military offices
Preceded by none	Commander of 187. Infanterie-Division; 15 October 1939 - 6 February 1940	Succeeded by Generalleutnant Konrad Stephanus
Preceded by none	Commander of 298. Infanterie-Division; 6 February 1940 - 1 January 1942	Succeeded by Generalleutnant Arnold Szelinski
Preceded by General der Infanterie Walther Schroth	Commander of XII. Armeekorps; 19 February 1942 - 18 February 1943	Succeeded by General der Infanterie Kurt von Tippelskirch
