= Bogachyovo =

Bogachyovo Богачёво
- Village
- Location within Bashkortostan Location within Russia
- Coordinates: 52°23′N 58°16′E
- Country: Russia
- Region: Bashkortostan
- District: Baymaksky District

Population (2010)
  - Total: 254
- Time zone: UTC+5:00

Bogachyovo (Russian: Богачёво) is a rural locality (a village) in Ishmurzinsky Selsoviet, Baymaksky District, Bashkortostan, Russia. The population was 254 as of 2010. There are 2 streets.

== Geography ==
Bogachyovo is located 25 km south of Baymak (the district's administrative centre) by road. Pervomayskoye is the nearest rural locality.
