= Głębowice, Lower Silesian Voivodeship =

Głębowice
- Village
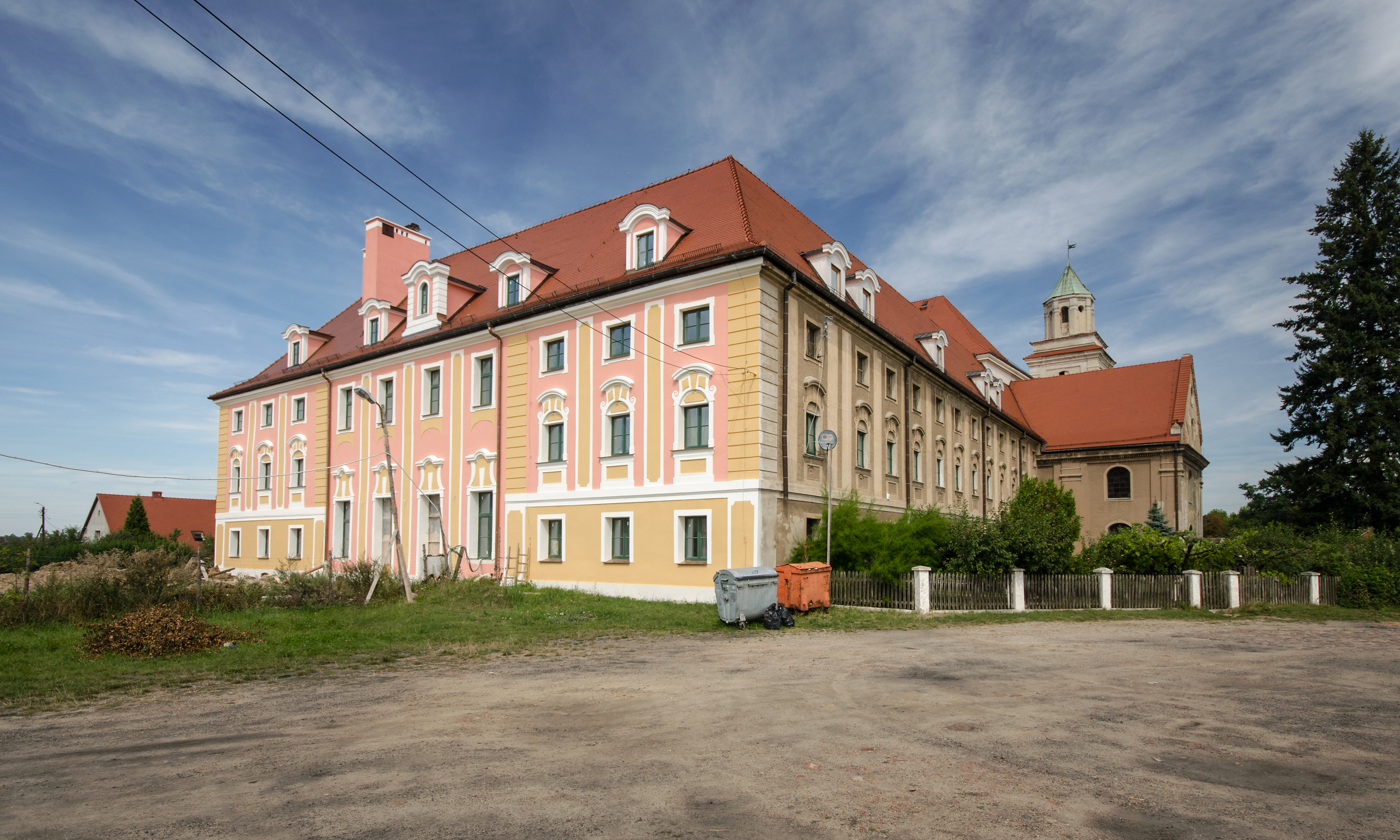
- Monastery

- Location within Poland
- Coordinates: 51°26′53″N 16°44′14″E
- Country: Poland
- Voivodeship: Lower Silesian
- County: Wołów
- Gmina: Wińsko
- Population: 520

Głębowice [ɡwɛmbɔˈvit͡sɛ] is a village in the administrative district of Gmina Wińsko, within Wołów County, Lower Silesian Voivodeship, in south-western Poland.

== Notable residents ==
- Walther Schroth (1882–1944), Wehrmacht general
