= Walther Schroth =

German general (1882–1944)

- Born: 3 June 1882; Glumbowitz, German Empire
- Died: 6 October 1944 (aged 62); Wiesbaden, Nazi Germany
- Military career
- Allegiance: German Empire (to 1918); Weimar Republic (to 1933); Nazi Germany
- Branch: Imperial German Army; Reichswehr; Army (Wehrmacht)
- Service years: 1902–1944
- Rank: General of the Infantry
- Commands: 1st Infantry Division; XII Army Corps
- Conflicts: World War I World War II
- Awards: Knight's Cross of the Iron Cross

Walther Schroth (3 June 1882 – 6 October 1944) was a general in the Wehrmacht of Nazi Germany during World War II. He was a recipient of the Knight's Cross of the Iron Cross.

Schroth was born at Glumbowitz (today, Głębowice, Lower Silesian Voivodeship) in 1882, and he entered the Royal Prussian Army in 1902. He served in World War I and, at the end of the war, he was a Hauptmann and chief of staff in the 80th Reserve Division. He remained in the peacetime Reichswehr as a career officer. He was promoted to General der Infanterie in February 1938 and commanded the XII Army Corps from then until February 1942. He next commanded the IV Replacement Army Corps at Dresden until May 1943 and the XII Replacement Army Corps at Wiesbaden until his death in October 1944.

Schroth served on the "Court of Military Honour," a drumhead court-martial that expelled from the Army many of the officers involved in the 20 July Plot before handing them over to the People's Court for prosecution. Schroth died in an auto accident in October 1944.

== Awards and decorations ==
- Iron Cross (1914) 2nd and 1st class
- Knight's Cross of the House Order of Hohenzollern with swords
- Cross of Honour 3rd Class of the House Order of Hohenzollern with swords
- Military Merit Order of Bavaria, 4th class with swords
- Knight's Cross 1st class with swords of the Albert Order
- Knight's Cross 1st class with swords of the Friedrich Order
- Hanseatic Cross of Hamburg
- Honour Cross of the World War 1914/1918
- Clasp to the Iron Cross (1939) 2nd and 1st class
- Knight's Cross of the Iron Cross on 9 July 1941 as General der Infanterie and commander of XII. Armeekorps
- War Merit Cross, 1st and 2nd class with swords
- Infantry Assault Badge
- Wound Badge (1939) in gold

Military offices
Preceded by Generalmajor Georg von Küchler	Commander of 1. Infanterie-Division; 1 April 1935 – 1 January 1938	Succeeded by Generalleutnant Joachim von Kortzfleisch
Preceded by None	Commander of XII. Armeekorps; 4 February 1938 – 9 April 1940	Succeeded by Generaloberst Gotthard Heinrici
Preceded by Generaloberst Gotthard Heinrici	Commander of XII. Armeekorps; 17 June 1940 – 19 February 1942	Succeeded by General der Infanterie Walther Graeßner
