= 4th Army (Wehrmacht) =

- German: 4. Armee
- 4th Army Insignia
- Active: 1939–45
- Country: Nazi Germany
- Branch: German army ( Wehrmacht)
- Type: Field army
- Size: 165,000 (June 1944); 60,000 (March 1945)
- Engagements: World War II: Invasion of Poland; Battle of France; Battle of Białystok–Minsk; Battle of Smolensk; Battle of Moscow; Operation Büffel; East Prussian Offensive

The 4th Army (German: 4. Armee) was a field army of the Wehrmacht during World War II.

== Invasions of Poland and France ==
The 4th Army was activated on 1 August 1939 with General Günther von Kluge in command. It took part in the Invasion of Poland of September 1939 as part of Army Group North, which was under Field Marshal Fedor von Bock. The 4th Army contained the II Corps and III Corps, each with two infantry divisions, the XIX Corps with two motorized and one panzer divisions, and three other divisions, including two in reserve. Its objective was to capture the Polish Corridor, thus linking mainland Germany with East Prussia.

During the attack on the Low Countries and France, the 4th Army, as part of Field Marshal Gerd von Rundstedt's Army Group A, invaded Belgium from the Rhineland. Along with other German armies, the 4th Army penetrated the Dyle Line and completed the trapping of the Allied forces in France.

During the Western Campaign, the 4th Army was at the center of an organizational dispute between Army Group A, Army Group B, the Army High Command (OKH) and Adolf Hitler. The commander-in-chief of the army, Walther von Brauchitsch, was dissatisfied with the size and leadership style of Army Group A, especially its commander Rundstedt; on May 23, 1940, the OKH ordered that the 4th Army should be subordinated to Army Group B from 20:00 on the following day. As a result of this order, Rundstedt would have lost all the armored units (Panzer Group Kleist, Panzer Group Guderian) of his army group. According to the OKH's concept, Army Group B was subsequently to be utilized for the reduction of the Dunkirk sector of the front and Army Group A merely for flank security. When Hitler arrived at the headquarters of Army Group A near Charleville on the morning of May 24 and learned of the OKH's order, he immediately suspended it. The 4th Army remained with Army Group A, followed at 12:45 by the famous halting order, according to which the attack on the encircled Allied troops at Dunkirk was to be delayed until the infantry units (II Corps, VIII Corps) had caught up.

The then Major-General Erwin Rommel, who was under Kluge, contributed immensely to the victory of 4th Army. Kluge, who had been General of the Artillery, was promoted to Field Marshal along with many others on 19 July 1940.

== Operation Barbarossa ==
The 4th Army took part in Operation Barbarossa in 1941 as part of Fedor von Bock's Army Group Center and took part in the Battle of Minsk and the Battle of Smolensk. In the aftermath of the German failure in the Battle of Moscow, Fedor von Bock was relieved of his command of Army Group Center on 18 December. Kluge was promoted to replace him. General Ludwig Kübler assumed command of the 4th Army.

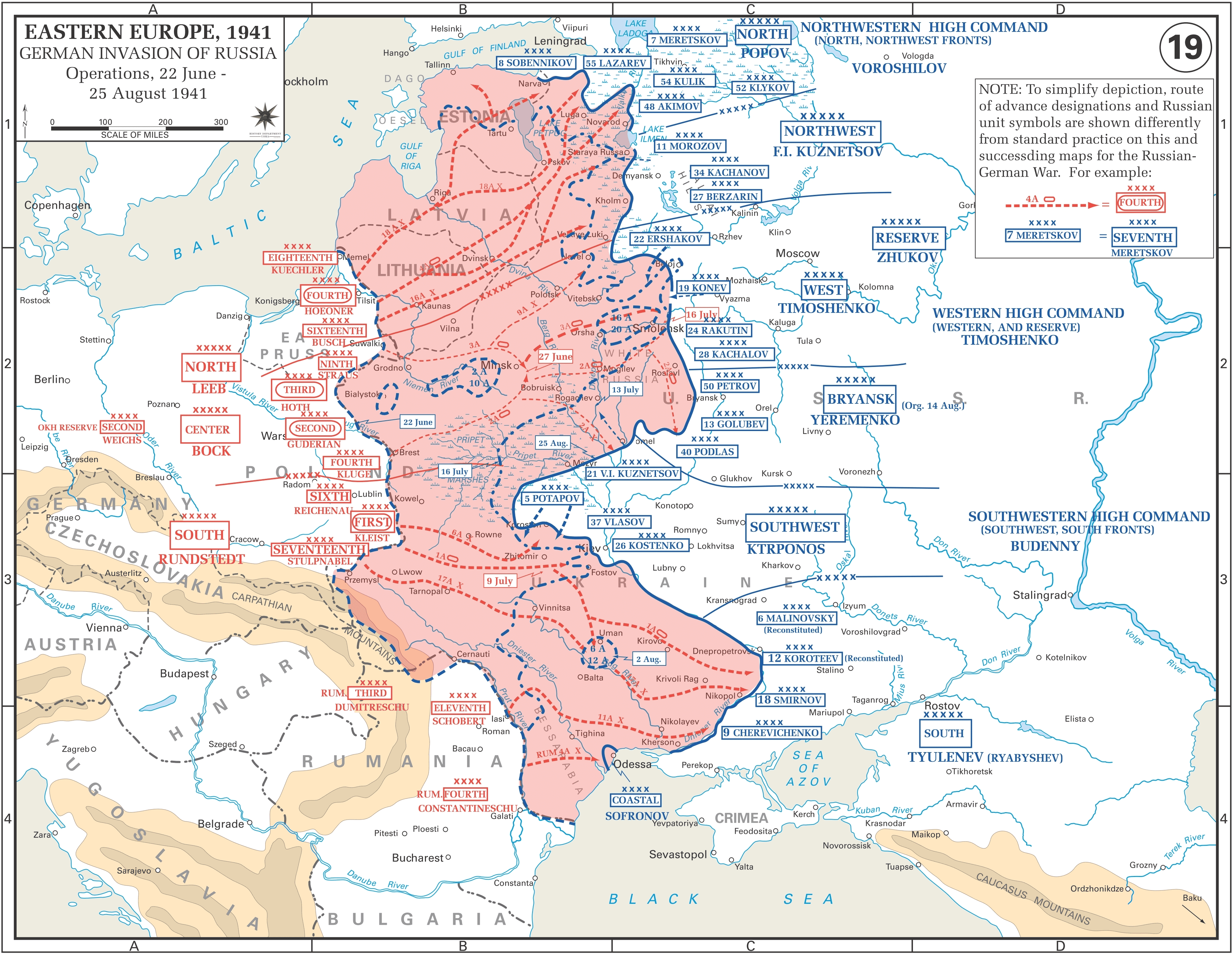
Position of 4. Armee (Kluge) at the opening phase of Operation Barbarossa

After the launching of Operation Blue, the 4th Army and the entire Army Group Center did not see much action, as troops were concentrated to the south. From 1943 on, the 4th Army was in retreat along with other formations of Army Group Center. The Red Army's campaign of autumn 1943, Operation Suvorov (also known as the "battle of the highways"), saw the 4th Army pushed back towards Orsha. Between October and the first week of December, Western Front had tried four times to take Orsha and had been beaten off in furious battles by Fourth Army.

In 1944, the 4th Army was holding defensive positions east of Orsha and Mogilev in the Belorussian SSR, occupying a bulging, 25- by 80-mile bridgehead east of the Dnepr. The Soviet summer offensive of that year, Operation Bagration, commencing on 22 June, proved disastrous for the Wehrmacht, including the 4th Army. It was encircled east of Minsk and lost 130,000 men in 12 days since the start of Bagration. Few units were able to escape westwards; after the battles in the rest of the summer, the army required complete rebuilding. During late 1944–45 the 4th Army, now under the command of Friedrich Hoßbach, was tasked with holding the borders of East Prussia. On the first week in November in Gumbinnen Operation, the 4th Army pushed back the Soviet forces in the Gumbinnen sector off all but a fifteen-mile by fifty-mile strip of East Prussian territory.

== East Prussian Offensive ==
The Soviet East Prussian Offensive, commencing on 13 January, saw the 2nd Army driven steadily backwards towards the Baltic coast over a period of two weeks and 4th Army threatened with encirclement. Hoßbach, with the Army Group Centre's commander Georg-Hans Reinhardt's concurrence, attempted to break out of East Prussia by attacking towards Elbing; but the attack was driven back and the 4th Army was again encircled in what became known as the Heiligenbeil pocket. For defying their orders, both Hoßbach and Reinhardt were relieved of command.

By 13 February, 3rd Belorussian Front had pushed 4th Army out of the Heilsberg triangle. After 13 March 3rd Belorussian Front had pushed 4th Army into a ten by two mile beachhead west of Heiligenbeil before Hitler finally allowed the army to retreat across the Frisches Haff to the Frische Nehrung on 29 March. After Königsberg fell, Hitler sent Headquarters, 4th Army, out of East Prussia and merged its units with 2nd Army to form the East Prussian Army Group, commanded by Dietrich von Saucken, which surrendered to the Red Army at the end of the war in May. Meanwhile, the Headquarters, 4th Army became Headquarters, 21st Army.

== Commanders ==
No.	Portrait	Commander	Took office	Left office	Time in office
1	Günther von Kluge	Generalfeldmarschall; Günther von Kluge (1882–1944)	1 August 1939	19 December 1941	2 years, 140 days
2	Ludwig Kübler	General der Gebirgstruppe; Ludwig Kübler (1889–1947)	19 December 1941	20 January 1942	32 days
3	Gotthard Heinrici	General der Infanterie; Gotthard Heinrici (1886–1971)	20 January 1942	6 June 1942	137 days
4	Hans von Salmuth	Generaloberst; Hans von Salmuth (1888–1962)	6 June 1942	15 July 1942	39 days
(3)	Gotthard Heinrici	Generaloberst; Gotthard Heinrici (1886–1971)	15 July 1942	? June 1943	10 months
(4)	Hans von Salmuth	Generaloberst; Hans von Salmuth (1888–1962)	? June 1943	31 July 1943	1 month
(3)	Gotthard Heinrici	Generaloberst; Gotthard Heinrici (1886–1971)	31 July 1943	4 June 1944	309 days
5	Kurt von Tippelskirch	General der Infanterie; Kurt von Tippelskirch (1891–1957)	4 June 1944	30 June 1944	26 days
6	Vincenz Müller	Generalleutnant; Vincenz Müller (1894–1961)	30 June 1944	7 July 1944	7 days
(5)	Kurt von Tippelskirch	General der Infanterie; Kurt von Tippelskirch (1891–1957)	7 July 1944	18 July 1944	11 days
7	Friedrich Hossbach	General der Infanterie; Friedrich Hossbach (1894–1980)	18 July 1944	29 January 1945	195 days
8	Friedrich-Wilhelm Müller	General der Infanterie; Friedrich-Wilhelm Müller (1897–1947)	29 January 1945	27 April 1945	88 days

== See also ==
- 4th Army (German Empire) for the WW I German Army formation.

== Bibliography ==
- Ziemke, Earl F. (2002). Stalingrad to Berlin: The German Defeat in the East. Washington D.C.: Center of Military History, US Army. ISBN 9781780392875. Archived from the original on 11 January 2012.
- Glantz, David; House, Jonathan (2015). When Titans Clashed: How the Red Army Stopped Hitler. University Press of Kansas. ISBN 9780700621217.
