= Heiligenbeil =

The term Heiligenbeil can refer to:

- The German name of Mamonovo, Russia
- Heiligenbeil concentration camp built near Mamonovo
- Heiligenbeil Pocket, part of the Eastern Front of World War II
