= Franz Griesbach =

German general (1892–1984)

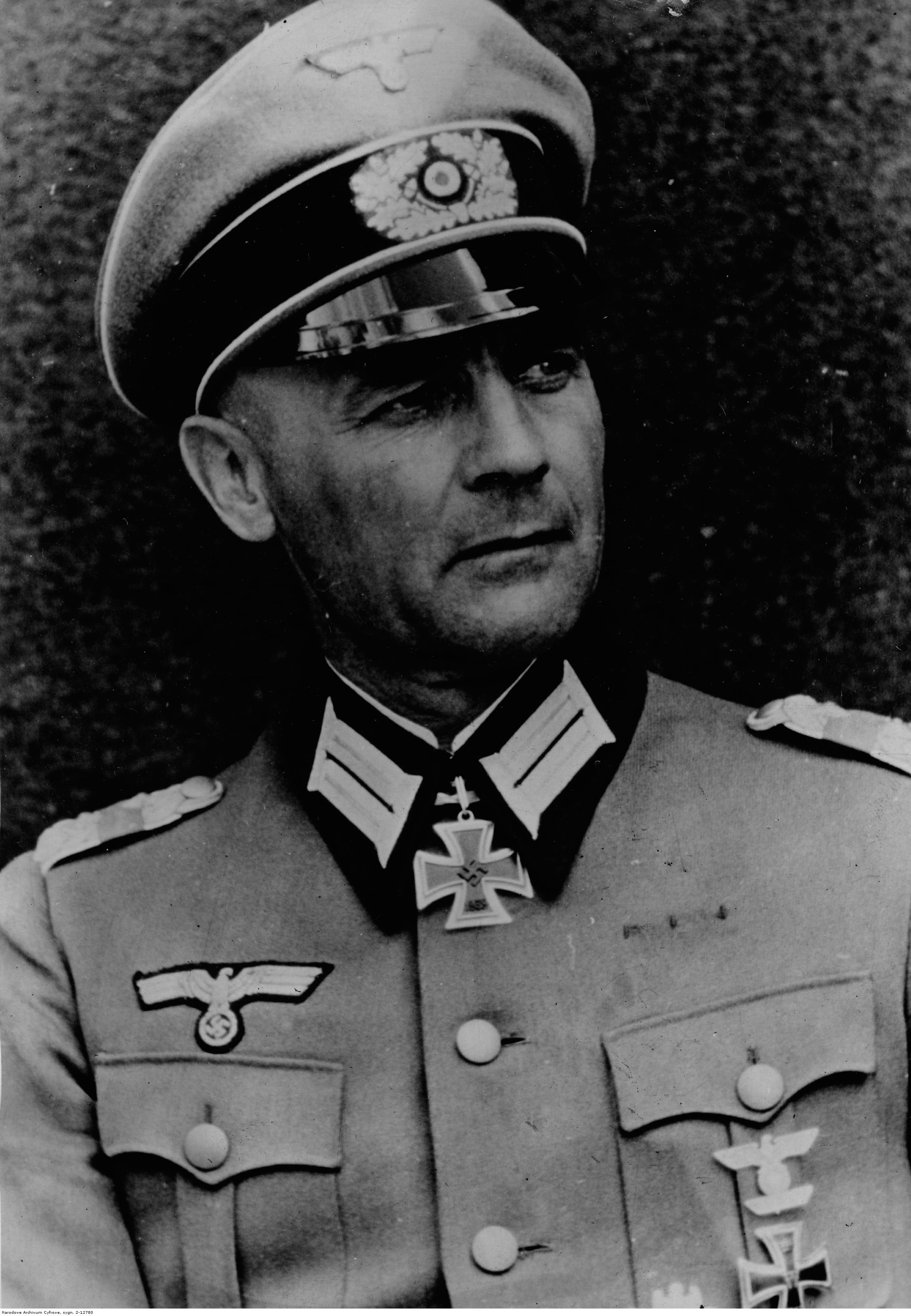
- Born: 21 December 1892; Brück in der Mark, Kreis Zauch-Belzig, Regierungsbezirk Potsdam, Province of Brandenburg, Kingdom of Prussia, German Empire
- Died: 24 September 1984 (aged 91); Lage, North Rhine-Westphalia, West Germany
- Relatives: ∞ 1921 Martha Matthes (1893–1940), 2 sons ∞ 1942 Gertrud Murmann
- Military career
- Allegiance: German Empire; Weimar Republic; Nazi Germany
- Branch: Imperial German Army; German Army
- Rank: Generalmajor
- Commands: Infanterie-Ersatz-Bataillon 467; I./Infanterie-Regiment 589; I./Infanterie-Regiment 391; Grenadier-Regiment 399
- Conflicts: World War I World War II
- Awards: Knight's Cross of the Iron Cross with Oak Leaves and Swords
- Other work: Teacher

Franz Friedrich Johann Griesbach (21 December 1892 – 24 September 1984) was a German officer, veteran of WWI, teacher from 1919 to 1939 and general during World War II. He was a recipient of the Knight's Cross of the Iron Cross with Oak Leaves and Swords of Nazi Germany.

== Promotions ==
- 1 April 1914 One-year volunteer (Einjährig-Freiwilliger)
- 6 September 1914 Gefreiter (Private E-2 / Lance Corporal)
- 29 December 1914 Unteroffizier (NCO / Corporal / Junior Sergeant)
- 10 May 1916 Vizefeldwebel (Vice Sergeant)
- 23 August 1916 Leutnant der Reserve (2nd Lieutenant of the Reserves)

=== Wehrmacht ===
- 1 April 1936 Leutnant der Reserve (2nd Lieutenant of the Reserves) with Rank Seniority (RDA) from 30 December 1919 (2)
- 21 February 1938 Oberleutnant der Reserve (1st Lieutenant of the Reserves) with effect from 1 March 1938 and Rank Seniority (RDA) from 1 May 1937 (341)
- 1 June 1939 Hauptmann (E); Ergänzungsoffizier (Captain; Supplementary Officer) with effect from 1 March 1939 and Rank Seniority (RDA) from 1 May 1934 (188b)
- 20 October 1940 Major (E); Ergänzungsoffizier (Major; Supplementary Officer) with effect from 1 August 1940 (86a)
  - 30 December 1941 transferred to the active officers as Major (Tr.O.) with effect from 1 December 1941 and RDA from 1 August 1940 (121)
- 20 April 1942 Oberstleutnant (Lieutenant Colonel) with effect and RDA from 1 April 1942 (211a)
- 10 March 1943 Oberst (Colonel) with effect from 1 January 1943 and RDA from 1 December 1942 (67b)
- 1 August 1944 Generalmajor (Major General)

== Awards and decorations ==
- Iron Cross (1914), 2nd and 1st Class
  - 2nd Class on 22 December 1914
  - 1st Class on 23 August 1917
- Wound Badge (1918) in Black and Silver
  - Black on 5 May 1918
  - Silver (Mattweiß) on 25 June 1918
- Honour Cross of the World War 1914/1918 with Swords on 12 December 1934
- Wehrmacht Long Service Award, 4th Class
- War Merit Cross (1939), 2nd Class with Swords on 1 September 1941
- Repetition Clasp 1939 to the Iron Cross 1914, 2nd and 1st Class
  - 2nd Class on 22 October 1941
  - 1st Class on 20 November 1941
- Infantry Assault Badge in Silver on 19 December 1941
- Wound Badge (1939) in Gold on 4 February 1942
- Order of the Crown of Romania, Officer's Cross with Swords on 6 March 1942
- Winter Battle in the East 1941–42 Medal on 16 August 1942
- Crimea Shield
- Romanian Commemorative Medal for the Crusade Against Communism
- Knight's Cross of the Iron Cross with Oak Leaves and Swords
  - Knight's Cross on 14 March 1942 as Major and commander of the I. Battalion/Infanterie-Regiment 391
  - 242nd Oak Leaves on 17 May 1943 as Oberst and commander of the Grenadier-Regiment 399
  - 53rd Swords on 6 March 1944 as Oberst and commander of the Grenadier-Regiment 399

Military offices
Preceded by Generalleutnant Walther Krause	Commander of 170. Infanterie-Division; 15 February 1944 – 16 February 1944	Succeeded by Generalleutnant Siegfried Haß
