= Soth =

- Pronunciation: English: /ˈsoʊθ/ Khmer: [sot]

Origin
- Meaning: English: "truth", "justice" Khmer: "clean", "pure", "white"

Other names
- Variant form: Sooth

Soth is a surname in various cultures, as well as a given name in Southeast Asia.

== Origins ==
As a Khmer name (Khmer: សុទ្ធ, Sŏtth [sot]), Soth originates from a word meaning "clean", "pure", or "white". That word originated from Sanskrit śuddha. The English surname Soth comes from Middle English soth meaning "truth" or "justice", and can be found in records in England dating back to the 13th century.

== Statistics ==
The 2010 United States census found 662 people with the surname Soth, making it the 34,272nd-most-common name in the country. This represented an increase from 621 (34,503rd-most-common) in the 2000 Census. In the 2010 census, slightly more than three-fifths of the bearers of the surname identified as Asian, and one-third as White.

== Surname ==
- Alec Soth (born 1969), American photographer
- Lauren K. Soth (1910–1998), American journalist
- Bob Soth (born 1933), American long-distance runner
- Soth Polin (born 1943), Cambodian writer
- Soth Sun (born 1946), Cambodian boxer
- Wilhelm Söth – (1903 - 1978) German general

Fictional characters:

- Lord Soth, in Dragonlance and Ravenloft
- Norman Soth, in the video game Tom Clancy's Splinter Cell

== Given name ==
- Soth Phetrasy (1915–2004), Lao Pathet official
- Chea Soth (1928–2012), Cambodian politician, MP for Prey Veng Province
- Mom Soth, Cambodian actor

== See also ==
- Wilhelm Söth (1903–1978), German general of World War II
