= Siegfried Haß =

- Born: 7 June 1898
- Died: 14 December 1987 (aged 89)
- Military career
- Allegiance: German Empire; Weimar Republic; Nazi Germany
- Branch: German Army
- Service years: 1916–1945
- Rank: Generalleutnant
- Commands: 170th Infantry Division
- Conflicts: World War I; World War II; Battle of Belgium; Battle of France; Operation Barbarossa; Battle of Uman; Battle of Kiev (1941); Battle of Rostov (1942); Battle of the Caucasus; Lower Dnieper Offensive; Battle of Narva (1944); Operation Bagration; Vilnius Offensive; East Prussian Offensive; Heiligenbeil Pocket
- Awards: Knight's Cross of the Iron Cross

Siegfried Haß (7 June 1898 – 14 December 1987) was a general in the Wehrmacht of Nazi Germany during World War II who commanded several divisions. He was a recipient of the Knight's Cross of the Iron Cross.

== Awards and decorations ==
- Knight's Cross of the Iron Cross on 18 February 1945 as Generalleutnant and commander of 170. Infanterie-Division

Military offices
Preceded by Generalmajor Franz Griesbach	Commander of 170. Infanterie-Division; 16 February 1944 – 8 May 1945	Succeeded by None
