= Fallschirm-Panzergrenadier Division 2 Hermann Göring =

2nd Paratroop Panzergrenadier Division Hermann Göring
- Fallschirm-Panzergrenadier-Division 2. Hermann Göring
- Active: October 1944 – 1945
- Country: Nazi Germany
- Branch: Luftwaffe
- Type: Fallschirmjäger; Panzergrenadier
- Role: Airborne forces Mechanized infantry
- Size: Division
- Patron: Hermann Göring
- Engagements: World War II

Insignia
- Identification symbol: Fallschirm-PzG-Div 2 HG
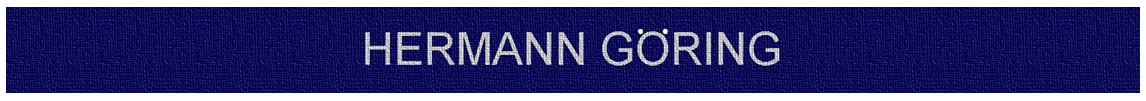
- Cuff title Hermann Göring

Fallschirm-Panzergrenadier-Division 2 "Hermann Göring" was a German military unit formed on 24 September 1944 in the area of Radom. It subsequently was joined with the Fallschirm-Panzer Division 1 Hermann Göring to form the Fallschirm Panzer Corps Hermann Göring. After heavy fighting against the Red Army in Prussia, Pomerania, Silesia, and Saxony, the Corps surrendered to Soviet troops on May 8, 1945.

== History ==
The Fallschirm-Panzerkorps Hermann Göring was activated in early October 1944, and the Fallschirm-Panzergrenadier Division 2 Hermann Göring, along with its sister Panzer division, Hermann Göring Panzer Division, was transferred to the command of the corps. The Panzerkorps was then transferred to the East Prussia–Kurland region to halt the Soviet offensive which had already achieved the isolation of Army Group North in the Kurland Pocket and was now aimed at the capture of East Prussia. The Panzerkorps was involved in heavy defensive fighting near Gumbinnen, and when the Soviet assault petered out in late November, the Panzerkorps set up static defensive lines.

The massive Soviet Vistula-Oder Offensive trapped the Hermann Göring Panzerkorps in the Heiligenbeil Pocket along with the rest of the 4th Army. In February, the Heer's élite Großdeutschland Panzergrenadier Division was attached to the corps.

Despite several breakout attempts, the Panzerkorps had to be evacuated by sea to Swinemünde in Pomerania. Upon landing, it was thrown back into combat, defending the Oder-Neisse line against Soviet attacks through mid-March. To bolster the corps' strength, the elite Brandenburg Panzergrenadier Division was attached to the unit.

In April, the remnants of the Hermann Göring Panzerkorps was sent to Silesia, and in heavy fighting was slowly pushed back into Saxony. On April 22, the Fallschirm-Panzer-Division 1. Hermann Göring was one of two divisions that broke through the inter-army boundary of the Polish 2nd Army (Polish People's Army or LWP) and the Soviet 52nd Army, in an action near Bautzen, destroying parts of their communications and logistics trains and severely damaging the Polish (LWP) 5th Infantry Division and 16th Tank Brigade before being stopped two days later.

By early May, the Panzerkorps was positioned near the Saxon capitol of Dresden. The remains of the corps began breakout attempts to the west, in order to surrender to the Americans who were currently halted on the Elbe. Despite breakout attempts, the corps was encircled, and although several small groups successfully made it through to the west, the majority of the corps surrendered to the Soviets on 8 May 1945.

== Commanding officers ==
- Generalmajor Erich Walther, 24 September – November 1944
- Oberst Wilhelm Söth, November 1944 – January 1945
- Oberst Georg Seegers (Army), February – March 1945
- Oberst Helmuth Hufenbach, March 1945 – 27 March 1945
- Generalmajor Erich Walther, March – May 1945
