= Henning Schindekop =

Teutonic Knight

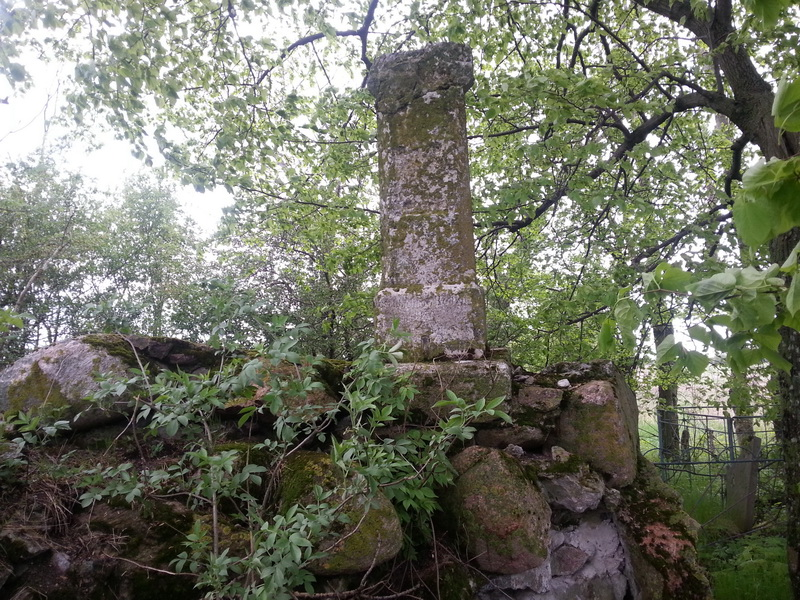
Henning Schindekopf's tombstone

Henning Schindekop (also Schindekopf) (c. 1330 – 17 February 1370) was a high-ranking official of the Teutonic Knights.

A native of Westphalia in the Holy Roman Empire, Schindekop was mentioned as a Teutonic brother in Königsberg in 1348. Two years later he was documented as the Komtur of Ragnit (Neman) and participated in campaigns against Samogitia and the Grand Duchy of Lithuania. Schindekop was appointed Komtur of Balga in 1354, a position which allowed him to grant town rights to Rastenburg (Kętrzyn) in 1357. Grand Master Winrich von Kniprode promoted Schindekop to the positions of Ordensmarschall and Komtur of Königsberg in 1359 or 1360. Schindekop died from a spear-wound during the Battle of Rudau in 1370; Hans von Sagan allegedly rallied the Teutonic forces to victory after Schindekop fell in combat.

A monument was built where he fell at Rudau to commemorate Schindekop. Quednau Church contained armor which allegedly belonged to him. The street Schindekop-Straße in the Königsberg districts of Vorderhufen and Tragheimsdorf was named after the knight. The poet Agnes Miegel also wrote a ballad about him.
