= Vaišvila =

Vaišvila is a Lithuanian surname. Notable people with the surname include:

- Rytis Vaišvila (born 1971), Lithuanian basketball player and coach
- Zigmas Vaišvila (born 1956), Lithuanian politician

== See also ==
- Vaišvilas
