= Hans von Sagan =

Hans von Sagan was a heroic figure from East Prussian folklore.

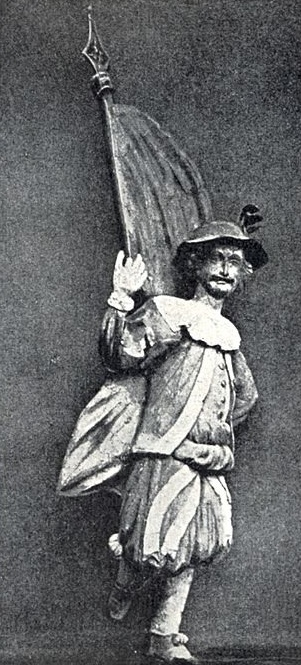
The statue of Hans von Sagan that once stood in Königsberg.

Hans was said to be a journeyman shoemaker from the Königsberg town of Kneiphof. At a crucial point during the 1370 Battle of Rudau between the Teutonic Knights and the Grand Duchy of Lithuania, Hans picked up the fallen standard of Henning Schindekop and rallied the Teutonic forces to victory. When Grand Master Winrich von Kniprode asked Hans what he would like for a reward, the shoemaker requested that the burghers of Kneiphof annually receive beer from Königsberg Castle. This beer, traditionally granted on Ascension Day, became popularly known through Königsberg as Schmeckbier.

The Hans-Sagan-Denkmal was a memorial built before Kneiphof Town Hall, while an image of Hans was also used as a weathervane atop Königsberg Castle. The street Hans-Sagan-Straße ran from Stresemannstraße to Samitter Alle in Königsberg's northern Tragheimer Palve district. In the 1870s a lifesize statue of Hans von Sagan was built before a shoemaker's house near Bremen town hall. Like Hans Sachs and St. Crispin Hans von Sagan is a figure of identification of the shoemaker's guild.

The inspiration for Hans von Sagan was probably Duke Balthasar of Sagan, who led auxiliary troops of the Teutonic Knights against rebellious Kneiphof in 1455 during the Thirteen Years' War. A legend developed associating an inspirational standardbearer not with Königsberg's painful civil war of 1455, but with the Knights' victory at Rudau in the previous century.
