= Walther Krause =

- Born: 31 December 1890; Schweidnitz
- Died: 25 October 1960 (aged 69); Göttingen
- Military career
- Allegiance: German Empire; Weimar Republic; Nazi Germany
- Branch: German Army
- Service years: 1909–1945
- Rank: Generalleutnant
- Commands: 14th Infantry Division; 170th Infantry Division
- Conflicts: World War I; World War II; Invasion of Poland; Battles of Rzhev; Siege of Leningrad
- Awards: Knight's Cross of the Iron Cross

Walther Krause (31 December 1890 – 25 October 1960) was a German general during World War II. He was a recipient of the Knight's Cross of the Iron Cross of Nazi Germany.

== Awards and decorations ==
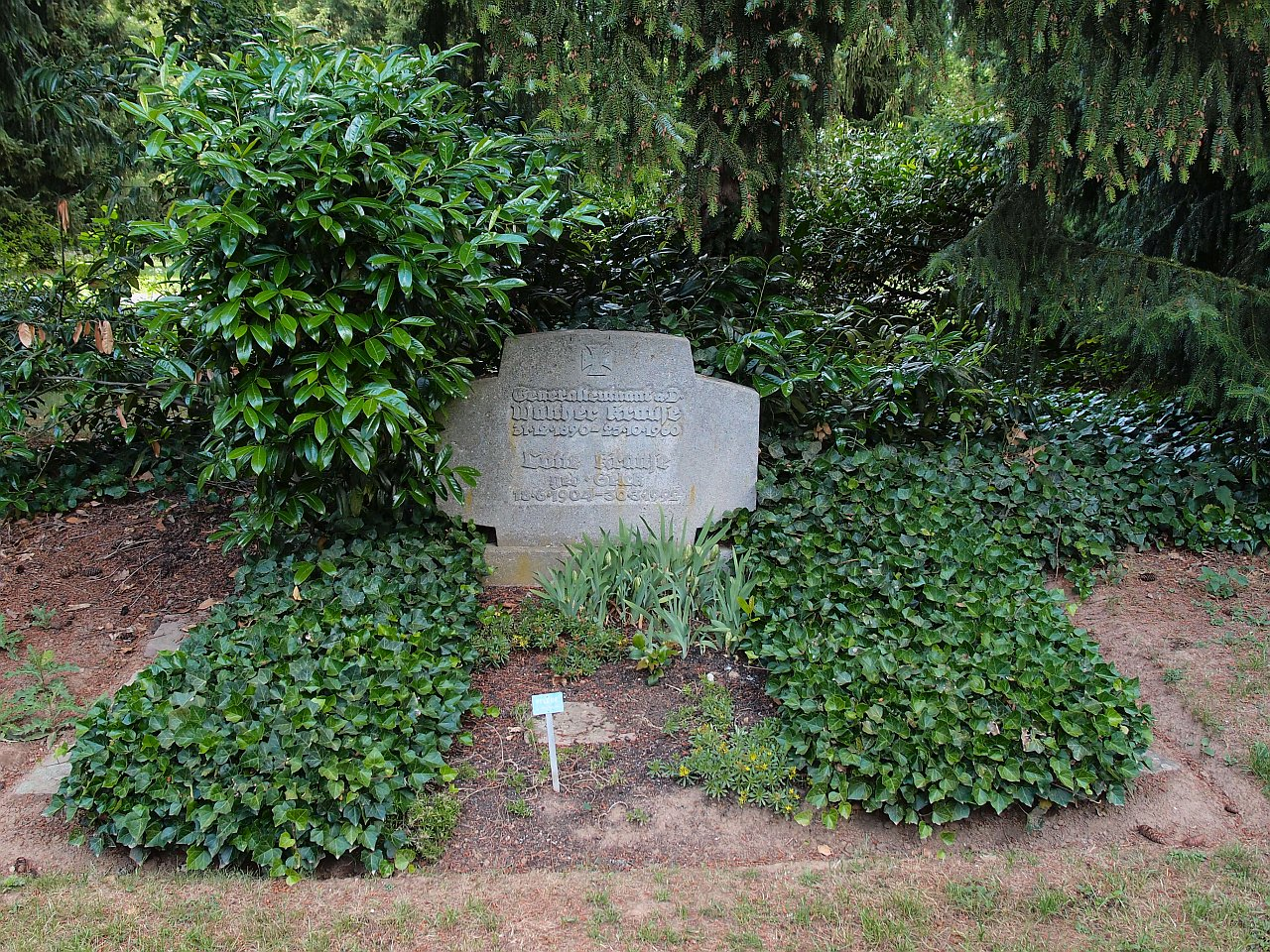
Grave in Göttingen

- Knight's Cross of the Iron Cross on 10 June 1943 as Generalmajor and commander of 170. Infanterie-Division

Military offices
Preceded by Generalleutnant Heinrich Wosch	Commander of 14. Infanterie-Division (mot.); 1 October 1942 – 1 January 1943	Succeeded by Generalleutnant Rudolf Holste
Preceded by Generalleutnant Erwin Sander	Commander of 170. Infanterie-Division; 15 February 1943 – 15 February 1944	Succeeded by Generalmajor Franz Griesbach
