= 562nd Grenadier Division =

Infantry division of Nazi Germany's Wehrmacht

- 562. Grenadier-Division
- Active: 1944–1945
- Country: Nazi Germany
- Branch: Wehrmacht

The 562nd Grenadier Division (German: 562. Grenadier-Division) was an infantry division of Nazi Germany's Wehrmacht.

== 2nd Grenadier Division East Prussia ==
The division was formed on 24 July 1944 at Stablack in Wehrkreis I (East Prussia) as the 2nd Grenadier Division East Prussia (German: Grenadier-Division Ostpreußen 2). The division had a mere four grenadier battalions. It had the following organisation:

- Grenadier Regiment East Prussia 3
- Grenadier Regiment East Prussia 4
- Artillery Regiment East Prussia 2
- Fusilier Company East Prussia 2
- Tank destroyer Battalion East Prussia 2
- Engineer Company East Prussia 2
- Signal Company East Prussia 2

== 562nd Grenadier Division ==
On 27 July, the division was renamed the 562nd Grenadier Division. All of its subordinate units were also renamed:

- 1144th Grenadier Regiment
- 1145th Grenadier Regiment
- 1562nd Artillery Regiment
- 562nd Fusilier Company
- 1562nd Tank Destroyer Battalion
- 1562nd Engineer Company
- 1562nd Signal Company

== 562nd Volksgrenadier Division ==
On October 9, the division was upgraded to a Volksgrenadier division. By then, the division was already part of the Army Group Centre's 4th Army's LV Corps. The division fought at Augustavas and Narew.

Finally, it fought on its home territory opposing the Red Army's East Prussian offensive. Most of the division was destroyed in the Heiligenbeil Pocket in March 1945. Only a small part of the division evacuated via the sea to the Hel peninsula together with the 4th Army. The division was disbanded on 16 April 1945 and its survivors were captured by the Soviets. The division's staff was later used as the staff of the 4th Reich Labour Service Division.

== Commanders ==
No.	Portrait	Commander	Took office	Left office	Time in office
1	Johannes Oskar Brauer	Generalmajor; Johannes Oskar Brauer (1895–1980)	9 October 1944	22 January 1945	105 days
2	Helmuth Hufenbach	Oberst; Helmuth Hufenbach (1908–1945)	22 January 1945	27 March 1945	64 days

== Bibliography ==
- Mitcham, Samuel W. (2007a). German Order of Battle: 1st-290th Infantry divisions in World War II. Stackpole Books. ISBN 9780811734165.
- Mitcham, Samuel W. (2007b). German Order of Battle: 291st-999th Infantry divisions, named infantry divisions, and special divisions in World War II. Stackpole Books. ISBN 9780811734370.
- Lexikon, der Wehrmacht (2012). "562. Volks-Grenadier-Division" (in German). Archived from the original on 2 March 2012.
