= Helmuth Hufenbach =

- Born: 27 February 1908; Oldenburg, Grand Duchy of Oldenburg, German Empire
- Died: 27 March 1945 (aged 37); Heiligenbeil, East Prussia (now Mamonovo, Kaliningrad Oblast, Russian Federation)
- Military career
- Allegiance: Weimar Republic; Nazi Germany
- Branch: Army
- Rank: Generalmajor (Posthumously)
- Commands: 562nd Grenadier Division
- Conflicts: World War II: Heiligenbeil Pocket †
- Awards: Knight's Cross of the Iron Cross with Oak Leaves

Helmuth Hufenbach (27 February 1908 – 27 March 1945) was a German officer in the Wehrmacht of Nazi Germany during World War II. Hufenbach was killed on 27 March 1945 in the Heiligenbeil Pocket. He was posthumously promoted to Generalmajor and awarded the Knight's Cross of the Iron Cross with Oak Leaves.

== Awards and decorations ==
- Iron Cross (1939) 2nd Class (21 September 1939) & 1st Class (24 October 1939)
- German Cross in Gold on 27 November 1941 as Hauptmann in the III./Infanterie-Regiment 45
- Knight's Cross of the Iron Cross with Oak Leaves
  - Knight's Cross on 30 October 1943 as Oberstleutnant and commander of Grenadier-Regiment 667
  - 807th Oak Leaves on 28 March 1945 as Oberst and commander of 562. Volks-Grenadier Division

Military offices
Preceded by Generalmajor Johannes-Oskar Brauer	Commander of 562. Volks-Grenadier Division; 22 January 1945 – 27 March 1945	Succeeded by None
