= Wilhelm Philipps =

German general

- Born: 29 July 1894; Barmen
- Died: 13 February 1971 (aged 76); Bonn
- Military career
- Allegiance: German Empire; Weimar Republic; Nazi Germany
- Branch: Army
- Service years: 1913–1945
- Rank: Generalleutnant
- Commands: 3rd Panzer Division
- Conflicts: World War I World War II
- Awards: Knight's Cross of the Iron Cross

Wilhelm Philipps (29 July 1894 – 13 February 1971) was a German general in the Wehrmacht during World War II. He was a recipient of the Knight's Cross of the Iron Cross of Nazi Germany.

== Awards ==
- Knight's Cross of the Iron Cross on 5 March 1945 as Generalleutnant and commander of 3. Panzer-Division

Military offices
Preceded by Oberst Rudolf Lang	Commander of 3. Panzer-Division; 24 May 1944 – 1 January 1945	Succeeded by Generalmajor Wilhelm Söth
