= 3rd Panzer Division (Wehrmacht) =

German armoured division during World War II

- 3. Panzer-Division; — 3. PzDiv — XX
- Unit Symbol
- Active: 15 October 1935 – 8 May 1945
- Country: Nazi Germany
- Branch: German Army
- Type: Panzer
- Role: Armoured warfare
- Size: Division
- Part of: Wehrmacht
- Garrison/HQ: Wehrkreis III: Berlin
- Engagements: World War II; Invasion of Poland; Battle of Belgium; Battle of France; Operation Barbarossa; Case Blue; Battle of Kursk

Insignia
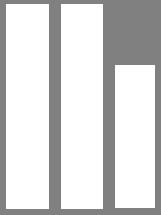
- During Operation Citadel

- Summer 1943

The 3rd Panzer Division (English: 3rd Tank Division) was an armoured division in the German Army, the Wehrmacht, during World War II.

The division was one of the original three tank divisions established by Germany in 1935. The division participated in the Invasions of Poland, Belgium, France and the Soviet Union. From 1941 to 1945 it continuously fought on the Eastern Front.

== History ==
=== Before World War II ===
The 3rd Panzer Division was formed on 15 October 1935 from elements of the 1st and 3rd Cavalry Division as well as a variety of other military and police units, and was headquartered in the German capital Berlin. It was one of three tank divisions created at the time, the other two being the 1st and 2nd Panzer Division. Germany had renounced the Treaty of Versailles earlier in the year which had forbidden the country, among other things, from having tank forces, a treaty Germany had violated almost from the start by secretly developing tanks and operating a covert tank school in the Soviet Union.

Members of the divisions tank regiment participated in the Spanish Civil War on the Nationalist side as part of the German Legion Condor. The division also took part in the annexation of Austria in March 1938, the so-called Anschluss.

=== Action During World War II ===
The 3rd Panzer Division participated in the 1939 invasion of Poland, where it was the most numerically powerful Panzer Division, with 391 tanks. It was engaged in the northern sector, operating from Pomerania, and advancing via Toruń to Brest-Litovsk. In May 1940 it was part of the German forces invading Belgium, advancing via the Albert Canal to Brussels and into France. Like the other German tank divisions the 3rd lost one of its two tank regiments in late 1940 to allow for the creation of further tank divisions, and gained an Infantry regiment instead.

The Division was ordered to prepare for service in Libya, North Africa that same year to help support the Italian efforts there. The deployment was cancelled by Hitler due to the invasion of Greece on 28 October 1940. The Division was instead diverted to Operation Felix though the operation was never initiated.

The 3rd Panzer Division was part of Operation Barbarossa, the invasion of the Soviet Union, which began on 22 June 1941. Initially it was engaged in the central sector of the advance but was then redirected south to participate in the Battle of Kiev. From there it participated in the Battle of Moscow, advancing towards Tula. With the Soviet counterattacks in the winter of 1941–42 the division acted as a stand-by emergency force and, in March 1942, participated in the defense of Kharkov. The division participated in the Case Blue, the German attack in the southern sector of the Eastern Front in June 1942, in which the 3rd Panzer Division advanced towards the Caucasus. Initially successful the operation was ultimately a failure, with the division suffering heavy casualties in the process, especially in the fighting around Mozdok. It narrowly escaped encirclement on its retreat by crossing the frozen Sea of Azov near Rostov.

The 3rd Panzer Division took part in the Battle of Kursk, attacking west of Belgorod. Following the German failure the division was engaged in the defense and retreat that followed. It remained on the Eastern Front for the remainder of the Second World War, fighting in Ukraine, Romania, Poland and Hungary. At the end of the war saw the division engaged in Styria where it evaded Soviet forces and managed to surrender to the US Army instead. The majority of the divisions soldiers were released from captivity by July 1945.

== Commanders ==
The commanders of the division:

- Generalmajor Ernst Fessmann (15. October 1935 – 30 September 1937)
- Generalleutnant Leo Geyr von Schweppenburg (1 October 1937 – 7 October 1939)
- Generalleutnant Horst Stumpff (7 October 1939 – September 1940)
- Generalleutnant Friedrich Kühn (September 1940 – 4 October 1940)
- Generalleutnant Horst Stumpff (4 October 1940 – 13 November 1940)
- Generalleutnant Walter Model (13 November 1940 – 1 October 1941)
- Generalleutnant Hermann Breith (1 October 1941 – 1 October 1942)
- Generalleutnant Franz Westhoven (1 October 1942 – 25 October 1943)
- Generalleutnant Fritz Bayerlein (25 October 1943 – 5 January 1944)
- Oberst Rudolf Lang (5 January 1944 – 25 May 1944)
- Generalleutnant Wilhelm Philipps (25 May 1944 – 1 January 1945)
- Generalmajor Wilhelm Söth (1 January 1945 – 19 April 1945)
- Oberst Volkmar Schöne (19 April 1945 – 8 May 1945)

== Organisation ==
The organisation of the division:

1939 – Poland	1943 – Eastern Front
Panzer-Brigade 3; Panzer-Regiment 5; Panzer-Regiment 6	Panzer-Regiment 6
Schützen-Brigade 3; Schützen-Regiment 3; Kradschützen-Bataillon 3	Panzer-Grenadier-Regiment 3; Panzer-Grenadier-Regiment 394
Artillerie-Regiment 75	Panzer-Artillerie-Regiment 75
	Heeres-Flak-Artillerie-Abteilung 314
Aufklärungs-Abteilung 3	Panzer-Aufklärungs-Abteilung 3
Panzerabwehr-Abteilung 39	Panzerjäger-Abteilung 543
Pionier-Bataillon 39	Panzer-Pionier-Bataillon 39
Nachrichten-Abteilung 39	Panzer-Nachrichten-Abteilung 39
Nachschubtruppen 83	Nachschubtruppen 83

== See also ==
- List of German divisions in World War II
- Organisation of a SS Panzer Division
- Panzer division
