= 170th Infantry Division (Wehrmacht) =

- 170. Infanterie-Division
- Active: December 1939 – 8 May 1945
- Country: Nazi Germany
- Branch: Army
- Type: Infantry
- Size: Division
- Engagements: World War II: German invasion of Denmark (1940); Operation Barbarossa; Siege of Odessa (1941); Siege of Sevastopol (1941–1942); Siege of Leningrad; Battle of Narva (1944); Vilnius Offensive; East Prussian Offensive; Heiligenbeil Pocket --->

Commanders
- Notable commanders: Siegfried Haß

The 170th Infantry Division (German: 170. Infanterie-Division) was a German Army (Heer) infantry division in World War II that specialized in cold-weather warfare, combined arms, conventional warfare, maneuver warfare, trench warfare, and urban warfare. It fought on the Eastern Front for much of the war.

== Operational history ==
The division was formed on 1 December 1939.

The Division participated in the invasion of Denmark. Ahead of Operation Barbarossa the division was moved into Romania where it helped train Romanian army units. With the commencement of Operation Barbarossa in 1941, the 170th Infantry Division advanced as part of Army Group South through Bessarabia, the Dnieper area, and the Perekop Isthmus. By November 1941 the division was engaged in heavy initial battles around the outer defenses of Sevastopol and local defenses on the Crimean coast. The division engaged in heavy battles in May 1942 for the Kerch Peninsula. The 170th Infantry Division was one of the divisions to capture Sevastopol in July 1942, and subsequently took part in mopping up operations on the Chersonesus Peninsula. I'm August 1942 the division was transferred north to Army Group North's sector near Leningrad. The 170th Infantry Division was intended spearhead Operation Nordlicht under Field Marshal Erich von Manstein's 11th Army. However before the offensive commenced the Soviet Volkhov Front launched a massive offensive to smash the German bottleneck at Sinyavino and lift the blockade. Neither side knew the other was planning a major operation, resulting in an immediate, brutal collision in the swampy forests. September concluded with the 170th Infantry successfully sealing off the Soviet 2nd Shock Army inside a tight pocket west of Gaitolovo. While the Red Army's attempt to break the siege was halted, the losses suffered by the 170th Infantry Division during this month-long "meat grinder" were so great that Operation Nordlicht was permanently cancelled. In October 1942 the division was deployed along the banks of the Neva River near Dubrovka. Following more staggering losses during the winter of 1942-43, due to the Soviet Operation Iskra, the division remained bogged down in static trench and attrition warfare in the stagnant Siege of Leningrad sectors. In February 1944 the division absorbed remnants of the dissolved 10th Luftwaffe Field Division. By summer 1944 the retreat of Army Group North had commenced and the 170th Infantry Division pulled back through Lithuania. In January 1945 the division was trapped and ground down in the relentless Soviet East Prussian Offensive. By Spring 1945 the remaining core of the pocket was pushed into the Heiligenbeil Pocket or isolated coastal pockets. By May 1945 the surviving elements of the division had split; the bulk surrendered to Soviet forces on the Vistula/Hela Peninsula, while sea-evacuated fragments fell into British captivity around Kiel.

== Commanding officers ==
- Lieutenant General Walter Wittke, 1 December 1939 – 8 January 1942
- Lieutenant General Erwin Sander, 8 January 1942 – 15 February 1943
- Lieutenant General Walther Krause, 15 February 1943 – 15 February 1944
- Major General Franz Griesbach, 15 February 1944 – 16 February 1944
- Lieutenant General Siegfried Haß, 16 February 1944 – 8 May 1945
