= Wilhelm Söth =

(1903 - 1978) German general

- Born: 15 February 1903; Wilster, German Empire
- Died: 6 July 1978 (aged 75); Hamburg, West Germany
- Military career
- Allegiance: Weimar Republic; Nazi Germany
- Branch: Army (Wehrmacht)
- Rank: Generalmajor
- Commands: Parachute-Panzer Division Hermann Göring; 3rd Panzer Division
- Conflicts: World War II
- Awards: Knight's Cross of the Iron Cross

Wilhelm Söth (15 February 1903 – 6 July 1978) was a German general during World War II who commanded the 3rd Panzer Division. He was a recipient of the Knight's Cross of the Iron Cross of Nazi Germany.

== Awards ==
- Knight's Cross of the Iron Cross on 28 November 1940 as Hauptmann and commander of the II./Artillerie-Regiment 56

Military offices
Preceded by Generalmajor Erich Walther	Commander of Fallschirm-Panzergrenadier Division 2 Hermann Göring; November 1944 - 1 January 1945	Succeeded by Oberst Georg Seegers
Preceded by Generalleutnant Wilhelm Philipps	Commander of 3. Panzer-Division; 1 January 1945 - 19 April 1945	Succeeded by Oberst Volkmar Schöne
