= Siegfried Grossmann =

German physicist (1930–2025)

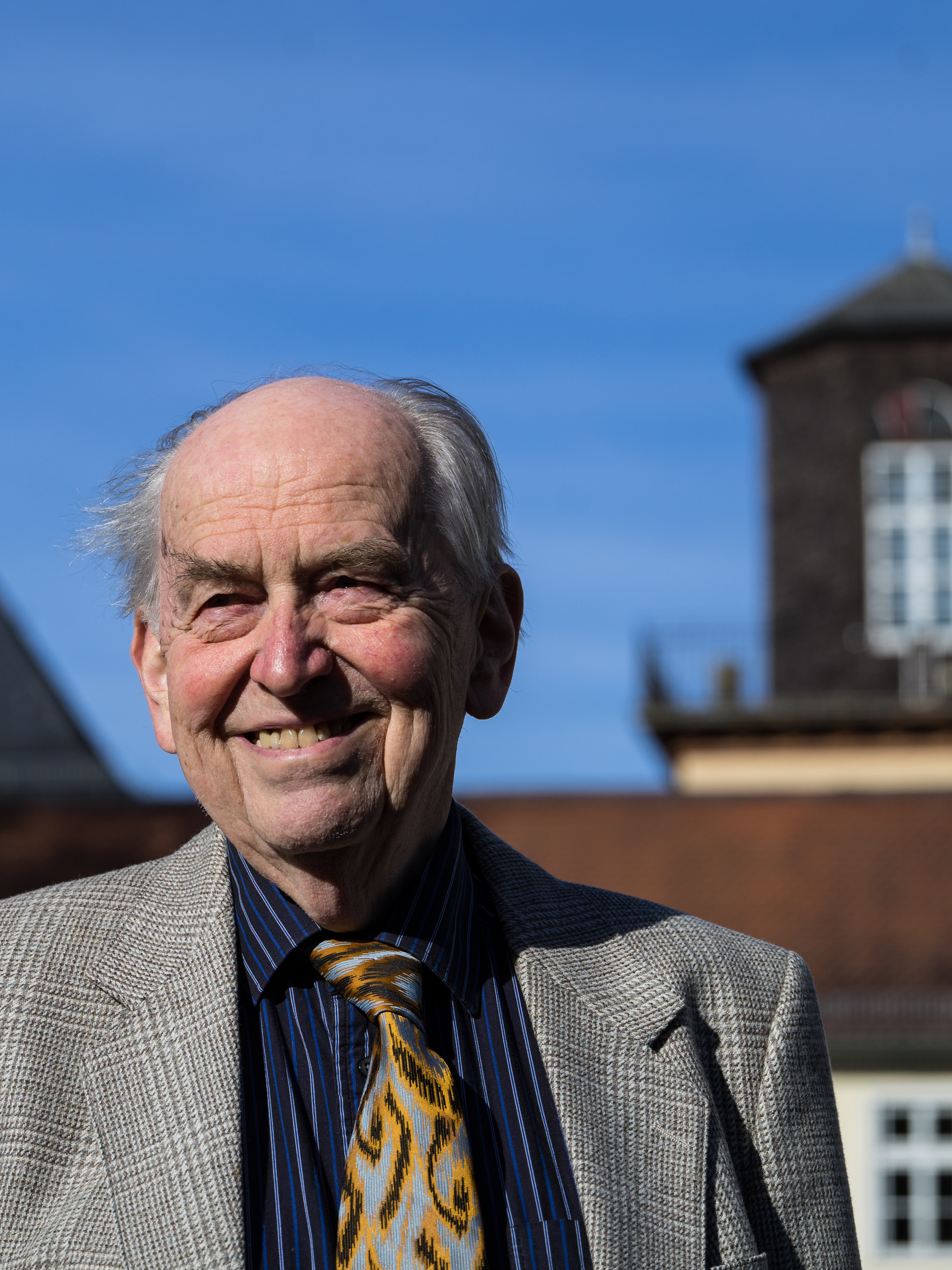
- Grossmann in 2017
- Born: 28 February 1930; Quednau (near Königsberg), East Prussia (now Kaliningrad, Russia)
- Died: 21 November 2025; Marburg, Germany
- Education: Free University of Berlin
- Known for: Work on turbulence, statistical physics, and nonlinear dynamics
- Awards: Max Planck Medal (1995)
- Scientific career
- Fields: Theoretical physics
- Workplaces: Free University of Berlin; University of Marburg

Siegfried Grossmann (28 February 1930 – 21 November 2025) was a German theoretical physicist who was awarded the Max Planck Medal, the major prize for achievements in theoretical physics.

== Biography ==
Grossmann was born in Quednau, East Prussia near Königsberg (now Kaliningrad, Russia) and educated at the Pedagogical High School in Berlin, where he graduated in teaching. Whilst training to be a teacher he studied physics, mathematics and chemistry at the Free University of Berlin.

In 1959 he became an assistant at the university to Günther Ludwig, a respected German theoretical physicist and was promoted to study the inelastic scattering of Hydrogen molecules. He qualified two years later with a work on Quantum Mechanics and from 1963 worked as a conservator at Munich Technical University. In 1964 he obtained an extraordinary professorship at the University of Marburg, to which his mentor Ludwig had already moved. In 1968 he was given a full professorship in theoretical physics, retiring in 1998.

He was married with three children.

Grossmann died on 21 November 2025.

== Research ==
Grossmann is considered one of the founders of nonlinear dynamics and chaos theory. His work on turbulence contributed to an understanding of the transition from laminar to turbulent flow. He provided contributions to the description of a laser using nonlinear dynamics. With Stefan Thomae he produced a value for the Feigenbaum constant.

He was also one of the leading theoreticians in the fields of fluid dynamics and theory of turbulence, stochastic processes, phase transitions, laser physics, nuclear physics, transport theory, Bose-Einstein condensation and the general statistical physics, as well as mathematical physics and functional analysis.

== Honours and awards ==
In 1991 Grossmann was elected a member of the European Academy of Sciences and Arts. In 1995 he was awarded the prestigious Max Planck Medal for outstanding achievements in the field of theoretical physics. In 2006 he received a doctorate from the University of Duisburg-Essen for his work on the theory of turbulence and non-linear dynamics.

At the age of 90 he was still scientifically active, publishing research papers every year and giving lectures at conferences and seminars.

== Publications ==
Grossmann wrote over 200 publications in various fields of physics.

He also wrote two textbooks on the mathematical foundations of classical theoretical physics and quantum mechanics:

- Mathematical introductory course for physics. Teubner, Stuttgart. ISBN 3-519-13074-2.
- Functional analysis with regard to applications in physics: Study book for students of physics and mathematics at universities and technical colleges. Aula Publishing House, Wiesbaden. ISBN 3-89104-479-8.
