= Quednau Church =

Former church in Königsberg, Germany

Coordinates: 54°45′29″N 20°32′37″E

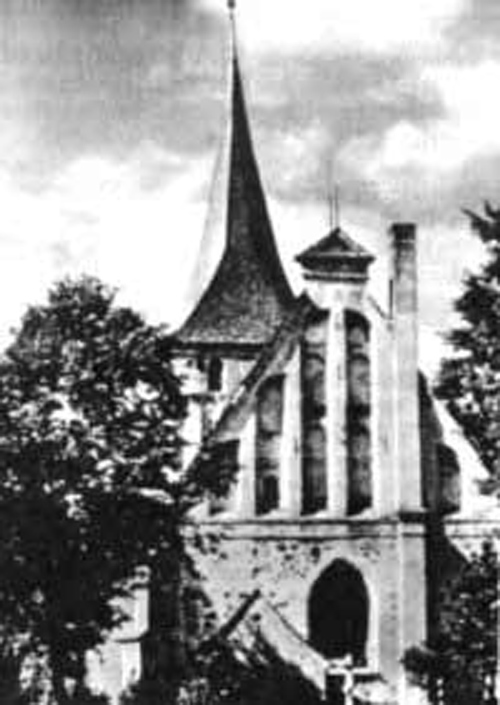
Quednau Church

Quednau Church (German: Quednauer Kirche) was a Protestant church in northern Königsberg, Germany.

== History ==
The first church in Quednau was a Roman Catholic pilgrimage church for fishermen and sailors built in 1268. Measuring 25 m long and 12.5 m wide, it was built atop the hill Quednauer Berg and dedicated to Saint James the Greater. In 1320 a pastor Hermann was mentioned.

Dismantled in 1507, the church was rebuilt at the foot of the hill by 1509 with the support of Grand Master Frederick of Saxony. This second church was built in the Gothic style with plastered fieldstones. The church was converted to Lutheranism in 1525 with the creation of the Duchy of Prussia. It was subsequently rebuilt after a storm in 1687. During the occupation of Königsberg at the end of the War of the Fourth Coalition, Quednau Church was used as a stable by French troops.

The church's roof was damaged by windthrow in 1818; it was eventually closed from 1828 to 1830 for repairs. The steeple was restored in 1853 after a lightning strike, and from 1870 to 1880 the entire church was renovated.

The church was noted for its numerous gravestones and epitaphs from the 17th and 18th centuries. The interior also featured a stellar vault. The pulpit was designed by Johann Christoph Döbel in 1687. Near the pulpit was the alleged armor of Henning Schindekopf. It contained two bells; one cast in 1710 hangs in the St. Martini Church in Stockheim/Hann.

Quednau Church was destroyed in 1945 during the Battle of Königsberg. Its ruins in Kaliningrad were demolished in 1970.
