= Erwin Sander =

German general (1892–1962)

- Born: 5 March 1892
- Died: 7 December 1962 (aged 70)
- Military career
- Allegiance: German Empire; Weimar Republic; Nazi Germany
- Branch: German Army
- Service years: 1910–1920; 1935–1945
- Rank: Generalleutnant
- Commands: 170th Infantry Division; 245th Infantry Division
- Conflicts: World War I; World War II; Invasion of Poland; Battle of France; Operation Barbarossa; Siege of Sevastopol; Siege of Leningrad; Siegfried Line Campaign; Operation Market Garden
- Awards: Knight's Cross of the Iron Cross

Erwin Sander (5 March 1892 – 7 December 1962) was a general in the Wehrmacht of Nazi Germany during World War II who commanded several divisions. He was a recipient of the Knight's Cross of the Iron Cross.

== Awards ==
- Knight's Cross of the Iron Cross on 3 September 1942 as Generalmajor and commander of 170. Infanterie-Division

Military offices
Preceded by Generalleutnant Walter Wittke	Commander of 170. Infanterie-Division; 8 January 1942 – 15 February 1943	Succeeded by Generalleutnant Walther Krause
Preceded by None	Commander of 245. Infanterie-Division; 8 April 1943 – 1 April 1945	Succeeded by Generalmajor Kuno Dewitz
