= Severnaya Gora =

Coordinates: 54.7611°N 20.5458°E

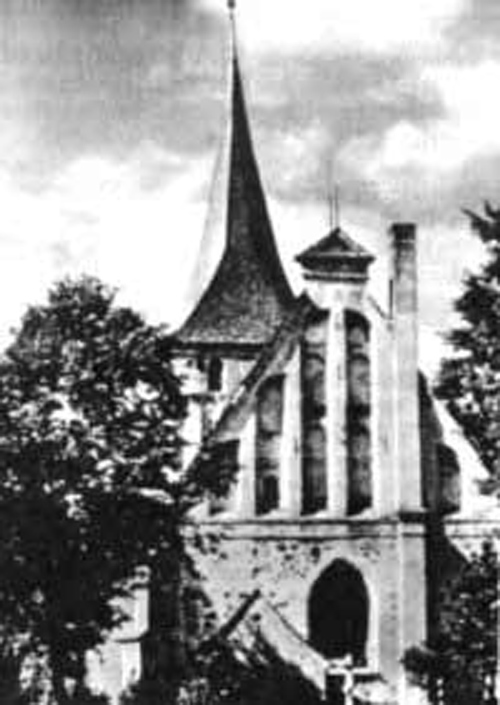
Quednau Church

Severnaya Gora (Russian: Северная Гора; "North Mountain") is part of the Leningradsky District in northern Kaliningrad, Russia. It was formerly known by its German name Quednau as first a suburb of and then a quarter of Königsberg, Germany.

== History ==
Quednau was first documented in 1255 as a region populated by Old Prussians at the foot of a 54 m high hill, the Quednauer Berg. The hill was also known as the Pikollosberg, after the Old Prussian god Pikollos, and the Apolloberg, regarding Apollo being a malapropism of Pikollos. Nalube, a native of Quednau, led a group of Sambians during the Siege of Königsberg and burned down the initial settlement.

In 1258, Quednau was documented as Quedenow, and in 1302 as Quidenowe and Quedemnowe. A castle of the Bishop of Samland existed in Quednau from 1302 to 1427. Quednau eventually passed to the town of Löbenicht. The vicinity suffered from revolt after the creation of the Duchy of Prussia in 1525; the Prussian nobility negotiated with the peasants at Quednau on 8 September 1525. During the 18th century, Quednau was part of Amt Kalthof.

Much of the village was dismantled by French troops to create barracks in June 1807 during the War of the Fourth Coalition. Politically active students from the University of Königsberg held a commercium in Quednau in 1839. On 18 October 1863, a celebration was held in Quednau by Königsberg's men's gymnastics club to commemorate the fiftieth anniversary of the Battle of Leipzig. The community's church was the Gothic Quednau Church. The Fort III König Friedrich Wilhelm, named in 1894, was built near Quednauer Berg as part of the new Königsberg fortifications constructed from 1872 to 1894.

The estate of Quednau was for long in the possession of the Olfers family. Quednau developed into a garden town in the first half of the 20th century. Southernmost Quednau was incorporated into the city of Königsberg in 1927, with the remainder following in 1939. Maraunenhof was to the southwest and Kummerau to the southeast. In 1888, the fort III König Friedrich Wilhelm I. was built on Quednauer Berg as part of the Königsberg fortifications; the 367 Infanterie Division was based out of it until 7 April 1945. Physicist Siegfried Grossmann (1930-2025) is a native of Quednau.

Königsberg was transferred to Soviet control in 1945 after World War II. Königsberg was subsequently renamed to Kaliningrad and Quednau to Severnaya Gora.
