= Battle of Rudau =

1370 battle of the Northern Crusades

- Part of the Northern Crusades
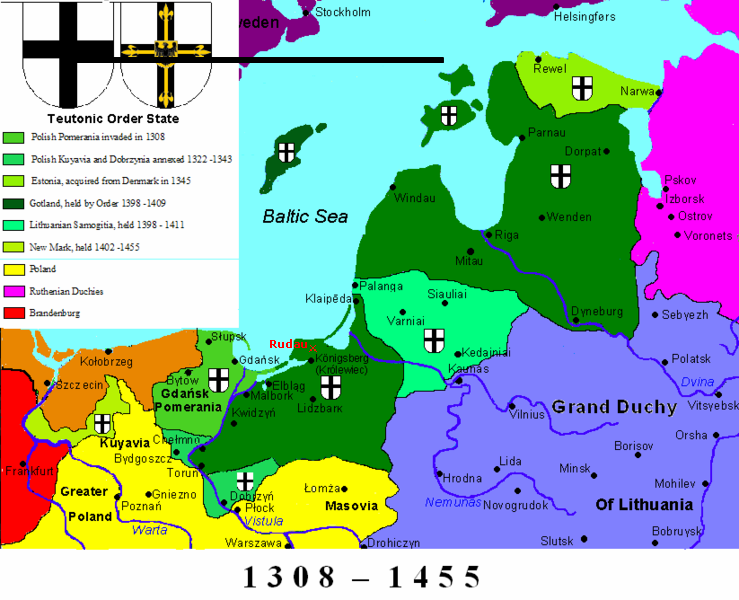
- Historical map of the Teutonic State (1308–1455) showing the location of the Battle of Rudau (1370).
Date	17 or 18 February 1370
Location	Rudau north of Königsberg 54°52′19″N 20°27′37″E
Result	Teutonic victory

Belligerents
Teutonic Knights (State of the Teutonic Order)	Grand Duchy of Lithuania

Commanders and leaders
Winrich von Kniprode (State of the Teutonic Order) Henning Schindekop (State of the Teutonic Order) †	Algirdas (Grand Duchy of Lithuania) Kęstutis (Grand Duchy of Lithuania)

Strength
10,000 soldiers	17,000 soldiers

Casualties and losses
3,000 dead	9,000 dead

The Battle of Rudau (German: Schlacht bei Rudau, Lithuanian: Rūdavos mūšis) was a medieval pitched battle fought between the Teutonic Knights and the Grand Duchy of Lithuania on 17 or 18 February 1370 near Rudau village, north of Königsberg (now Melnikovo village in the Kaliningrad oblast). According to the Teutonic chronicler Wigand of Marburg and the Livonian chronicle of Hermann de Wartberge, the Lithuanians suffered a great defeat.

== Background ==
The Teutonic Knights had waged a crusade against the pagan Lithuanians since the 1290s in order to Christianize the country. Each side would organize military expeditions against each other and then retaliate. In August 1369 the Knights burned a Lithuanian fort in the mouth of the Nevėžis River; 109 people perished in the fire. During truce negotiations Kęstutis, brother and right-hand man of the Grand Duke Algirdas, warned the Prussian Marshal Henning Schindekop that he would organize a retaliation. This gave time for the Knights to prepare for an attack and they organized their army in Königsberg.

== Battle ==
Kęstutis and Algirdas led their army, composed of Lithuanians, Samogitians, Ruthenians, and Tatars, to Prussia earlier than anticipated by the Knights. The Lithuanians took and burned Rudau Castle. Grand Master Winrich von Kniprode decided to take his army from Königsberg to meet the Lithuanians near Rudau. Contemporary Teutonic sources do not give details about the course of the battle, which is somewhat unusual. Details and battle plans were later provided by Jan Długosz (1415–1480), but his sources are unknown.

The Lithuanians suffered a defeat. Algirdas took his men to a forest and hastily erected wooden barriers while Kęstutis withdrew into Lithuania. Marshal Schindekopf pursued the retreating Lithuanians, but was injured by a spear and died before he reached Königsberg. The Lithuanian noble Vaišvilas is presumed to have died in the battle.

== Losses and aftermath ==
Teutonic sources exaggerate the Lithuanian losses, claiming that 1,000 to 5,500 men perished due to wounds, freezing weather, and starvation. That such numbers were exaggerated is shown by several robust Lithuanian military campaigns in the same year: a raid to Ortelsburg (Szczytno), large advances in the Galicia–Volhynia Wars, and the second raid to Moscow. The Teutonic Knights also suffered heavy losses: they lost several of their officers, including the marshal and two komturs. That the victory was not so one-sided as claimed by official Teutonic sources is also supported by a local legend that at a critical moment, when the Knights were about to give in to Lithuanian pressure, apprentice shoemaker Hans von Sagan replaced the fallen standard-bearer of Marshal Schindekop and led the Knights to victory.

The victory was attributed to the Virgin Mary and in her honor Kniprode established the Augustinian convent at Heiligenbeil (Mamonovo). The battle marked the last serious threat from the Lithuanians in Prussia in the 14th century.
