= Vaišvilas =

Lithuanian noble

Vaišvilas (Polish: Wojszwił) (14th century) was a Lithuanian noble and sometimes is considered one of the sons of Kęstutis, Grand Duke of Lithuania. In 1358 Kęstutis and Masovian princes formed a commission to settle border disputes. The Lithuanian side was represented by Vaišvilas (Woyszwylt), Patirgas, possibly another son of Kęstutis, and Eikšis, son of Karijotas. This leads historians to believe that Vaišvilas ruled some area bordering Masovia. In 1367 a treaty with Livonia mention Vaišvilas as Waysewist. Later he is found in Lahojsk, now Belarus. There are theories that an unnamed "nobilis satrapa" who died at the Battle of Rūdava in 1370 was Vaišvilas. He probably died before 1385 or 1387 because he is not mentioned during the turbulent civil wars between Vytautas the Great and Jogaila.

According to modern Polish historiography he was not a son of Kęstutis.
