= Erich Walther =

German military officer during World War II (1903–1948)

- Born: 5 August 1903; German Empire
- Died: 26 December 1948 (aged 45); Soviet Special Camp 2, Weimar, Allied-occupied Germany
- Military career
- Allegiance: Weimar Republic; Nazi Germany
- Branch: Luftwaffe
- Rank: Generalmajor
- Commands: 2nd Parachute Panzer Division Hermann Göring
- Conflicts: World War II
- Awards: Knight's Cross of the Iron Cross with Oak Leaves and Swords

Friedrich Erich Walther (5 August 1903 – 26 December 1948) was a German paratroop general during World War II. He was a recipient of the Knight's Cross of the Iron Cross with Oak Leaves and Swords of Nazi Germany. Walther commanded the Hermann Göring 2nd Parachute Panzer-Grenadier Division in East Prussia. He was promoted to Generalmajor on 30 January 1945. Walther surrendered to the Red Army on 8 May 1945. He died at NKVD Special Camp 2 on 26 December 1948.

== World War II ==
During World War II Walther fought over much of Europe as a paratroop officer.

In April 1940 he participated in the Norwegian Campaign as a captain. In May 1940 Walther participated in the airborne attack in the Netherlands and was promoted to the rank of major. In May 1941 he participated in an airborne attack on the island of Crete. Since September 1941 Walther fought on the eastern front, fighting near Leningrad. In January 1942 he was promoted to a lieutenant colonel. In July 1943 Walther fought on the island of Sicily, later in mainland Italy. In September 1944 Walther became battle group (Kampfgruppe) commander, fighting in the south of the Netherlands during operation Market Garden and its aftermath. Mid-October 1944 he became Commander in the Eastern Front, fighting in East Prussia. From January 1945 until he became a Soviet Prisoner of war on May 8 the same year, Walther was ranked Generalmajor.

== Awards ==
- Iron Cross (1939) 2nd Class (18 April 1940) & 1st Class (26 April 1940)
- German Cross in Gold on 31 March 1942 as Major in the I./Fallschirmjäger-Regiment 1
- Knight's Cross of the Iron Cross with Oak Leaves and Swords
  - Knight's Cross on 24 May 1940 as Major and commander of the I./Fallschirmjäger-Regiment 1
  - 411th Oak Leaves on 2 March 1944 as Oberst and commander of Fallschirmjäger-Regiment 4
  - 131st Swords on 1 February 1945 as Oberst and leader of Fallschirm-Panzergrenadier-Division 2 "Hermann Göring"

Military offices
Preceded by none	Commander of Fallschirmjäger-Regiment 4; 17 September 1942 – 15 March 1944	Succeeded by Major Franz Graßmel
Preceded by none	Commander of Kampfgruppe Walther; 13 September 1944 – 12 October 1944	Succeeded by Oberst Rudolf Goltzsch
Preceded by none	Commander of Fallschirm-Panzergrenadier-Division 2 "Hermann Göring"; October 1944 – 8 May 1945	Succeeded by none
