= Heiligenbeil Pocket =

1945 encirclement battle on the Eastern Front of WW2

- Part of the East Prussian Offensive in the Eastern Front of World War II
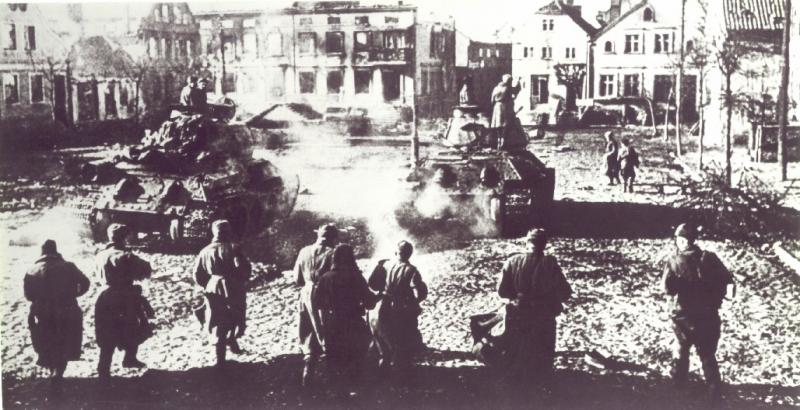
- Soviet troops enter Frauenburg, 9 February (?) 1945
Date	26 January – 29 March 1945
Location	East Prussia
Result	Soviet victory

Belligerents
Germany	USSR

Commanders and leaders
(Nazi Germany) Friedrich Hossbach (4th Army until January 29) (Nazi Germany) Friedrich Müller (4th Army from January 29)	(Soviet Union) Konstantin Rokossovsky (2nd Belorussian Front) (Soviet Union) Ivan Chernyakhovsky (3rd Belorussian Front until February 18 – KIA that day) (Soviet Union) Aleksandr Vasilevsky (3rd Belorussian Front from February 19)

Strength
150,000?	?

Casualties and losses
80,000 killed 50,000 captured 605 tanks 128 planes (According to Soviet information)	Unknown

The Heiligenbeil Pocket or Heiligenbeil Cauldron (German: Kessel von Heiligenbeil) was the site of a major encirclement battle on the Eastern Front during the closing weeks of World War II, in which the Wehrmacht's 4th Army was almost entirely destroyed during the Soviet Braunsberg Offensive Operation (13–22 March 1945). The pocket was located near Heiligenbeil in East Prussia in eastern Germany (now Mamonovo, Kaliningrad Oblast), and the battle, part of a broader Soviet offensive into the region of East Prussia, lasted from 26 January until 29 March 1945.

== East Prussian offensive ==
The Red Army's East Prussian Operation commenced on 13 January 1945, with the objective of rolling up the substantial German defences in East Prussia and cutting off the provincial capital of Königsberg. The Soviet forces were opposed by the German Army Group Centre, including the Fourth Army, under the command of General Friedrich Hossbach. While the 3rd Belorussian Front initially met strong resistance, the outnumbered German forces soon began to suffer serious ammunition shortages. Colonel-General Georg-Hans Reinhardt, commander of Army Group Centre, warned of the seriousness of the situation as early as 19 January, but was not permitted to make a phased withdrawal.

== The pocket forms ==
To save his units from encirclement, Hossbach started to pull the Fourth Army back to the west in direct contravention of orders, abandoning the prepared defences around Lötzen on 23 January. By this time, Rokossovsky's 2nd Belorussian Front had already broken through on Hossbach's right; the Soviet 5th Guards Tank Army headed for the Baltic coast, cutting off most of East Prussia. Through a series of forced marches in atrocious winter weather, and accompanied by thousands of civilians, the Fourth Army moved towards Elbing, still held by the German Second Army, but found its path blocked by Soviet forces of the 48th Army to the east of the town.

An attack beginning on the night of 26 January initially resulted in lead elements of the 28th Jäger Division, breaking through to Elbing, where they linked up with the 7th Panzer Division; however German forces were driven back during the next four days after the 48th Army had regrouped. Hossbach's units now found themselves pushed into a Kessel (pocket) with their backs to the Frisches Haff.

Hossbach was relieved of command on 29 January, and was replaced by General Friedrich-Wilhelm Müller. His three corps were given an order to cease their breakout attempt on 30 January. Along with some units of Second Army, they found themselves encircled in the area of Heiligenbeil and Braunsberg; many of the civilians trapped with them attempted to escape across the frozen Haff to the Frische Nehrung and thence to Pillau or Danzig, reinforced paths marked by lamps having been constructed across the ice by Fourth Army's engineers.

== Civilian breakout ==
As the Nazis had effectively forbidden evacuation of East Prussia's civil population, when the Red Army attacked on 12 January 1945, civilians began a mass flight west to the Baltic sea coast. Many people were killed by Soviet troops, and by severe frost. At the coast, particularly in the harbour of Pillau, the Kriegsmarine managed to evacuate tens of thousands of civilians over the Baltic sea, and encouraged fierce resistance on land, since every delay to the Red Army meant the rescue of additional old people, women and children.

Attempts by the Red Army to break through the German perimeter early in February were fought back, with the Fourth Army receiving heavy artillery support from the German cruisers Admiral Scheer and Lützow firing across the Haff from the Baltic sea into the Frauenburg end of the pocket. Frauenburg itself was taken on February 9, in fierce fighting involving elements of the 170th Infantry Division. During one Soviet attack the 3rd Belorussian Front's commander, General Ivan Chernyakhovsky, was killed by a shell splinter near Mehlsack. His successor, Marshal Aleksandr Vasilevsky, having effectively contained the remains of the Army Group, concentrated on assembling reinforcements over the next month. Under the supervision of Major-General Karl Henke, the Germans continued to attempt resupply and evacuations of wounded along the Frische Nehrung, often at night to avoid air attack. A long, narrow corridor through to the besieged garrison of Königsberg was also maintained against the attacks of the 11th Guards Army through a joint effort by the garrison, and by the Großdeutschland Panzergrenadier Division.

Though the German forces in East Prussia had no realistic hope of victory, and were severely short of manpower, ammunition, and fuel, they continued to offer strong resistance, inflicting extremely high casualties (584,788+) on the Red Army during the East Prussian Operation. Ad hoc battle groups were often bolstered by civilians press-ganged into the Volkssturm, and many East Prussian villages and towns had been turned into fortified strongpoints, in addition to the substantial fortifications centred on Heilsberg. The fighting was prolonged in order to keep open civilian escape routes, and because requests to evacuate the main body of the Fourth Army were refused by the German High Command.

The Soviet attack, however, came tragically late for the remaining inmates of the Heiligenbeil concentration camp, along with other camps in the area. Even as Hossbach's forces were attempting to break out of East Prussia, the prisoners were driven to the coast at Palmnicken and ordered to commit suicide by marching into the Baltic Sea.

== Destruction of the 4th Army ==
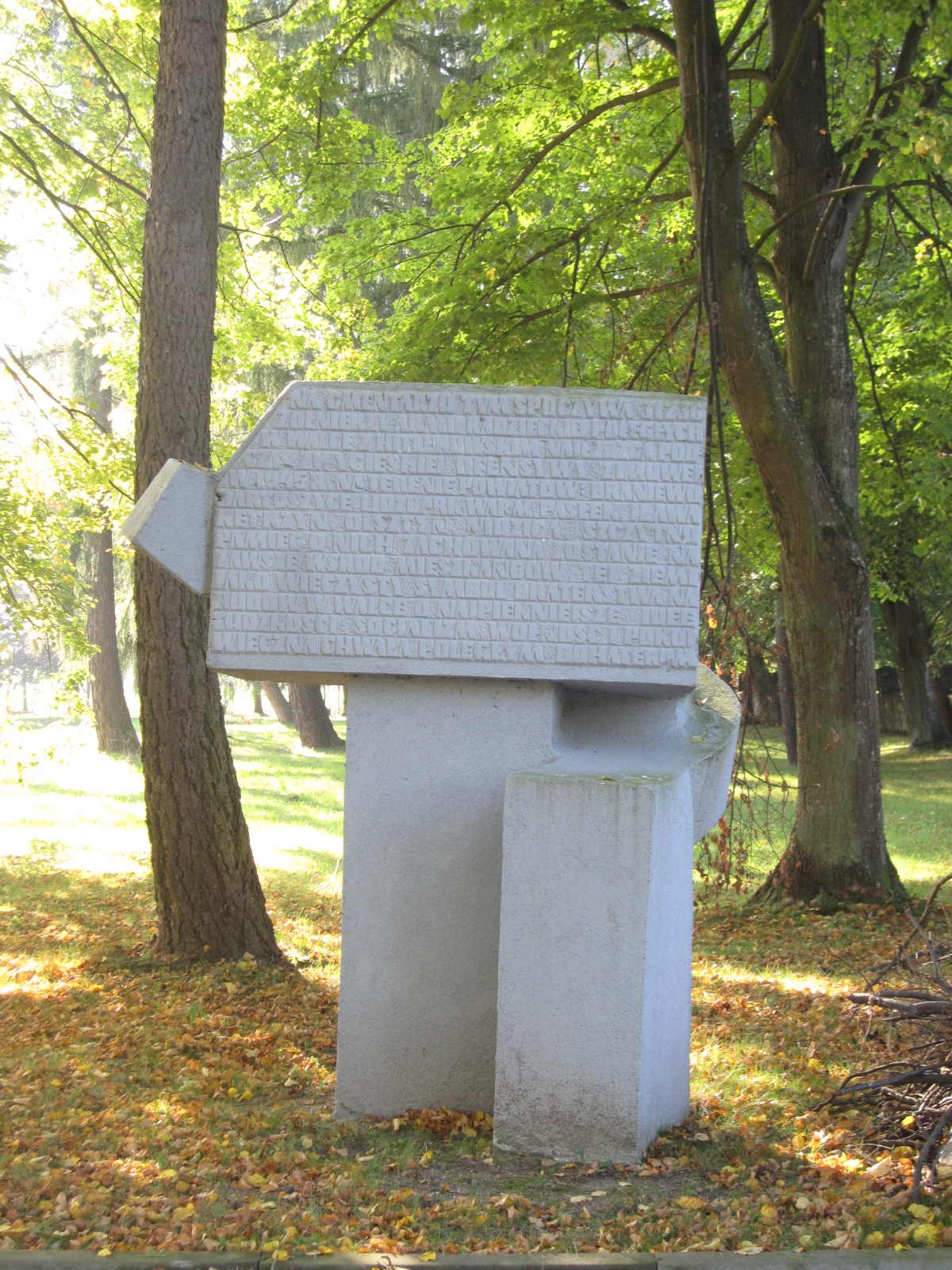
Monument in Braniewo (Braunsberg) honoring fallen Red Army soldiers

The pocket was finally crushed in an operation lasting from 13 March – 29 March, officially known as the Braunsberg Offensive Operation, in preparation for the final assault on Königsberg,

The Red Army quickly moved to cut communication between the Kessel and Königsberg, their troops reaching the coastline about 5 miles from the city on 15 March. A crossing of the Frisching River was forced in a night attack on the night of 17–18 March, further rolling up German defences of the Kessel from the east. Clearer weather from 18 March allowed an intensive aerial bombardment of the Fourth Army's positions.

With most communications cut, German forces remaining in the pocket were now faced with either death or being taken prisoner. Some 'elite' units, such as the Fallschirm-Panzergrenadier Division 2 Hermann Göring and the 24th Panzer Division, were evacuated by sea, but others were gradually cut off in a series of small pockets on the coast, in some cases actually digging into the coastal embankments or beaches. POW reports suggested that many German units were now seriously understrength, with the 50th Infantry Division, for example, able to field only a single incomplete regiment.

The Soviets finally took Braunsberg on 20 March. Heiligenbeil, covering the small port of Rosenberg, was attacked with phosphorus bombs on 22 March and successfully stormed on 25 March, the town suffering almost complete destruction. Rosenberg itself was taken on 26 March, with the remnants of the Fourth Army falling back on the Kahlholzer Haken peninsula, where the perimeter was defended by troops from the Panzerkorps "Großdeutschland" and the 28th Jäger Division. The last evacuations took place on the morning of 29 March from Kahlholz and Balga, where a remnant of the 562nd Volksgrenadier Division was destroyed forming a rearguard (its commander, Helmuth Hufenbach, receiving a posthumous promotion to Major-General). Soviet sources claimed 93,000 enemy dead and 46,448 taken prisoner during the operation; German sources claim that many troops in the Kessel were successfully evacuated to the Frische Nehrung. Given the chaos prevailing at this stage of the war, it is unlikely that accurate figures will ever be determined, many soldiers having simply disappeared. Further elements of the Fourth Army continued to resist around Pillau, and latterly on the Frische Nehrung, until May.

The 4th Army's archives were buried in a forest near the town of Heiligenbeil (now known as Mamonovo, Russia), in an area still littered with debris from the final battles.

== Units ==
=== Red Army ===
The following Soviet units were involved in completing the encirclement of the Kessel:

- 2nd Belorussian Front (Marshal Konstantin Rokossovsky)
  - 5th Guards Tank Army
  - 48th Army
  - 3rd Army
  - 50th Army
- 3rd Belorussian Front (General Aleksandr Vasilevsky)
  - 31st Army
  - 28th Army
  - 1st Air Army

=== Wehrmacht ===
German records list the following units with the Fourth Army at the time of the Kessel's collapse:

- VI Corps (General Horst Großmann)
  - 102nd Infantry Division
  - 24th Panzer Division
  - 349th Volksgrenadier Division
- XX Corps (General Rudolf Freiherr von Roman)
  - 131st Infantry Division
  - 61st Volksgrenadier Division
  - 21st Infantry Division
  - 14th Infantry Division
  - 292nd Infantry Division
  - 56th Infantry Division
- XXXXI Panzer Corps (General Helmuth Weidling)
  - 170th Infantry Division
  - Fallschirm-Panzergrenadier Division 2 Hermann Göring
  - Panzergrenadier Division "Großdeutschland"
  - 28th Jäger Division
  - 562nd Volksgrenadier Division
- 50th Infantry Division

Nearly all German units would have been at well below divisional strength even at the start of the East Prussian Operation; also some additional units involved (such as the 299th Infantry Division and 18th Panzergrenadier Division) were destroyed, disbanded or completely evacuated before the Kessel collapsed.
