= Crusade Against Communism Medal =

Romanian military award

Medal Crusade against Communism Medalia Cruciada împotriva comunismului
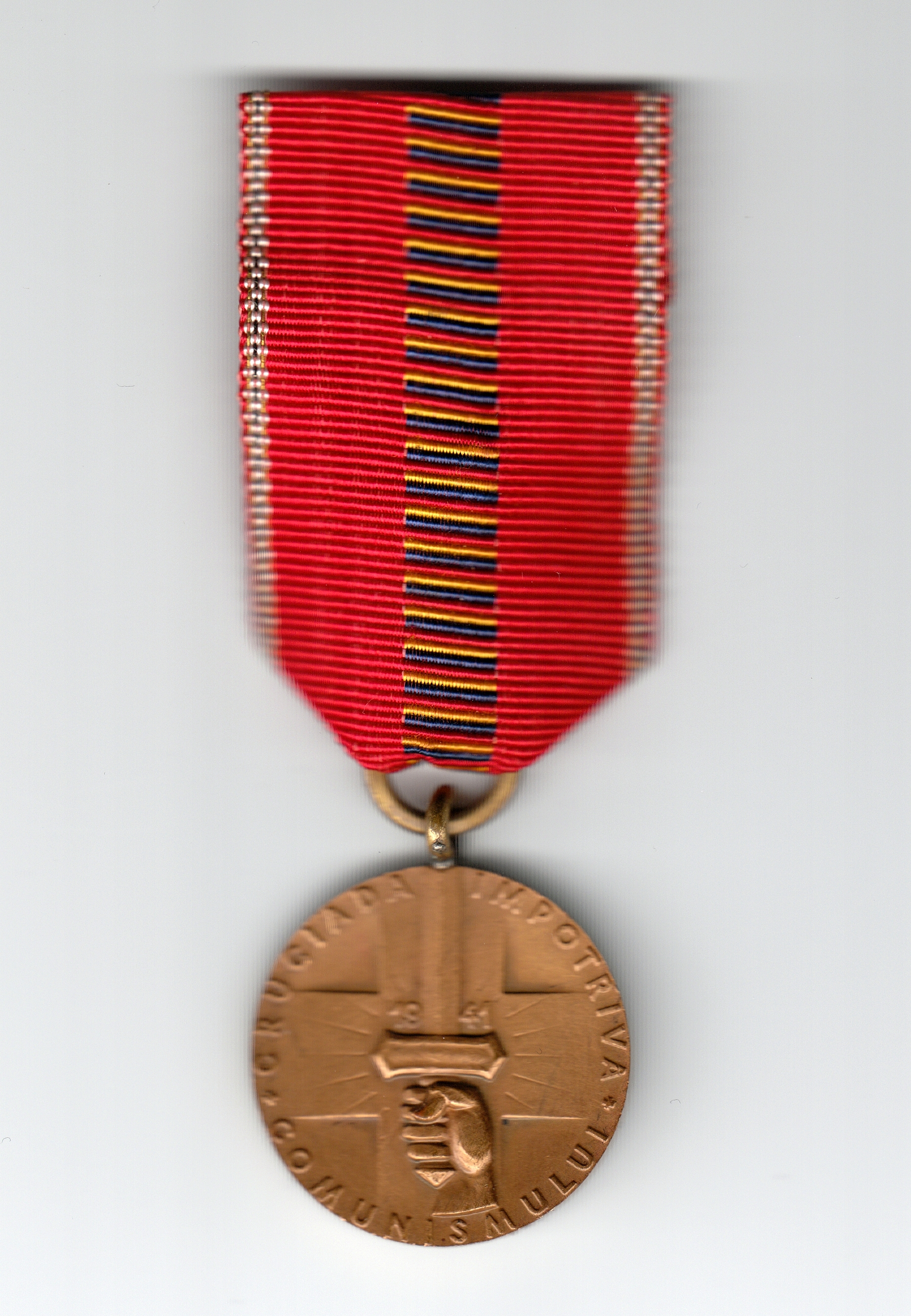
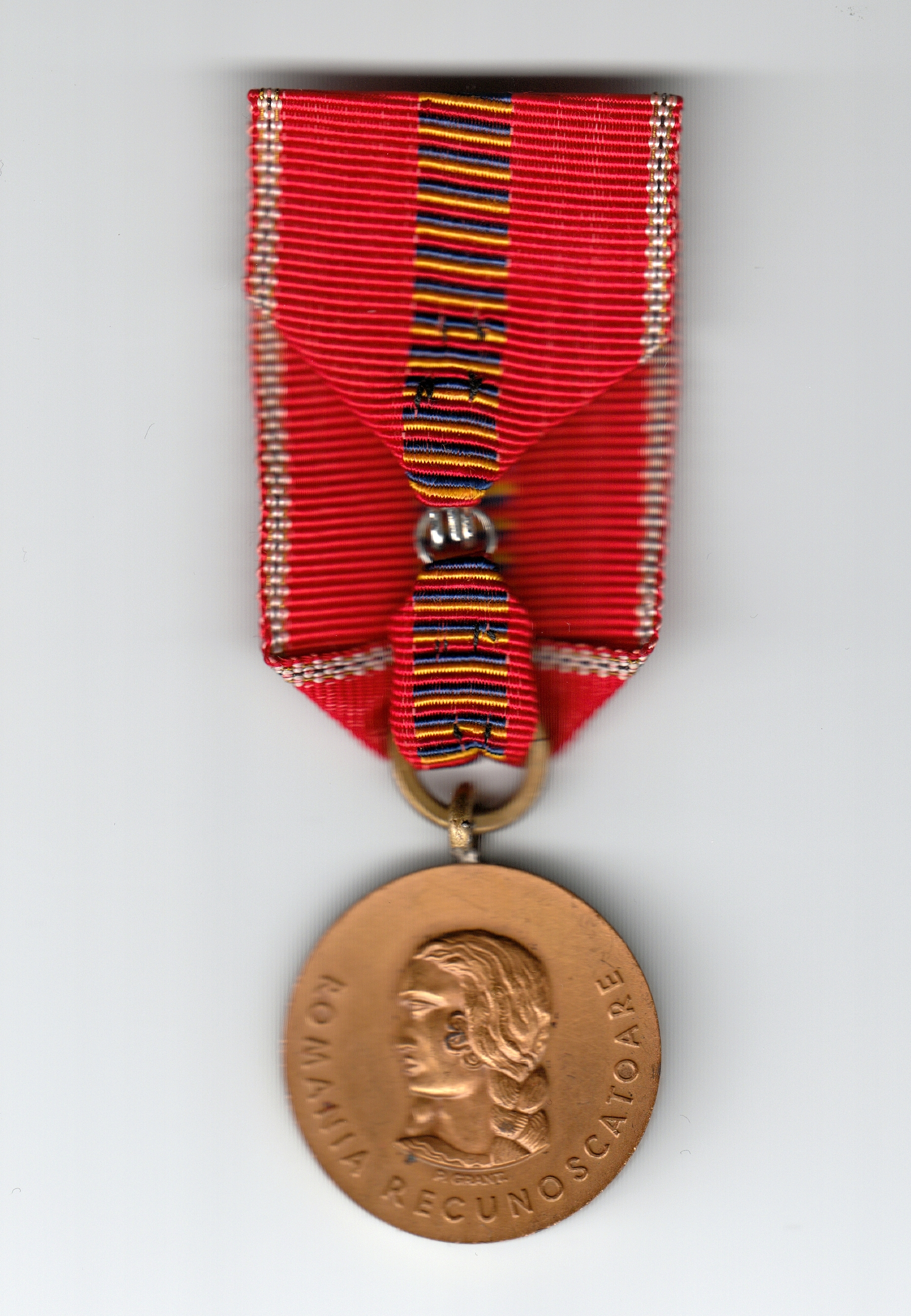
- Country: Kingdom of Romania
- Eligibility: Military and civilian personnel of Romania and its allies
- Campaign: World War II
- Clasps: Azov; Basarabia; Bucovina; Southern Bug; Calmucia; Caucaz; Crimeea; Dobrogea; Doneţ; Marea Neagră; Nipru; Nistru; Odessa; Prut; Stalingrad; Don; Traditia
- Status: Obsolete
- Established: April 1, 1942
- First award: 1942
- Final award: 1944

The Medalia Cruciada împotriva comunismului ("Crusade Against Communism medal", in reference to Operation Barbarossa) was a Romanian military award of World War II. It was instituted on April 1, 1942, by the Royal Decree No. 1014, of King Michael I of Romania. It was commissioned to recognise the distinguished service of Romanian and other Axis powers military and civilian personnel operating on both the Eastern and Home fronts.

== Medal ==
The medal, of 31.5 mm in diameter and of brass construction features on the front side a clenched fist holding a sword representative of the campaign. The same side also displays the date 1941 and around its circumference is written CRUCIADA ÎMPOTRIVA COMUNISMULUI. The reverse side features the Romanian liberty symbol and the phrase ROMÂNIA RECUNOSCĂTOARE, translated in English as "Romania is Grateful". The reverse sometimes features the name "P. GRANT" under the liberty symbol. The medal is suspended by medal ribbon which is of primarily of red, bordered by white and the centre featuring the national colours of Romania, red, yellow and blue.

== Bars ==
When issued to the recipients operating on the front lines one of 15 bars was included indicative of area of service. Like the medal, these were brass-made and worn over the ribbon bar. The bars stood for:

- Azov
- Basarabia
- Bucovina
- Southern Bug
- Calmucia
- Caucaz
- Crimeea (occasionally spelled Crimeia)
- Dobrogea
- Doneţ
- Marea Neagră (occasionally spelled Mare Negru)
- Nipru
- Nistru
- Odessa
- Prut
- Stalingrad
- Don
- Traditia

Bars awarded subsequently were worn below the original one on the medal ribbon, and all of the additional bars were silver. The rarest of all bars is the Stalingrad one, due largely to the fact that very few Axis survived the 1943 battle (those recipients who were captured often lost or discarded their awards, or had these confiscated).

== Other characteristics ==
The medal continued to be awarded until its disestablishment in October 1944, after Romania joined the Allies, and issued retrospectively to the starting date of Operation Barbarossa (the Axis invasion of the Soviet Union). Cruciada împotriva comunismului was produced by a number of firms within Romania, and was also made under licence by the German maker C. E. Junker of Berlin. The number of medals made and awarded is unknown, but believed to be in excess of 1,250,000.

Whilst not rare today, following the war, many awards were discarded by their owners for fear of prosecution and reprisal by the Soviet occupiers and later by Communist authorities.

== See also ==
- List of military decorations#Romania
- Eastern Front (World War II)
- Romania during World War II
