= Heiligenbeil concentration camp =

Heiligenbeil
- Subcamp of the Stutthof concentration camp
- Coordinates: 54°29′30″N 19°56′03″E
- Known for: Forced labour
- Location: Mamonovo
- Commandant: Hermann Kleiss, September–October 1944; Johann Mayer, October–November 1944; Ernst Thulke, October 1944–January 1945; Wolförer, January 1945
- Operational: 21 September 1944 – ca. 20 January 1945
- Inmates: Jewish women and men

Heiligenbeil was a subcamp of the German Stutthof concentration camp, operated from September 1944 to January 1945. It was named after the town Heiligenbeil (now Mamonovo, Russia).

Its prisoners were 1,100 Jewish women and 100 Jewish men. The prisoners were subjected to forced labour.

The commanders of the subcamp were SS-Unterscharführer Hermann Kleiss (in September–October 1944), SS-Oberscharführer Johann Mayer (October–November 1944), SS-Hauptscharführer Ernst Thulke (October 1944–January 1945) and SS-Sturmscharführer Wolförer (January 1945).
