= Winrich von Kniprode =

22nd Grand Master of the Teutonic Knights

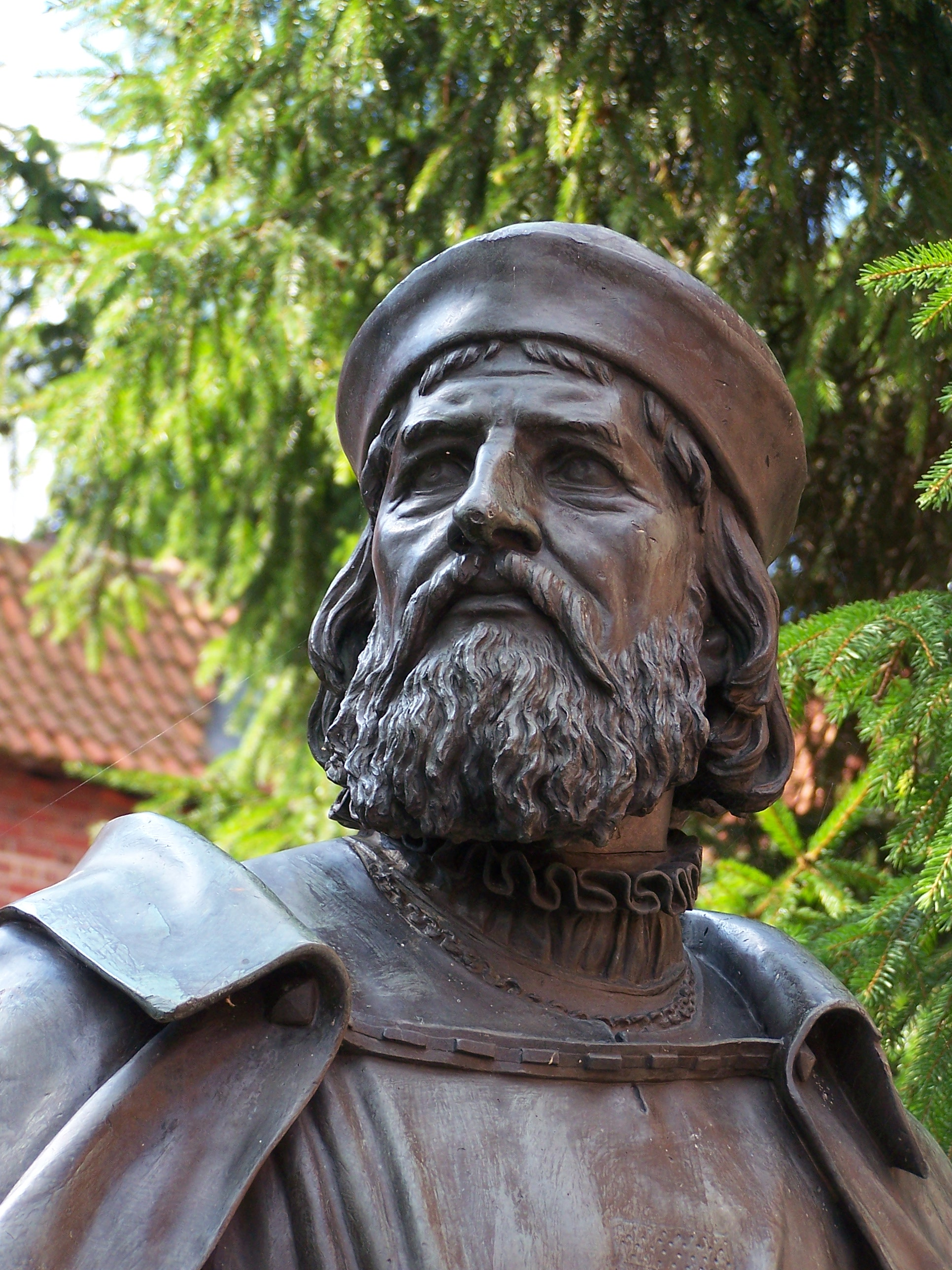
Statue of Winrich von Kniprode at Malbork Castle

Portrait of Winrich von Kniprode

Winrich von Kniprode (c. 1310 - 24 June 1382) was the 22nd Grand Master of the Teutonic Order. He was the longest serving Grand Master, holding the position for 31 years (1351–1382). His winning personality and his sense of tact and tone won the Order many friends within the nobility of Germany, France and England. Under his leadership, the Teutonic Order came to be characterized by knightly life and courtly culture.

Winrich von Kniprode was born in 1310 in Kniprath, now part of Monheim am Rhein, near Cologne. He served as the Komtur of Danzig (1338–1341) and Balga (1341–1343). In 1341 he was promoted to the Grand Marshal.

Winrich was elected Grand Master in 1351, and with his guidance The Teutonic Order enabled the Baltic Crusades to reach a moral peak. He constantly fought with the Grand Duchy of Lithuania to gain access to Livonia. He achieved a victory in the Battle of Rudau. The victory was attributed to the Virgin Mary and in her honor Kniprode established the Augustinian convent at Heiligenbeil (Mamonovo). The battle marked the last serious threat from the Lithuanians in Prussia in the 14th century.

During his time as Grand Master, he also enhanced the look of Marienburg Castle, with more comfort and bigger scale. For this his reputation grew far beyond the borders of The Holy Roman Empire.

Winrich died in 1382 and was buried in Marienburg Castle in the mausoleum under the Chapel of St. Anna.

As a consequence of his long rule during a period of relative economic and military stability, Winrich von Kniprode is considered to be one of the most well-known Grand Masters of the Teutonic Order, along Hermann von Salza. Several German cities have streets named after him, and a catholic elementary school in his presumed place of birth, Monheim am Rhein, carries his name.

== Sources ==
- Christiansen, Eric (1997). The Northern Crusades (2nd ed.). London: Penguin Books. ISBN 0-14-026653-4.
- Friedrich, Borchert (2001) "Die Hochmeister des Deutschen Ordens in Preußen."Preußische Allgemeine Zeitung
- Urban, William (2003). The Teutonic Knights. London. Greenhill Books. ISBN 91-518-4478-8.
- Urban, William (2006). Samogitian Crusade. Chicago: Lithuanian Research and Studies Center. ISBN 0-929700-56-2.

Grand Master of the Teutonic Order
Preceded by Heinrich Dusemer	Hochmeister; 1351–1382	Succeeded by Conrad Zöllner von Rothenstein
