= Mamonovo =

Town in Kaliningrad Oblast, Russia

Mamonovo Мамоново
- Town
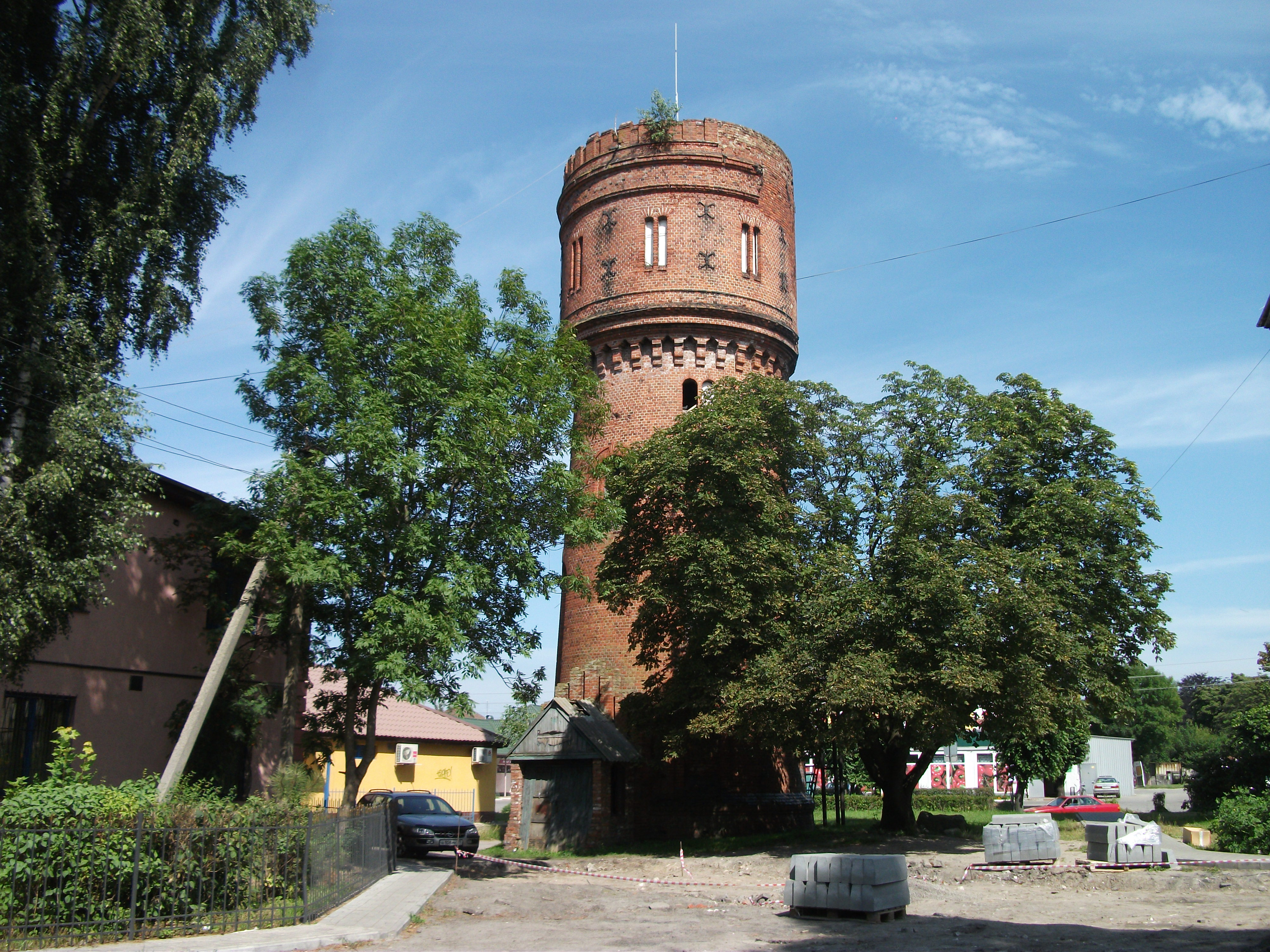
- Water tower in Mamonovo

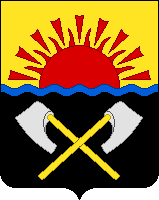
- Coat of arms
- Interactive map of Mamonovo
- Location of Mamonovo Mamonovo (European Russia) Mamonovo (Europe) Mamonovo (Russia)
- Coordinates: 54°27′50″N 19°56′29″E
- Country: Russia
- Federal subject: Kaliningrad Oblast
- Founded: 1301 (Julian)
- Town status since: 1301
- Elevation: 15 m (49 ft)

Population (2010 Census)
  - Total: 7,761
  - Estimate (2023): 8,295 (+6.9%)

Administrative status
  - Subordinated to: town of oblast significance of Mamonovo
  - Capital of: town of oblast significance of Mamonovo

Municipal status
  - Urban okrug: Mamonovsky Urban Okrug
  - Capital of: Mamonovsky Urban Okrug
- Time zone: UTC+2 (MSK–1)
- Postal code: 238450
- OKTMO ID: 27712000001

Mamonovo (Russian: Мамоново, German: Heiligenbeil, Polish: Święta Siekierka or Świętomiejsce) is a town in Kaliningrad Oblast, Russia, near the border with Poland. Population figures: 7,761 (2010 census); 7,393 (2002 census); 7,816 (1989 Soviet census).

== Etymology ==
Mamonovo is named after a Soviet Commander, Nikolay Vasilyevich Mamonov, killed in action near Pułtusk on October 26, 1944, who was posthumously awarded the title Hero of the Soviet Union on March 24, 1945.

== History ==
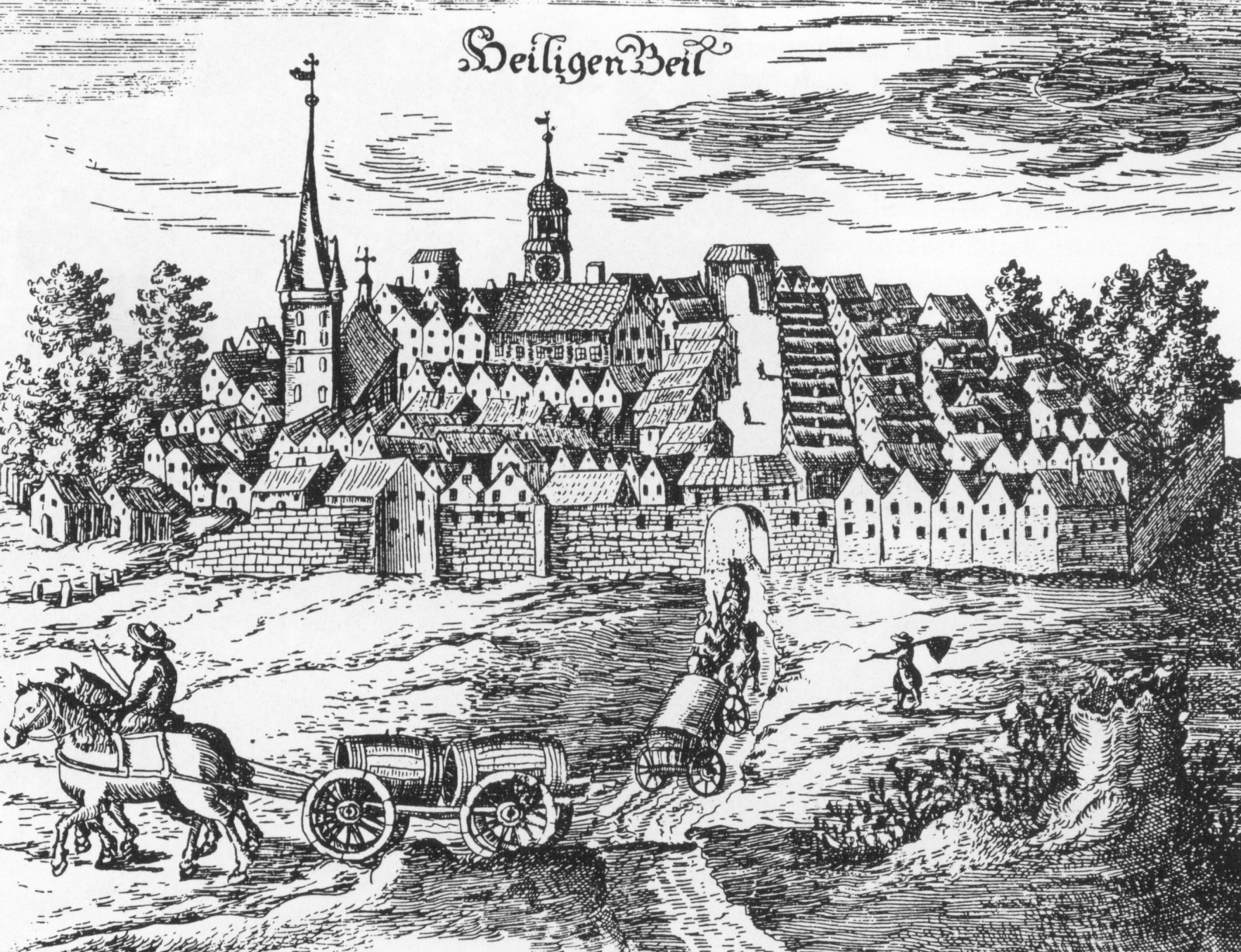
Heiligenbeil in the 17th century

Under the Teutonic Knights Heiligenstadt was built near an Old Prussian settlement. It was granted town rights in 1301. It was later renamed Heiligenbeil after a holy axe used by Augustinian monks, established in the area by Grand Master Winrich von Kniprode after the Battle of Rudau, to cut down an oak tree worshiped by pagan Prussians. It came under the bishopric of Warmia, then to the territory of Natangia. Since 1440, the town was a founding member of the Prussian Confederation, which rebelled against the Teutonic Order and upon the request of which, Polish King Casimir IV Jagiellon incorporated the region and town to the Kingdom of Poland in 1454. Then the Thirteen Years' War, the longest of all Polish–Teutonic wars, broke out. After the war, the town once again became part of the State of the Teutonic Order, which from then on was a fief of Poland, and after 1525 it formed part of secular Ducal Prussia. The town's seal was attached to the documents of the peace treaty of 1466. The area was home to a mixed population with several villages founded by the Poles in the 15th century.

From 1701, the town was part of the Kingdom of Prussia. In 1735, a mission house was established by Jesuits from the nearby Polish town of Braniewo. From 1758 to 1762 it was occupied by Russia during the Seven Years' War, then restored to Prussia, and from 1871 it was also part of Germany, within which it was located in the province of East Prussia. In the late 19th century, the inhabitants were mostly employed in farming and cattle and horse breeding. The town sold sizable amounts of barley, rye and oats to Silesia, Saxony and Berlin, and flour to Gdańsk, Brunswick, Berlin and surrounding towns.

During World War II, in 1944–1945, it was the location of the Heiligenbeil concentration camp, a subcamp of the Stutthof concentration camp, in which the Germans imprisoned around 1,100 Jewish women and 100 Jewish men as forced labour. There were also forced labour camps for French POWs and Russians. Towards the end of the war in fierce fighting between January and March 1945 the Heiligenbeil pocket fell to the Red Army on March 26, 1945. The town initially passed to Poland under its historic Polish name Święta Siekierka, however, it was soon unilaterally annexed by the Soviet Union in violation of the Polish-Soviet border agreement, and integrated into the Kaliningrad Oblast. It took its present name in 1946. The defending 4th Army's archives were buried in a forest near the town and found in 2004, in an area still littered with debris from the final battles.

== Administrative and municipal status ==
Within the framework of administrative divisions, it is, together with four rural localities, incorporated as the town of oblast significance of Mamonovo — an administrative unit with the status equal to that of the districts. As a municipal division, the town of oblast significance of Mamonovo is incorporated as Mamonovsky Urban Okrug.

== Notable people ==
- Rudolf von Auerswald (1795–1866) in 1824 he acquired an estate in the Heiligenbeil District and became Landrat (district administrator)
