= List of Knight's Cross of the Iron Cross recipients (A) =

The Knight's Cross of the Iron Cross (German: Ritterkreuz des Eisernen Kreuzes) and its variants were the highest awards in the military and paramilitary forces of Nazi Germany during World War II. The Knight's Cross of the Iron Cross was awarded for a wide range of reasons and across all ranks, from a senior commander for skilled leadership of his troops in battle to a low-ranking soldier for a single act of extreme gallantry. A total of 7,321 awards were made between its first presentation on 30 September 1939 and its last bestowal on 17 June 1945. (Note: Großadmiral and President of Germany Karl Dönitz, Hitler's successor as Head of State (Staatsoberhaupt) and Supreme Commander of the Armed Forces, had ordered the cessation of all promotions and awards as of 11 May 1945 (Dönitz-decree). Consequently the last Knight's Cross awarded to Oberleutnant zur See of the Reserves Georg-Wolfgang Feller on 17 June 1945 must therefore be considered a de facto but not de jure hand-out.) This number is based on the analysis and acceptance of the order commission of the Association of Knight's Cross Recipients (AKCR). Presentations were made to members of the three military branches of the Wehrmacht—the Heer (Army), Kriegsmarine (Navy) and Luftwaffe (Air Force)—as well as the Waffen-SS, the Reichsarbeitsdienst (RAD—Reich Labour Service) and the Volkssturm (German national militia). There were also 43 recipients in the military forces of allies of the Third Reich.

These recipients are listed in the 1986 edition of Walther-Peer Fellgiebel's book, Die Träger des Ritterkreuzes des Eisernen Kreuzes 1939–1945 [The Bearers of the Knight's Cross of the Iron Cross 1939–1945]. Fellgiebel was the former chairman and head of the order commission of the AKCR. In 1996, the second edition of this book was published with an addendum delisting 11 of these original recipients. Author Veit Scherzer has cast doubt on a further 193 of these listings. The majority of the disputed recipients had been nominated for the award in 1945, when the deteriorating situation of Germany during the final days of World War II left a number of nominations incomplete and pending in various stages of the approval process.

Listed here are the 118 Knight's Cross recipients of the Wehrmacht and Waffen-SS whose last name starts with "A". Fellgiebel himself delisted one and Scherzer has challenged the validity of three more of these listings. The recipients are initially ordered alphabetically by last name. The rank listed is the recipient's rank at the time the Knight's Cross was awarded.

== Background ==
The Knight's Cross of the Iron Cross and its higher grades were based on four separate enactments. The first enactment, Reichsgesetzblatt I S. 1573 of 1 September 1939 instituted the Iron Cross (Eisernes Kreuz), the Knight's Cross of the Iron Cross and the Grand Cross of the Iron Cross (Großkreuz des Eisernen Kreuzes). Article 2 of the enactment mandated that the award of a higher class be preceded by the award of all preceding classes. As the war progressed, some of the recipients of the Knight's Cross distinguished themselves further and a higher grade, the Knight's Cross of the Iron Cross with Oak Leaves (Ritterkreuz des Eisernen Kreuzes mit Eichenlaub), was instituted. The Oak Leaves, as they were commonly referred to, were based on the enactment Reichsgesetzblatt I S. 849 of 3 June 1940. In 1941, two higher grades of the Knight's Cross were instituted. The enactment Reichsgesetzblatt I S. 613 of 28 September 1941 introduced the Knight's Cross of the Iron Cross with Oak Leaves and Swords (Ritterkreuz des Eisernen Kreuzes mit Eichenlaub und Schwertern) and the Knight's Cross of the Iron Cross with Oak Leaves, Swords and Diamonds (Ritterkreuz des Eisernen Kreuzes mit Eichenlaub, Schwertern und Brillanten). At the end of 1944 the final grade, the Knight's Cross of the Iron Cross with Golden Oak Leaves, Swords, and Diamonds (Ritterkreuz des Eisernen Kreuzes mit goldenem Eichenlaub, Schwertern und Brillanten), based on the enactment Reichsgesetzblatt 1945 I S. 11 of 29 December 1944, became the final variant of the Knight's Cross authorized.

== Recipients ==
Knight's Cross of the Iron Cross (A)
Service	Number of presentations	Posthumous presentations
Heer	79	5
Kriegsmarine	2	0
Luftwaffe	26	4
Waffen-SS	11	2

The Oberkommando der Wehrmacht (Supreme Command of the Armed Forces) kept separate Knight's Cross lists for the Heer (Army), Kriegsmarine (Navy), Luftwaffe (Air Force) and Waffen-SS. Within each of these lists a unique sequential number was assigned to each recipient. The same numbering paradigm was applied to the higher grades of the Knight's Cross, one list per grade. Of the 118 awards made to servicemen whose last name starts with "A", nine were later awarded the Knight's Cross of the Iron Cross with Oak Leaves and 11 presentations were made posthumously. Heer members received 79 of the medals, two went to the Kriegsmarine, 26 to the Luftwaffe, and 11 to the Waffen-SS.

This along with the + (plus) indicates that a higher grade of Knight's Cross was awarded as well.
This along with the * (asterisk) indicates that the Knight's Cross was awarded posthumously.
This along with the ! (exclamation mark) indicates that author Walther-Peer Fellgiebel has expressed doubt regarding the veracity or formal correctness of the listing.
This along with the ? (question mark) indicates that author Veit Scherzer has expressed doubt regarding the veracity or formal correctness of the listing.

Name	Service	Rank	Role and unit (Note: For an explanation of the various naming schemes used by the Luftwaffe, Heer, Kriegsmarine and Waffen-SS refer to nomenclature used by the Wehrmacht and Waffen-SS.)	Date of award	Notes	Image
Adolf Abel	Heer	Major	Commander of I./Grenadier-Regiment 364	23 September 1943	—	—
Josef Abel	Heer	Oberfeldwebel	Zugführer (platoon leader) in the 7./Infanterie-Regiment 217	23 November 1941	—	—
Arnulf Abele	Heer	Hauptmann	Commander of the I./Reichsgrenadier-Regiment "Hoch und Deutschmeister"	12 February 1944	—	—
Erich Abraham+	Heer	Oberst	Commander of Infanterie-Regiment 230	13 November 1942	Awarded 516th Oak Leaves 26 June 1944	—
Erich Abraham	Heer	Leutnant of the Reserves	Leader of the 2./Panzergrenadier-Regiment 13	20 January 1944*	Killed in action 8 December 1943	—
Herbert Abratis	Luftwaffe	Hauptmann	Leader of the II./Fallschirmjäger-Regiment 1	24 October 1944	—	A man wearing a peaked cap and military uniform with an Iron Cross displayed at the front of his uniform collar.
Albrecht Achilles	Kriegsmarine	Kapitänleutnant	Commander of U-161	16 January 1943	—	—
Georg Ackermann	Luftwaffe	Leutnant (Note: According to Scherzer as Leutnant of the Reserves and Staffelkapitän and technical officer of the Stab II./Kampfgeschwader 53 "Legion Condor".)	Staffelkapitän and technical officer in the 5./Kampfgeschwader 53 "Legion Condor"	28 February 1945	—	—
Helmut Adam	Heer	Oberleutnant	Chief of the 3./Sturmgeschütz-Abteilung 192	21 November 1941	—	—
Paul Adam	Heer	Major of the Reserves	Leader of Grenadier-Regiment 158	18 April 1943	—	—
Wilhelm Adam	Heer	Oberst	Adjutant of Armeeoberkommando 6 (Supreme Command of the 6th Army)	17 December 1942	—	
Felix Adamowitsch	Heer	Hauptmann	Chief of the 3./Sturmgeschütz-Brigade 904	20 October 1944	—	—
Miervaldis Ādamsons	Waffen-SS	SS-Untersturmführer	Chief of the 6./Waffen Grenadier-Regiment 44 (lettische Nr. 6) der SS	25 January 1945	—	—
Horst Ademeit+	Luftwaffe	Leutnant	Pilot in the I./Jagdgeschwader 54	16 April 1943	Awarded 414th Oak Leaves 2 March 1944	
Paul Adolff	Luftwaffe	Hauptmann of the Reserves	Leader of Fallschirm-Pionier-Bataillon 1	26 March 1944*	Killed in action 17 July 1943	—
Walter Adolph	Luftwaffe	Hauptmann	Gruppenkommandeur of the II./Jagdgeschwader 26 "Schlageter"	13 November 1940	—	
Friedrich Adrario	Heer	Hauptmann	Leader of the Panzer-Jäger-Abteilung 272	26 December 1944	—	—
Josef-Hubert Adrian	Heer	Oberfeldwebel	Leader of the 6./Grenadier-Regiment 24	28 March 1945	—	—
Fritz Aechtner	Luftwaffe	Oberfeldwebel	Pilot and observer in the 1./Nahaufklärungs-Gruppe 5 (Note: According to Scherzer as pilot and observer in the 1./Nahaufklärungs-Gruppe 3.)	20 December 1944	—	—
Eckart Afheldt	Heer	Oberleutnant	Leader of the II./Jäger-Regiment 2 "Brandenburg"	17 March 1945	—	—
Egon Aghta+	Heer	Oberleutnant (W) of the Reserves (Note: The suffix W in brackets after the rank denotes a Feuerwerker (pyrotechnician).)	Leader of a bomb disposal commando in the Luftgaukommando III Berlin	3 February 1945	Awarded 778th Oak Leaves 12 March 1945	—
Heinrich-Wilhelm Ahnert	Luftwaffe	Oberfeldwebel	Pilot in the I./Jagdgeschwader 52 (Note: According to Scherzer in the 3./Jagdgeschwader 52.)	23 August 1942*	Killed in action 23 August 1942	—
Albert Ahrens	Heer	Oberfeldwebel	Zugführer (platoon leader) in the 3./Panzer-Jäger-Abteilung 31	25 July 1943	—	—
Hinrich Ahrens	Heer	Unteroffizier	Gun commander in the 13./Grenadier-Regiment 1141	9 January 1945	—	—
Wilhelm Ahrens	Heer	Hauptmann	Commander of the III.(Jäger)/Grenadier-Regiment 17	4 May 1944	—	—
Reinhard Aigen	Luftwaffe	Oberfeldwebel	Board mechanic in the 7./Kampfgeschwader 4	9 June 1944*	Killed in action 19 September 1943	—
Hermann Alber	Waffen-SS	SS-Sturmmann	Company messenger in the 9./SS-Panzergrenadier-Regiment 20 "Hohenstaufen"	16 December 1944*	Killed in action 2 August 1944	—
Robert Alber	Heer	Hauptmann of the Reserves	Leader of the I./Panzer-Regiment 201	7 September 1943	—	—
Hans-Wilhelm Albers	Heer	Hauptmann	Commander of the I./Artillerie-Regiment 1 "Afrika"	10 May 1943	—	—
Wilhelm Albert	Heer	Hauptmann of the Reserves	Company chief in the Panzer-Jäger-Abteilung 35	14 February 1945	—	—
Otto Alberts	Heer	Oberst of the Reserves	Commander of Grenadier-Regiment 501	10 December 1943	Died of wounds 10 December 1943	—
Egon Albrecht (Note: According to Scherzer last name is Albrecht-Lemke.)	Luftwaffe	Oberleutnant	Staffelführer of the 9./Zerstörergeschwader 76 (Note: According to Scherzer as Staffelkapitän of the 6./Zerstörergeschwader 1.)	22 May 1943	—	A man wearing a military uniform with various military decorations including an Iron Cross displayed at the front of his uniform collar.
Fritz Albrecht	Heer	Oberst	Leader of a Kampfgruppe in the defensive sector of Magdeburg	19 April 1945	—	—
Kurt Albrecht	Heer	Oberst	Commander of Artillerie-Regiment 172	3 November 1944	—	—
Kurt Albrecht	Heer	Oberst of the Reserves	Commander of Grenadier-Regiment 948	28 February 1945	—	—
Oskar Albrecht	Heer	Unteroffizier	Geschützführer (gun layer) in the 14.(Jäger)/Infanterie-Regiment 15	24 July 1941	—	—
Willy Albrecht? (Note: No evidence of the award can be found in the German Federal Archives. Willy Albrecht's case was never processed by the Association of Knight's Cross Recipients (AKCR). It is incomprehensible what evidence exists and who accepted him as a Knight's Cross recipient.)	Heer	Hauptmann of the Reserves	Commander of the I./Jäger-Regiment 734	9 May 1945	—	—
Rudolf Albust	Heer	Obergefreiter	Richtschütze (gunner) in the 2./Panzer-Jäger-Abteilung 129	19 December 1943	—	—
Ernst Alex	Heer	Oberwachtmeister	Zugführer (platoon leader) in the 1./Sturmgeschütz-Abteilung 243	1 August 1941	—	—
Heinz Allersmeier	Heer	Major of the Reserves	Leader of the Feldersatz-Bataillon 181 (Note: According to Scherzer as leader of the Feldersatz-Bataillon 81.)	9 December 1944	—	—
Friedrich Allmacher	Heer	Hauptmann of the Reserves	Commander of the III./Grenadier-Regiment 366	7 March 1944	—	—
Karl Allmendinger+	Heer	Generalmajor	Commander of the 5. Infanterie-Division	17 July 1941	Awarded 153rd Oak Leaves 13 December 1942	—
Karl Alm	Heer	Hauptmann	Leader of the II./Grenadier-Regiment 353	12 August 1944	—	—
Friedrich Alpers	Luftwaffe	Major (Note: According to Scherzer as Major of the Reserves.)	Commander of Fernaufklärungs-Gruppe 4	14 October 1942	—	—
Eduard Altacher	Heer	Hauptmann	Leader of the II./Gebirgsjäger-Regiment 143	18 November 1944	—	—
Karl-Heinz Altermann	Heer	Oberleutnant	Chief of the 1./Panzergrenadier-Regiment 25	4 October 1944	—	—
Gustav Altmann	Luftwaffe	Oberleutnant	Leader of Sturmgruppe "Stahl" in the Fallschirmjäger-Sturm Abteilung "Koch"	12 May 1940	—	—
Rudolf Altstadt	Heer	Hauptmann of the Reserves	Commander of the I./Grenadier-Regiment 380	14 May 1944	—	—
Gustav Alvermann	Heer	Hauptmann of the Reserves	Chief of the 10./Infanterie-Regiment 47	26 May 1940	—	—
Herbert Amann	Heer	Oberleutnant	Chief of the 1./Sturmgeschütz-Abteilung 905	10 February 1944*	Died of wounds 12 January 1944	—
Paul Amann (Note: According to Scherzer name is Paul Ammann who had received the Knight's Cross of the Iron Cross as Oberfeldwebel and pilot and oberserver in the 3./Kampfgeschwader 4 "General Wever".)	Luftwaffe	Oberfeldwebel	Observer in the 3./Kampfgeschwader 4 "General Wever"	12 March 1945	—	—
Dr. Lothar Ambrosius	Heer	Oberst	Leader of Divisions-Kampfgruppe 268	24 January 1944	—	—
Anton Ameiser	Waffen-SS	SS-Sturmbannführer of the Reserves	Leader of SS Freiwilligen-Kavallerie-Regiment 52 "Ungarn"	1 November 1944	—	—
Günter Amelung	Heer	Leutnant of the Reserves	Leader of the 5./Schnelle Abteilung 123	15 January 1943	—	—
Heinz-Günter Amelung	Luftwaffe	Hauptmann	Staffelkapitän of the 5./Sturzkampfgeschwader 77	15 July 1942	—	—
Siegfried Amerkamp	Heer	Obergefreiter	Machine gunner and deputy group leader in the Sturmkompanie/Grenadier-Regiment 459	22 November 1943 (Note: According to Scherzer on 24 November 1943.)	—	—
Fritz Amling	Heer	Wachtmeister	Zugführer (platoon leader) in the 3./Sturmgeschütz-Abteilung 202	11 December 1942	—	—
Franz Ammann	Heer	Leutnant of the Reserves	Leader of 5./Grenadier-Regiment 256	23 August 1943	—	—
Hermann Ammer	Heer	Oberleutnant of the Reserves	Leader of the II./Grenadier-Regiment 62	12 October 1943	—	—
Joachim von Amsberg? (Note: The nomination by the troop was rejected on 9 May 1945 by the commanding officer of the Außenstelle of the Heerespersonalamt (HPA/A—Branch of the Army Staff Office)—Oberst Goecke—because the intermittent commanding officers of Joachim von Amsberg had not approved the nomination. The Order Commission of the Association of Knight's Cross Recipients (AKCR) processed the case in 1981 and decided: "Knight's Cross yes, 6 May 1945". The presentation date was later changed again by Fellgiebel to 9 May 1945. Von Amsberg was a member of the AKCR.)	Heer	Oberst	Commander of Grenadier-Regiment 502	9 May 1945	—	—
Roberts Ancāns	Waffen-SS	Waffen-Untersturmführer	Leader of Waffen Feld Ersatz-Bataillon der SS Nr. 19 (Note: According to Scherzer as leader of the Divisionskampfschule (divisions combat school) of the 19. Waffen-Grenadier-Division of the SS (lettische Nr. 2).)	25 January 1945	—	—
Carl Anders	Heer	Oberst	Commander of Grenadier-Regiment 484	4 May 1944	—	—
Friedrich Anders	Heer	Oberfeldwebel	Zugführer (platoon leader) in the 3./Panzer-Aufklärungs-Abteilung 2	14 August 1943	—	—
Richard Anders	Luftwaffe	Oberleutnant	Pilot in the 11.(H)/Nahaufklärungs-Gruppe 12 (Note: According to Scherzer as pilot in the Nahaufklärungs-Staffel 11.(H)/12.)	27 July 1944	—	—
Kurt Andersen	Luftwaffe	Oberst	Commander of Flak-Regiment 153	23 December 1942 (Note: According to Scherzer on 21 December 1942.)	—	
Friedrich Anding	Heer	Leutnant	Adjudant of Panzer-Jäger-Abteilung "Großdeutschland"	8 May 1945	—	—
Anton Andorfer	Luftwaffe	Oberleutnant	Staffelführer of the 2./Sturzkampfgeschwader 77 (Note: According to Scherzer as Staffelkapitän of the 8./Sturzkampfgeschwader 77.)	26 March 1944	—	—
Wolf Andreae	Heer	Oberst	Commander of Werfer-Regiment 71	24 June 1944	—	—
Harry Andree	Heer	Major	Commander of the I./Grenadier-Regiment 504	4 May 1944	—	—
Ernst Andres	Luftwaffe	Oberleutnant	Pilot in the Stabsstaffel/Kampfgeschwader 2	20 April 1944	—	—
Hans Andres	Heer	Obergefreiter	1st machine gunner in the 2./Panzergrenadier-Regiment 128	4 May 1944*	Died of wounds 25 March 1944	—
Otto Angel	Heer	Unteroffizier of the Reserves (Note: According to Scherzer as Unteroffizier and not as Unteroffizier of the Reserves.)	Zugführer (platoon leader) in the Panzer-Jäger-Abteilung 6	15 March 1945	—	—
Maximilian de Angelis+	Heer	Generalleutnant	Commander of the 76. Infanterie-Division	9 February 1942	Awarded 323rd Oak Leaves 12 November 1943	—
Heinz Angelmaier	Heer	Hauptmann of the Reserves	Leader of the Sturmgeschütz-Brigade 279	18 February 1945	—	—
Günther Angern	Heer	Oberst	Commander of the 11. Schützen-Brigade	5 August 1940	—	
Karl Angerstein	Luftwaffe	Oberst	Geschwaderkommodore of Kampfgeschwader 1 "Hindenburg"	2 November 1940	—	—
Günther Anhalt	Waffen-SS	SS-Standartenführer and Oberst of the Schupo	Commander of SS-Polizei-Regiment 2	12 August 1944	—	—
Wilhelm Anhalt	Kriegsmarine	Kapitänleutnant	Chief of the 4. Räumbootflottille	3 July 1944	—	—
Udo Anneken	Heer	Leutnant of the Reserves	Leader of the 1./Füsilier-Bataillon 83	9 June 1944	—	—
Žanis Ansons	Waffen-SS	Waffen-Hauptscharführer	Zugführer (platoon leader) in the 3./Waffen Grenadier-Regiment 44 der SS (Note: According to Scherzer as Zugführer (platoon leader) in the 3./Waffen Grenadier-Regiment 44 der SS (lettische Nr. 6).)	16 January 1945	—	—
Werner Anton	Luftwaffe	Generalmajor	Commander of the 6. Flak-Division (motorized)	11 June 1944 (Note: According to Scherzer on 9 June 1944.)	—	—
Wilhelm Antrup+	Luftwaffe	Hauptmann	Staffelkapitän of the 5./Kampfgeschwader 55	13 November 1942	Awarded 655th Oak Leaves 18 November 1944	—
Wilhelm von Apell	Heer	Generalmajor	Commander of the 9. Schützen-Brigade	14 May 1941	—	—
Fedor Apelt	Heer	Oberst	Commander of Grenadier-Regiment 102	8 February 1944	—	—
Kārlis Aperāts	Waffen-SS	Waffen-Obersturmbannführer	Commander of Waffen-Grenadier-Regiment 32 (lettische Nr. 1) der SS	21 September 1944	—	
Willy Apitz	Heer	Obergefreiter	Radio/wireless operator in the 10./Artillerie-Regiment 81	1 January 1944	—	—
Karl-Arthur Apitzsch	Heer	Oberleutnant	Vorgeschobener Beobachter (artillery observer) in the 4./Artillerie-Regiment 3 (motorized)	4 November 1943*	Died in a Soviet POW camp in 1943	—
Kurt Arendt	Heer	Hauptmann	Commander of Panzer-Abteilung 5	24 February 1945*	Killed in action 9 January 1945	—
Velten Arendt	Heer	Hauptmann (Note: According to Scherzer as Hauptmann of the Reserves.)	Leader of the I./Panzer-Regiment 36	28 March 1945	—	—
Peter Arent! (Note: According to Fellgiebel Peter Arent is delisted without reason.)	Luftwaffe	Oberfeldwebel	Pioneer Zugführer (platoon leader) in the Stabskompanie/Fallschirmjäger-Regiment 5	4 December 1942*	Killed in action 3 December 1942	A man wearing a military uniform.
Alexander von Arentschildt	Heer	Hauptmann	Chief of the 2./Panzer-Abteilung 67	5 August 1940	—	—
Josef Armberger	Waffen-SS	SS-Obersturmführer	Chief of the 8./SS-Panzer-Regiment 1 "Leibstandarte SS Adolf Hitler"	31 October 1944*	Killed in action 20 August 1944	—
Fritz Arndt+	Heer	Obergefreiter	Machine gunner in the Stabskompanie/Panzer-Pionier-Bataillon 32	31 March 1943	Awarded 678th Oak Leaves 9 December 1944	—
Johannes Arndt	Heer	Oberstleutnant	Commander of Grenadier-Regiment 391	23 February 1944	—	—
Karl Arndt+	Heer	Oberst	Commander of Infanterie-Regiment 511	23 January 1942	Awarded 719th Oak Leaves 1 February 1945	—
Hans-Jürgen von Arnim	Heer	Generalleutnant	Commander of the 17. Panzer-Division	4 September 1941	—	A man wearing peaked cap and a military uniform.
Karl Arning	Heer	Oberst	Commander of Grenadier-Regiment 24	11 October 1943	—	—
Friedrich Arnold	Heer	Oberleutnant of the Reserves	Zugführer (platoon leader) in the 2./Sturmgeschütz-Brigade 237	16 November 1943	—	—
Helmut Arpke	Luftwaffe	Feldwebel	Member of Sturmgruppe "Stahl" in the Fallschirmjäger-Sturm Abteilung "Koch"	13 May 1940	—	A man wearing a military uniform with an Iron Cross displayed at the front of his uniform collar.
Dietrich Ascher	Heer	Leutnant of the Reserves	Zugführer (platoon leader) in the 2./Sturmgeschütz-Brigade 259	28 February 1945	—	—
Willi Ascherfeld	Heer	Hauptmann of the Reserves	Commander of the II./Grenadier-Regiment 926	14 February 1945	—	—
Alois Assmann	Heer	Obergefreiter	Richtschütze (gunner) in the 1./Panzer-Jäger-Abteilung 61	18 September 1942	—	—
Dr. med.dent. Walter Assmann	Heer	Generalmajor	Commander of the 101. Jäger-Division	10 February 1945	—	A man wearing a military uniform.
Franz-Xaver Attenberger	Heer	Stabsgefreiter	Driver in the 3./Artillerie-Regiment 114	21 January 1945	—	—
Georg Audenrieth	Heer	Stabsgefreiter	Group leader in the 3./Gebirgsjäger-Regiment 99	10 February 1945	—	—
Paul Audorff	Heer	Oberstleutnant	Commander of Grenadier-Regiment 754	13 May 1943	—	—
Karl Auer	Waffen-SS	SS-Hauptsturmführer	Leader of the I./SS-Polizei-Panzergrenadier-Regiment 8	31 October 1944	—	—
Heinz Auert	Heer	Leutnant of the Reserves	Leader of the 2./Panzer-Aufklärungs-Abteilung 116	28 February 1945	—	—
Hans-Heinz Augenstein	Luftwaffe	Oberleutnant	Staffelführer of the 7./Nachtjagdgeschwader 1	9 June 1944	—	—
Franz Augsberger	Waffen-SS	SS-Brigadeführer and Generalmajor of the Waffen-SS	Commander of the 20. Waffen-Grenadier-Division der SS (estnische Nr. 1)	8 March 1945	—	
Andreas von Aulock+	Heer	Oberst	Commander of Grenadier-Regiment 226	6 November 1943	Awarded 551st Oak Leaves 16 August 1944	—
Hans Austen	Heer	Hauptmann	Commander of the II./Grenadier-Regiment 487	5 December 1943	—	—
Johannes Austermann	Heer	Major	Commander of the II./Grenadier-Regiment 1146	10 February 1945	—	—
Adolf Ax? (Note: Adolf Ax's nomination shows no indication that the request had been processed or granted, not even an entry date is noted. The nomination list indicates that the request was filed on 28 April 1945. A Heerespersonalamt (HPA—Army Staff Office) nomination with the number 5092 had been created. The nomination, according to the book "Verliehene Ritterkreuze" (Awarded Knight Crosses), was forwarded to the HPA on 25 April 1945. No proof exists that the Knight's Cross was awarded. The Order Commission of the Association of Knight's Cross Recipients (AKCR) processed this case in 1981 and decided: "Knight's Cross yes, 9 May 1945". Ax was member of the AKCR.)	Waffen-SS	SS-Oberführer	Leader of the 15. Waffen Grenadier-Division der SS (lettische Nr. 1)	9 May 1945	—	—
Erich Axthammer	Luftwaffe	Feldwebel	Pilot in the Stab/Schlachtgeschwader 10	28 April 1945	—	—
Walther von Axthelm	Luftwaffe	Generalmajor	Commanding general of the I. Flak-Korps	4 September 1941	—	Man in uniform
Fritz Axtmann	Heer	Oberfeldwebel	Company troop leader in the 7./Infanterie-Regiment 20 (motorized)	25 August 1941	—	—
