= Cadets (TV pilot) =

1988 American TV show pilot

- Genre: Sitcom
- Directed by: Zane Buzby
- Starring: Soleil Moon Frye; Richard Roundtree; Barclay DeVey; Jaleel White; William Sadler; Remy Auberjonois; Michael Goldstrom; Corin Nemec; Judd Trichter
- Theme music composer: Jeff Harris
- Composer: Peter Matz
- Country of origin: United States
- Original language: English
- No. of episodes: 1

Production
- Executive producers: Jeff Harris; Arlene Sellers; Alex Winitsky
- Producer: Al Lowenstein
- Production locations: Universal Studios - 100 Universal City Plaza, Universal City, California, USA
- Camera setup: Multi-camera
- Running time: 30 minutes
- Production company: Viacom Enterprises

Original release
- Network: ABC
- Release: September 25, 1988

Cadets is a sitcom pilot, which aired on ABC as a summer special on September 25, 1988. The pilot, however, was not picked up.

== Plot ==
Spunky, immature 13-year-old Tyler McKay has grown up in various public institutions after being abandoned as a small child in the big city. Her guardians decide to enroll her at a very strict, regimental military academy known as Appomattox, which has just begun to accept girls.

== Cast and characters ==
- Soleil Moon Frye as Tyler McKay
- Richard Roundtree as Sergeant Matt Gideon
- Barclay DeVeau as Lucy Lomparski
- Jaleel White as Cadet Nicholls
- William Sadler as Colonel Tom Sturdivant
- Remy Auberjonois as Squad Leader Brigham
- Michael Goldstrom as Anthony Libonati
- Corin Nemec as Cadet Preston Langly
- Judd Trichter as Cadet Goerke
