= You Ruined My Life =

1987 television film

- Genre: Adventure; Biography; Drama
- Written by: Robin Swicord
- Directed by: David Ashwell
- Starring: Soleil Moon Frye; Allen Garfield
- Music by: Jonathan Tunick
- Country of origin: United States
- Original language: English

Production
- Executive producers: Robert Kosberg; Arlene Sellers; Alex Winitsky
- Producers: Mark H. Ovitz; Dylan Sellers
- Production location: Las Vegas
- Cinematography: Ric Waite
- Editors: Barbara Palmer Dixon; Arthur Schmidt
- Running time: 100 min.
- Production companies: Lantana Productions Inc. Mark H. Ovitz Productions; Walt Disney Television

Original release
- Network: ABC
- Release: February 1, 1987

You Ruined My Life is a 1987 television film directed by David Ashwell.

== Plot ==
You Ruined My Life is about 11-year-old Minerva (Soleil Moon Frye), a girl who lives in a Las Vegas casino with her Uncle Howie (Allen Garfield), who spoils her by giving her everything she wants. Minerva gets into trouble and her strict Aunt Hermione (Edith Fields) threatens to take her away. Dexter (Paul Reiser), a clever mathematics professor, finds out a foolproof way to cheat and win in blackjack, but he is caught. Dexter is burdened with a gigantic gambling debt. Uncle Howie makes sure Dexter tutors Minerva so she can gain admissions into a private school. It takes a while for this arrangement to work out between Dexter and Minerva, but finally they make great strides and Minerva amazingly learns everything very quickly. She runs away by herself to take the exam and pass. Meanwhile, Dexter and Uncle Howie's assistant Charlotte (Mimi Rogers) fall in love.
