= Scandalous (film) =

- Directed by: Rob Cohen
- Written by: Larry Cohen; Rob Cohen; John Byrum
- Based on: play by Larry Cohen
- Produced by: Carter DeHaven; Martin C. Schute; Arlene Sellers; Alex Winitsky
- Starring: Robert Hays; John Gielgud; Pamela Stephenson; Jim Dale; M. Emmet Walsh
- Cinematography: Jack Cardiff
- Edited by: Michael Bradsell
- Music by: Dave Grusin
- Distributed by: Orion Pictures
- Release date: 20 January 1984
- Running time: 92 minutes
- Countries: United States; United Kingdom
- Language: English
- Budget: $5 million
- Box office: $526,805

Scandalous is a 1984 British-American comedy film directed by Rob Cohen and starring Robert Hays, John Gielgud and Pamela Stephenson. Cohen said it was the film "where my career will be determined."

== Cast ==
- Robert Hays as Frank Swedlin
- John Gielgud as Uncle Willie
- Pamela Stephenson as Fiona Maxwell Sayle
- M. Emmet Walsh as Simon Reynolds
- Nancy Wood as Lindsay Manning
- Preston Lockwood as Leslie
- Conover Kennard as Francine Swedlin
- Jim Dale as Inspector Anthony Crisp

== Production ==
The film was based on a play by Larry Cohen. He adapted the play into a screenplay and sold it. According to Cohen, "after acquiring the script, the company once again did me the favor of changing everything around and screwing everything up! I thought Scandalous was an utterly dismal movie... If you have an actor as distinguished as John Gielgud in your cast, you should at least give him some material that is worthy of his talent. I don’t think anybody liked that film, including its director."

Cohen says that when he met Stephenson "she was wearing a leather mini-dress, her hair was spiked out two feet above her head, and I had a feeling she could radiate a sense of the outrageous."

=== Filming locations ===
- Polesden Lacey, England, UK
- Great Bookham, England, UK
- Dorking, England, UK
- Surrey, England, UK
- Twickenham Film Studios, St Margarets, Twickenham, England, UK (studio)
- Rainbow Theatre, Finsbury Park, London

== Reception ==
The New York Times called it "a charmless caper movie that seems chiefly a pretext for the characters to keep changing their clothes."
