= Cuba (film) =

1979 film by Richard Lester

- Theatrical release poster, artwork by Ted CoConis
- Directed by: Richard Lester
- Written by: Charles Wood
- Produced by: Arlene Sellers; Alex Winitsky
- Starring: Sean Connery; Brooke Adams; Jack Weston; Hector Elizondo; Denholm Elliott; Martin Balsam; Chris Sarandon; Alejandro Rey; Lonette McKee
- Cinematography: David Watkin
- Edited by: John Victor-Smith
- Music by: Patrick Williams
- Color process: Technicolor
- Production company: Holmby Pictures
- Distributed by: United Artists
- Release date: December 21, 1979
- Running time: 122 minutes
- Country: United States
- Language: English
- Budget: $7 million
- Box office: $5.6 million

Cuba is a 1979 American adventure action film directed by Richard Lester and starring Sean Connery, portraying the build-up to the 1958 Cuban Revolution, filmed in Panavision. (Note: The film's opening scene which shows an airliner landing in Havana with the date "1959"; however, in reality, Batista fled the country on the first day of 1959, so the majority of the film would take place in 1958.) Lester developed the film out of a conversation with a friend, with significant influence from the 1942 film Casablanca.

== Plot ==
In 1959 former British Major and mercenary Robert Dapes (Sean Connery) arrives in Cuba under General Bello's (Martin Balsam) orders as part of the dictator Fulgencio Batista's forces. He is to train the Cuban army to resist Fidel Castro's revolt. Before he even begins his task, he encounters an old flame, Alexandra Lopez de Pulido (Brooke Adams), whom he repeatedly pursues. The plot winds around the tremendous wealth of the Cuban leaders, the mainly American tourists with their seemingly endless money, the poverty-stricken and ex-urban slums where many Cubans live, and the rum and cigar factory owned by Alexandra's selfish husband Juan Pulido (Chris Sarandon) and managed by Alexandra.

When Alexandra's husband takes her out and expects her to drink with a potential (factory) investor and his prostitute, she leaves the restaurant and meets Robert. Furious with her husband, she spends time with Robert, reminiscing about their affair in North Africa (when she was 15 and he was 30). They go to a motel and make love. They care for one another, but Robert will not stay in Cuba.

The following day, the Cuban workers strike, including those in Alexandra's factory. Robert is taken captive by several Cuban rebels, which leads to an attack against a military facility. Robert escapes, and alienated from the corrupt Cuban government that he has come to loathe, aids the rebels in defeating the government troops.

Alexandra watches events pass by, believing life will soon return to normal. Robert begs her to leave, either to be with him or simply to escape Cuba. She refuses. Alex's husband is killed by the same Cuban rebel who stalked Robert throughout the film.

Ultimately, Robert, not seeing Alexandra at the airport, boards the aircraft to escape with other foreigners. Meanwhile, Alexandra is present, outside the fence, weeping as she watches Robert board the aircraft.

Robert and most of the other American, British, and wealthy Cubans flee from Cuba as Fidel comes to power while Alexandra remains behind, alone, to face an unknown future under the new communist government.

== Cast ==
- Sean Connery as Major Robert Dapes
- Brooke Adams as Alexandra Lopez de Pulido
- Jack Weston as Larry Gutman
- Hector Elizondo as Captain Raphael Ramirez
- Denholm Elliott as Donald Skinner
- Martin Balsam as General Bello
- Chris Sarandon as Juan Pulido
- Danny De La Paz as Julio Mederos
- Lonette McKee as Therese Mederos
- Alejandro Rey as Faustino
- Louisa Moritz as Miss Wonderly
- Dave King as Miss Wonderly's Press Agent
- Walter Gotell as Don Jose Pulido
- David Rappaport as Jesus
- Wolfe Morris as General Fulgencio Batista
- Michael Lees as Roger Maxwell-Lafroy
- Tony Mathews as Carrillo
- Roger Lloyd-Pack as Nunez
- Leticia Garrido as Celia
- Maria Charles as Senora Pulido
- Pauline Peart as Dolores
- Anna Nicholas as Maria
- Earl Cameron as Colonel Leyva
- John Morton as Gary
- Anthony Pullen Shaw as Spencer
- Stefan Kalipha as Ramon, Cigar Factory Foreman
- Raul Newney as Painter
- Ram John Holder as Fat Sergeant
- James Turner as Pulido's Chauffeur
- Willis Bouchey as Cavalry Officer on TV (archive footage) (uncredited)
- Ana Obregón as Woman (uncredited)

== Production ==
Cuba was shot in Spain in December 1978. The same historical events were featured five years earlier in Francis Ford Coppola's The Godfather Part II and would be covered again by Sydney Pollack in his 1990 film Havana, starring Robert Redford. Lester's film was perhaps the most stylish of the three, aided by its stirring Spanish locations, "with a marvelous sense of atmosphere".

Diana Ross was offered the female lead but turned it down. Brooke Adams, who had just received acclaim for Days of Heaven, was cast instead.

The aircraft in Cuba are:

- Douglas DC-6B c/n 45077/728, EC-DCK
- Dornier Do 27 c/n 2094, EC-BSX
- North American TB-25N Mitchell s/n 44-29121, N86427
- Douglas C-54A Skymaster c/n 10408, s/n 42-72303, G-APID
- Lockheed C-130H Hercules

== Reception ==
Cuba received mostly negative reviews from major critics, except for the December 18, 1979 review in The Hollywood Reporter that praised the film’s “sense of authenticity of place” and its skillful inter-cutting of newsreel footage. While some critics mentioned the film’s pro-Castro stance, the reviewer explained that “the picture, while taking no position on Cuba today, makes appallingly clear the conditions that made Castro’s revolution inevitable.” Another positive review came from film historian, Leonard Maltin who noted: "Director Lester is in pretty good form with most scenes punctuated by throwaway bits."

The review of Cuba by Vincent Canby in The New York Times was more typical of the critical responses. He wrote "Richard Lester's 'Cuba', which is set in Cuba late in 1958, in the weeks immediately preceding the triumph of Fidel Castro's revolution, is a straight-faced romantic melodrama that's almost as lunatic as Mr. Lester's 'Help!' and 'How I Won the War', both written by Charles Wood, who also wrote the screenplay for the new film. I can't help but suspect that at some point during the production, which was shot in Spain, Mr. Lester and his associates decided that there was absolutely no way to realize the Harold Robbins-like potential of the story and chose, instead, to make a film that is a crazy fantasy about old-time Hollywood melodramas".

On the review aggregator website Rotten Tomatoes, 45% of 11 critics' reviews are positive, with an average rating of 5.5/10. Metacritic, which uses a weighted average, assigned the film a score of 49 out of 100, based on 7 critics, indicating "mixed or average" reviews.

Film critic Leslie Halliwell in Leslie Halliwell's Film Guide (1989) similarly reviewed Cuba, declaring an "aimless romantic melodrama which gets absolutely nowhere and might have been better played in the Casablanca-vein".
