= Albrecht Achilles =

Albrecht Achilles may refer to:

- Albrecht III Achilles, Elector of Brandenburg (1414–1486)
- Albrecht Achilles (Korvettenkapitän) (1914–1943), U-boat commander
