= Silver Bears =

- Official poster
- Directed by: Ivan Passer
- Written by: Paul Erdman; Peter Stone
- Produced by: Arlene Sellers; Alex Winitsky
- Starring: Michael Caine; Cybill Shepherd; Louis Jourdan; Stéphane Audran; David Warner; Tom Smothers; Martin Balsam; Joss Ackland; Charles Gray
- Cinematography: Anthony B. Richmond
- Edited by: Bernard Gribble
- Music by: Claude Bolling
- Production companies: EMI Films; Raleigh Films
- Distributed by: EMI Film Distributors
- Release date: 3 June 1977
- Running time: 113 minutes
- Country: United Kingdom
- Language: English

Silver Bears is a 1977 British comedy crime thriller film based on a novel by Paul Erdman, directed by Ivan Passer and starring Michael Caine, Cybill Shepherd, Louis Jourdan and Joss Ackland. Caine portrays mob accountant "Doc" Fletcher who acquires a Swiss bank and a silver mine but must fight a complex struggle in order to keep hold of them.

== Plot ==
Financial wizard Doc Fletcher goes to Lugano to obtain a bank on behalf of his boss, American mobster Joe Fiore, in order to more easily launder his ill-gotten gains. The impoverished Italian Prince Gianfranco di Siracusa agrees to act as chairman of the board in order to give it an air of respectability. Doc finds that the bank consists of some shabby offices above a pizza restaurant and has only a few hundred dollars in assets.

The Prince suggests that they invest in a silver mine recently discovered in Iran by his distant cousins, Agha Firdausi and his sister Shireen. The mine is said to contain $1 billion worth of untapped silver. After visiting the Firdausis in Iran, Doc obtains $5 million from Agha as security for a loan of $20 million and uses the money to obtain better banking premises and put on a major show that attracts powerful investors.

In London, metals dealer and one of the richest men in the world Charles Cook is concerned by a drop in the price of silver brought about by the Firdausi silver hitting the market. Discovering that the Lugano bank is financing the operation, he decides that the best way to stop the downward plunge is to take over the bank responsible and close down the mine. He contacts Foreman, president of the First National Bank of California, who agrees to the plan and sends one of his accountants, Donald Luckman, to Lugano to meet Doc and his associates. Luckman's questions makes them suspicious. Doc seduces Donald's fun-loving wife Debbie to find out more. She reveals all about Cook's interest in the mine and the bank.

Luckman returns and offers up to $60 million for the bank. Fiore jumps at the opportunity, but Doc does not want to sell and persuades Fiore to give him time to make a bid of his own. Doc meets the Firdausis in Dubai to obtain $60 million to buy the bank, but they reveal there is no silver in the mine, as it has all been smuggled from India. The mine was just a cover to obtain the money needed for their operation.

Foreman buys the bank then goes to Cook and demands an exorbitant amount for the silver mine, only to be told that it does not exist and that he will thus not be refunded the $60 million used to buy the bank. Foreman can recoup the insurance since the purchase report mentions non-existent "oil storage tanks", thus making a case for fraud. Doc offers to give Foreman an additional $10 million which he will get from Cook in exchange for exclusive purchasing rights to the Firdausi silver. Foreman gives Doc the bank. Luckman then reveals that for the insurance claim to be valid there will have to be a criminal prosecution and a scapegoat will be needed in order to go to prison. The others agree, deciding that it should be Luckman, as he falsified the report.

Back in Lugano, the Prince marries Shireen Firdausi. Agha does not attend the wedding and Shireen admits that he was in fact an actor she hired since she doubted if a bank would loan $20 million to a woman. Doc comes across Debbie who has been attending Donald's trial for fraud. She has promised to get a place near the jail in order to be close to him and Doc states that his house is conveniently near the prison itself.

== Cast ==
- Michael Caine as Doc Fletcher
- Cybill Shepherd as Debbie Luckman
- Louis Jourdan as Prince di Siracusa
- Stéphane Audran as Shireen Firdausi
- David Warner as Agha Firdausi
- Tom Smothers as Donald Luckman
- Martin Balsam as Joe Fiore
- Jay Leno as Albert Fiore
- Charles Gray as Sir Charles Cook
- Joss Ackland as Henry Foreman
- Jeremy Clyde as Nick Topping

== Reception ==
Cybil Shepherd wrote the film "suffered the fate of being Columbia’s 'other' movie, released in 1978 at the same time as Close Encounters of the Third Kind. Almost no promotional efforts or finances were put into it, and the film disappeared."

Shepherd enjoyed working with Passer and for a time it seemed he might direct her again from a script by John Cassavetes called Dancing set in Las Vegas about two sailors on leave (to be played by Cassavetes and Peter Falk) who meet two showgirls (played by Shepherd and Raquel Welch) with Peter Bogdanovich to produce. The film was not made.
