= The Willing Flesh =

1955 novel by Willi Heinrich

- Cover from UK paperback
- Author: Willi Heinrich
- Original title: Das Geduldige Fleisch
- Translator: Richard and Clara Winston
- Language: German
- Genre: War novel
- Publisher: Corgi Giant (UK)
- Publication date: 1955
- Publication place: West Germany
- Media type: Print (Hardback and Paperback)
- Pages: 412 (Hardback edition); 368 (Paperback edition)
- OCLC: 753151909

The Willing Flesh (German: Das Geduldige Fleisch, 1955) (English translation published 1956) is a novel by German writer Willi Heinrich, chronicling the Eastern Front combat experiences of a depleted infantry platoon during the 1943 German retreat from the Taman Peninsula in the Caucasian coast of Russia.

In the United States, the novel was published in 1956 by Bobbs-Merrill Company under the title Cross of Iron. The 1977 Hollywood film directed by Sam Peckinpah used this title.

== Historical basis ==
The literary and cinematic "Sergeant Steiner" character may be based upon Johann Schwerdfeger, who soldiered from 1935 to 1937 in Infanterie Regiment 84, and in 1939 was transferred to the Third Company of Infanterie Regiment 186 of the 73rd Infantry Division, at the Polish Campaign's start.

In June 1942, after serving in Jägerersatzbataillon 75, Schwerdfeger joined Jäger Regiment 228 of the 101st Jäger Division, who fought in the Don Bend, at Rostov, and at Maykop, in the Caucasus, and joined the retreat through the Kuban and the Taman Peninsula, the setting of the novel Das Geduldige Fleisch (The Willing Flesh).

On 17 May 1943, Feldwebel Schwerdfeger was awarded the Knight's Cross as a platoon leader in the First Company. In April 1944, in the breakout from Hube's Pocket, he was severely wounded, and was awarded Oak Leaves for his Knight's Cross on 14 May 1944; moreover, Sergeant Schwerdfelger also earned two tank destruction badges.

In two passages of The Willing Flesh (the novel's English edition), Meyer tells Stransky that Steiner saved Lieutenant Colonel Brandt's life; in the original German edition, "Meyer" is named "Schäfer", and "Brandt" is named "Strauss".

From The Willing Flesh (Cross of Iron), in English:

Steiner saved his life once ... It happened at Studenok on the Donets River. Brandt was already the battalion CO then. The Second Company was situated, as far as I know, right on the riverbank. The Russians had succeeded in crossing the river at night. In the battle, the Second Company was almost completely wiped out.

During the war, a similar action occurred to the First Battalion of the 228th Jäger Regiment. Two German military history books about that division chronicle how one of the battalion's companies was surprised and pinned down by two Russian regiments and eleven tanks of the 296 Division, who had crossed the Donets River the night of 19–20 May 1942.

== Characters ==
=== The Platoon ===
- Feldwebel Rolf Steiner
- Unteroffizier Krüger
- Obergefreiter Karl 'Schnurrbart' Reisenauer
- Private Dorn
- Private Hollerbach
- Private Pasternack
- Private Dietz
- Private Kern
- Private Zoll
- Private Maag
- Private Anselm

=== High Command ===
- Lieutenant-Colonel Brandt (regimental commander)
- Captain Stransky (battalion commander)
- Captain Kiesel (regimental adjutant)
- Lieutenant Meyer (company commander)
- Lieutenant Gausser
- Lieutenant Triebig (battalion adjutant)
