= Arlene Sellers =

American film producer (1921–2004)

- Arlene Sellers, from a 1965 newspaper photo
- Born: Arlene Krieger; September 7, 1921; Cleveland, Ohio, U.S.
- Died: March 5, 2004 (aged 82); Los Angeles, California, U.S.
- Education: University of Michigan; UC Berkeley School of Law

Arlene Krieger Sellers (September 7, 1921 – March 5, 2004) was an American real estate developer, lawyer, and film producer.

== Early life and education ==
Arlene Betty Krieger was born in Cleveland, Ohio, the daughter of Morris Krieger and Anna Krieger. She attended the University of Michigan and the UC Berkeley School of Law.

== Career ==
Sellers frequently worked with fellow producer Alex Winitsky. In addition to film projects, they led the development of the Cole Porter Theatre in Los Angeles in the mid-1960s; the project lost funding and was abandoned before 1970.

== Personal life ==
Krieger married Alvin L. Sellers, a physician, in 1942. They had three sons. She died of cancer at age 82.

== Filmography ==
She was a producer in all films unless otherwise noted.

=== Film ===
Year	Film	Credit	Notes
1975	End of the Game		Uncredited
1976	The Seven-Per-Cent Solution	Executive producer	
1977	Cross of Iron		Uncredited
1977	Silver Bears		
1978	House Calls		
1979	The Lady Vanishes	Executive producer	
1979	Cuba		
1983	Blue Skies Again		
1984	Scandalous		
1984	Swing Shift	Executive producer	
1984	Irreconcilable Differences		
1985	Bad Medicine		
1990	Stanley & Iris		
1995	Circle of Friends		Final film as a producer

Miscellaneous crew

Year	Film	Role
1977	Cross of Iron	Presenter
1978	House Calls	Presenter

=== Television ===
Year	Title	Credit	Notes
1987	You Ruined My Life	Executive producer	Television film
1988	Cadets	Executive producer	Television pilot
