= 101st Jäger Division =

German World War II military unit

- German: 101. Jäger-Division
- Active: 1941–1945
- Country: Nazi Germany
- Branch: Army
- Type: Infantry
- Size: Division
- Engagements: World War II: Kamenets-Podolsky pocket

Commanders
- Notable commanders: Erich Marcks

The 101st Jäger Division (German: 101. Jäger-Division) was a light infantry Division of the German Army in World War II. It was formed in July 1942 by the redesignation of the 101st (Light) Infantry Division (101. (leichte) Infanterie-Division), which was itself formed in December 1940. The Walloon Legion was briefly attached to this division from December 1941 to January 1942. The Division took part in the Battle of Kharkov, the Battle of the Caucasus, and the retreat into the Kuban, where it suffered heavy losses fighting both the Red Army and partisans. The division was then involved in the battles in the Kuban bridgehead before being evacuated. The 101st was subsequently transferred to the lower Dnieper River in late 1943. It was part of the 1st Panzer Army that was surrounded in March 1944; it formed the rear guard for the XLVI Panzer Corps during the breakout of the Kamenets-Podolsky pocket. The division then retreated across Ukraine. In October 1944, it was moved to Slovakia and took part in the Battle of the Dukla Pass.

During the last year of the war, it fought in Hungary and Austria; by the end of the war, it had been reduced to the size of a Kampfgruppe.

== Background ==
The division was raised, as the 101st Light Infantry Division (German: 101. Leichte Infanterie-division), on 10 December 1940 near Prague in the German-dominated Protectorate of Bohemia and Moravia. Its home station was initially at Heilbronn and later at Karlsruhe, both in Wehrkreis V, located in the Baden-Württemberg region of Germany. Roughly one-third of the initial strength of the unit was transferred from the 35th Infantry Division, which had participated in the invasion of France and the Low Countries earlier that year, including fighting in Belgium and around Dunkirk. It had then served as part of the occupation forces on the Belgian coast.

The principal fighting units of the four light infantry divisions raised during the 12th "wave" of recruitment for the German Army – one of which was the 101st Light Infantry Division – were two infantry regiments of three battalions each, an artillery regiment consisting of one motorised battery of 15 cm sFH 18 heavy field howitzers and three battalions of 10.5 cm leFH 18 light howitzers, and a reconnaissance battalion consisting of a bicycle company and a horse-mounted cavalry company. What motor vehicles they were issued with had usually been captured. They were equipped as "pursuit" divisions. The division joined General der Infanterie Hans-Wolfgang Reinhard's LI Army Corps once established.

== Operations ==
The division remained with LI Army Corps during the Axis invasion of Yugoslavia in April 1941, attacking from Austria into northern Yugoslavia as part of the 2nd Army. However, only some elements of the division were allocated to LI Army Corps on 5 April – the day before the invasion began – and the rest was not transferred to LI Army Corps control until 10 April, by which time the very limited Yugoslav resistance had been completely broken. With the Yugoslavs defeated, the division was transferred to LII Army Corps, which was part of the 17th Army. After a brief period under LV Army Corps, part of the 6th Army deployed in occupied Poland, the division returned to LII Army Corps in time for the invasion of the Soviet Union in June.

The division was committed to the invasion of the Soviet Union in June 1941, as part of Army Group South. It fought in the Battle of Uman in Ukraine from mid-July to mid-August, during which Army Group South encircled and annihilated the Red Army's 6th and 12th Armies. and was transferred to Army Group South reserve in mid August. It transferred back briefly to LII Army Corps in September, before being re-allocated to LV Army Corps – now with 17th Army – later that month. In early October, the division was briefly transferred XI Army Corps, before being transferred back to LV Army Corps and then to XVII Army Corps by early November. During this period the division fought in the Battle of Kiev and First Battle of Kharkov. In early December, the division was transferred to the reserve of the 17th Army.

The division then fought through the winter battles of 1941–1942. In early January 1942, the division was transferred to LII Army Corps, with which it had begun Operation Barbarossa. At the end of that month, half the division was transferred to the XXXXIV Army Corps, while the remainder stayed with LII Army Corps. In late April, the remainder of the division transferred to the XXXXIV Army Corps. The division fought in the Second Battle of Kharkov in May 1942, and the capture of Rostov in July of that year. It was then committed to the Battle of the Caucasus which raged from July 1942 until the retreat into the Kuban bridgehead in early 1943. In the latter operation, the division suffered heavy losses, both from the Red Army and partisans.

The division was evacuated across the Kerch Strait and transported through Crimea to the lower Dnieper River in the latter part of 1943, where it fought at Nikolajew and Vinniza. In March 1944, the division was surrounded along with the 1st Panzer Army, and formed part of the rearguard when XXXXVI Panzer Corps conducted its successful breakout from encirclement. The division was praised for its conduct during the withdrawal across northern Ukraine, it fought in the Carpathians, and was then withdrawn to the German-aligned Slovak Republic in late 1944.

On 1 January 1945, the 101st Jäger Division (then under Army Group Heinrici of Army Group A) had a strength of 8,510 men. It was deployed south in early in 1945, by which time two of its Jäger battalions were made up of USSR-recruited Osttruppen. The division fought rearguard actions during the withdrawal through Hungary and Austria. Reduced to kampfgruppe strength by the end of the war, it managed to surrender to US forces in the German-annexed Sudetenland.

== Commanders ==
The following officers commanded the division:

- Generalmajor then Generalleutnant Erich Marcks (10 December 1940 - 26 June 1941)
- Generalleutnant Josef Brauner von Haydringen (26 June 1941 - 11 April 1942)
- Oberst then Generalmajor Erich Diestel (11 April 1942 - 1 September 1942)
- Oberst then Generalmajor then Generalleutnant Emil Vogel (1 September 1942 - 12 July 1944)
- Generalleutnant Dr. Walter Assmann (12 July 1944 - 8 May 1945)

== Knight's Cross Recipients ==
Knight's Cross with Oak Leaves
Rank and Name	Unit	Date of Award
Hauptmann der Reserve Josef Kult	Company Commander, 3./Jäger-Rgt. 228	15 Mar 1943
Leutnant Heinrich Ochs	1./Panzerjäger-Abteilung 101	30 Dec 1943
Oberfeldwebel Johann Schwerdfeger	1./Jäger-Rgt. 228	17. Mai 1943
General der Gebirgstruppe Emil Vogel	Division Commander, 101. Jäger-Division	14 May 1944
Oberst Otto Schury	Regimental Commander, Jäger-Rgt. 229	21 Sep 1944

Knight's Cross of the Iron Cross
Rank and Name	Unit	Date of Award
General der Artillerie Erich Marcks	Division Commander, 101. Jäger-Division	28 Jun 1944
General der Infanterie Karl Püchler	Regimental Commander, Jäger-Rgt. 228	20 Dec 1941
Hauptmann der Reserve Josef Kult	Jäger-Rgt. 228	7 Oct 1942
Oberst Karl Busche	Regimental Commander, Jäger-Regiment 228	28 Feb 1943
Major Hüttner	Battalion Commander, III./Jäger-Rgt. 228	15 Mar 1943
Oberfeldwebel Johann Schwerdfeger	Acting Platoon Leader, 1./Jäger-Rgt. 228	17 May 1943
Rittmeister d.Res. Hans-Werner Dreves	Squadron Commander, 3./Aufkl.Abt. 101	2 Jun 1943
Hauptmann d.Res. Georg Schmid	Jäger-Regiment 229	2 Jun 1943
Leutnant Heinrich Ochs	Acting Platoon Leader, 1./Pz.J.Abt. 10	2 Jun 1943
Major Goriany	Battalion Commander, II./Artillerie-Regiment 85	19 Jul 1943
General der Infanterie Vogel	Division Commander, 101. Jäger-Division	7 Aug 1943
Oberleutnant Gailinger	Acting Company Commander, 1./Inf.Btl. 500 z.b.V.	8 Oct 1943
Oberleutnant Künnecke	Company Commander, 2./Inf.Btl. 500 z.b.V.	16 Nov 1943
Oberleutnant Felder	Battery Commander, Artillerie-Regiment 85	23 Feb 1944
Feldwebel Pius Butz	16./Jäger-Regiment 228	6 Mar 1944
Leutnant d.Res. Becker	Acting Company Commander 2./Jäger-Rgt. 228	20 Mar 1944
Oberleutnant d.Res. Ernst Eckert	Company Commander, 11./Jäger-Rgt. 229	9 Jun 1944
Gefreiter Hans Baindner	11./Jäger-Regiment 228	24 Jun 1944
Oberst Bernhard Sieber	Regimental Commander, Jäger-Rgt. 228	24 Jun 1944
Oberstleutnant Emil Liebmann	Acting Regimental Commander, Jäger-Rgt. 228	18 Nov 1944
Major Karl Dixus	Battalion Commander, I./Jäger-Rgt. 229	26 Nov 1944
Generalleutnant Dr. Walter Assmann	Division Commander, 101. Jäger-Division	10 Feb 1945
Oberjäger Springmann	Jäger-Rgt. 228	Apr 1945
Gefreiter Rudler	Jäger-Rgt. 228	Apr 1945
Major Helmut Seeber	Acting Regimental Commander, Jäger-Rgt. 229	Apr 1945
Gefreiter Jakob Kuchar	8./Jäger-Rgt. 228	11 May 1945

== Order of battle ==
The order of battle of the division was as follows:

- 228th Jäger Regiment
- 229th Jäger Regiment
- 85th Artillery Regiment
- 101st Reconnaissance Battalion
- 101st Engineer Battalion
- 101st Panzerjäger (Anti-tank) Battalion
- 101st Signals Battalion
- 101st Field Replacement Battalion
- 101st Divisional Supply Troops
- 101st Pack Mule Battalion

== Notable members ==
- Willi Heinrich, author of The Willing Flesh (1956), which was based on his combat experiences, turned into the movie The Cross of Iron (1977), served in the division's 1st Battalion 228th Jäger Regiment.
