= Cross of Iron =

1977 war film directed by Sam Peckinpah

- British quad format film poster
- Directed by: Sam Peckinpah
- Screenplay by: Julius Epstein; James Hamilton; Walter Kelley
- Based on: The Willing Flesh (1955 novel) by Willi Heinrich
- Produced by: Alex Winitsky; Arlene Sellers; Wolf C. Hartwig
- Starring: James Coburn; Maximilian Schell; James Mason; David Warner; Senta Berger
- Cinematography: John Coquillon
- Edited by: Michael Ellis; Tony Lawson
- Music by: Ernest Gold
- Production companies: Anglo-EMI Productions; Rapid Film; Terra-Filmkunst; ITC Entertainment
- Distributed by: EMI Films (UK); Constantin Film (West Germany)
- Release dates: 28 January 1977 (West Germany); 8 March 1977 (UK)
- Running time: 133 minutes
- Country: United Kingdom; West Germany
- Language: English
- Budget: $6,000,000
- Box office: $1,509,000

Cross of Iron (German: Steiner – Das Eiserne Kreuz, lit. 'Steiner – The Iron Cross') is a 1977 war film directed by Sam Peckinpah, featuring James Coburn, Maximilian Schell, James Mason, and David Warner. Set on the Eastern Front in World War II during the Soviets' Caucasus operations against the German Kuban bridgehead on the Taman Peninsula in late 1943, the film focuses on the class conflict between a newly arrived, aristocratic Prussian officer who covets winning the Iron Cross and a cynical, battle-hardened infantry NCO. The screenplay is based on the semi-autobiographical 1955 novel The Willing Flesh by German author Willi Heinrich.

An international co-production between British and West German companies, the film's exteriors were shot on-location in Yugoslavia. The film was released in West Germany by Constantin Film on January 28, 1977, and in the United Kingdom by EMI Films on March 8. It received a mixed critical reception on initial release, though retrospective reviews have been much more positive, with some critics citing it as one of Peckinpah's best works.

A sequel, Breakthrough, was released in 1979.

== Plot ==
Corporal Rolf Steiner is a veteran soldier of the Wehrmacht on the Eastern Front of World War II. During a raid on an enemy mortar position, his reconnaissance platoon captures a Russian boy soldier. They set off for friendly lines just as Captain Stransky arrives to take command of Steiner's battalion. When the regiment's commander, Colonel Brandt, asks Stransky why he requested transfer to the Kuban bridgehead from more comfortable duties in occupied France, he jokes to Brandt and the regimental adjutant, Captain Kiesel, that he wants to win the Iron Cross.

Stransky meets the patrol's return and orders the prisoner shot. Steiner refuses and the squad hides the boy in their bunker. Stransky promotes Steiner senior sergeant but Steiner is unmoved. Stransky then discerns that his adjutant, Lieutenant Triebig, is a closeted homosexual, a death penalty offence in the German Army.

Steiner's platoon celebrates the birthday of their leader, Lieutenant Meyer. Steiner releases the boy from a forward position just as the expected Russian offensive begins. The boy is killed as they approach. In the pitched battle that follows, Meyer is also killed leading a counter-attack while Stransky is overcome by fear in his bunker. Steiner is wounded and sent to a military hospital.

After his hospital stay, characterised by flashbacks and hallucinations as well as a romantic liaison with a nurse, Steiner refuses home leave to return to his men with Corporal Schnurrbart. Stransky's nomination for an Iron Cross requires Steiner's corroboration, but despite promises of preferential treatment by Stransky, Steiner tells Brandt he hates all officers, even "enlightened" ones like Brandt and Kiesel, and requests time to consider his answer.

When the battalion is ordered to retreat, Stransky doesn't notify Steiner's platoon, who are forced to retreat through enemy-held territory. They capture a detachment of female soldiers. While Steiner plans their next move, Zoll tries to abuse one of the women and is painfully wounded; he kills her in response. Dietz is deceived and killed by one of the prisoners. Steiner locks Zoll up with the vengeful Russian women, leaving them behind but taking their uniforms as disguises.

They approach the front line and radio their positions to avoid friendly fire. Stransky implies to Triebig that if Steiner was killed by mistake, he could be transferred to France. Triebig orders his men to open fire as Steiner cross no man's land killing several including Schnurrbart before the machine gunners realize their mistake. Steiner kills Triebeg, leaving Krüger in command, and sets out to find Stransky whose transfer to France has come through.

The Soviets launch a major assault as the Germans continue their retreat toward the Crimea. Brandt orders Kiesel to evacuate, Brandt then rallies fleeing troops for a counterattack. Steiner locates Stransky, but instead of killing him, he hands him a weapon, and offers to show him "where the Iron Crosses grow". Stransky accepts Steiner's challenge. The film closes with Stransky unable to reload his MP40, while being shot at by an adolescent Russian soldier who resembles the boy soldier released by Steiner. When Stransky asks Steiner for help, Steiner begins to laugh. His laughter continues through the credits, which feature "Hänschen klein" again and segues to black-and-white images of civilian victims from World War II and later conflicts.

== Cast ==
- James Coburn as Feldwebel Rolf Steiner
- Maximilian Schell as Hauptmann Stransky
- James Mason as Oberst Brandt
- David Warner as Hauptmann Kiesel
- Klaus Löwitsch as Unteroffizier Krüger
- Vadim Glowna as Schütze Kern
- Roger Fritz as Leutnant Triebig
- Dieter Schidor as Gefreiter Anselm
- Burkhard Driest as Oberschütze Maag
- Fred Stillkrauth as Obergefreiter Karl "Schnurrbart" Reisenauer
- Michael Nowka as Schütze Dietz
- Véronique Vendell as Marga
- Arthur Brauss as Schütze Zoll
- Senta Berger as Eva
- Igor Galo as Leutnant Meyer
- Slavko Štimac as Russian Boy
- Demeter Bitenc as Hauptmann Pucher
- Vladan Živković as Gefreiter Wolf
- Bata Kameni as Gefreiter Joseph Keppler
- Hermina Pipinić as Soviet Major

== Production ==
=== Pre-production ===
Cross of Iron was a joint Anglo-German production between EMI Films and ITC Entertainment of London and Rapid Films GmbH from Munich. Although the West German producer, Wolf C. Hartwig had secured a budget of $4 million, only a fraction of it was available as pre-production started. This created delays on location because local services and film crews demanded payment before commencing work.

In July 1975 EMI Films announced the film would be made as part of a slate of eleven films worth £6 million. The title was then Sergeant Steiner and the film would star Robert Shaw.

=== Writing ===
Screenplay credits are given to Julius Epstein, James Hamilton and Walter Kelley. Their source material was the 1956 novel The Willing Flesh by Willi Heinrich, a fictional work that was loosely based on the true story of Johann Schwerdfeger (1914-2015). The real-life Wehrmacht NCO was a highly decorated combat veteran who fought through both the Battle of the Caucasus and Kuban pocket.

=== Filming ===
Filming, which began on March 29, 1976, was shot on location at Trieste in Italy and Yugoslavia. Scenes were filmed around Obrov in Slovenia, and Zagreb and Savudrija in Croatia. Interiors were completed at Pinewood Studios in England.

The film is noted for featuring historically accurate weaponry and equipment such as Soviet T-34/85 tanks (which were obtained from the arsenal of the Yugoslav People's Army), Russian PPSh-41s and German MG 42s and MP40s. According to star James Coburn, the Yugoslav government had promised that all the military equipment would be ready for the start of filming, but Hartwig's lack of budget meant that considerable delays occurred when half the equipment was missing just as the production was about to begin.

Peckinpah's alcoholism was also affecting the filming schedule because every day he was consuming 180° proof Slivovitz (Šljivovica). However every two to three weeks Peckinpah would go on a binge resulting in lost shooting days while he was allowed to regain his cognitive abilities.

Due to the various productions delays, the film had cost overruns of £2 million. With no more money, Hartwig and his co-producer Alex Winitsky tried to halt the production on July 6, 1976 (the 89th day of shooting) before the final scene had been filmed. The original ending was expected to take three days to film in an abandoned rail yard and special effects teams had already spent several days wiring pyrotechnics for the shoot. However, with the costs now at $6 million there was no more money. Coburn was so annoyed at this, he had Hartwig and Winitsky thrown off the set before making Peckinpah film a quick improvised ending for the film.

=== Post-production ===
Peckinpah spent five weeks going through the rushes to create a final cut. Working continuously four to five hours a day overseeing the editing, he started snorting cocaine along with his drinking. He relied heavily on his experience with his 1969 Western The Wild Bunch to create the film's pace (the slow motion during violent scenes) and its visual style.

With its mix of American, British, and German actors (plus Yugoslavian extras), the film was shot originally in English, with a separate German dub later produced.

== Reception ==
=== Box office ===
At the time of its release, the film performed poorly at the box office in the US and received mixed reviews. Its bleak, anti-war tone was unable to get noticed amidst the excitement surrounding the box-office hit Star Wars, released the same year. However, it performed very well in West Germany, with the best box-office earnings of any film released there since The Sound of Music, and audiences and critics across Europe responded well to the film.

=== Critical response ===
Vincent Canby of The New York Times called it "Mr. Peckinpah's least interesting, least personal film in years ... I can't believe that the director ever had his heart in this project, which, from the beginning, looks to have been prepared for the benefit of the people who set off explosives. However, the battle footage is so peculiarly cut into the narrative that you often don't know who is doing what to whom." Variety stated, "Cross of Iron is Sam Peckinpah's idea of an antiwar tract but which more than anything else affirms the director's prowess as an action filmmaker of graphic mayhem ... the Wolf C. Hartwig production is well but conventionally cast, technically impressive, but ultimately violence-fixated to its putative philosophic cost." Gene Siskel of the Chicago Tribune gave the film 0.5 stars out of 4 and wrote, "There are plenty of questions to be asked about Cross of Iron, Sam Peckinpah's latest bloodbath picture. Questions such as, 'Why was this film made?'" Kevin Thomas of the Los Angeles Times wrote, "Everything Peckinpah and his writers have to say about war in Cross of Iron has been better expressed by others and Peckinpah himself. Since Cross of Iron is too familiar to engage us intellectually, it becomes a wearying, numbing spectacle of carnage that tends to inure us to the violence it so graphically depicts." Gary Arnold of The Washington Post called it "a peculiarly pointless, expendable new action film," adding, "If Peckinpah had something specific in mind when he began this project, an international co-production shot in Yugoslavia, he has lost the train of thought somewhere along the line." In the opinion of Filmcritic.com, "Peckinpah indulges in endless combat scenes (this was his only war movie), which try the patience of viewers who came for the real story."

Fans of the film include Quentin Tarantino, who used it as inspiration for Inglourious Basterds. Orson Welles, when he saw the film, cabled Peckinpah, praising the latter's film as "the best war film he had seen about the ordinary enlisted man since All Quiet on the Western Front." Iain Johnstone, reviewing the film's release on Blu-ray in June 2011, praised the film, saying "Cross of Iron bears all the hallmarks of a real classic, which ranks with Peckinpah's finest work. As a poignant reminder of the sheer brutal obscenity of war, it has rarely been equalled." Mike Mayo wrote in his book War Movies: Classic Conflict on Film that Cross of Iron, Sam Peckinpah's only war film, "is a forgotten masterpiece that has never really managed to overcome its troubled and expensive production." Jay Hyams wrote in War Movies that while Peckinpah had directed "many films about battles between groups of armed men...this was the first in which both sides wear uniforms." Coburn said the film was one of his favorites of those he had been in. (The movie is generally considered one of the best of Coburn's later movies.)

On the review aggregator website Rotten Tomatoes, 71% of 21 critics' reviews are positive, with an average rating of 6.7/10. Metacritic, which uses a weighted average, assigned the film a score of 64 out of 100, based on 9 critics, indicating "generally favorable" reviews.

== Sequel ==
The film Breakthrough, which was mostly financed by West German producers, was released in 1979. It was made by American director Andrew McLaglen who, like Peckinpah, was known for Westerns. Several changes were made to the sequel. For instance, the action was moved from Russia to the Western Front and Richard Burton replaced Coburn as Sgt Steiner. The film involved Steiner saving the life of an American officer (Robert Mitchum) and a conspiracy to assassinate Adolf Hitler.

Breakthrough was panned by critics, who criticised it for a confusing plot, poor dialogue, aged cast, and undistinguished acting.

== Re-release ==
To coincide with its release on Blu-ray, a new print of Cross of Iron was screened at selected cinemas in Britain in June 2011.
