= Emil Vogel =

WW2 German Army general (1894-1985)

Emil Wilhelm Vogel
- Born: 20 July 1894
- Died: 1 October 1985 (aged 91)
- Military career
- Allegiance: German Empire; Weimar Republic; Nazi Germany
- Branch: German Army
- Service years: 1914–1945
- Rank: General der Gebirgstruppe
- Commands: 101st Jäger Division; XXXVI Mountain Corps
- Conflicts: World War I; World War II; Annexation of Austria; Annexation of the Sudetenland; Invasion of Poland; Battle of France; Operation Barbarossa; Battle of Smolensk (1941); Battle of Moscow; Battle of the Caucasus; Hube's Pocket; Petsamo–Kirkenes Offensive; Operation Nordlicht; Lapland War
- Awards: Knight's Cross of the Iron Cross with Oak Leaves

Emil Wilhelm Vogel (20 July 1894 – 1 October 1985) was a German general during World War II who commanded the XXXVI Mountain Corps. He was a recipient of the Knight's Cross of the Iron Cross with Oak Leaves.

== Life and career ==
Emil Vogel was born in Zwickau in Saxony on 20 July 1894. In August 1914 he entered the German Army as an ensign, and was later commissioned lieutenant in a Bavarian pioneer battalion, serving in World War I. He rejoined the army after the war, becoming a general staff officer.

At the outbreak of World War II in 1939, Vogel was chief of staff of VII Corps, then of XX Corps, receiving the German Cross in Gold in April 1942. In September 1942 he took command of the 101st Jäger-Division, serving in the southern sector of the Eastern Front. While with the division he was awarded the Knight's Cross of the Iron Cross in August 1943 for service in the Kuban bridgehead, and the Oak Leaves to the Knight's Cross in May 1944 for his part in the defence of the Kamenets-Podolsky pocket. From August 1944 he took command of XXXVI Mountain Corps serving in Finland and northern Norway, where he surrendered with his unit in May 1945.

Vogel ended the war with the rank of General of Mountain Troops (General der Gebirgstruppe).

== Awards and decorations ==
- Iron Cross (1914) 2nd Class (11 June 1915) & 1st Class (25 October 1916).
- Clasp to the Iron Cross (1939) 2nd Class (25 September 1939) & 1st Class (20 October 1939).
- German Cross in Gold on 25 April 1942 as Oberst im Generalstab (colonel in the General Staff) of the General-Kommando of the XX. Armeekorps.
- Knight's Cross of the Iron Cross:
  - Knight's Cross on 7 August 1943 as Generalleutnant and commander of 101st Jäger Division.
  - Oak Leaves on 14 May 1944 as Generalleutnant and commander of 101st Jäger Division.

Military offices
Preceded by Generalleutnant Erich Diestel	Commander of 101. Jäger-Division; 1 September 1942 - 12 July 1944	Succeeded by Generalleutnant Dr. Walter Aßmann
Preceded by General der Infanterie Karl Weisenberger	Commander of XXXVI. Gebirgskorps; 10 August 1944 - 8 May 1945	Succeeded by -
