= Willi Heinrich =

German writer

- Born: 1920; Heidelberg, Weimar Republic
- Died: 2005 (aged 84–85); Dobel, Germany
- Occupations: Soldier; writer
- Military career
- Allegiance: Nazi Germany
- Branch: German Army
- Service years: 1938–1945
- Unit: 101st Jäger Division
- Conflicts: Second World War; Occupation of Czechoslovakia; Eastern Front

Signature
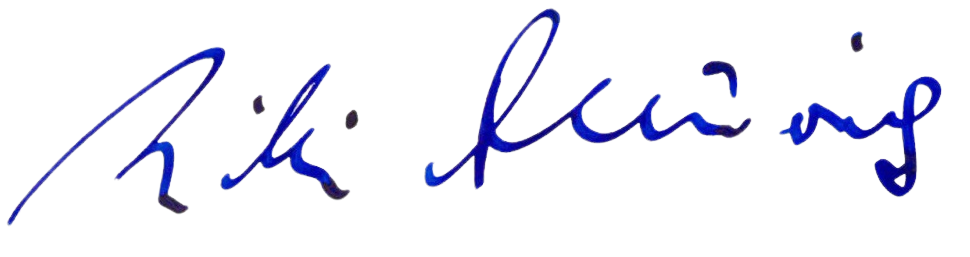

Willi Heinrich (9 August 1920 – 2005) was a German author and soldier. During the Second World War he fought in the 101st Jäger Division, which suffered massive losses on the Eastern Front, and his combat experiences inspired his first successful novel, Das geduldige Fleisch (1955), published in English translation as The Willing Flesh in the United Kingdom and as The Cross of Iron in the United States (1956). He later wrote a series of popular genre novels in the 1970s and 1980s.

== Biography ==
Willi Heinrich was born in Heidelberg, Baden-Württemberg on 9 August 1920. After schooling in Karlsruhe he was drafted into the German Army, and served from 1938 till 1945. His first combat experience was in Czechoslovakia, but he was later moved to the Eastern Front. He served with the 1st Battalion 228th Jäger Regiment of the 101st Jäger Division. Over the course of the war, the 101st Jäger Division suffered seven hundred percent casualties – Heinrich himself was wounded five times.

After the war, Heinrich became a writer; his first novel In einem Schloss zu wohnen, written 1950–1952, went unpublished until 1976, when he was an established novelist. His first commercial novel, Das geduldige Fleisch was published in 1955. The novel is set on the Eastern Front and centres around the conflicts within Heinrich's former unit. An immediate success, the novel was translated to English and published as The Willing Flesh (1956), by Weidenfeld & Nicolson in the United Kingdom, and as Cross of Iron (1957) by Bobbs-Merrill in the United States. In 1977, Sam Peckinpah adapted it as the film Cross of Iron, featuring James Coburn as the protagonist anti-hero Rolf Steiner.

Though he began as a war genre novelist, Heinrich concentrated in the pulp fiction genre of soapy, sexy stories that were very popular in the 1970s and 1980s. Most of his books are novels, but Erzählungen (1985) is an anthology comprising three novellas: Die Freundinnen, Fata Morgana, and Harte Bandagen. He retired in 1994, shortly after publishing Der Gesang Der Sirenen (The Singing of the Sirens).

Willi Heinrich died in Dobel, near Karlsruhe, in 2005, aged 84.

== Bibliography ==
The Willing Flesh (1956)

- Das geduldige Fleisch (1955 – English editions: The Willing Flesh UK, 1956, and Cross Of Iron US, 1956)
- Der Goldene Tisch (1956 – English editions: The Savage Mountain UK, 1957, and Crack of Doom US, 1958)
- Die Gezeichneten (1958 – English edition: The Mark Of Shame, 1958)
- Alte Häuser sterben nicht (1960 – English edition: The Crumbling Fortress, 1963)
- Gottes zweite Garnitur (1962 – English edition: The Lonely Conqueror)
- Ferien im Jenseits (1964 – English edition: The Devil's Bed)
- Maiglöckchen oder ähnlich (1965)
- Mittlere Reife (1966)
- Geometrie einer Ehe (1967)
- Schmetterlinge weinen nicht (1967)
- In Stolzer Trauer (1970)
- Jahre wie Tau (1971)
- So long, Archie (1972)
- Liebe und was sonst noch zählt (1974 – English edition: Rape Of Honour, 1974)
- Ein Handvoll Himmel (1976)
- In einem Schloß zu wohnen (1976)
- Ein Mann ist immer unterwegs (1978)
- Herzbube & Mädchen (1980)
- Allein gegen Palermo (1981)
- Vermögen vorhanden (1982)
- Traumvogel (1983)
- Männer zum Wegwerfen (1985)
- Erzählungen (1985, anthology of three novellas: "Fata Morgana", "Die Freundinnen", "Harte Bandagen")
- Die Verführung (1986)
- Zeit der Nymphen (1987)
- Der Väter Ruhm (1988)
- Der Reisende der Nacht (1989)
- Eine spanische Affäre (1990)
- Ein Herz für Frauen (1992)
- Puppenspiele (1993)
- Der Gesang der Sirenen (1994)

== Film adaptations ==
- Gottes zweite Garnitur, directed by Paul Verhoeven (1967, TV film)
- Schmetterlinge weinen nicht, directed by Klaus Überall (1970)
- Cross of Iron, directed by Sam Peckinpah (1977)
