= Adolf Abel =

German architect (1882–1968)

Personal information
- Full name: Adolphe Gaston Abel
- Nationality: German
- Born: 27 November 1882 Paris, French Republic
- Died: 3 November 1968 (aged 85) Bruckberg, West Germany

Sport
- Sport: Arts
- Event: Architecture

Adolphe "Adolf" Gaston Abel (27 November 1882 – 3 November 1968) was a German architect. He competed in the 1928 Summer Olympics.

Over the years, Abel earned his PhD at the Technical University of Munich, taught at the University of Stuttgart and the Technische Universität Darmstadt, and was the Director of Town Planning in Cologne. He also designed the RheinEnergieStadion and Mülheim Bridge, as well as buildings at the Koelnmesse and Cologne University.
