= Fritz Albrecht =

Nazi officer (1905–1977)

- Born: 23 December 1905
- Died: 29 April 1977 (aged 71)
- Military career
- Allegiance: Nazi Germany; West Germany
- Branch: Army
- Rank: Oberst (Wehrmacht); Brigadegeneral (Bundeswehr)
- Conflicts: World War II
- Awards: Knight's Cross of the Iron Cross

Fritz Albrecht (23 December 1905 – 29 April 1977) was a German officer in the Wehrmacht of Nazi Germany during World War II and a Brigadegeneral in the Bundeswehr of West Germany. He was a recipient of the Knight's Cross of the Iron Cross.

== Awards and decorations ==
- Iron Cross (1939) 2nd Class (7 October 1939) & 1st Class (29 May 1940)
- Honour Roll Clasp of the Army (17 February 1944)
- German Cross in Gold on 14 January 1942 as Major in Artillerie-Regiment 13
- Knight's Cross of the Iron Cross on 19 April 1945 as Oberst and commander of Kampfgruppe Magdeburg
