= Ernst Andres =

Nazi captain (1921–1945)

- Born: 19 September 1921; Pfullingen
- Died: 11 February 1945 (aged 23); Oelde
- Military career
- Allegiance: Nazi Germany
- Branch: Luftwaffe
- Service years: 1939–45
- Rank: Hauptmann
- Units: KG 2 NJG 4
- Conflicts: World War II: Defence of the Reich
- Awards: Knight's Cross of the Iron Cross

Ernst Andres (19 September 1921 – 11 February 1945) was a highly decorated Hauptmann in the Luftwaffe during World War II, and a recipient of the Knight's Cross of the Iron Cross. The Knight's Cross of the Iron Cross, and its variants were the highest awards in the military and paramilitary forces of Nazi Germany during World War II.

During the night of 4 May 1943 to 5 May Angriffsführer England ordered a consolidated attack on Norwich. Involved were 43 aircraft from Kampfgeschwader 2 (KG 2) under the command of KG 2's Geschwaderkommodore Walter Bradel, which took off from the airport of Soesterberg. The attack force was augmented by aircraft from II./Kampfgeschwader 40 and 36 Ju 88 from Kampfgeschwader 6. Bradel, who flying as an observer on a Do 217K piloted by Andres, was attacked by a British nightfighter, and suffered engine damage. Andres attempted an emergency landing near Landsmeer, Amsterdam. The aircraft was 80% damaged and Bradel and the aerial gunner Flieger Werner Becker were killed.

== Awards and decorations ==
- Flugzeugführerabzeichen
- Front Flying Clasp of the Luftwaffe in Gold
- Iron Cross (1939)
  - 2nd Class
  - 1st Class
- Wound Badge (1939)
  - in Black
- German Cross in Gold on 3 December 1942 as Leutnant in the II./Kampfgeschwader 2
- Knight's Cross of the Iron Cross on 20 April 1944 as Hauptmann and pilot in the Stabsstaffel/Kampfgeschwader 2
