= Walter Assmann =

German general (1896–1964)

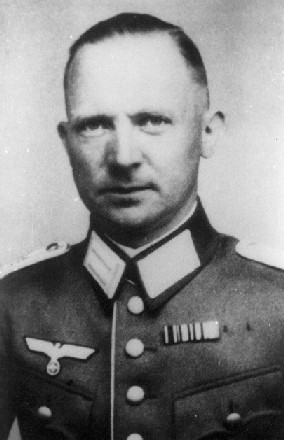
- Assmann, c. 1944
- Born: 22 July 1896; Mühlhausen, German Empire
- Died: 1 May 1964 (aged 67); Offenbach am Main, Hesse, West Germany
- Military career
- Allegiance: German Empire; Weimar Republic; Nazi Germany
- Branch: Imperial German Army; Reichswehr; German Army (Wehrmacht)
- Service years: 1914–1920; 1934–1945
- Rank: Leutnant; Generalleutnant
- Commands: 101st Jäger Division
- Conflicts: World War I World War II
- Awards: Knight's Cross of the Iron Cross; German Cross in gold

Walter Karl Friedrich Assmann (22 July 1896 – 1 May 1964) was a German general in the Wehrmacht of Nazi Germany during World War II who commanded the 101st Jäger Division. He was a recipient of the Knight's Cross of the Iron Cross.

Assmann was born in Mühlhausen in 1896. He entered the Imperial German Army in August 1914 at the outbreak of World War I. By the end of the war, he was a Leutnant and the adjutant of the 102nd Reserve Infantry Brigade. With the reduction in Germany's Reichswehr mandated by the Treaty of Versailles, he left military service in 1920 and returned to civilian life.

At the time of German rearmament, Assmann returned to active duty with the army in October 1934. He served as a company commander with infantry regiments from 1935 to 1939. In World War II, he was a battalion commander when he was severely wounded in the Battle of France. He was hospitalized from June to December of 1940, and then returned to lead his battalion. He then advanced to regimental commands, leading the 479th and 478th infantry regiments between October 1941 and November 1943. Placed in the Führerreserve for eight months, Assmann returned to field command with the 101st Jäger Division in July 1944. He was promoted to Generalleutnant on 16 March 1945, and continued to lead his division until Germany's surrender in May 1945.

== Awards and decorations ==
- Iron Cross (1914)
  - 2nd Class (28 August 1915)
  - 1st Class (16 October 1916)
- Hanseatic Cross of Hamburg (28 May 1918)
- Hessian Bravery Decoration (25 May 1917)
- Wound Badge (1914) in black
- Honour Cross of the World War 1914/1918 (12 February 1935)
- Iron Cross (1939)
  - 2nd Class (29 June 1940)
  - 1st Class (15 July 1941)
- Wound Badge (1939) in black
- German Cross in Gold on 25 April 1942 as Oberstleutnant in Infanterie-Regiment 478
- Knight's Cross of the Iron Cross on 10 February 1945 as Generalmajor and commander of 101. Jäger-Division

Military offices
Preceded by General der Gebirgstruppe Emil Vogel	Commander of 101. Jäger-Division; 12 July 1944 – 8 May 1945	Succeeded by none
