= Alex Winitsky =

American film producer (1924–2019)

- Born: 27 December 1924
- Died: 14 November 2019 (aged 94)
- Education: New York University; Loyola Law School
- Occupations: Real estate developer, film producer
- Spouses: Lois Lennartson, Ann Lambert
- Children: 3

Alex Winitsky (December 27, 1924 – November 14, 2019) was an American real estate developer and film producer. He frequently worked with fellow producer Arlene Sellers.
