= List of Knight's Cross of the Iron Cross recipients =

The Knight's Cross of the Iron Cross (German: Ritterkreuz des Eisernen Kreuzes) and its variants were the highest awards in the military of the Third Reich. Recipients are grouped by grades of the Knight's Cross. Within each grade the recipients are ordered chronologically. An exception is the lowest grade, here the recipients are ordered alphabetically by last name. The rank listed is the recipient's rank at the time the Knight's Cross was awarded. Broken out into sub lists are the recipients of the Knight's Cross with Oak Leaves, one list for every year between 1940 and 1945 the award was presented. Also listed separately are the alphabetical lists of the Knight's Cross of the Iron Cross recipients. The foreign recipients of the Knight's Cross and the foreign recipients of the Knight's Cross with Oak Leaves are listed separately as well.

The last legal presentation of the Knight's Cross, in any of its grades, had to be made before 23:01 Central European Time 8 May 1945, the time when the German surrender became effective. A number of presentations were made after this date, the last on 17 June 1945. These late presentations are considered de facto but not de jure awards. In 1986, the Association of Knight's Cross Recipients (AKCR) acknowledged 7,321 presentations made to the members of the three military branches of the Wehrmacht—the Heer (Army), Kriegsmarine (Navy) and Luftwaffe (Air Force)—as well as the Waffen-SS, the Reichsarbeitsdienst (RAD—Reich Labour Service) and the Volkssturm (German national militia). There were also 43 recipients in the military forces of allies of the Third Reich for a total of 7,364 recipients. Analysis of the German Federal Archives revealed evidence for 7,161 officially—de facto and de jure—bestowed recipients, including one additional presentation previously unidentified by the AKCR. The AKCR names 890 recipients of the Oak Leaves to the Knight's Cross, including the eight recipients who served in the military forces of allies of the Third Reich. The German Federal Archives do not substantiate 27 of these Oak Leaves recipients. The Swords to the Knight's Cross were awarded 160 times according to the AKCR, among them the posthumous presentation to the Japanese Admiral Isoroku Yamamoto, 13 of which cannot be supported by the German Federal Archives. The Diamonds to the Knight's Cross were awarded 27 times, all of which are verifiable in the German Federal Archives. The final grade, the Golden Oak Leaves to the Knight's Cross was verifiably awarded once to Hans-Ulrich Rudel on 29 December 1944.

This along with the + (plus) indicates that a higher grade of Knight's Cross was awarded as well.
This along with the * (asterisk), indicates that the Knight's Cross was awarded posthumously.
This along with the ? (question mark) indicates that author Veit Scherzer has expressed doubt regarding the veracity and formal correctness of the listing.

== Background ==
The Knight's Cross of the Iron Cross and its higher grades were based on four separate enactments. The first enactment, Reichsgesetzblatt I S. 1573 of 1 September 1939 instituted the Iron Cross (Eisernes Kreuz), the Knight's Cross of the Iron Cross and the Grand Cross of the Iron Cross (Großkreuz des Eisernen Kreuzes). Article 2 of the enactment mandated that the award of a higher class be preceded by the award of all preceding classes. As the war progressed, some of the recipients of the Knight's Cross distinguished themselves further and a higher grade, the Oak Leaves to the Knight's Cross of the Iron Cross, was instituted. The Oak Leaves, as they were commonly referred to, were based on the enactment Reichsgesetzblatt I S. 849 of 3 June 1940. In 1941, two higher grades of the Knight's Cross were instituted. The enactment Reichsgesetzblatt I S. 613 of 28 September 1941 introduced the Knight's Cross of the Iron Cross with Oak Leaves and Swords (Ritterkreuz des Eisernen Kreuzes mit Eichenlaub und Schwertern) and the Knight's Cross of the Iron Cross with Oak Leaves, Swords and Diamonds (Ritterkreuz des Eisernen Kreuzes mit Eichenlaub, Schwertern und Brillanten). At the end of 1944 the final grade, the Knight's Cross of the Iron Cross with Golden Oak Leaves, Swords, and Diamonds (Ritterkreuz des Eisernen Kreuzes mit goldenem Eichenlaub, Schwertern und Brillanten), based on the enactment Reichsgesetzblatt 1945 I S. 11 of 29 December 1944, became the final variant of the Knight's Cross authorized.

== Grand Cross of the Iron Cross ==
The Grand Cross of the Iron Cross is based on the enactment Reichsgesetzblatt I S. 1573 of 1 September 1939 Verordnung über die Erneuerung des Eisernen Kreuzes (Regulation of the renewing of the Iron Cross). This grade was awarded only once. The sole recipient was Generalfeldmarschall Hermann Göring, who at the same time was promoted to Reichsmarschall.

Number	Name	Service	Rank	Role and unit	Date of award	Notes
1	Hermann Göring	Luftwaffe	Generalfeldmarschall	Reich Minister of Aviation and Commander-in-chief of the Luftwaffe	19 July 1940	at the same time promoted to Reichsmarschall

== Knight's Cross with Golden Oak Leaves, Swords and Diamonds ==
The "Knight's Cross with Golden Oak Leaves, Swords and Diamonds" is based on the enactment Reichsgesetzblatt 1945 I S. 11 of 29 December 1944. This grade of the award was to be awarded twelve times only. The sole recipient was Oberstleutnant Hans-Ulrich Rudel.

Number	Name	Service	Rank	Role and unit	Date of award	Notes
1	Hans-Ulrich Rudel	Luftwaffe	Oberstleutnant	Geschwaderkommodore of Schlachtgeschwader 2 "Immelmann"	29 December 1944	at the same time promoted to Oberst

== Knight's Cross with Oak Leaves, Swords and Diamonds ==
The "Knight's Cross with Oak Leaves, Swords and Diamonds" is based on the enactment Reichsgesetzblatt I S. 613 of 28 September 1941 to reward those servicemen who had already been awarded the Oak Leaves with Swords to the Knight's Cross of the Iron Cross. Ultimately, it would be awarded to only twenty-seven German soldiers, sailors and airmen, ranging from young fighter pilots to field marshals.

Number	Name	Service	Rank	Role and unit	Date of award	Notes
1	Werner Mölders	Luftwaffe	Oberst	Geschwaderkommodore of Jagdgeschwader 51	15 July 1941 (Note: According to Scherzer on 16 July 1941.)	Killed in plane crash 22 November 1941
2	Adolf Galland	Luftwaffe	Oberst	Geschwaderkommodore of Jagdgeschwader 26 "Schlageter"	28 January 1942	—
3	Gordon Gollob	Luftwaffe	Major	Geschwaderkommodore of Jagdgeschwader 77	29 August 1942	—
4	Hans-Joachim Marseille	Luftwaffe	Oberleutnant	Staffelkapitän of the 3./Jagdgeschwader 27	3 September 1942	KIA 30 September 1942
5	Hermann Graf	Luftwaffe	Oberleutnant of the Reserves	Staffelkapitän of the 9./Jagdgeschwader 52	16 September 1942	—
6	Erwin Rommel	Heer	Generalfeldmarschall	Commander-in-chief of Heeresgruppe Afrika	11 March 1943	Committed suicide 14 October 1944
7	Wolfgang Lüth	Kriegsmarine	Fregattenkapitän	Commander of U-181	9 August 1943	Killed 14 May 1945
8	Walter Nowotny	Luftwaffe	Hauptmann	Gruppenkommandeur of the I./Jagdgeschwader 54	19 October 1943	KIA 8 November 1944
9	Adelbert Schulz	Heer	Oberst	Commander of Panzer-Regiment 25	14 December 1943	KIA 28 January 1944
10	Hans-Ulrich Rudel+	Luftwaffe	Major	Gruppenkommandeur of the III./Schlachtgeschwader 2 "Immelmann"	29 March 1944	Awarded 1st (and only) Golden Oak Leaves 29 December 1944
11	Hyazinth Graf Strachwitz von Gross-Zauche und Camminetz	Heer	Oberst	Commander of a Panzer Group in the Heeresgruppe Nord	15 April 1944	Promoted to Generalmajor with the Diamonds
12	Herbert Otto Gille	Waffen-SS	SS-Gruppenführer and Generalleutnant of the Waffen-SS	Commander of 5. SS-Panzergrenadier-Division "Wiking"	19 April 1944	—
13	Hans Hube	Heer	General der Panzertruppe	Commander of 1. Panzerarmee	20 April 1944	Promoted to Generaloberst with the Diamonds, killed in a plane crash 21 April 1944
14	Albert Kesselring	Luftwaffe	Generalfeldmarschall	OB Süd (Heeresgruppe C)	19 July 1944	—
15	Helmut Lent	Luftwaffe	Oberstleutnant	Geschwaderkommodore of Nachtjagdgeschwader 3	31 July 1944	KIA 7 October 1944
16	Josef Dietrich	Waffen-SS	SS-Oberstgruppenführer and Generaloberst of the Waffen-SS	Commanding general of I. SS-Panzerkorps "Leibstandarte SS Adolf Hitler" (Note: According to Scherzer as commanding general of the I. SS-Panzerkorps.)	6 August 1944	—
17	Walter Model	Heer	Generalfeldmarschall	Commander in chief of Heeresgruppe Mitte	17 August 1944	Committed suicide 21 April 1945
18	Erich Hartmann	Luftwaffe	Oberleutnant	Staffelkapitän of the 9./Jagdgeschwader 52	25 August 1944	—
19	Hermann Balck	Heer	General der Panzertruppe	Acting commander of 4. Panzerarmee	31 August 1944	—
20	Hermann-Bernhard Ramcke	Luftwaffe	Generalleutnant	Commander of Fortress Brest	19 September 1944	Awarded the Swords simultaneously with the Diamonds.
21	Heinz-Wolfgang Schnaufer	Luftwaffe	Hauptmann	Gruppenkommandeur of the IV./Nachtjagdgeschwader 1	16 October 1944	—
22	Albrecht Brandi	Kriegsmarine	Fregattenkapitän	Commander of U-967	24 November 1944	—
23	Ferdinand Schörner	Heer	Generaloberst	Commander-in-chief of Heeresgruppe Nord	1 January 1945	—
24	Hasso-Eccard von Manteuffel	Heer	General der Panzertruppe	Commander-in-chief of 5. Panzerarmee	18 February 1945	—
25	Theodor Tolsdorff	Heer	Generalmajor	Commander of 340. Volks-Grenadier-Division	18 March 1945	—
26	Dr. med. dent. Karl Mauss	Heer	Generalleutnant	Commander of 7. Panzer-Division	15 April 1945	—
27	Dietrich von Saucken	Heer	General der Panzertruppe	Commander-in-chief of Armeeoberkommando East Prussia	8 May 1945	—

Rank on day of award	Heer	Waffen-SS	Kriegsmarine	Luftwaffe	Foreigners	Totals
Generalfeldmarschall / Großadmiral	2			1		3
Generaloberst / Generaladmiral	1	1				2
General der Infanterie etc. / Admiral	4					4
Generalleutnant / Vizeadmiral	1	1		1		3
Generalmajor / Konteradmiral	1					1
Oberst / Kapitän zur See	2			2		4
Oberstleutnant / Fregattenkapitän				1		1
Major / Korvettenkapitän			2	2		4
Hauptmann / Kapitänleutnant				2		2
Oberleutnant / Oberleutnant zur See				3		3
Totals	11	2	2	12		27

== Knight's Cross with Oak Leaves and Swords ==
Knight's Cross of the Iron Cross with Oak Leaves and Swords
Year	Number of presentations	Posthumous presentations
1941	5	0
1942	18	1
1943	20	2
1944	76	10
1945	41	2

The "Knight's Cross with Oak Leaves and Swords" is also based on the enactment Reichsgesetzblatt I S. 613 of 28 September 1941 to reward those servicemen who had already been awarded the Oak Leaves to the Knight's Cross of the Iron Cross. The sequential numbers greater than 143 are unofficial and were assigned by the Association of Knight's Cross Recipients (AKCR) and therefore denoted in brackets. The number of the 160 Sword recipients is based on the analysis and acceptance of the order commission of the (AKCR). Author Veit Scherzer has challenged the validity of 13 of these listings. The majority—12 recipients—of these disputed recipients have received the award in 1945. The deteriorating situation of the Third Reich during the final days of World War II has left the nominations unfinished in various stages of the approval process. Hermann Fegelein had received the Oak Leaves in 1942 but was sentenced to death by Adolf Hitler and executed by SS-Gruppenführer Johann Rattenhuber's Reichssicherheitsdienst (RSD) on 28 April 1945 after a court martial led by SS-Brigadeführer and Generalmajor of the Waffen-SS Wilhelm Mohnke. The sentence was carried out the same day. The death sentence, according to German law, resulted in the loss of all orders and honorary signs.

No.	Name	Service	Rank	Role and unit	Date of award	Notes
1	Adolf Galland+	Luftwaffe	Oberstleutnant	Geschwaderkommodore of Jagdgeschwader 26 "Schlageter"	21 June 1941	Awarded 2nd Diamonds 28 January 1942
2	Werner Mölders+	Luftwaffe	Major	Geschwaderkommodore of Jagdgeschwader 51	22 June 1941	Awarded 1st Diamonds 15 July 1941
3	Walter Oesau	Luftwaffe	Hauptmann	Gruppenkommandeur of the III./Jagdgeschwader 3	15 July 1941 (Note: According to Scherzer on 16 July 1941.)	KIA 11 May 1944
4	Günther Lützow	Luftwaffe	Major	Geschwaderkommodore of Jagdgeschwader 3	11 October 1941	—
5	Otto Kretschmer	Kriegsmarine	Korvettenkapitän	Commander of U-99	26 December 1941	—
6	Erwin Rommel+	Heer	General der Panzertruppe	Commander of Panzergruppe Afrika	20 January 1942	Awarded 6th Diamonds 11 March 1943
7	Heinrich Bär	Luftwaffe	Hauptmann (Note: According to Scherzer as Hauptmann of the Reserves.)	Staffelkapitän of the 1./Jagdgeschwader 51 "Mölders"	16 February 1942	—
8	Hans Philipp	Luftwaffe	Hauptmann	Gruppenkommandeur of the I./Jagdgeschwader 54	12 March 1942	KIA 8 October 1943
9	Herbert Ihlefeld	Luftwaffe	Hauptmann	Gruppenkommandeur of the I./Jagdgeschwader 77	24 April 1942	—
10	Max-Hellmuth Ostermann	Luftwaffe	Oberleutnant	Staffelkapitän of the 7./Jagdgeschwader 54	17 May 1942	KIA 9 August 1942
11	Hermann Graf+	Luftwaffe	Leutnant of the Reserves	Staffelkapitän of the 9./Jagdgeschwader 52	19 May 1942 (Note: According to Scherzer on 18 May 1942.)	Awarded 5th Diamonds 16 September 1942
12	Hans-Joachim Marseille+	Luftwaffe	Oberleutnant	Staffelkapitän of the 3./Jagdgeschwader 27	18 June 1942	Awarded 4th Diamonds 3 September 1942
13	Gordon Gollob+	Luftwaffe	Hauptmann	Geschwaderkommodore of Jagdgeschwader 77	23 June 1942	Awarded 3rd Diamonds 30 August 1942
14	Leopold Steinbatz	Luftwaffe	Oberfeldwebel	Pilot in the 9./Jagdgeschwader 52	23 June 1942*	KIA 15 June 1942
15	Albert Kesselring+	Luftwaffe	Generalfeldmarschall	OB Süd	18 July 1942	Awarded 14th Diamonds 19 July 1944
16	Werner Baumbach	Luftwaffe	Hauptmann	Gruppenkommandeur of the I./Kampfgeschwader 30	17 August 1942 (Note: According to Scherzer on 16 August 1942.)	—
17	Erich Topp	Kriegsmarine	Kapitänleutnant	Commander of U-552	17 August 1942	—
18	Reinhard Suhren	Kriegsmarine	Kapitänleutnant	Commander of U-564	1 September 1942	—
19	Joachim Müncheberg	Luftwaffe	Hauptmann	Deputy Geschwaderkommodore of Jagdgeschwader 51 "Mölders"	9 September 1942	KIA 23 March 1943
20	Joachim Helbig	Luftwaffe	Hauptmann	Gruppenkommandeur of the I. (Kampf)/Lehrgeschwader 1	28 September 1942	—
21	Karl Eibl	Heer	Generalmajor	Commander of 385. Infanterie-Division	19 December 1942	KIA 21 January 1943
22	Hans Hube+	Heer	Generalleutnant	Commanding general of the XIV. Panzerkorps	21 December 1942	Awarded 13th Diamonds 20 April 1944
23	Wolf-Dietrich Wilcke	Luftwaffe	Major	Geschwaderkommodore of Jagdgeschwader 3 "Udet"	23 December 1942	— KIA 23 March 23 1944
24	Alfred Druschel	Luftwaffe	Hauptmann	Deputy Gruppenkommandeur of the I./Schlachtgeschwader 1	19 February 1943	—
25	Hermann Balck+	Heer	Generalleutnant	Commander of 11. Panzer-Division	4 March 1943	Awarded 19th Diamonds 31 August 1944
26	Josef Dietrich+	Waffen-SS	SS-Obergruppenführer and General of the Waffen-SS	Commander of SS-Panzergrenadier-Division "Leibstandarte SS Adolf Hitler"	14 March 1943	Awarded 16th Diamonds 6 August 1944
27	Hyazinth Graf Strachwitz von Gross-Zauche und Camminetz+	Heer	Oberst of the Reserves	Commander of Panzer-Regiment "Großdeutschland"	28 March 1943	Awarded 11th Diamonds 15 April 1944
28	Walter Model+	Heer	Generaloberst	Commander-in-chief of 9. Armee	2 April 1943	Awarded 17th Diamonds 17 August 1944 Committed suicide 21 April 1945
29	Wolfgang Lüth+	Kriegsmarine	Korvettenkapitän	Commander of U-181	15 April 1943	Awarded 7th Diamonds 9 August 1943
30	Walter Gorn	Heer	Oberst	Commander of Panzergrenadier-Regiment 10	8 June 1943	—
31	Dietrich Peltz	Luftwaffe	Oberst im Generalstab	Angriffsführer England	23 July 1943	—
32	Helmut Lent+	Luftwaffe	Major	Gruppenkommandeur of the IV./Nachtjagdgeschwader 1	2 August 1943	Awarded 15th Diamonds 31 July 1944
33	Adelbert Schulz+	Heer	Oberstleutnant	Commander of Panzer-Regiment 25	6 August 1943	Awarded 9th Diamonds 14 December 1943; KIA 28 January 1944
34	Günther Rall	Luftwaffe	Hauptmann	Gruppenkommandeur of the III./Jagdgeschwader 52	12 September 1943	—
35	Hermann Hoth	Heer	Generaloberst	Commander-in-chief of 4. Panzerarmee	15 September 1943	—
36	Josef Harpe	Heer	General der Panzertruppe	Commanding general of XXXXI Panzerkorps	15 September 1943	—
37	Walter Nowotny+	Luftwaffe	Hauptmann	Gruppenkommandeur of the I./Jagdgeschwader 54	22 September 1943	Awarded 8th Diamonds 19 October 1943; KIA 8 November 1944
38	Waldemar von Gazen, called von Gaza	Heer	Major	Leader of Panzergrenadier-Regiment 66	3 October 1943	—
39	August Dieckmann	Waffen-SS	SS-Obersturmbannführer	Commander of SS-Panzergrenadier-Regiment 10 "Westland"	10 October 1943*	KIA 10 October 1943
40	Günther Hans von Kluge	Heer	Generalfeldmarschall	Commander-in-chief of Heeresgruppe Mitte	29 October 1943	Committed suicide 19 August 1944
41	Gerhard Graf von Schwerin	Heer	Generalmajor	Commander of 16. Panzergrenadier-Division	4 November 1943	—
42	Hans-Ulrich Rudel+	Luftwaffe	Hauptmann	Gruppenkommandeur of the III./Sturzkampfgeschwader 2 "Immelmann" (Note: According to Scherzer as leader of the III./Sturzkampfgeschwader 2 "Immelmann".)	25 October 1943	Awarded 10th Diamonds 29 March 1944; 1st Golden Oak Leaves 29 December 1944
43	Hajo Herrmann	Luftwaffe	Oberst	Inspekteur der deutschen Luftverteidigung (Note: According to Scherzer as Inspekteur der Nachtjagd in the Reichsluftfahrtministerium and commander of the 30. Jagd-Division)	23 January 1944	—
44	Heinrich Prinz zu Sayn-Wittgenstein	Luftwaffe	Major	Geschwaderkommodore of Nachtjagdgeschwader 2	23 January 1944*	KIA 21 January 1944
45	Erich Bärenfänger	Heer	Major	Commander of the III./Grenadier-Regiment. 123	23 January 1944	Committed suicide 2 May 1945
46	Dietrich von Saucken+	Heer	Generalleutnant	Commander of 4. Panzer-Division	31 January 1944	Awarded 27th Diamonds 8 May 1945
47	Herbert Otto Gille+	Waffen-SS	SS-Gruppenführer and Generalleutnant of the Waffen-SS	Commander of SS-Panzergrenadier Division "Wiking"	20 February 1944	Awarded 12th Diamonds 19 April 1944
48	Hermann Breith	Heer	General der Panzertruppe	Commanding general of III. Panzerkorps	21 February 1944	—
49	Dr. med.dent. Franz Bäke	Heer	Oberstleutnant of the Reserves	Commander of Panzer-Regiment 11	21 February 1944	—
50	Hasso-Eccard von Manteuffel+	Heer	Generalleutnant	Commander of 7. Panzer-Division	22 February 1944'	Awarded 24th Diamonds 18 February 1945
51	Egon Mayer	Luftwaffe	Oberstleutnant	Geschwaderkommodore of Jagdgeschwader 2 "Richthofen"	2 March 1944*	KIA 2 March 1944
52	Gerhard Barkhorn	Luftwaffe	Hauptmann	Gruppenkommandeur of the II./Jagdgeschwader 52	2 March 1944	—
53	Franz Griesbach	Heer	Oberst	Commander of Grenadier-Regiment 399	6 March 1944	—
54	Werner Streib	Luftwaffe	Major	Geschwaderkommodore of Nachtjagdgeschwader 1	11 March 1944	—
55	Richard Heidrich	Luftwaffe	Generalleutnant	Commander of 1. Fallschirmjäger-Division	25 March 1944	—
56	Hinrich Schuldt	Waffen-SS	SS-Oberführer	Commander of 2. lett. SS-Freiwilligen-Brigade	25 March 1944*	KIA 15 March 1944
57	Georg-Wilhelm Postel	Heer	Generalleutnant	Commander of 320. Infanterie-Division	26 March 1944	—
58	Wend von Wietersheim	Heer	Generalmajor	Commander of 11. Panzer-Division	26 March 1944	—
59	Erich von Lewinski, called von Manstein	Heer	Generalfeldmarschall	Commander-in-chief of Heeresgruppe Süd	30 March 1944	—
60	Paul Ludwig Ewald von Kleist	Heer	Generalfeldmarschall	Commander-in-chief of Heeresgruppe A	30 March 1944	—
61	Alwin Boerst	Luftwaffe	Major	Gruppenkommandeur of the I./Schlachtgeschwader 2 "Immelmann"	6 April 1944*	KIA 30 March 1944
62	Dr. jur. Ernst Kupfer	Luftwaffe	Oberst	Former Geschwaderkommodore of Sturzkampfgeschwader 2	11 April 1944*	Killed in flying accident 6 November 1943
63	Hans Kreysing	Heer	General der Gebirgstruppe	Commanding general of XVII. Armeekorps	13 April 1944	—
64	Hans Jordan	Heer	General der Infanterie	Commanding general of VI. Armeekorps	20 April 1944	—
65	Hermann Prieß	Waffen-SS	SS-Brigadeführer and Generalmajor of the Waffen-SS	Commander of 3. SS-Panzer Division "Totenkopf"	24 April 1944	—
66	Albrecht Brandi+	Kriegsmarine	Fregattenkapitän	Commander of U-380	9 May 1944	Awarded 22nd Diamonds 24 November 1944
67	Ludwig Heilmann	Luftwaffe	Oberst	Commander of Fallschirmjäger-Regiment 3	15 May 1944	—
68	Georg-Hans Reinhardt	Heer	Generaloberst	Commander-in-chief of 3. Panzerarmee	26 May 1944	—
69	Horst Niemack	Heer	Oberst	Commander of Panzer-Füsilier-Regiment "Großdeutschland"	4 June 1944	—
70	Alfons König	Heer	Oberstleutnant of the Reserves	Commander of Grenadier-Regiment 199 "List"	9 June 1944	— KIA 8 July 1944
71	Michael Wittmann	Waffen-SS	SS-Hauptsturmführer	Chief of the 2./schwere SS-Panzer-Abteilung 501 (Note: According to Scherzer as chief of the 2./schwere SS-Panzer-Abteilung 101.)	22 June 1944	KIA 8 August 1944
72	Eduard Dietl	Heer	Generaloberst	Commander-in-chief of 20. Gebirgsarmee	1 July 1944*	Killed in flying accident 23 June 1944
73	Josef Priller	Luftwaffe	Oberstleutnant	Geschwaderkommodore of Jagdgeschwader 26 "Schlageter"	2 July 1944	—
74	Friedrich Lang	Luftwaffe	Major	Gruppenkommandeur of the III./Schlachtgeschwader 1	2 July 1944	—
75	Erich Hartmann+	Luftwaffe	Oberleutnant	Staffelkapitän of the 9./Jagdgeschwader 52	4 July 1944	Awarded 18th Diamonds 25 August 1944
76	Smilo Freiherr von Lüttwitz	Heer	Generalleutnant	Commander of 26. Panzer-Division	4 July 1944	—
77	Hans Dorr	Waffen-SS	SS-Sturmbannführer	Commander of SS-Panzergrenadier-Regiment 9 "Germania"	9 July 1944	Died of wounds 17 April 1945
78	Anton Hackl	Luftwaffe	Major	Gruppenkommandeur of the III./Jagdgeschwader 11	9 July 1944 (Note: According to Scherzer on 12 July 1944.)	—
79	Reiner Stahel	Heer	Generalmajor	Commander of Fester Platz Wilna	18 July 1944	—
80	Theodor Tolsdorff+	Heer	Oberstleutnant	Commander of Grenadier-Regiment 1067 and leader of a Kampfgruppe	18 July 1944	Awarded 25th Diamonds 18 March 1945
81	Fritz Bayerlein	Heer	Generalleutnant	Commander of Panzer-Lehr-Division	20 July 1944	—
82	Johannes Steinhoff	Luftwaffe	Oberstleutnant	Geschwaderkommodore of Jagdgeschwader 77	28 July 1944	—
83	Hermann Fegelein? (Note: Hermann Fegelein was sentenced to death by Hitler and executed by SS General Johann Rattenhuber's Reichssicherheitsdienst on 28 April 1945 after a court-martial led by SS-Brigadeführer and Generalmajor of the Waffen-SS Wilhelm Mohnke. The sentence was carried out the same day. The death sentence resulted in the loss of all orders and honorary signs.)	Waffen-SS	SS-Gruppenführer	Commander of 8. SS-Freiwilligen-Kavallerie-Division "Florian Geyer"	30 July 1944	Executed 28 April 1945
84	Heinz-Wolfgang Schnaufer+	Luftwaffe	Hauptmann	Gruppenkommandeur of the IV./Nachtjagdgeschwader 1	30 July 1944 (Note: According to Scherzer on 3 August 1944.)	Awarded 21st Diamonds 16 October 1944
85	Fritz von Scholz Edler von Rarancze	Waffen-SS	SS-Gruppenführer	Commander of 11. SS-Freiwilligen-Panzergrenadier Division "Nordland"	8 August 1944*	KIA 28 July 1944
86	Felix Steiner	Waffen-SS	SS-Obergruppenführer and General of the Waffen-SS	Commanding general of III. germanische SS-Panzerkorps	10 August 1944	—
87	Walter Fries	Heer	Generalleutnant	Commander of 29. Panzergrenadier Division	11 August 1944	—
88	Kurt Bühligen	Luftwaffe	Major	Geschwaderkommodore of Jagdgeschwader 2 "Richthofen"	14 August 1944	—
89	Dr. rer. pol., Dr. Ing. Johannes Mayer	Heer	Generalleutnant	Commander of 329. Infanterie-Division	23 August 1944	—
90	Paul Hausser	Waffen-SS	SS-Oberstgruppenführer and Generaloberst of the Waffen-SS	Commander-in-chief of 7. Armee	28 August 1944	—
91	Kurt Meyer	Waffen-SS	SS-Standartenführer	Commander of 12. SS-Panzer-Division "Hitlerjugend"	27 August 1944	—
92	Robert Ritter von Greim	Luftwaffe	Generaloberst	Commander-in-chief of Luftflotte 6	28 August 1944 (Note: According to Scherzer on 27 August 1944.)	—
93	Ferdinand Schörner+	Heer	Generaloberst	Commander-in-chief of Heeresgruppe Nord	28 August 1944	Awarded 23rd Diamonds 1 January 1945
94	Theodor Wisch	Waffen-SS	SS-Brigadeführer and Generalmajor of the Waffen-SS	Commander of 1. SS-Panzer Division "Leibstandarte SS Adolf Hitler"	30 August 1944	—
95	Otto Baum	Waffen-SS	SS-Standartenführer	Commander of 2. SS-Panzer Division "Das Reich"	2 September 1944	—
96	Hans Kroh	Luftwaffe	Oberst	Leader of 2. Fallschirmjäger-Division	12 September 1944	—
97	Wilhelm Wegener	Heer	General der Infanterie	Commanding general of L. Armeekorps	17 September 1944	KIA 24 September 1944
98	Theodor Nordmann	Luftwaffe	Major	Gruppenkommandeur of the II./Schlachtgeschwader 1	17 September 1944	—
99	Hermann-Bernhard Ramcke+	Luftwaffe	Generalleutnant	Commander of fortress Brest	19 September 1944	Awarded 20th Diamonds simultaneously with the Swords 19 September 1944
100	Otto von Knobelsdorff	Heer	General der Panzertruppe	Commanding general of XXXX. Panzerkorps	21 September 1944	—
101	Dr. med. dent. Karl Mauss+	Heer	Generalleutnant	Commander of 7. Panzer-Division	23 October 1944	Awarded 26th Diamonds 15 April 1945
102	Werner Ziegler	Heer	Major	Leader of Grenadier-Regiment 186	23 October 1944	—
103	Fritz Feßmann	Heer	Hauptmann of the Reserves	Commander of Panzer-Aufklärungs-Abteilung 5	23 October 1944*	KIA 11 October 1944
104	Hermann Recknagel	Heer	General der Infanterie	Commanding general of XXXXII. Armeekorps	23 October 1944	KIA 23 January 1945
105	Maximilian Reichsfreiherr von Edelsheim	Heer	Generalleutnant	Commander of 24. Panzer-Division	23 October 1944	—
106	Hans Källner	Heer	Generalleutnant	Commander of 19. Panzer-Division	23 October 1944	KIA 18 April 1945
107	Werner Mummert	Heer	Oberst of the Reserves	Commander of Panzergrenadier-Regiment 103	23 October 1944	—
108	Josef Wurmheller	Luftwaffe	Hauptmann	Gruppenkommandeur of the III./Jagdgeschwader 2 "Richthofen"	24 October 1944*	KIA 22 June 1944
109	Dr. rer. pol. Hermann Hohn	Heer	Generalmajor	Commander of 72. Infanterie-Division	31 October 1944	—
110	Hans von Obstfelder	Heer	General der Infanterie	Commanding general of LXXXVI. Armeekorps	5 November 1944	—
111	Ernst-Günther Baade	Heer	Generalleutnant	Commander of 90. Panzergrenadier Division	16 November 1944	KIA 8 May 1945
112	Karl-Lothar Schulz	Luftwaffe	Oberst	Leader of 1. Fallschirmjäger-Division	18 November 1944	—
113	Otto Kittel	Luftwaffe	Oberleutnant	Staffelkapitän of the 2./Jagdgeschwader 54	25 November 1944	KIA February 14/16 1945
114	Georg Freiherr von Boeselager	Heer	Oberstleutnant	Leader of 3. Kavallerie-Brigade	28 November 1944*	KIA 26 August 1944
115	Helmuth Weidling	Heer	General der Artillerie	Commanding general of XXXXI. Panzerkorps	28 November 1944	—
116	Heinz Harmel	Waffen-SS	SS-Brigadeführer and Generalmajor of the Waffen-SS	Commander of 10. SS-Panzer Division "Frundsberg"	15 December 1944	—
117	Traugott Herr	Heer	General der Panzertruppe	Commanding general of LXXVI. Panzerkorps	18 December 1944	—
118	Alfred-Hermann Reinhardt	Heer	Generalleutnant	Commander of 98. Infanterie-Division	24 December 1944	—
119	Joachim Peiper	Waffen-SS	SS-Obersturmbannführer	Commander of SS-Panzer-Regiment 1 "Leibstandarte SS Adolf Hitler"	11 January 1945	—
120	Walter Krüger	Waffen-SS	SS-Obergruppenführer and General of the Waffen-SS	Commanding general of VI. Waffen-Armeekorps der SS (Note: According to Scherzer as commanding general of the VI. SS-Freiwilligen Armeekorps)	11 January 1945	Committed suicide 22 May 1945
121	Wolfgang Kretzschmar	Heer	Oberst	Commander of Jäger-Regiment 24 (L)	12 January 1945*	KIA 27 December 1944
122	Dr. jur. Lothar Rendulic	Heer	Generaloberst	Commander-in-chief of 20. Gebirgs-Armee	18 January 1945	—
123	Maximilian Wengler	Heer	Generalmajor	Commander of 227. Infanterie-Division	21 January 1945	KIA 25 April 1945
124	Walther Nehring	Heer	General der Panzertruppe	Commanding general of XXIV. Panzerkorps	22 January 1945	—
125	Hermann Hogeback	Luftwaffe	Oberstleutnant	Geschwaderkommodore of Kampfgeschwader 6	26 January 1945	—
126	Erich Rudorffer	Luftwaffe	Major	Gruppenkommandeur of the II./Jagdgeschwader 54	26 January 1945	—
127	Friedrich Kirchner	Heer	General der Panzertruppe	Commanding general of LVII. Panzerkorps	26 January 1945	—
128	Friedrich-Wilhelm Müller	Heer	General der Infanterie	Commanding general of LXVIII. Armeekorps	27 January 1945	—
129	Helmut Dörner	Waffen-SS	SS-Oberführer	Leader of a Kampfgruppe in the 4. SS-Polizei Panzergrenadier Division	1 February 1945	KIA 11 February 1945
130	Ernst-Wilhelm Reinert	Luftwaffe	Oberleutnant	Staffelkapitän of the 14./Jagdgeschwader 27	1 February 1945	—
131	Erich Walther	Luftwaffe	Oberst	Leader of Fallschirm-Panzergrenadier-Division 2 "Hermann Göring"	1 February 1945	—
132	Max Sachsenheimer	Heer	Generalmajor	Commander of 17. Infanterie-Division	6 February 1945	—
133	Gerd von Rundstedt	Heer	Generalfeldmarschall	OB West	18 February 1945	—
134	Dietrich von Müller	Heer	Generalmajor	Commander of 16. Panzer-Division	20 February 1945	—
135	Friedrich Schulz	Heer	General der Infanterie	Commander-in-chief of 17. Armee	26 February 1945	—
136	Gotthard Heinrici	Heer	Generaloberst	Commander-in-chief of 1. Panzerarmee	3 March 1945	—
137	Heinz-Georg Lemm	Heer	Oberstleutnant	Commander of Füsilier-Regiment 27	15 March 1945	—
138	Otto Kumm	Waffen-SS	SS-Brigadeführer and Generalmajor of the Waffen-SS	Commander of 7. SS-Freiwilligen-Gebirgs-Division "Prinz Eugen"	17 Mar 1945	—
139	Walter Hartmann	Heer	General der Artillerie	Commanding general of VIII. Armeekorps	18 March 1945	—
140	Georg Bochmann	Waffen-SS	SS-Oberführer	Leader of 18. SS-Freiwilligen-Panzergrenadier-Division "Horst Wessel"	30 March 1945	—
141	Arthur Jüttner	Heer	Oberst	Commander of Grenadier-Regiment 164	5 April 1945	—
142	Hermann von Oppeln-Bronikowski	Heer	Generalmajor	Commander of 20. Panzer-Division	17 April 1945	—
143	Hellmuth Mäder	Heer	Generalmajor	Commander of Führer-Grenadier Division	18 April 1945	—
(144)	Werner Schröer	Luftwaffe	Major	Geschwaderkommodore of Jagdgeschwader 3 "Udet"	19 April 1945 (Note: According to Scherzer on 16 April 1945.)	—
(145)	Wilhelm Batz	Luftwaffe	Major	Gruppenkommandeur of the II./Jagdgeschwader 52	21 April 1945	—
(146)	Johannes Blaskowitz	Heer	Generaloberst	OB Niederlande	24 April 1945	—
(147)	Hermann Niehoff? (Note: The German Federal Archives hold no records for the presentation of the Swords to Hermann Niehoff. The Association of Knight's Cross Recipients (AKCR) only assumes that the Swords were awarded. According to Niehoff's testimony he was nominated by Gauleiter Karl Hanke. The date and sequential number "147" were assigned by the AKCR. Niehoff was a member of the AKCR.)	Heer	General der Infanterie	Commander of fortress Breslau	26 April 1945	—
(148)	Hermann-Heinrich Behrend	Heer	Generalmajor	Commander of 490. Infanterie-Division	26 April 1945	—
(149)	Karl Decker? (Note: The German Federal Archives hold no records for the presentation of the Swords to Karl Decker. The Association of Knight's Cross Recipients (AKCR) assumes that the presentation fell into the timeframe 20 April 1945 to 29 April 1945. It is assumed that the nomination was approved on 26 April 1945. Scherzer states that the assumption is based on a statement from Decker's widow. She claimed that she had been informed that her husband had received the award. The date and sequential number "149" were assigned by the AKCR.)	Heer	General der Panzertruppe	Commanding general of XXXIX. Panzerkorps	26 April 1945*	Committed suicide 21 April 1945
(150)	Otto Weidinger? (Note: The German Federal Archives hold no records for the presentation of the Swords to Otto Weidinger. The award was unlawfully presented by SS-Oberstgruppenführer Sepp Dietrich. The date is taken from the announcement made by the 6. SS-Panzerarmee. The sequential number "150" was assigned by the Association of Knight's Cross Recipients (AKCR), who counted Weidinger in their number.)	Waffen-SS	SS-Obersturmbannführer	Commander of SS-Panzergrenadier-Regiment 4 "Der Führer"	6 May 1945	—
(151)	Günther-Eberhardt Wisliceny? (Note: The German Federal Archives hold no records for the presentation of the Swords to Günther-Eberhardt Wisliceny. The award was unlawfully presented by SS-Oberstgruppenführer Sepp Dietrich. The date is taken from the announcement made by the 6. SS-Panzerarmee. The sequential number "151" was assigned by the Association of Knight's Cross Recipients (AKCR). Wisliceny was a member of the AKCR.)	Waffen-SS	SS-Obersturmbannführer	Commander of SS-Panzergrenadier-Regiment 3 "Deutschland"	6 May 1945	—
(152)	Sylvester Stadler? (Note: The German Federal Archives hold no records for the presentation of the Swords to Sylvester Stadler, also not mentioned by the order commission of the Association of Knight's Cross Recipients (AKCR). According to Fellgiebel, the award was presented by SS-Oberstgruppenführer Sepp Dietrich, which would make it an unlawful presentation. Fellgiebel is referring to Hermann Buch, the former IIa (personnel administration) of the 2. SS-Division "Das Reich", and Wilhelm Kment, the adjutant of Heinrich Himmler and liaison officer to the Heerespersonalamt (HPA—Army Staff Office), as sources. Buch reported on 25 June 2004 that he hadn't to do anything with this case. Stadler himself claimed that Dietrich proposed him on 22 March 1945, even though the 9. SS-Panzer-Division "Hohenstaufen" was not subordinated to the 6. SS-Panzerarmee. The sequential number "152" was assigned by the AKCR. The date might have been taken from Ernst-Günther Krätschmer.)	Waffen-SS	SS-Oberführer	Commander of 9. SS-Panzer Division "Hohenstaufen"	6 May 1945	—
(153)	Wilhelm Bittrich? (Note: The German Federal Archives hold no records for the presentation of the Swords to Wilhelm Bittrich. The award was unlawfully presented SS-Oberstgruppenführer Sepp Dietrich. The date is taken from the announcement made by the 6. SS-Panzerarmee. The sequential number "153" was assigned by the Association of Knight's Cross Recipients (AKCR). Bittrich was a member of the AKCR.)	Waffen-SS	SS-Obergruppenführer and General of the Waffen-SS	Commanding general of II. SS-Panzerkorps	6 May 1945	—
(154)	Fritz-Hubert Gräser? (Note: Fritz-Hubert Gräser's nomination by the troop was received by the Heerespersonalamt (HPA—Army Personnel Office) on 29 April 1945. General Ernst Maisel noted: "I approve the nomination! 30 April". The nomination list for the higher grades of the Knight's Cross of the Iron Cross only notes the nomination entry date as 29 April 1945. There is no indication that the award was granted. The paperwork was not finalized by the end of the war. The Association of Knight's Cross Recipients (AKCR) claims that the award was presented in accordance with the Dönitz-decree. This is illegal according to the Deutsche Dienststelle (WASt) and lacks legal justification. The sequential number "154" and presentation date were assigned by the AKCR.)	Heer	General der Panzertruppe	Commander-in-chief of 4. Panzerarmee	8 May 1945	—
(155)	Eugen Meindl? (Note: Eugen Meindl's nomination by the troop was approved by each of his commanding officers. However the nomination contains no final remark on the proceedings. Oberst Nicolaus von Below, Hitler's Luftwaffe adjutant, had sent a teleprinter message to the commanding general of the Fallschirmarmee Generaloberst Kurt Student, requesting a statement for this nomination. The copy of the teleprinter message contains a note: resubmission "23 April 1945". It seems that the statement was never returned. The paperwork was not finalized by the end of the war. The Association of Knight's Cross Recipients (AKCR) claims that the award was presented in accordance with the Dönitz-decree. This is illegal according to the Deutsche Dienststelle (WASt) and lacks legal justification. The sequential number "155" was assigned by the AKCR. Fellgiebel assigned the presentation date. Meindl is mentioned on a list of the Oberbefehlshaber Nordwest for "Nominations and Bestowal of War Awards" from May 1945. This list, which was intended to be presented to Karl Dönitz, contained twelve names of pending nominations which had been submitted via the chain of command. Dönitz has never signed this list, most likely he has never even seen this list. The responsible personnel offices awarded or declined eight nominations from this list by the end of the war by, two remained unprocessed by the Heerespersonalamt (HPA—Personnel Office) and Luftwaffenpersonalamt (LPA — Luftwaffe Personnel Office) and two further were left ready for signing at the Oberkommando der Wehrmacht/Wehrmacht-Führungsstab (OKW/WFSt—Oberkommando der Wehrmacht/Wehrmacht-Führungsstab—leadership staff of the Army High Command).)	Luftwaffe	General der Fallschirmtruppe	Commanding general of II. Fallschirm-Korps	8 May 1945	—
(156)	Karl Alfred Thieme? (Note: Karl Thieme's nomination by the troop was received by the Heerespersonalamt (HPA—Army Personnel Office) on 10 April 1945 via teleprinter. Major Joachim Domaschk noted "By no means sufficient! Requesting statement from OB West", which was requested on 13 April. OB West responded on 24 April (entry date at the Heerespersonalamt on 28 April): "Statement from OB West not possible, since nomination was not made via OB West". Major Joachim Domaschk then decided on 28 April: "Heeresgruppe B, postpone!" In this instance the nomination was not processed due to AHA 44 Ziff. 572 (Allgemeines Heeresamt — General Army Office) but also because statements from his commanding officers could not be obtained anymore due to the capitulation. The nomination list for the higher grades of the Knight's Cross of the Iron Cross also contains a note from 10 April 1945: postponed. A bestowal thus didn't occur. The Association of Knight's Cross Recipients (AKCR) claims that the award was presented in accordance with the Dönitz-decree. This is illegal according to the Deutsche Dienststelle (WASt) and lacks legal justification. The sequential number "156" was assigned by the AKCR. Fellgiebel assigned the presentation date.)	Heer	Oberstleutnant	Commander of Panzergrenadier-Regiment 111	9 May 1945	—
(157)	Heinrich Freiherr von Lüttwitz? (Note: Heinrich von Lüttwitz's nomination by the troop was received by the Heerespersonalamt (HPA—Army Personnel Office) on 28 April 1945. Major Joachim Domaschk decided on 30 April: "Heeresgruppe B, postpone!" General Von Lüttwiz together with the remaining forces of the Heeresgruppe B was either taken prisoner of war or missing in action in the Ruhr Pocket on 15 April. The nomination was thus not further processed in accordance with AHA 44 Ziff. 572 (Allgemeines Heeresamt — General Army Office). The nomination list for the higher grades of the Knight's Cross of the Iron Cross also contains a note from 28 April 1945: "postponed". A bestowal thus didn't occur. The sequential number "157" and presentation date were assigned by the Association of Knight's Cross Recipients (AKCR).)	Heer	General der Panzertruppe	Commanding general of XXXXVII. Panzerkorps	9 May 1945	—
(158)	Otto Hitzfeld? (Note: Otto Hitzfeld's nomination was rejected by Major Joachim Domaschk on 30 April 1945 and commented: "This is not a nomination!" (Only leadership and organisational achievements, no personal bravery) he additionally noted: "missing in cauldron AOK 11". The nomination was thus assessed as insufficient as well as postponed according to AHA 44 Ziff. 572 (Allgemeines Heeresamt — General Army Office). The entry date noted on the nomination list for the higher grades of the Knight's Cross of the Iron Cross is 28 April 1945. The list indicates a note "deferred". The approval cannot be proven. The order commission of the Association of Knight's Cross Recipients (AKCR) handled the case in 1981 and decided: Swords yes, 9 May 1945. The AKCR claims that the award was presented in accordance with the Dönitz-decree. This is illegal according to the Deutsche Dienststelle (WASt) and lacks legal justification. The sequential number "158" and presentation date was assigned by the AKCR. Hitzfeld was a member of the AKCR.)	Heer	General der Infanterie	Commanding general of LXVII. Armeekorps	9 May 1945	—
(159)	Josef Bremm? (Note: Josef Bremm's nomination by the troop was rejected by Major Joachim Domaschk on 30 April 1945 and instead recommended for the German Cross in Gold. Just like all other nominations, which at this point in time were related to members of the 11. Armee, the nomination was not further processed since the 11. Armee had capitulated on 21 April 1945 and presentations to prisoners of war or missing in action were prohibited. In all other instances of similar circumstances a note on the nomination can be found stating: "postpone AOK 11" or "postpone according to AHA 44 Ziff. 572 (Allgemeines Heeresamt — General Army Office)". The entry date noted on the nomination list for the higher grades of the Knight's Cross of the Iron Cross is 28 April 1945. The list indicates a note "deferred". The Association of Knight's Cross Recipients (AKCR) claims that the award was presented in accordance with the Dönitz-decree. This is illegal according to the Deutsche Dienststelle (WASt) and lacks legal justification. The sequential number "159" was assigned by the AKCR. The presentation date was assigned by Fellgiebel. Bremm was a member of the AKCR.)	Heer	Oberstleutnant	Commander of Grenadier-Regiment 990	9 May 1945	—
	Isoroku Yamamoto	Imperial Japanese Navy	Fleet Admiral	Commander-in-chief of the IJN Combined Fleet	27 May 1943*	KIA 18 April 1943

Rank on day of award	Heer	Waffen-SS	Kriegsmarine	Luftwaffe	Foreigners	Totals
Generalfeldmarschall / Großadmiral	4			1	1	6
Generaloberst / Generaladmiral	8	1		1		10
General der Infanterie etc. / Admiral	21	4		1		26
Generalleutnant / Vizeadmiral	13	3		2		18
Generalmajor / Konteradmiral	12	4				16
Oberst / Kapitän zur See	7	6		7		20
Oberstleutnant / Fregattenkapitän	8	4		6		18
Major / Korvettenkapitän	3	1	1	13		18
Hauptmann / Kapitänleutnant	1		4	15		20
Oberleutnant / Oberleutnant zur See		1		5		6
Leutnant / Leutnant zur See				1		1
Oberfeldwebel / Oberwachtmeister				1		1
Totals	77	24	5	53	1	160

== Knight's Cross with Oak Leaves ==
Knight's Cross of the Iron Cross with Oak Leaves
Year	Number of presentations	Posthumous presentations
1940	7	0
1941	50	3
1942	111	7
1943	192	17
1944	328	46
1945	194	19

The Knight's Cross with Oak Leaves was based on the enactment Reichsgesetzblatt I S. 849 of 3 June 1940. A total of 7 awards were made in 1940; 50 in 1941; 111 in 1942; 192 in 1943; 328 in 1944, and 194 in 1945, giving a total of 882 recipients—excluding the 8 foreign recipients of the Knight's Cross of the Iron Cross with Oak Leaves.

The number of 882 Oak Leaves recipients is based on the analysis and acceptance of the order commission of the Association of Knight's Cross Recipients (AKCR). Author Veit Scherzer has challenged the validity of 27 of these listings. With the exception of Hermann Fegelein, all of the disputed recipients had received the award in 1945, when the deteriorating situation of the Third Reich during the final days of World War II left the nominations unfinished in various stages of the approval process.

- List of Knight's Cross of the Iron Cross with Oak Leaves recipients (1940–1941)
- List of Knight's Cross of the Iron Cross with Oak Leaves recipients (1942)
- List of Knight's Cross of the Iron Cross with Oak Leaves recipients (1943)
- List of Knight's Cross of the Iron Cross with Oak Leaves recipients (1944)
- List of Knight's Cross of the Iron Cross with Oak Leaves recipients (1945)

Rank on day of award	Heer	Waffen-SS	Kriegsmarine	Luftwaffe	Foreigners	Totals
Generalfeldmarschall / Großadmiral	6		1	1	3	11
Generaloberst / Generaladmiral	11			3	1	15
General der Infanterie etc. / Admiral	50	8	2	4		64
Generalleutnant / Vizeadmiral	77	6	1	5	2	91
Generalmajor / Konteradmiral	43	9	1	5	1	59
Oberst / Kapitän zur See	78	12	5	8		103
Oberstleutnant / Fregattenkapitän	47	19	3	19		88
Major / Korvettenkapitän	73	9	11	53	1	147
Hauptmann / Kapitänleutnant	68	6	24	76		174
Oberleutnant / Oberleutnant zur See	19	4	5	40		68
Leutnant / Leutnant zur See	11	1		21		33
Stabsfeldwebel / Stabswachtmeister	1					1
Oberfeldwebel / Oberwachtmeister	17			7		24
Feldwebel / Wachtmeister	5			4		9
Unteroffizier / Oberjäger	3					3
Totals	509	74	53	246	8	890

== Knight's Cross of the Iron Cross ==
Knight's Cross of the Iron Cross
Year	Number of presentations	Posthumous presentations
1939	26	0
1940	448	9
1941	787	34
1942	975	68
1943	1,422	136
1944	2,468	240
1945	1,195	94

The Knight's Cross of the Iron Cross is based on the enactment Reichsgesetzblatt I S. 1573 of September 1, 1939 Verordnung über die Erneuerung des Eisernen Kreuzes (Regulation of the renewing of the Iron Cross).

- List of Knight's Cross of the Iron Cross recipients (A)
- List of Knight's Cross of the Iron Cross recipients (Ba–Bm)
- List of Knight's Cross of the Iron Cross recipients (Bn–Bz)
- List of Knight's Cross of the Iron Cross recipients (C)
- List of Knight's Cross of the Iron Cross recipients (D)
- List of Knight's Cross of the Iron Cross recipients (E)
- List of Knight's Cross of the Iron Cross recipients (F)
- List of Knight's Cross of the Iron Cross recipients (G)
- List of Knight's Cross of the Iron Cross recipients (Ha–Hm)
- List of Knight's Cross of the Iron Cross recipients (Hn–Hz)
- List of Knight's Cross of the Iron Cross recipients (I)
- List of Knight's Cross of the Iron Cross recipients (J)
- List of Knight's Cross of the Iron Cross recipients (Ka–Km)
- List of Knight's Cross of the Iron Cross recipients (Kn–Kz)
- List of Knight's Cross of the Iron Cross recipients (L)
- List of Knight's Cross of the Iron Cross recipients (M)
- List of Knight's Cross of the Iron Cross recipients (N)
- List of Knight's Cross of the Iron Cross recipients (O)
- List of Knight's Cross of the Iron Cross recipients (P)
- List of Knight's Cross of the Iron Cross recipients (Q)
- List of Knight's Cross of the Iron Cross recipients (R)
- List of Knight's Cross of the Iron Cross recipients (Sa–Schr)
- List of Knight's Cross of the Iron Cross recipients (Schu–Sz)
- List of Knight's Cross of the Iron Cross recipients (T)
- List of Knight's Cross of the Iron Cross recipients (U)
- List of Knight's Cross of the Iron Cross recipients (V)
- List of Knight's Cross of the Iron Cross recipients (W)
- List of Knight's Cross of the Iron Cross recipients (X)
- List of Knight's Cross of the Iron Cross recipients (Z)

Beginning letter	Recipients According to AKCR	Additional recipients According to Veit Scherzer	Delisted According to AKCR	Disputed According to Veit Scherzer
A	118	—	1	3
Ba–Bm, Bn–Bz	368 + 357 = 725	—	1	13 + 8 = 21
C	82	—	—	—
D	238	—	—	6
E	188	—	—	3
F	280	—	1	12
G	380	—	1	11
Ha–Hm, Hn–Hz	437 + 224 = 661	—	1	15 + 14 = 29
I	26	—	—	—
J	142	—	1	4
Ka–Km, Kn–Kz	289 + 428 = 717	—	1	4 + 8 = 12
L	386	—	—	16
M	457	—	1	7
N	145	—	2	2
O	82	—	—	2
P	324	—	1	5
Q	7	—	—	—
R	447	1	—	11
Sa–Schr, Schu–Sz	457 + 603 = 1,060	—	—	11 + 14 = 25
T	182	—	—	5
U	32	—	—	1
V	92	—	—	5
W	446	—	—	11
X	1	—	—	—
Z	103	—	—	2
Totals	7,321	1	11	193

=== Non-existent recipients ===
Since the end of World War II, numerous people have claimed to be unrecognised recipients of the Knight's Cross. The majority of these "recipients" are lacking any evidence to sustain their claims and are thus denied the right to consider themselves "legal recipients". There are two cases where the legal proof of the award exists even though the recipients do not. These two "legally correct" recipients are Günther Nowak and Heinrich Scherhorn.

Günther Nowak, Hitlerjugend, was awarded the Knight's Cross on 14 February 1945 for the destruction of eleven tanks in Hindenburg, Oberschlesien. It was always assumed that he was the youngest recipient of the Knight's Cross; however, Günther Nowak never really existed — a deserting Commander of the Volkssturm named Sachs was caught and claimed that, after the retreat of the Wehrmacht, he had destroyed five tanks single-handedly. Because of this, he was taken to a Gauleiter. Fearing that his lie would be unveiled, he created the story of Günther Nowak in order to lessen his own "feat". This report was then sent to Reichsleiter Martin Bormann. Bormann immediately awarded the German Cross in Gold to the Volkssturm-Commander Sachs and the Knight's Cross to Nowak.

== Foreign recipients ==
Foreign servicemen who did not serve in the German Wehrmacht or the Waffen-SS during World War II and were awarded the Knight's Cross of the Iron Cross or its higher grade the Knight's Cross with Oak Leaves are listed in the List of foreign recipients of the Knight's Cross of the Iron Cross.
