= List of Knight's Cross of the Iron Cross recipients (X–Z) =

The Knight's Cross of the Iron Cross (German: Ritterkreuz des Eisernen Kreuzes) and its variants were the highest awards in the military and paramilitary forces of Nazi Germany during World War II. The Knight's Cross of the Iron Cross was awarded for a wide range of reasons and across all ranks, from a senior commander for skilled leadership of his troops in battle to a low-ranking soldier for a single act of extreme gallantry. A total of 7,321 awards were made between its first presentation on 30 September 1939 and its last bestowal on 17 June 1945. (Note: Großadmiral and President of Germany Karl Dönitz, Hitler's successor as Head of State (Staatsoberhaupt) and Supreme Commander of the Armed Forces, had ordered the cessation of all promotions and awards as of 11 May 1945 (Dönitz-decree). Consequently the last Knight's Cross awarded to Oberleutnant zur See of the Reserves Georg-Wolfgang Feller on 17 June 1945 must therefore be considered a de facto but not de jure hand-out.) This number is based on the analysis and acceptance of the order commission of the Association of Knight's Cross Recipients (AKCR). Presentations were made to members of the three military branches of the Wehrmacht—the Heer (Army), Kriegsmarine (Navy) and Luftwaffe (Air Force)—as well as the Waffen-SS, the Reichsarbeitsdienst (RAD—Reich Labour Service) and the Volkssturm (German national militia). There were also 43 recipients in the military forces of allies of the Third Reich.

These recipients are listed in the 1986 edition of Walther-Peer Fellgiebel's book, Die Träger des Ritterkreuzes des Eisernen Kreuzes 1939–1945 — The Bearers of the Knight's Cross of the Iron Cross 1939–1945. Fellgiebel was the former chairman and head of the order commission of the AKCR. In 1996, the second edition of this book was published with an addendum delisting 11 of these original recipients. Author Veit Scherzer has cast doubt on a further 193 of these listings. The majority of the disputed recipients had received the award in 1945, when the deteriorating situation of Germany in the final days of World War II in Europe left a number of nominations incomplete and pending in various stages of the approval process.

Listed here are the 104 Knight's Cross recipients whose last name starts in the range of "X" to "Z". Veit Scherzer has challenged the validity of 2 of these listings. The recipients are ordered alphabetically by last name. The rank listed is the recipient's rank at the time the Knight's Cross was awarded.

== Background ==
The Knight's Cross of the Iron Cross and its higher grades were based on four separate enactments. The first enactment, Reichsgesetzblatt I S. 1573 of 1 September 1939 instituted the Iron Cross (Eisernes Kreuz), the Knight's Cross of the Iron Cross and the Grand Cross of the Iron Cross (Großkreuz des Eisernen Kreuzes). Article 2 of the enactment mandated that the award of a higher class be preceded by the award of all preceding classes. As the war progressed, some of the recipients of the Knight's Cross distinguished themselves further and a higher grade, the Knight's Cross of the Iron Cross with Oak Leaves (Ritterkreuz des Eisernen Kreuzes mit Eichenlaub), was instituted. The Oak Leaves, as they were commonly referred to, were based on the enactment Reichsgesetzblatt I S. 849 of 3 June 1940. In 1941, two higher grades of the Knight's Cross were instituted. The enactment Reichsgesetzblatt I S. 613 of 28 September 1941 introduced the Knight's Cross of the Iron Cross with Oak Leaves and Swords (Ritterkreuz des Eisernen Kreuzes mit Eichenlaub und Schwertern) and the Knight's Cross of the Iron Cross with Oak Leaves, Swords and Diamonds (Ritterkreuz des Eisernen Kreuzes mit Eichenlaub, Schwertern und Brillanten). At the end of 1944 the final grade, the Knight's Cross of the Iron Cross with Golden Oak Leaves, Swords, and Diamonds (Ritterkreuz des Eisernen Kreuzes mit goldenem Eichenlaub, Schwertern und Brillanten), based on the enactment Reichsgesetzblatt 1945 I S. 11 of 29 December 1944, became the final variant of the Knight's Cross authorized.

== Recipients ==
The Oberkommando der Wehrmacht (Supreme Command of the Armed Forces) kept separate Knight's Cross lists for the Heer (Army), Kriegsmarine (Navy), Luftwaffe (Air Force) and Waffen-SS. Within each of these lists a unique sequential number was assigned to each recipient. The same numbering paradigm was applied to the higher grades of the Knight's Cross, one list per grade. Of the 104 awards made to servicemen whose last name starts in the range of "X" to "Z", only Wolf-Dietrich Ritter und Edler von Xylander's last name starts with "X". Of these 104 recipients, eleven were later awarded the Knight's Cross of the Iron Cross with Oak Leaves and one the Knight's Cross of the Iron Cross with Oak Leaves and Swords; seven presentations were made posthumously. Heer members received seventy-four of the medals, three went to the Kriegsmarine, twenty-three to the Luftwaffe, and four to the Waffen-SS. The sequential numbers greater than 843 for the Knight's Cross of the Iron Cross with Oak Leaves are unofficial and were assigned by the Association of Knight's Cross Recipients (AKCR) and are therefore denoted in parentheses.

This along with the + (plus) indicates that a higher grade of Knight's Cross was awarded as well.
This along with the * (asterisk) indicates that the Knight's Cross was awarded posthumously.
This along with the ? (question mark) indicates that author Veit Scherzer has expressed doubt regarding the veracity or formal correctness of the listing.

=== Last name starting with "X" ===
Name	Service	Rank	Role and unit (Note: For an explanation of the various naming schemes used by the Luftwaffe, Heer, Kriegsmarine and Waffen-SS refer to nomenclature used by the Wehrmacht and Waffen-SS.)	Date of award	Notes	Image
Wolf-Dietrich Ritter und Edler von Xylander	Heer	Generalleutnant	Chief of the Generalstab of HeeresGruppe Mitte	20 February 1945*	Killed in airplane crash 15 February 1945	—

=== Last name starting with "Z" ===
Name	Service	Rank	Role and unit	Date of award	Notes	Image
Edel-Heinrich Zachariae-Lingenthal	Heer	Hauptmann	Commander of the II./Panzer-Regiment 15	18 September 1943	—	—
Erich Zähr	Luftwaffe	Major	Commander of Kampfgruppe z.b.V. 172	23 December 1942	—	—
Alfred Zahn	Heer	Hauptmann of the Reserves	Leader of the III./Grenadier-Regiment 96	17 March 1943	—	—
Dr. rer. oec. Eberhard Zahn+	Heer	Leutnant of the Reserves	Zugführer (platoon leader) in the 2./Panzer-Jäger-Abteilung 33	30 June 1941	Awarded 204th Oak Leaves 6 March 1943	—
Hilmar Zahn	Luftwaffe	Oberleutnant	Chief of the 5./Fallschirmjäger-Regiment 1	9 June 1944	—	—
Lothar Zahn	Heer	Major	Commander of the III./Grenadier-Regiment 30 (motorized)	2 October 1943	—	—
Willi Zahn	Heer	Oberfeldwebel	Zugführer (platoon leader) in the 14.(Panzer-Jäger)/Grenadier-Regiment 507	18 July 1943*	Killed in action 16 July 1943	—
Helmut Zander	Heer	Oberstleutnant	Commander of Panzergrenadier-Regiment 60	5 April 1945	—	—
Gustav-Adolf von Zangen+	Heer	Oberst	Commander of Infanterie-Regiment 88 and leader of the 17. Infanterie-Division (Note: According to Scherzer as commander of Infanterie-Regiment 88.)	15 January 1942	Awarded 647th Oak Leaves 5 November 1944	
Albert Zapf	Heer	Oberleutnant	Leader of the III./Panzergrenadier-Regiment 129	23 February 1944	—	—
Robert-Richard Zapp	Kriegsmarine	Korvettenkapitän	Commander of U-66	23 April 1942	—	
Max Zastrow	Heer	Gefreiter	Machine gunner in the 2./Pionier-Bataillon 81	6 March 1944	—	—
Franz Zauner	Luftwaffe	Major (Note: According to Scherzer as Hauptmann.)	Gruppenkommandeur of the III./Kampfgeschwader 54	5 February 1944	—	—
Paul Zebhauser	Luftwaffe	Oberfeldwebel	Pilot in the 16./Transportgeschwader 1	18 November 1944	—	—
Konrad Zecherle	Heer	Leutnant of the Reserves	Zugführer (platoon leader) in the 1./Panzer-Aufklärungs-Abteilung 90	10 May 1943	—	—
August Zehender+	Waffen-SS	SS-Obersturmbannführer	Commander of the SS-Kavallerie-Regiment 1 "Florian Geyer" (Note: According to Scherzer as commander of the SS-Kavallerie-Regiment 2.)	10 March 1943	Awarded 722nd Oak Leaves 1 February 1945	
Eugen Zehnder	Heer	Oberjäger	Group leader in the 1./Gebirgsjäger-Regiment 13	7 March 1943	—	—
Markus Zeidler	Luftwaffe	Major	Commander of Kampfgruppe z.b.V. 600	9 May 1942	—	—
Robert Zeiher	Heer	Hauptmann of the Reserves	Leader of the 1./SS-Grenadier-Regiment "Radolfzell" (Note: According to Scherzer as leader of the 1./SS-Regiment "Radolfzell", mobilized part of the SS-Unterführer Schule "Radolfzell" (189. Infanterie-Division).)	16 January 1945	—	—
Kurt Zeitzler	Heer	Oberst im Generalstab (in the General Staff)	Chief of the general staff of the Panzer-Gruppe 1	18 May 1941	—	
Franz Zejdlik	Heer	Major	Commander of Panzer-Pionier-Bataillon 51	4 October 1942	—	—
Ernst Zeller	Heer	Oberleutnant of the Reserves	Leader of the 3./Artillerie-Regiment 114	16 November 1943	—	—
Konrad Zeller+	Heer	Hauptmann of the Reserves	Commander of the I./Grenadier-Regiment 380	5 January 1944	Awarded 495th Oak Leaves 9 June 1944	—
Willy Zeller	Heer	Leutnant (Note: According to Scherzer as Leutnant of the Reserves.)	Leader of the 9./Grenadier-Regiment 380	7 February 1944	—	—
Johann Zellner	Luftwaffe	Feldwebel	Pilot in the 3./Sturzkampfgeschwader 77	20 July 1944	—	—
Karl Zellner	Luftwaffe	Feldwebel	Pilot in the 1./Sturzkampfgeschwader 77	29 February 1944*	Killed in flying accident 13 September 1943	—
Walter Zellot	Luftwaffe	Leutnant	Pilot in the I./Jagdgeschwader 53	3 September 1942	—	—
Friedrich Zempel	Heer	Leutnant of the Reserves	Leader of the 3./Divisions-Füsilier-Bataillon (A.A.) 112	4 May 1944	—	—
Johann Zemsky+	Luftwaffe	Hauptmann	Gruppenkommandeur of the II./Sturzkampfgeschwader 1	4 February 1942	Awarded 117th Oak Leaves 3 September 1942	
Franz Zenker	Heer	Hauptmann	Commander of the Panzer-Jäger-Abteilung 12 (Note: According to Scherzer as commander of the Panzer-Jäger-Abteilung 12 (L).)	10 September 1944	—	—
Gottfried Zepf	Heer	Oberfeldwebel	Zugführer (platoon leader) in the 3./Panzer-Regiment 36	26 November 1944	—	—
Alois Zepner	Heer	Hauptmann	Leader of the III./Jäger-Regiment 38	10 September 1944	—	—
Erich Zepper	Waffen-SS	SS-Hauptscharführer	Deputy leader of the 2./SS-Panzergrenadier-Regiment 10 "Westland" (Note: According to Scherzer as leader of the 2./SS-Panzergrenadier-Regiment 10 "Westland".)	2 December 1943	—	—
Erich Zernin	Heer	Oberleutnant	Leader of the 5./Panzer-Regiment 11	13 September 1943*	Killed in action 13 August 1943	—
Jakob Zerth	Heer	Gefreiter	Deputy group leader in the 3./Grenadier-Regiment 467	21 April 1944	—	—
Rudolf Zettler	Heer	Hauptmann	Commander of the Sturmgeschütz-Abteilung 667	18 October 1943	—	—
Friedrich Zickwolff	Heer	Generalleutnant	Commander of the 113. Infanterie-Division	2 June 1942	—	—
Günter Zieger	Heer	Oberleutnant	Chief of the 2./Sturmgeschütz-Abteilung 600	8 February 1944	—	—
Arthur Ziegler	Heer	Oberleutnant	Regiment adjutant in Grenadier-Regiment 974 (Note: According to Scherzer as adjutant in Grenadier-Regiment 974.)	23 August 1944	—	—
Gerhard-Georg Ziegler	Heer	Oberstleutnant of the Reserves	Leader of Grenadier-Regiment 353	12 February 1944	—	—
Heinz Ziegler	Heer	Generalleutnant	Leader of a Kampfgruppe in the Stab of Heeresgruppe Afrika (Note: According to Scherzer in the Stab of the 5. Panzer-Armee and leader of a Kampfgruppe.)	16 April 1943	—	—
Joachim Ziegler+	Waffen-SS	SS-Brigadeführer and Generalmajor of the Waffen-SS	Commander of the 11. SS-Freiwilligen Panzergrenadier Division "Nordland"	5 September 1944	Awarded (848th) Oak Leaves 28 April 1945	—
Karl Ziegler	Heer	Major	Commander of the III./Jäger-Regiment 207	8 April 1943	—	—
Werner Ziegler+	Heer	Leutnant	Leader of the 2./Infanterie-Regiment 186	31 December 1941	Awarded 121st Oak Leaves 8 September 1942; 102nd Swords 23 October 1944	—
Leonhard Ziehr	Luftwaffe	Oberfeldwebel	Pilot in the 13./Transportgeschwader 1	16 December 1944	—	—
Alfred Ziemann	Heer	Oberleutnant	Chief of the 1./schwere Panzer-Jagd-Abteilung 93	9 January 1944	—	—
Ernst Ziemer+	Heer	Oberfeldwebel	Zugführer (platoon leader) of 15./Infanterie-Regiment 94 (Note: According to Scherzer as Zugführer (platoon leader) of 15.(Radfahr)/Infanterie-Regiment 94.)	14 December 1941	Awarded 317th Oak Leaves 2 November 1943	—
Otto Zierach	Luftwaffe	Oberleutnant (Note: According to Scherzer as Oberleutnant of the Reserves and Ia (operations officer) of the Luftlande-Sturm-Abteilung "Koch".)	Glider pilot in the Fallschirmjäger-Sturm-Abteilung "Koch"	15 May 1940	At the same time promoted to Hauptmann	—
Karl Zierhofer	Heer	Gefreiter	Machine gunner in the 1./Panzergrenadier-Regiment 126	4 October 1944	—	—
Erwin Zilger	Heer	Hauptmann	Chief of the 1./Panzer-Jagd-Abteilung 186	4 August 1943	—	—
Karl Zillich	Luftwaffe	Oberleutnant	Observer in the Stab of II./Kampfgeschwader 27 "Boelcke"	20 July 1944*	Died from wounds on 14 April 1944	—
Karl-Heinz Zillies	Heer	Leutnant of the Reserves	Leader of the 10./Grenadier-Regiment 8 (motorized)	11 December 1944	—	—
Erich Zillmann	Heer	Stabswachtmeister	Zugführer (platoon leader) in the 3./Sturmgeschütz-Brigade 245	8 August 1944	—	—
Karl Zimmer	Heer	Oberleutnant	Deputy leader of the II./Grenadier-Regiment 105 (Note: According to Scherzer as leader of the II./Grenadier-Regiment 105.)	18 February 1945	—	—
Richard Zimmer	Heer	Generalleutnant	Commander 17. Infanterie-Division	16 October 1944	—	—
Ernst Zimmermann	Heer	Hauptmann	Commander of the I./Grenadier-Regiment 105	21 May 1943	—	—
Fritz Zimmermann	Luftwaffe	Hauptmann	Commander of the I.(gem.)/Flaksturm-Regiment 241 (motorized)	8 August 1944*	Died from wounds on 7 June 1944	—
Hans Zimmermann	Heer	Hauptmann	Chief of the 8./Panzergrenadier-Regiment 26	22 January 1943	—	—
Herbert Zimmermann	Heer	Hauptmann	Leader of the II./Grenadier-Regiment 225	12 January 1945*	Killed in action 29 October 1944	—
Herbert Zimmermann	Heer	Hauptmann	Chief of the 1./Panzer-Regiment 36	5 April 1945	—	—
Hermann Zimmermann	Heer	Major	Commander of the II./Schützen-Regiment 3	4 September 1940	—	—
Jacob Zimmermann (Note: According to Scherzer name is spelled Jakob Zimmermann.)	Heer	Major	Leader of the Grenadier-Regiment 509	1 February 1945	—	—
Jakob Zimmermann	Heer	Hauptmann	Commander of the I./Panzergrenadier-Regiment 10	31 July 1943	—	—
Manfred Zimmermann	Heer	Hauptmann of the Reserves (Note: According to Scherzer as Hauptmann.)	Leader of the I./Grenadier-Regiment 199 "List"	14 May 1944	—	—
Oskar Zimmermann	Luftwaffe	Leutnant	Pilot in the 9./Jagdgeschwader 3 "Udet" (Note: According to Scherzer on 24 October 1944 as Staffelführer in the III./Jagdgeschwader 3 "Udet".)	29 October 1944	—	—
Otto Zimmermann	Heer	Feldwebel	Zugführer (platoon leader) in the 4.(MG)/Grenadier-Regiment 504 (Note: According to Scherzer as Zugführer (platoon leader) in the 4./Grenadier-Regiment 504.)	26 March 1944	—	—
Robert Zimmermann	Luftwaffe	Hauptmann	Commander of the I./Flak-Regiment 29 (motorized) (Note: According to Scherzer as commander of the I./Flak-Regiment 29.)	1 April 1945	—	—
Walter Zimmermann	Heer	Oberwachtmeister	Vorgeschobener Beobachter (forward observer) in the 12./Artillerie-Regiment 205	10 February 1945	—	—
Willy Zimmermann	Heer	Feldwebel	Zugführer (platoon leader) in the 6./Grenadier-Regiment 80	23 October 1944	—	
August Zingel	Waffen-SS	SS-Unterscharführer	Shock troops leader in the Kampfgruppe "Krauth" n the 15./Totenkopf-Infanterie-Regiment 1	4 October 1942	—	—
Ludwig Zinsser	Heer	Oberleutnant of the Reserves	Leader of the 8./Artillerie-Regiment 148	16 November 1944	—	—
[Dr.] Franz Zintl (Note: The brackets around the doctor title [Dr.] denotes that the academic title was attained after the Knight's Cross of the Iron Cross was awarded.)	Heer	Oberleutnant	Leader of the I./Gebirgsjäger-Regiment 206	6 July 1942	—	
Kuno Zipfel	Heer	Feldwebel	Zugführer (platoon leader) in the 1./Jäger-Regiment 56	10 September 1944	—	—
Willibald Zipfel	Luftwaffe	Feldwebel	Radio operator in the 3./Schlachtgeschwader 2 "Immelmann"	6 December 1944	—	—
Carl Ziran	Heer	Unteroffizier	Zugführer (platoon leader) in the 3./Grenadier-Regiment 461	29 November 1944	—	—
Wilhelm Zischka	Heer	Wachtmeister	Vorgeschobener Beobachter (forward observer) in the 6./Artillerie-Regiment 41 (motorized)	23 October 1944	—	—
Kurt Zitzen	Heer	Oberleutnant of the Reserves	Chief of the 2./Sturmgeschütz-Abteilung 177	4 August 1943	—	—
Alois Zmugg	Heer	Unteroffizier	In the 3./Schützen-Regiment 114	18 October 1941	—	—
Horst Zobel	Heer	Hauptmann	Commander of the Panzer-Abteilung in the Panzer-Division "Müncheberg" (Note: According to Scherzer as commander of Panzer-Abteilung "Müncheberg".)	14 April 1945	—	—
Heinz Zöllner	Luftwaffe	Hauptmann	Staffelkapitän of the 6./Kampfgeschwader 53 "Legion Condor"	5 April 1944	—	—
Erhard Zoll	Heer	Hauptmann of the Reserves	Chief of the 14.(Panzerjäger)/Grenadier-Regiment 437 (Note: According to Scherzer as 14./Grenadier-Regiment 437.)	18 January 1945	—	—
Gerhard Zonewitz	Heer	Oberleutnant	Chief of the 2./Infanterie-Regiment 151	4 December 1941	—	—
Gerhard Zoppoth? (Note: Gerhard Zoppoth's nomination was submitted to the Heerespersonalamt (HPA—Army Staff Office) on 15 April 1945. Major Joachim Domaschk approved the nomination on 16 April 1945. The book of "Verliehene Ritterkreuze" (Awarded Knight Crosses) contains an entry under Nr. 5142 "Knight's Cross yes" and another entry "deferred". The nomination was forwarded to General Wilhelm Burgdorf in Berlin for approval by the Führer. The file contains no further evidence of the approval or presentation of the award. The registry containing the approved or rejected nominations or deferred nominations contains his file card. According to the Association of Knight's Cross Recipients (AKCR) the award was presented in accordance with the Dönitz-decree. This is illegal according to the Deutsche Dienststelle (WASt) and lacks legal justification. The presentation date was assigned by Fellgiebel. Zoppoth is a member of the AKCR.)	Heer	Leutnant	Leader of the 6./Grenadier-Regiment 732	9 May 1945	—	—
Eduard Zorn+	Heer	Oberst im Generalstab (in the General Staff)	Leader of the 189. Infanterie-Division	25 December 1944	Awarded 739th Oak Leaves 16 February 1945	—
Gerhard Zorn	Heer	Major	Commander of Panzer-Jäger-Abteilung 159	28 March 1945	—	—
Hans Zorn+	Heer	Generalmajor	Commander of the 20. Infanterie-Division (motorized)	27 July 1941	Awarded 291st Oak Leaves 3 September 1943	
Paul Zorner+	Luftwaffe	Hauptmann	Staffelkapitän of the 8./Nachtjagdgeschwader 3	9 June 1944	Awarded 588th Oak Leaves 17 September 1944	—
Heinrich Zubrod	Heer	Leutnant of the Reserves	Company leader in the Grenadier-Regiment 1213	18 January 1945	—	—
Hermann Zühlsdorff	Heer	Oberfeldwebel	Zugführer (platoon leader) in the 1./Infanterie-Regiment 94	9 January 1942	—	—
Erich Zürn	Kriegsmarine	Oberleutnant (Ing.)	Chief engineer on U-48	23 April 1941	—	—
Rudolf Zürn	Heer	Major	Commander of the II./Infanterie-Regiment 65	16 June 1940	—	—
Hermann Zürner	Heer	Oberleutnant of the Reserves	Leader of the II./Panzergrenadier-Regiment 10	28 December 1944	—	—
Günter Zugehör	Heer	Hauptmann	Commander of the II./Artillerie-Regiment 19 (motorized)	12 September 1941	—	—
Hugo Zumfelde	Heer	Hauptmann of the Reserves	Commander of the II./Grenadier-Regiment 546	9 December 1944	—	—
Alfred Zurin? (Note: Alfred Zurin's nomination was submitted to the Heerespersonalamt (HPA—Army Staff Office) on 16 April 1945. Major Joachim Domaschk approved the nomination on 17 April 1945 and forwarded to Wilhelm Burgdorf in Berlin as a HPA nomination carrying the id Nr. 5076 on 18 April. Neither the registry of contemporary nominations, nor the book "Verliehene Ritterkreuze" (Awarded Knight Crosses), nor the original nominations contains any evidence of the approval or of the presentation of the award. The nomination remained unprocessed at the end of the war. According to the Association of Knight's Cross Recipients (AKCR) the award was presented in accordance with the Dönitz-decree. This is illegal according to the Deutsche Dienststelle (WASt) and lacks legal justification. The presentation date was assigned by Fellgiebel.)	Heer	Leutnant	Leader of the 3./Grenadier-Regiment 189	9 May 1945	—	—
Walter Zurmöhle	Luftwaffe	Oberleutnant of the Reserves	Chief of the 1./Pionier-Bataillon 6 (L)	5 April 1944	—	—
Eugen-Ludwig Zweigart	Luftwaffe	Oberfeldwebel	Pilot in the 5./Jagdgeschwader 54	22 January 1943	—	—
Franz Zwer	Heer	Oberfeldwebel	Zugführer (platoon leader) in the 6./Grenadier-Regiment 530 (Note: According to Scherzer as Zugführer (platoon leader) in the 6./Grenadier-Regiment 53.)	6 April 1944	—	—
Josef Zwernemann+	Luftwaffe	Oberfeldwebel	Pilot in 7./Jagdgeschwader 52	23 June 1942	Awarded 141st Oak Leaves 31 October 1942	Man in uniform, with order around his neck
Rudi Zwesken	Luftwaffe	Oberfeldwebel	Pilot in the 6./Jagdgeschwader 300	21 March 1945	—	—
Hans Zwickenpflug	Heer	Major	Commander of the II./Gebirgsjäger-Regiment 100	5 April 1945	—	—
Heinrich Zwipf	Luftwaffe	Hauptmann	Staffelkapitän of the 3./Sturzkampfgeschwader 77	31 December 1943	—	—
Felix Zymalkowski	Kriegsmarine	Korvettenkapitän	Chief of the 8. Schnellbootflottille	10 April 1945	—	—
