= List of Knight's Cross of the Iron Cross with Oak Leaves recipients (1940–1941) =

The Knight's Cross of the Iron Cross (German: Ritterkreuz des Eisernen Kreuzes) and its variants were the highest awards in the military and paramilitary forces of Nazi Germany during World War II. The decoration was awarded for a wide range of reasons and across all ranks, from a senior commander for skilled leadership of his troops in battle to a low-ranking soldier for a single act of extreme gallantry. The Knight's Cross of the Iron Cross with Oak Leaves (Ritterkreuz des Eisernen Kreuzes mit Eichenlaub) was introduced on 3 June 1940 to further distinguish those who had already received the Knight's Cross of the Iron Cross and who continued to show merit in combat bravery or military success. A total of 7 awards were made in 1940; 50 in 1941; 111 in 1942; 192 in 1943; 328 in 1944, and 194 in 1945, giving a total of 882 recipients—excluding the 8 foreign recipients of the award.

The number of 882 Oak Leaves recipients is based on the analysis and acceptance of the order commission of the Association of Knight's Cross Recipients (AKCR). However, author Veit Scherzer has challenged the validity of 27 of these listings. With the exception of Hermann Fegelein, all of the disputed recipients had received the award in 1945, when the deteriorating situation during the final days of World War II in Germany left a number of nominations incomplete and pending in various stages of the approval process. Fegelein received the Oak Leaves in 1942, but was sentenced to death by Adolf Hitler and executed by SS-Gruppenführer Johann Rattenhuber's Reichssicherheitsdienst (RSD) on 28 April 1945 after a court-martial led by SS-Brigadeführer and Generalmajor of the Waffen-SS Wilhelm Mohnke. The sentence was carried out the same day. The death sentence, according to German law, resulted in the loss of all orders and honorary signs.

== Background ==
The Knight's Cross of the Iron Cross and its higher grades were based on four separate enactments. The first enactment, Reichsgesetzblatt I S. 1573 of 1 September 1939 instituted the Iron Cross (Eisernes Kreuz), the Knight's Cross of the Iron Cross and the Grand Cross of the Iron Cross (Großkreuz des Eisernen Kreuzes). Article 2 of the enactment mandated that the award of a higher class be preceded by the award of all preceding classes. As the war progressed, some of the recipients of the Knight's Cross distinguished themselves further and a higher grade, the Oak Leaves to the Knight's Cross of the Iron Cross, was instituted. The Oak Leaves, as they were commonly referred to, were based on the enactment Reichsgesetzblatt I S. 849 of 3 June 1940. In 1941, two higher grades of the Knight's Cross were instituted. The enactment Reichsgesetzblatt I S. 613 of 28 September 1941 introduced the Knight's Cross of the Iron Cross with Oak Leaves and Swords (Ritterkreuz des Eisernen Kreuzes mit Eichenlaub und Schwertern) and the Knight's Cross of the Iron Cross with Oak Leaves, Swords and Diamonds (Ritterkreuz des Eisernen Kreuzes mit Eichenlaub, Schwertern und Brillanten). At the end of 1944 the final grade, the Knight's Cross of the Iron Cross with Golden Oak Leaves, Swords, and Diamonds (Ritterkreuz des Eisernen Kreuzes mit goldenem Eichenlaub, Schwertern und Brillanten), based on the enactment Reichsgesetzblatt 1945 I S. 11 of 29 December 1944, became the final variant of the Knight's Cross authorized.

== Recipients ==
Knight's Cross of the Iron Cross with Oak Leaves
Year	Number of presentations	Posthumous presentations
1940	7	0
1941	50	3
1942	111	7
1943	192	17
1944	328	46
1945	194	19

The Oberkommando der Wehrmacht (OKW—Supreme Command of the Armed Forces) kept separate Knight's Cross lists, one for each of the three military branches, Heer (Army), Kriegsmarine (Navy), Luftwaffe (Air force) and for the Waffen-SS. Within each of these lists a unique sequential number was assigned to each recipient. The same numbering paradigm was applied to the higher grades of the Knight's Cross, one list per grade. The recipients are ordered chronologically and numbered by the official sequential number assigned by the OKW. The rank listed is the recipient's rank at the time the Knight's Cross with Oak Leaves was awarded.

This along with the + (plus) indicates that a higher grade of Knight's Cross was awarded as well.
This along with the * (asterisk), indicates that the Knight's Cross with Oak Leaves was awarded posthumously.

=== Recipients of 1940 ===
Number	Name	Service	Rank	Role and unit (Note: For an explanation of the various naming schemes used by the Luftwaffe, Heer, Kriegsmarine and Waffen-SS refer to nomenclature used by the Wehrmacht and Waffen-SS.)	Date of award	Notes	Image
1	Eduard Dietl+	Heer	Generalleutnant	Commanding general of Gebirgskorps Norwegen	19 July 1940	Awarded 72nd Swords 1 July 1944. At the same time promoted to General der Infanterie, later General der Gebirgstruppen	The head and shoulders of an elderly man, shown from the front. He wears a field cap and a military uniform displaying various military decorations on breast pockets, right upper sleeve, and an Iron Cross displayed at the front of his shirt collar. His facial expression is a determined and confident smile; his eyes look into the camera.
2	Werner Mölders+	Luftwaffe	Major	Geschwaderkommodore of Jagdgeschwader 51	21 September 1940	Awarded 2nd Swords 22 June 1941; 1st Diamonds 15 July 1941 (Note: According to Scherzer 1st Diamonds on 16 July 1941.)	The head and shoulders of a young man, shown in semi-profile. He wears a field cap and a pilot's leather jacket with a fur collar, with an Iron Cross displayed at the front of his shirt collar. His hair is dark and short, his nose is long and straight, and his facial expression is a determined and confident smile; his eyes gaze into the distance.
3	Adolf Galland+	Luftwaffe	Major	Geschwaderkommodore of Jagdgeschwader 26 "Schlageter"	24 September 1940	Awarded 1st Swords 21 June 1941; 2nd Diamonds 28 January 1942	The head and shoulders of a young man, shown in semi-profile. He wears a military uniform with various military above his left breast pocket and an Iron Cross displayed at the front of his shirt collar. On his upper lip is a moustache, his hair is dark and short and combed back, his facial expression is a determined and confident smile; his eyes gaze into the distance.
4	Helmut Wick	Luftwaffe	Hauptmann	Gruppenkommandeur of the I./Jagdgeschwader 2 "Richthofen"	6 October 1940 (Note: According to Scherzer on 25 October 1940.)	—	The head and shoulders of a young man. He wears a military uniform, an Iron Cross displayed at the front of his shirt collar and breast pocket.
5	Günther Prien	Kriegsmarine	Kapitänleutnant	Commander of U-47	20 October 1940	—	A smiling Prien is seen on deck, wearing his navy uniform.
6	Otto Kretschmer+	Kriegsmarine	Kapitänleutnant	Commander of U-99	4 November 1940	Awarded 5th Swords 26 December 1941	The head and shoulders of a smiling young man. He wears casual army fatigues and is unshaven.
7	Joachim Schepke	Kriegsmarine	Kapitänleutnant	Commander of U-100	1 December 1940	—	

=== Recipients of 1941 ===
Number	Name	Service	Rank	Role and unit	Date of award	Notes	Image
8	Martin Harlinghausen	Luftwaffe	Oberstleutnant	Chief of the general staff of the X. Fliegerkorps	30 January 1941	—	
9	Walter Oesau+	Luftwaffe	Hauptmann	Gruppenkommandeur of the III./Jagdgeschwader 3	6 February 1941	Awarded 3rd Swords 15 July 1941 (Note: According to Scherzer on 16 July 1941.)	
10	Erwin Rommel+	Heer	Generalleutnant (Note: According to Scherzer as Generalmajor.)	Commander of the 7. Panzer-Division	20 March 1941	Awarded 6th Swords 20 January 1942; 6th Diamonds 11 March 1943	The head and shoulders of an elderly man, shown in semi-profile. He wears a peaked cap and a military uniform with an Eagle above his right and various military decorations above left breast pocket, and an Iron Cross displayed at the front of his shirt collar. His facial expression is a determined; his eyes are looking into the distance to the left of the camera.
11	Hermann-Friedrich Joppien	Luftwaffe	Hauptmann	Gruppenkommandeur of the I./Jagdgeschwader 51	23 April 1941	—	
12	Joachim Müncheberg+	Luftwaffe	Oberleutnant	Staffelkapitän of the 7./Jagdgeschwader 26 "Schlageter"	7 May 1941	Awarded 19th Swords 9 September 1942	
13	Heinrich Liebe	Kriegsmarine	Kapitänleutnant	Commander of U-38	10 June 1941	At the same time promoted to Korvettenkapitän	
14	Engelbert Endrass	Kriegsmarine	Oberleutnant zur See (Note: According to Scherzer as Kapitänleutnant.)	Commander of U-46	10 June 1941	—	
15	Herbert Schultze	Kriegsmarine	Kapitänleutnant	Commander of U-48	12 June 1941	—	The head and shoulders of a young man, shown in semi-profile. He wears a greatcoat and his Iron Cross is visible at the front of his shirt collar. He wears a determined expression.
16	Herbert Ihlefeld+	Luftwaffe	Hauptmann	Gruppenkommandeur of the I./Jagdgeschwader 77	27 June 1941	Awarded 9th Swords 24 April 1942	
17	Wilhelm Balthasar	Luftwaffe	Hauptmann	Geschwaderkommodore of Jagdgeschwader 2 "Richthofen"	2 July 1941	—	
18	Siegfried Schnell	Luftwaffe	Leutnant (Note: According to Scherzer as Leutnant of the Reserves and Staffelkapitän of the 9./Jagdgeschwader 2 "Richthofen".)	Pilot in the 9./Jagdgeschwader 2 "Richthofen"	9 July 1941	—	
19	Rudolf Schmidt	Heer	General der Panzertruppe	Commanding general of the XXXIX. Armeekorps (motorized)	10 July 1941	—	The head and shoulders of an elderly man, shown from the front. He wears a military uniform with an Iron Cross displayed at the front of his collar. His hair is parted, combed back and appears either dark or grey, his facial expression is a determined and grim; his eyes are looking into the camera.
20	Werner Baumbach+	Luftwaffe	Oberleutnant	Pilot in the 4./Kampfgeschwader 30	14 July 1941	Awarded 16th Swords 17 August 1942 (Note: According to Scherzer on 16 August 1942.)	
21	Oskar Dinort	Luftwaffe	Oberstleutnant	Geschwaderkommodore of Sturzkampfgeschwader 2 "Immelmann"	14 July 1941	—	
22	Walter Storp	Luftwaffe	Major	Geschwaderkommodore of Schnellkampfgeschwader 210	14 July 1941	—	
23	Viktor Schütze	Kriegsmarine	Korvettenkapitän	Commander of U-103	14 July 1941	—	
24	Heinz Guderian	Heer	Generaloberst	Commander-in-chief of Panzergruppe 2	17 July 1941	—	Guderian is seen in the field. He wears a military uniform and an Iron Cross displayed at the front. He is wearing a greatcoat and has binoculars around his neck.
25	Hermann Hoth+	Heer	Generaloberst	Commander-in-chief of Panzergruppe 3	17 July 1941	Awarded 35th Swords 15 September 1943	A man in military uniform wearing an Iron Cross at his neck.
26	Dipl.-Ing. Wolfram Freiherr von Richthofen	Luftwaffe	General der Flieger	Commanding general of the VIII. Fliegerkorps	17 July 1941	—	The head and shoulders of a man, shown in semi-profile. He wears a peaked cap and a military uniform with an Eagle above his right breast pocket, and an Iron Cross displayed at the front of his white shirt collar.
27	Günther Lützow+	Luftwaffe	Major	Geschwaderkommodore of Jagdgeschwader 3	20 July 1941	Awarded 4th Swords 11 October 1941	The head and shoulders of a young man, shown in semi-profile. He wears a military uniform with an Iron Cross displayed at the front of his shirt collar. His hair isshort and combed to his right, his nose is short, and his facial expression is determined; looking into the camera.
28	Josef Priller+	Luftwaffe	Oberleutnant	Staffelkapitän of the 1./Jagdgeschwader 26 "Schlageter"	20 July 1941	Awarded 73rd Swords 2 July 1944	
29	Günther Freiherr von Maltzahn	Luftwaffe	Major	Geschwaderkommodore of Jagdgeschwader 53	24 July 1941	—	
30	Horst Niemack+	Heer	Rittmeister	Commander of Divisions-Aufklärungs-Abteilung 5	10 August 1941	Awarded 69th Swords 4 June 1944	
31	Heinrich Bär+	Luftwaffe	Leutnant (Note: According to Scherzer as Leutnant of the Reserves.)	Pilot in the 1./Jagdgeschwader 51	14 August 1941	Awarded 7th Swords 16 February 1942	
32	Hans Hahn	Luftwaffe	Hauptmann	Gruppenkommandeur of the III./Jagdgeschwader 2 "Richthofen"	14 August 1941	—	
33	Hans Philipp+	Luftwaffe	Oberleutnant	Staffelkapitän of the 4./Jagdgeschwader 54	24 August 1941	Awarded 8th Swords 12 March 1942	
34	Ludwig Crüwell	Heer	Generalleutnant	Commander of the 11. Panzer-Division	1 September 1941	—	Crüwell is seen in profile. He wears a military uniform, along with a cap for desert warfare. His Iron Cross displayed at the front of his shirt collar.
35	Karl-Gottfried Nordmann	Luftwaffe	Oberleutnant	Staffelkapitän of the 12./Jagdgeschwader 51	16 September 1941	—	The head and shoulders of a young man, shown in semi-profile. He wears a peaked cap and a military uniform with an Eagle above his right and a military decorations above left breast pocket, and an Iron Cross displayed at the front of his shirt collar. His facial expression is a determined; his eyes are looking into the distance to the left of the camera.
36	Heinrich Hoffmann	Luftwaffe	Oberfeldwebel	Pilot in the 12./Jagdgeschwader 51	19 October 1941*	Killed in action 3 October 1941	—
37	Kurt-Jürgen Freiherr von Lützow	Heer	Oberst	Commander of Infanterie-Regiment 89	21 October 1941	—	—
38	Gordon Gollob+	Luftwaffe	Hauptmann	Gruppenkommandeur of the II./Jagdgeschwader 3	26 October 1941 (Note: According to Scherzer on 25 October 1941.)	Awarded 13th Swords 23 June 1942; 3rd Diamonds 30 August 1942	The head a man, shown from the front. He wears a military uniform, a white shirt with an Iron Cross displayed at the front of his shirt collar. His hair appears dark and is combed back, his facial expression is a determined; his eyes are looking into the camera.
39	Erbo Graf von Kageneck	Luftwaffe	Oberleutnant	Staffelkapitän of the 9./Jagdgeschwader 27	26 October 1941	—	
40	Ernst-Felix Krüder	Kriegsmarine	Kapitän zur See	Commander of Hilfskreuzer Pinguin (HSK-5)	15 November 1941*	Killed in action 8 May 1941	—
41	Josef Dietrich+	Waffen-SS	SS-Obergruppenführer and General of the Waffen-SS	Commander of SS-Division "Leibstandarte SS Adolf Hitler" (motorized)	31 December 1941	Awarded 26th Swords 14 March 1943; 16th Diamonds 6 August 1944	A black and white photograph of a man in semi profile wearing a military uniform and neck order, in shape of an Iron Cross. He has short, thinning hair and a determined facial expression.
42	Heinrich Eberbach	Heer	Oberst	Commander of the 5. Panzer-Brigade	31 December 1941	—	The head a man, shown from the front looking slightly to his left. He wears a black military uniform, a dark shirt with an Iron Cross displayed at the front of his shirt collar. On the collar of his uniform are two skull insignias. His hair appears dark and is combed back, his nose is scared, his facial expression is a determined.
43	Franz Scheidies	Heer	Oberst	Commander of Infanterie-Regiment 22	31 December 1941	—	—
44	Ernst-Georg Buchterkirch	Heer	Oberleutnant	Chief of the 2./Panzer-Regiment 6	31 December 1941	—	
45	Bernhard Rogge	Kriegsmarine	Kapitän zur See	Commander of Hilfskreuzer Atlantis (HSK-2)	31 December 1941	—	
46	Dietrich Peltz+	Luftwaffe	Hauptmann	Gruppenkommandeur of the II./Kampfgeschwader 77	31 December 1941	Awarded 31st Swords 23 July 1943	
47	Adelbert Schulz+	Heer	Hauptmann	Commander of the I./Panzer-Regiment 25	31 December 1941	Awarded 33rd Swords 6 August 1943; 9th Diamonds 14 December 1943	The head and shoulders of an elderly man, shown in partial profile. He wears a field cap and a military uniform and an Iron Cross displayed at the front of his camouflage shirt collar.
48	Dr. Josef-Franz Eckinger	Heer	Major	Commander of the I./Schützen-Regiment 113	31 December 1941*	Killed in action 17 October 1941	
49	Günther Hoffmann-Schönborn	Heer	Major	Commander of Sturmgeschütz-Abteilung 191	31 December 1941	—	—
50	Karl Eibl+	Heer	Oberst	Commander of Infanterie-Regiment 132	31 December 1941	Awarded 21st Swords 19 December 1942	—
51	Heinrich Lehmann-Willenbrock	Kriegsmarine	Kapitänleutnant	Commander of U-96	31 December 1941	—	
52	Otto Weiß	Luftwaffe	Major	Gruppenkommandeur of the II.(Schlacht)/Lehrgeschwader 2	31 December 1941	—	The head and shoulders of a young man, shown from the front. He wears a military uniform, with an Iron Cross displayed at the front of his white shirt collar. His facial expression is a determined and a grim smile; his eyes are looking to the left of the camera.
53	Georg Freiherr von Boeselager+	Heer	Rittmeister	Chief of the 1./Divisions-Aufklärungs-Abteilung 6	31 December 1941	Awarded 114th Swords 28 November 1944	—
54	Walther von Seydlitz-Kurzbach	Heer	Generalmajor	Commander of the 12. Infanterie-Division	31 December 1941	—	
55	Josef Harpe+	Heer	Generalmajor	Commander of the 12. Panzer-Division	31 December 1941	Awarded 36th Swords 15 September 1943	The head of an elderly man, shown from the front. He wears a peaked cap and a military uniform. His facial expression is a determined and confident smile; his eyes looks to the right of the camera.
56	Reinhard Suhren+	Kriegsmarine	Oberleutnant zur See	Commander of U-564	31 December 1941	Awarded 18th Swords 1 September 1942	—
57	Hubertus Hitschhold	Luftwaffe	Major	Gruppenkommandeur of the I./Sturzkampfgeschwader 2 "Immelmann"	31 December 1941	—	
