= List of Knight's Cross of the Iron Cross recipients (U) =

The Knight's Cross of the Iron Cross (German: Ritterkreuz des Eisernen Kreuzes) and its variants were the highest awards in the military and paramilitary forces of Nazi Germany during World War II. The Knight's Cross of the Iron Cross was awarded for a wide range of reasons and across all ranks, from a senior commander for skilled leadership of his troops in battle to a low-ranking soldier for a single act of extreme gallantry. A total of 7,321 awards were made between its first presentation on 30 September 1939 and its last bestowal on 17 June 1945. (Note: Großadmiral and President of Germany Karl Dönitz, Hitler's successor as Head of State (Staatsoberhaupt) and Supreme Commander of the Armed Forces, had ordered the cessation of all promotions and awards as of 11 May 1945 (Dönitz-decree). Consequently the last Knight's Cross awarded to Oberleutnant zur See of the Reserves Georg-Wolfgang Feller on 17 June 1945 must therefore be considered a de facto but not de jure hand-out.) This number is based on the analysis and acceptance of the order commission of the Association of Knight's Cross Recipients (AKCR). Presentations were made to members of the three military branches of the Wehrmacht—the Heer (Army), Kriegsmarine (Navy) and Luftwaffe (Air Force)—as well as the Waffen-SS, the Reichsarbeitsdienst (RAD—Reich Labour Service) and the Volkssturm (German national militia). There were also 43 recipients in the military forces of allies of the Third Reich.

These recipients are listed in the 1986 edition of Walther-Peer Fellgiebel's book, Die Träger des Ritterkreuzes des Eisernen Kreuzes 1939–1945 — The Bearers of the Knight's Cross of the Iron Cross 1939–1945. Fellgiebel was the former chairman and head of the order commission of the AKCR. In 1996, the second edition of this book was published with an addendum delisting 11 of these original recipients. Author Veit Scherzer has cast doubt on a further 193 of these listings. The majority of the disputed recipients had received the award in 1945, when the deteriorating situation of Germany in the final days of World War II in Europe left a number of nominations incomplete and pending in various stages of the approval process.

Listed here are the 32 Knight's Cross recipients whose last name starts with "U". Scherzer has challenged the validity of one listing. The recipients are ordered alphabetically by last name. The rank listed is the recipient's rank at the time the Knight's Cross was awarded.

== Background ==
The Knight's Cross of the Iron Cross and its higher grades were based on four separate enactments. The first enactment, Reichsgesetzblatt I S. 1573 of 1 September 1939 instituted the Iron Cross (Eisernes Kreuz), the Knight's Cross of the Iron Cross and the Grand Cross of the Iron Cross (Großkreuz des Eisernen Kreuzes). Article 2 of the enactment mandated that the award of a higher class be preceded by the award of all preceding classes. As the war progressed, some of the recipients of the Knight's Cross distinguished themselves further and a higher grade, the Knight's Cross of the Iron Cross with Oak Leaves (Ritterkreuz des Eisernen Kreuzes mit Eichenlaub), was instituted. The Oak Leaves, as they were commonly referred to, were based on the enactment Reichsgesetzblatt I S. 849 of 3 June 1940. In 1941, two higher grades of the Knight's Cross were instituted. The enactment Reichsgesetzblatt I S. 613 of 28 September 1941 introduced the Knight's Cross of the Iron Cross with Oak Leaves and Swords (Ritterkreuz des Eisernen Kreuzes mit Eichenlaub und Schwertern) and the Knight's Cross of the Iron Cross with Oak Leaves, Swords and Diamonds (Ritterkreuz des Eisernen Kreuzes mit Eichenlaub, Schwertern und Brillanten). At the end of 1944 the final grade, the Knight's Cross of the Iron Cross with Golden Oak Leaves, Swords, and Diamonds (Ritterkreuz des Eisernen Kreuzes mit goldenem Eichenlaub, Schwertern und Brillanten), based on the enactment Reichsgesetzblatt 1945 I S. 11 of 29 December 1944, became the final variant of the Knight's Cross authorized.

== Recipients ==
Knight's Cross of the Iron Cross (U)
Service	Number of presentations	Posthumous presentations
Heer	23	1
Kriegsmarine	0	0
Luftwaffe	7	0
Waffen-SS	2	0

The Oberkommando der Wehrmacht (Supreme Command of the Armed Forces) kept separate Knight's Cross lists for the Heer (Army), Kriegsmarine (Navy), Luftwaffe (Air Force) and Waffen-SS. Within each of these lists a unique sequential number was assigned to each recipient. The same numbering paradigm was applied to the higher grades of the Knight's Cross, one list per grade. Of the 32 awards made to servicemen whose last name starts with "U", four were later awarded the Knight's Cross of the Iron Cross with Oak Leaves and one presentation was made posthumously. Heer members received 23 of the medals, none went to the Kriegsmarine, seven to the Luftwaffe, and two to the Waffen-SS.

This along with the + (plus) indicates that a higher grade of Knight's Cross was awarded as well.
This along with the * (asterisk) indicates that the Knight's Cross was awarded posthumously.
This along with the ? (question mark) indicates that author Veit Scherzer has expressed doubt regarding the veracity and formal correctness of the listing.

Name	Service	Rank	Role and unit (Note: For an explanation of the various naming schemes used by the Luftwaffe, Heer, Kriegsmarine and Waffen-SS refer to nomenclature used by the Wehrmacht and Waffen-SS.)	Date of award	Notes	Image
Kurt Ubben+	Luftwaffe	Oberleutnant	Staffelkapitän of the 8./Jagdgeschwader 77	4 September 1941	Awarded 80th Oak Leaves 12 March 1942	—
Otto Ude	Heer	Oberwachtmeister	Zugführer (platoon leader) in the 1./Radfahr-Abteilung 30	15 January 1943	—	—
Dr.-Ing. h.c. Ernst Udet	Luftwaffe	General der Flieger	Generalluftzeugmeister im OKL (Note: According to Scherzer as Generalluftzeugmeister and chief of the planning office of the Luftwaffe/Reichsluftfahrtministerium, at the same time general Inspector of Fighters.)	4 July 1940	—	The head and upper body of a man wearing a military uniform, peaked cap and various military decorations.
Klaus Uebe	Luftwaffe	Generalmajor	Chief of the general staff of Luftflotte 2 (Note: According to Scherzer as chief of the general staff of Luftflotte 1.)	9 June 1944	—	—
Friedrich Überschaar	Heer	Hauptmann	Leader of the III./Gebirgsjäger-Regiment 91	9 December 1944	—	—
Eugen Ueltzhöfer	Heer	Gefreiter	Driver in the 3./Artillerie-Lehr-Regiment 5 (motorized) in the fortress Schneidemühl	12 February 1945	—	—
Hans Uhde	Heer	Oberleutnant of the Reserves	Leader of the 11./Grenadier-Regiment 424	15 January 1943	—	—
[Dr.] Hans Uhl (Note: The brackets around the doctor title [Dr.] denotes that the academic title was attained after the Knight's Cross of the Iron Cross was awarded.)	Heer	Hauptmann	Leader of the II./Grenadier-Regiment 430	22 January 1943	—	—
Rudolf Uhl	Heer	Leutnant	Adjudant of the II./Gebirgsjäger-Regiment 141	5 November 1944	—	—
Alexander Uhlig	Luftwaffe	Oberfeldwebel of the Reserves	Zugführer (platoon leader) in the 16./Fallschirmjäger-Regiment 6	29 October 1944	—	—
[Dr.] Gottfried Uhlig	Heer	Hauptmann	Commander of the II./Grenadier-Regiment 43	26 November 1944	—	—
Martin Uhlig	Heer	Hauptmann	Commander of schwere Panzer-Jäger-Abteilung 88	11 March 1945	—	—
Franz Uhren	Heer	Feldwebel	Zugführer (platoon leader) in the 13./Grenadier-Regiment 366	28 October 1944	—	—
Max Ulich	Heer	Oberst	Commander of Grenadier-Regiment 15 (motorized)	2 November 1943	—	—
Karl Ullrich+	Waffen-SS	SS-Sturmbannführer	Commander of SS-Pionier-Bataillon 3 "Totenkopf"	19 February 1942	Awarded 480th Oak Leaves 14 May 1944	—
Ulrich Ulms	Heer	Oberstleutnant im Generalstab (in the General Staff)	Chief of the general staff Korpsgruppe "von Gottberg" (XII. SS-Armeekorps)	12 August 1944	—	—
Emil Ulrich	Heer	Unteroffizier	Group leader in the 5./Grenadier-Regiment "Feldherrnhalle"	7 February 1945	—	—
Willibald Unfried	Heer	Gefreiter	1st machine gunner in the 9./Grenadier-Regiment 213	4 March 1942	—	—
Heinz Unger	Heer	Hauptmann	Chief of the 1./Schützen-Regiment 10	4 September 1941	—	—
Willy Unger	Luftwaffe	Fahnenjunker-Feldwebel	Pilot in the IV.(Sturm)/Jagdgeschwader 3 "Udet" (Note: According to Scherzer in the 15.(Sturm)/Jagdgeschwader 3 "Udet".)	23 October 1944	—	
Georg von Unold	Heer	Oberst im Generalstab (in the General Staff)	Deputy leader of the 227. Infanterie-Division	20 March 1945	—	—
Heinz Unrau? (Note: No evidence of the award can be found in the German Federal Archives. Ernst Obermaier wrote to Walther-Peer Fellgiebel on 16 April 1983: "Mr. Unrau was definitely nominated and had been informally told that he had received the award by the end of the war. He himself does not hold any written evidence. I still list him under the "nominated" recipients." The date is an assumption of the Association of Knight's Cross Recipients (AKCR).)	Luftwaffe	Major	Gruppenkommandeur of the I./Kampfgeschwader 51	1 May 1945	—	—
Martin Unrein+	Heer	Oberst	Commander of Panzergrenadier-Regiment 4	10 September 1943	Awarded 515th Oak Leaves 26 June 1944	—
Kurt Unruh	Luftwaffe	Oberleutnant	Pilot in the 2./Kampfgeschwader 53 "Legion Condor"	29 February 1944	—	—
Johannes Unruhe	Heer	Oberfeldwebel	Zugführer (platoon leader) in the 2./Panzer-Aufklärungs-Abteilung 12	28 March 1945	—	—
Horst von Usedom+	Heer	Major	Commander of Kradschützen-Bataillon 61	31 December 1941	Awarded 809th Oak Leaves 28 March 1945	—
Christian Usinger	Heer	Generalmajor	Leader of the 81. Infanterie-Division	15 September 1944	—	—
Horst Freiherr von Uslar-Gleichen	Heer	Major	Commander of Panzer-Abteilung 190	11 July 1944	—	—
Richard Utgenannt	Waffen-SS	SS-Hauptscharführer	Chief of the 3./SS-Sturmgeschütz-Abteilung 4	16 November 1944	—	—
Konrad Uthe	Heer	Major	Commander of Panzergrenadier-Lehr-Regiment 901	12 August 1944*	Killed in action 25 June 1944	—
Ewald Utta	Heer	Leutnant of the Reserves	Leader of the 5./Grenadier-Regiment 944	23 October 1944	—	—
Willibald Utz	Heer	Oberst	Commander of Gebirgsjäger-Regiment 100	21 June 1941	—	—
