= Isachsen (disambiguation) =

Isachsen was an Arctic weather station.

Isachsen may also refer to:

- Andreas Isachsen (1829–1903), Norwegian actor and playwright
- Gunnar Isachsen (1868–1939), Norwegian military officer and polar scientist
- Herbert Isachsen, a Knight's Cross of the Iron Cross
