= List of Knight's Cross of the Iron Cross recipients (I) =

The Knight's Cross of the Iron Cross (German: Ritterkreuz des Eisernen Kreuzes) and its variants were the highest awards in the military and paramilitary forces of Nazi Germany during World War II. The Knight's Cross of the Iron Cross was awarded for a wide range of reasons and across all ranks, from a senior commander for skilled leadership of his troops in battle to a low-ranking soldier for a single act of extreme gallantry. A total of 7,321 awards were made between its first presentation on 30 September 1939 and its last bestowal on 17 June 1945. (Note: Großadmiral and President of Germany Karl Dönitz, Hitler's successor as Head of State (Staatsoberhaupt) and Supreme Commander of the Armed Forces, had ordered the cessation of all promotions and awards as of 11 May 1945 (Dönitz-decree). Consequently the last Knight's Cross awarded to Oberleutnant zur See of the Reserves Georg-Wolfgang Feller on 17 June 1945 must therefore be considered a de facto but not de jure hand-out.) This number is based on the analysis and acceptance of the order commission of the Association of Knight's Cross Recipients (AKCR). Presentations were made to members of the three military branches of the Wehrmacht—the Heer (Army), Kriegsmarine (Navy) and Luftwaffe (Air Force)—as well as the Waffen-SS, the Reichsarbeitsdienst (RAD—Reich Labour Service) and the Volkssturm (German national militia). There were also 43 recipients in the military forces of allies of the Third Reich.

These recipients are listed in the 1986 edition of Walther-Peer Fellgiebel's book, Die Träger des Ritterkreuzes des Eisernen Kreuzes 1939–1945 — The Bearers of the Knight's Cross of the Iron Cross 1939–1945. Fellgiebel was the former chairman and head of the order commission of the AKCR. In 1996, the second edition of this book was published with an addendum delisting 11 of these original recipients. Author Veit Scherzer has cast doubt on a further 193 of these listings. The majority of the disputed recipients had received the award in 1945, when the deteriorating situation of Germany in the final days of World War II in Europe left a number of nominations incomplete and pending in various stages of the approval process.

Listed here are the 26 Knight's Cross recipients whose last names start with "I", ordered alphabetically. The rank listed is the recipient's rank at the time the Knight's Cross was awarded.

== Background ==
The Knight's Cross of the Iron Cross and its higher grades were based on four separate enactments. The first enactment, Reichsgesetzblatt I S. 1573 of 1 September 1939 instituted the Iron Cross (Eisernes Kreuz), the Knight's Cross of the Iron Cross and the Grand Cross of the Iron Cross (Großkreuz des Eisernen Kreuzes). Article 2 of the enactment mandated that the award of a higher class be preceded by the award of all preceding classes. As the war progressed, some of the recipients of the Knight's Cross distinguished themselves further and a higher grade, the Knight's Cross of the Iron Cross with Oak Leaves (Ritterkreuz des Eisernen Kreuzes mit Eichenlaub), was instituted. The Oak Leaves, as they were commonly referred to, were based on the enactment Reichsgesetzblatt I S. 849 of 3 June 1940. In 1941, two higher grades of the Knight's Cross were instituted. The enactment Reichsgesetzblatt I S. 613 of 28 September 1941 introduced the Knight's Cross of the Iron Cross with Oak Leaves and Swords (Ritterkreuz des Eisernen Kreuzes mit Eichenlaub und Schwertern) and the Knight's Cross of the Iron Cross with Oak Leaves, Swords and Diamonds (Ritterkreuz des Eisernen Kreuzes mit Eichenlaub, Schwertern und Brillanten). At the end of 1944 the final grade, the Knight's Cross of the Iron Cross with Golden Oak Leaves, Swords, and Diamonds (Ritterkreuz des Eisernen Kreuzes mit goldenem Eichenlaub, Schwertern und Brillanten), based on the enactment Reichsgesetzblatt 1945 I S. 11 of 29 December 1944, became the final variant of the Knight's Cross authorized.

== Recipients ==
The Oberkommando der Wehrmacht (Supreme Command of the Armed Forces) kept separate Knight's Cross lists for the Heer (Army), Kriegsmarine (Navy), Luftwaffe (Air Force) and Waffen-SS. Within each of these lists a unique sequential number was assigned to each recipient. The same numbering paradigm was applied to the higher grades of the Knight's Cross, one list per grade. Of the 26 awards made to servicemen whose last name starts with "I", one was later awarded the Knight's Cross of the Iron Cross with Oak Leaves and Swords and one presentation was made posthumously. Heer members received 16 of the medals, one went to the Kriegsmarine, and nine to the Luftwaffe.

This along with the + (plus) indicates that a higher grade of Knight's Cross was awarded as well.
This along with the * (asterisk) indicates that the Knight's Cross was awarded posthumously.

Name	Service	Rank	Role and unit (Note: For an explanation of the various naming schemes used by the Luftwaffe, Heer, Kriegsmarine and Waffen-SS refer to nomenclature used by the Wehrmacht and Waffen-SS.)	Date of award	Notes	Image
Max Ibel	Luftwaffe	Oberst	Geschwaderkommodore of Jagdgeschwader 27	22 August 1940	—	—
Arthur Iden	Heer	Oberwachtmeister	Leader of an assault gun in the fortress Schneidemühl	10 February 1945	—	—
Ulrich Iffland	Heer	Oberst	Commander of Füssilier-Regiment 22	3 October 1943	—	—
Dr. Rudolf Ihde	Heer	Major	Commander of the I./Sturm-Regiment 195	23 September 1943	—	—
Herbert Ihlefeld+	Luftwaffe	Oberleutnant	Pilot in the I./Jagdgeschwader 77 (Note: According to Scherzer in the I.(J)/Lehrgeschwader 2)	13 September 1940	Awarded 16th Oak Leaves 27 June 1941; 9th Swords 24 April 1942	
Ernst-Wilhelm Ihrig	Luftwaffe	Oberleutnant	Staffelführer of the 3./Kampfgeschwader 3 "Lützow"	23 August 1941 (Note: According to Scherzer on 14 August 1941.)	—	—
Iro Ilk	Luftwaffe	Oberleutnant	Pilot in the 1.(K)/Lehrgeschwader 1	21 October 1942	—	—
Wilhelm-Friedrich Illg	Luftwaffe	Oberfeldwebel (Note: According to Scherzer as Leutnant of the Reserves and pilot in the 9./Kampfgeschwader 76.)	Pilot and board mechanic in the 9./Kampfgeschwader 76	1 October 1940	At the same time promoted to Leutnant of the Reserves	
Fritz Imgenberg	Heer	Stabsfeldwebel	Zugführer (platoon leader) in the Stabskompanie/Grenadier-Regiment 671	9 June 1944	—	—
Bernhard Imminger	Heer	Oberfeldwebel	Zugführer (platoon leader) in the 3./Panzergrenadier-Regiment 67	4 October 1944	—	—
Fritz Indlekofer	Heer	Hauptmann	Commander of the II./Grenadier-Regiment 1050	27 July 1944	—	—
Peter Ingenhoven	Luftwaffe	Hauptmann of the Reserves	Deputy Gruppenkommandeur in Kampfgeschwader z.b.V. 103	11 May 1940	—	—
Hermann Ritter von Ingram	Heer	Unteroffizier	Company troop leader in the 4.(MG)/Infanterie-Regiment 309 (Note: According to Scherzer as company troop leader in the 4./Infanterie-Regiment 309.)	16 June 1940	—	—
Josef Ippisch	Heer	Feldwebel	Zugführer (platoon leader) in the 12.(MG)/Grenadier-Regiment 123 (Note: According to Scherzer as company troop leader in the 12./Grenadier-Regiment 123.)	10 May 1943	—	—
Herbert Isachsen	Luftwaffe	Oberfeldwebel	Pilot in the 3.(K)/Lehrgeschwader 1 (Note: According to Scherzer as pilot in the 2.(K)/Lehrgeschwader 1.)	3 September 1943	—	—
Richard Isczinsky	Heer	Oberfeldwebel	Zugführer (platoon leader) in the 3./Divisions-Füsilier-Bataillon (A.A.) 102 (Note: According to Scherzer as Zugführer (platoon leader) in the 3./Divisions-Füsilier-Bataillon 102.)	17 March 1945	—	—
Otto Iselhorst	Heer	Unteroffizier	Group leader in the Stabskompanie/Jäger-Regiment 24 (L)	14 April 1945	—	—
Eduard Isken	Luftwaffe	Oberfeldwebel	Pilot in the 13./Jagdgeschwader 53	14 January 1945	—	—
Heinz-Jürgen Ißbrücker	Heer	Oberleutnant	Chief of the 3./Panzer-Aufklärungs-Abteilung 7	12 September 1941	—	—
Wilhelm Isselhorst	Heer	Oberleutnant (Note: According to Scherzer as Oberleutnant of the Reserves.)	Chief of the 7./Grenadier-Regiment 258	21 February 1944	—	—
Friedrich Issermann	Heer	Hauptmann	Commander of the I./Grenadier-Regiment 102	8 February 1944	—	—
[Dr.] Otto Ites (Note: The brackets around the doctor title [Dr.] denotes that the academic title was attained after the Knight's Cross of the Iron Cross was awarded.)	Kriegsmarine	Oberleutnant zur See	Commander of U-94	28 March 1942	—	—
Dirk Itzen	Luftwaffe	Leutnant	Reconnaissance officer in the 3./Flak-Regiment "General Göring" (motorized) (Note: According to Scherzer as Reconnaissance officer in the 3./(Flak-)Regiment "General Göring".)	23 November 1941*	Died of wounds 13 July 1941	—
Hans-Henning Ivers	Heer	Oberleutnant	Leader of the III./Infanterie-Regiment 46	17 October 1942	—	—
Fritz Iwand	Heer	Oberstleutnant (Note: According to Scherzer as Major.)	Commander of I./Schützen-Regiment 10	15 May 1940	—	—
Otto Iwannek	Heer	Obergefreiter	Messenger in the 2./Grenadier-Regiment 45	17 March 1945	—	—
