= Theodor Nordmann =

- Born: 18 December 1918; Dorsten, Germany
- Died: 19 January 1945 (aged 26) near Insterburg, Nazi Germany
- Military career
- Allegiance: Nazi Germany
- Branch: Luftwaffe
- Service years: 1937–45
- Rank: Major
- Nickname: "Theo"
- Units: StG 1, StG 3
- Conflicts: World War II: Battle of France; Battle of Britain; Battle of Crete; Operation Barbarossa
- Awards: Knight's Cross of the Iron Cross with Oak Leaves and Swords

Major Theodor Nordmann (18 December 1918 in Dorsten – 19 January 1945 near Insterburg) was a World War II Luftwaffe Stuka ace. He was also a recipient of the Knight's Cross of the Iron Cross with Oak Leaves and Swords. The Knight's Cross of the Iron Cross, and its variants were the highest awards in the military and paramilitary forces of Nazi Germany during World War II.

== Career ==
Nordmann joined the Luftwaffe in 1937, and served as a reconnaissance pilot until March 1940, when he transferred to 1./StG 186, flying the Junkers Ju 87 'Stuka'. The unit was originally intended to serve on the aircraft carrier Graf Zeppelin, but in July 1940 was renamed III./Sturzkampfgeschwader 1 (StG 1—1st Dive Bomber Wing) and flew conventional bombing missions during the battle of France and Battle of Britain. Nordmann was awarded the Iron cross 1st and 2nd class during 1940. In 1941 Nordmann's unit was relocated to the Mediterranean for actions against Malta, where he claimed a 5,000 ton merchantman sunk.

StG 1 took part in the invasion of Russia in June 1941 and in September 1941, after 200 operations and 20 tanks destroyed, he was awarded the Knight's Cross.

During the fighting over Orel in the summer of 1942, Nordmann, as Staffelkapitän (squadron leader) of 8./StG 1, made his 600th operational mission, the first Stuka pilot to achieve this total.

His radio operator and gunner, Feldwebel Gerhard Rothe, was one of only 15 Stuka gunners to be honored with the Knight's Cross of the Iron Cross.

In January 1945 Nordmann was killed when his Focke-Wulf Fw 190 F-8 (Werknummer 588202—factory number) collided with his wing man, Oberfeldwebel Sroka (Fw 190 F-8 Werknummer 933242) in bad weather north of Insterburg. Nordmann was Gruppenkommandeur of II./Schlachtgeschwader 3 (SG 3—3rd Assault Wing) from October 1943 until his death in January 1945. He claimed some 80 Soviet tanks destroyed and 43,000 gross register tons (GRT) of merchant shipping sunk. He flew almost 1300 combat missions, including roughly 200 with the Fw 190.

== Awards ==
- German Cross in Gold on 20 October 1942 as Oberleutnant in the III./Sturzkampfgeschwader 1
- Iron Cross (1939) 2nd Class (24 May 1940) & 1st Class (29 August 1940)
- Knight's Cross of the Iron Cross with Oak Leaves and Swords
  - Knight's Cross on 17 September 1941 Leutnant and pilot in the 8./Sturzkampfgeschwader 1
  - 214th Oak Leaves on 17 March 1943 as Oberleutnant and acting commander of the III./Sturzkampfgeschwader 1 (Note: According to Scherzer on 16 March 1943 as leader of the III./Sturzkampfgeschwader 1.)
  - 98th Swords on 17 September 1944 as Major and Gruppenkommandeur of II./Schlachtgeschwader 3
