= Georg Haus =

German General (1895-1945)

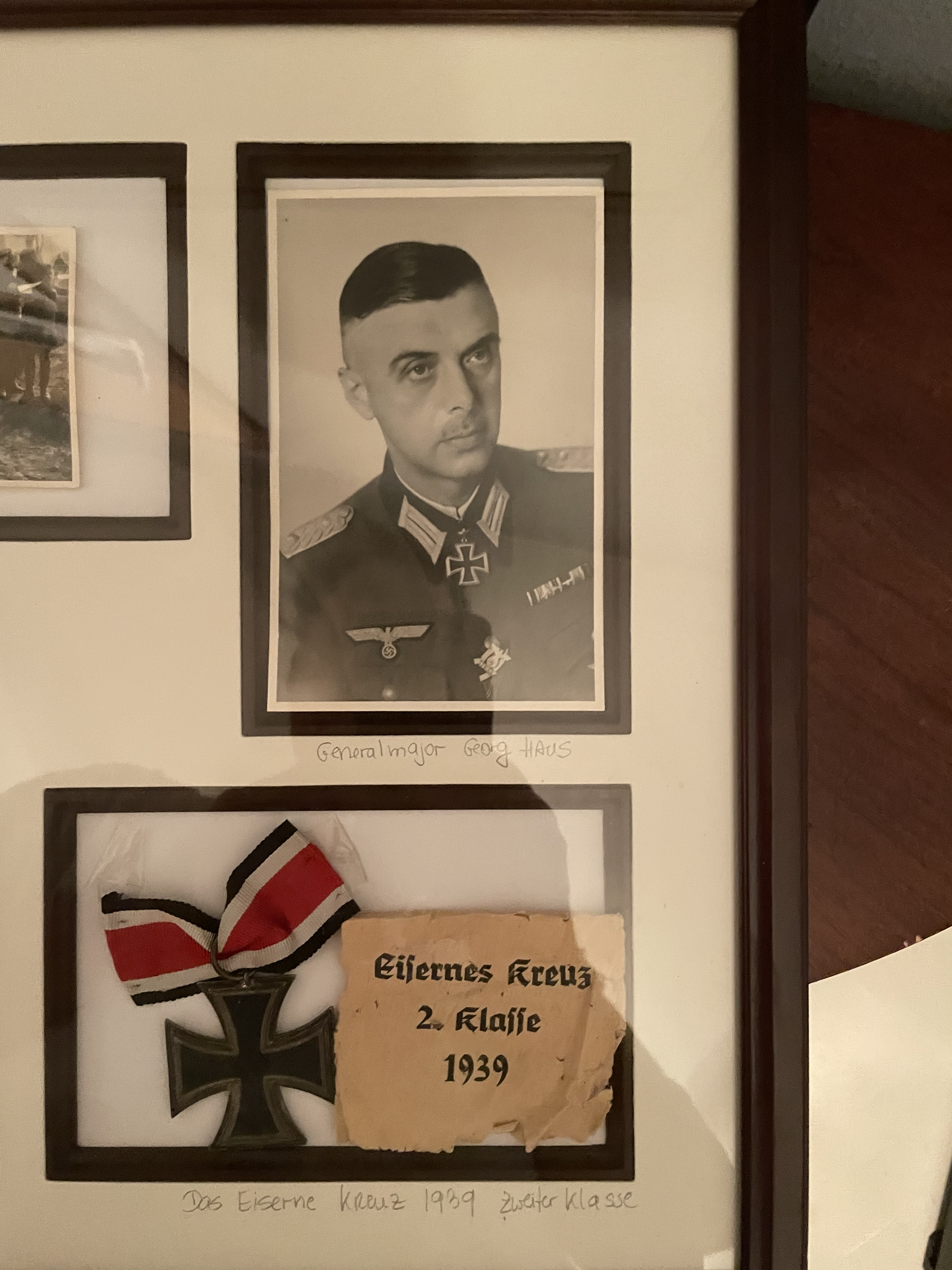
- Born: 16 September 1895
- Died: 16 April 1945 (aged 49); Pillau, East Prussia
- Military career
- Allegiance: Nazi Germany
- Branch: Army (Wehrmacht)
- Rank: Generalleutnant (Posthumously)
- Commands: 17th Infantry Division; 50th Infantry Division
- Conflicts: Zemland Offensive †
- Awards: Knight's Cross of the Iron Cross

Georg Haus (16 September 1895 – 16 April 1945) was a general in the Wehrmacht of Nazi Germany during World War II. He was a recipient of the Knight's Cross of the Iron Cross. Haus was killed on 16 April 1945 near Pillau, East Prussia during the Soviet Zemland Offensive. He was posthumously promoted to Generalleutnant.

== Awards and decorations ==
- Knight's Cross of the Iron Cross on 12 February 1944 as Oberst and commander of Grenadier-Regiment 55

== Notes ==
Military offices
Preceded by Oberst Otto-Hermann Brücker	Commander of 17. Infanterie-Division; 15 March 1944 – 1 April 1944	Succeeded by Oberst Theodor Preu
Preceded by Generalleutnant Paul Betz	Commander of 50. Infanterie-Division; 5 June 1944 – 16 April 1945	Succeeded by Generalmajor Kurt Domansky
