= Richard Zimmer =

German general

- Born: 21 June 1893
- Died: 20 June 1971 (aged 77)
- Military career
- Allegiance: Nazi Germany
- Branch: Army
- Rank: Generalleutnant
- Commands: 17th Infantry Division
- Conflicts: World War II
- Awards: Knight's Cross of the Iron Cross

Richard Zimmer (21 June 1893 – 20 June 1971) was a German general in the Wehrmacht during World War II who commanded the 17th Infantry Division. He was a recipient of the Knight's Cross of the Iron Cross of Nazi Germany.

== Awards ==
- German Cross in Gold on 8 June 1942 as Oberst in Gebirgs-Pionier-Regiment 620
- Knight's Cross of the Iron Cross on 16 October 1944 as Generalleutnant and commander of 17. Infanterie-Division

Military offices
Preceded by Generalleutnant Gustav-Adolf von Zangen	Commander of 17. Infanterie-Division; 1 April 1943 - December 1943	Succeeded by Oberst Scheiker
Preceded by Oberst Theodor Preu	Commander of 17. Infanterie-Division; 12 April 1944 - September 1944	Succeeded by Generalmajor Max Sachsenheimer
