= Max Sachsenheimer =

Nazi general (1909–1973)

- Born: 5 December 1909
- Died: 2 June 1973 (aged 63)
- Military career
- Allegiance: Nazi Germany
- Branch: Army
- Rank: Generalmajor
- Commands: 17th Infantry Division
- Conflicts: World War II
- Awards: Knight's Cross of the Iron Cross with Oak Leaves and Swords

Max Heinrich Sachsenheimer (5 December 1909 – 2 June 1973) was a German general in the Wehrmacht during World War II who commanded the 17th Infantry Division. He was a recipient of the Knight's Cross of the Iron Cross with Oak Leaves and Swords of Nazi Germany. On the 5th or 6 February 1945, as part of the Vistula-Oder offensive in Dyhernfurth, he had made it possible for a commando operation to evacuate and destroy a special factory, which was probably a Tabun production plant for the Anorgana company.

== Awards ==
- Iron Cross (1939) 2nd Class (25 May 1940) & 1st Class (15 June 1940)
- German Cross in Gold on 3 February 1943 as Major in the II./Jäger-Regiment 75
- Knight's Cross of the Iron Cross with Oak Leaves and Swords
  - Knight's Cross on 5 April 1942 as Hauptmann and commander of II./Jäger-Regiment 75
  - 472nd Oak Leaves on 14 May 1944 as Major and leader of Jäger-Regiment 75
  - 132nd Swords on 6 February 1945 as Generalmajor and commander of 17. Infanterie-Division

Military offices
Preceded by Generalleutnant Richard Zimmer	Commander of 17th Infanterie-Division; 4 September 1944 – 8 May 1945	Succeeded by none
