= Werner Ziegler =

German officer during World War II (1916–2001)

- Born: 30 April 1916; Hausach, German Empire
- Died: 15 April 2001 (aged 84); Oftersheim, Germany
- Military career
- Allegiance: Nazi Germany; West Germany
- Branch: Army
- Service years: 1936–1945; 1956–1967
- Rank: Oberstleutnant; Oberst
- Conflicts: World War II
- Awards: Knight's Cross of the Iron Cross with Oak Leaves and Swords
- Other work: Bundeswehr

Werner Ziegler (30 April 1916 – 15 April 2001) was a German officer during World War II. He was also a recipient of the Knight's Cross of the Iron Cross with Oak Leaves and Swords of Nazi Germany.

Ziegler joined the Bundeswehr in 1956, working at the Infantry School in Hammelburg under General Hellmuth Mäder. In 1960 Ziegler was deputy commander of the Panzergrenadierbrigade 35. Seven years later he retired as Oberst and commander of the Panzergrenadierbrigade 19 in Ahlen.

== Awards ==
- Wound Badge in Black
- Infantry Assault Badge in Bronze
- Close Combat Clasp in Bronze
- Tank Destruction Badge for Individual Combatants
- Crimea Shield
- Iron Cross (1939) 2nd Class (7 July 1940) & 1st Class (26 April 1941)
- Knight's Cross of the Iron Cross with Oak Leaves and Swords
  - Knight's Cross on 31 December 1941 as Leutnant and leader of the 2./Infanterie-Regiment 186
  - 121st Oak Leaves on 8 September 1942 as Oberleutnant and leader of the 2./Infanterie-Regiment 186
  - 102nd Swords on 23 October 1944 as Major and leader of Infanterie-Regiment 186
