= Geschwaderkommodore =

Luftwaffe position

Geschwaderkommodore (short also Kommodore) is a Luftwaffe position or appointment (not rank), originating during World War II. A Geschwaderkommodore is usually an OF5-rank of Oberst (colonel) or Kapitän zur See (naval captain). A Geschwaderkommodore will command a Geschwader (Wing), which in turn contains Gruppen (Groups) each commanded by a Gruppenkommandeur (Group Commander).

== See also ==
- Organization of the Luftwaffe (1933–1945)
