= 17th Infantry Division (Wehrmacht) =

German infantry division (1934 – 1945)

- German: 17. Infanterie-Division
- Active: 1 October 1934 – 8 May 1945
- Country: Germany
- Branch: German Army (Heer)
- Type: Infantry
- Size: Division
- Engagements: World War II; Polish Campaign; French Campaign; Operation Barbarossa; Odessa Offensive; Battle of Romania

The 17th Infantry Division was an infantry division of the German Army, active before and during World War II. Formed in 1934, it took part in most of the campaigns of the Wehrmacht and was decimated in January 1945. Reconstituted in Germany, it surrendered to the Allies in May of that year. The division was responsible for a number of war crimes.

== History ==
The unit was formed in October 1934 in Nuremberg under the designation Wehrgauleitung Nürnberg. Shortly after its creation it was renamed Artillerieführer VII. (Note: Literally "artillery commander No. 7", a covert name for the commander of artillery of the former 7th Infantry of the Reichswehr who took command of the newly formed unit of the Wehrmacht and after whom the unit was named in order to conceal its size, and to camouflage its numbers) Although created as an en cadre division from the very beginning, both names were intended to suggest much smaller units, as German military strength was still restricted by the Treaty of Versailles. After Adolf Hitler renounced the treaty, and officially announced the creation of the Wehrmacht in October 1935, the unit was renamed to the 17th Infantry Division.

The organic regimental units of this division were formed by the expansion of the 21st Bavarian Infantry Regiment of the 7th Infantry Division of the Reichswehr. The division participated in the annexation of Austria in March 1938. During the Invasion of Poland it was reinforced by the Leibstandarte SS Adolf Hitler and attached to the German Eighth Army of Gen. Johannes Blaskowitz. Under command of Gen. Herbert Loch, the division took part in heavy fighting in Silesia, then in the vicinity of Łódź. At Pabianice it faced elements of the Polish 28th Infantry Division and the Wołyńska Cavalry Brigade. After the war, the Poles accused the division of committing atrocities.

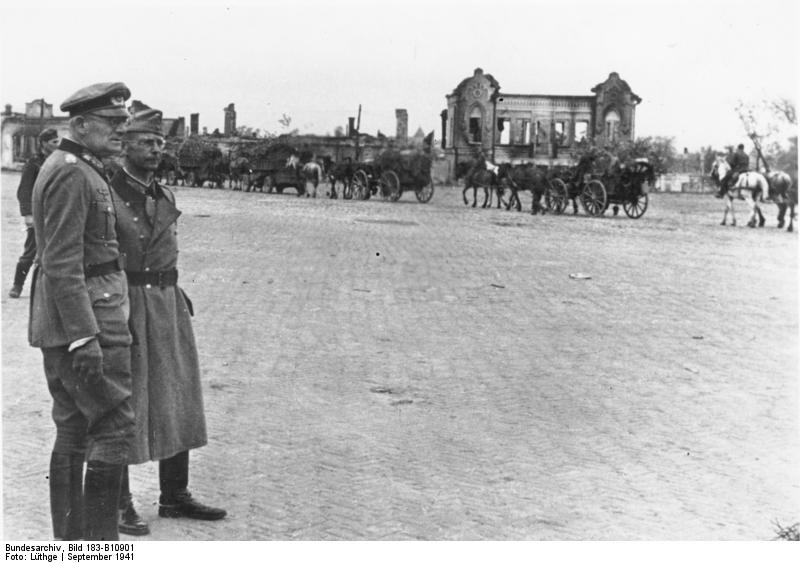
Maximilian von Weichs and Herbert Loch 1941, Tschernigow

=== War crimes ===
Throughout the war, the soldiers of the 17th division committed a number of war crimes, notably in Poland during the 1939 campaign. In a war crime investigation by the KBZPNP commission, the predecessor of the Institute of National Remembrance, it was established that the first major war crime occurred between 3 and 4 September 1939 in the vicinity of Złoczew. In a large scale mass murder, the soldiers of the 17th Division burnt approximately 80% of buildings in the town and killed without a trial approximately 200 Polish citizens of Polish and Jewish ethnicity, out of whom only 71 people were identified after the war, while the identity of the remaining victims was impossible to establish as they were war refugees unknown to local inhabitants. Some of the victims were burnt alive, while the bodies of other people were thrown into burning houses. After the war the Polish authorities presented the West German prosecutors' office with the documents of the investigation, as well as the detailed information on the 71 identified victims. However, the latter declined to prosecute the war crimes on various grounds. The German authorities argued that it was impossible to determine which units of the 17th Division took part in the crimes as the 1st chapter of the war diary of Leibstandarte SS Adolf Hitler Regiment was missing. Moreover, the German prosecutors argued, that the deeds described by the witnesses must have been directly related to warfare, notably struggle against the partisans ["Freischärler"] and that all of the civilian victims were hostile towards the German forces. The only two cases excluded from that reasoning was the murder of a 1½ year old child murdered with a butt of a German soldiers' rifle and the case of a wounded woman thrown into a burning house. The earlier case was explained as a common crime (and as such subject to non-claim), while the latter case was turned down due to inability to find the direct responsible. The same reasoning was given for the case of 10 Polish peasants executed in the nearby village of Grójec Wielki after a Polish reconnaissance plane appeared in the area.

In a separate case investigated by the after the war, the KBZPNP commission requested the prosecution of the commanders of the 10th and 17th Divisions, which took part in a mass murder of several dozen Poles in the village of Włyń near Łódź. (Note: In fact the Polish commission presented the German authorities with documents only on cases of six Polish citizens murdered that day, who were known by name and whose cases could be sufficiently investigated) All cases of the murder of Polish civilians in that village were turned down by the German prosecutors' office on 22 April 1974. The German authorities argued, that it is not impossible that all the civilians trying to escape from the German forces were in fact partisans. This was the reasoning in the case of certain Ochecki who was shot to death while trying to rescue his cattle from a barn set in flames by the German soldiers. The German authorities argued that it was fair to assume that he was trying to escape from the German soldiers. The same reasoning was given in the case of a mentally sick person shot the same day. In the case of Wawrzyn Piecyk, who was killed while being wounded and unconscious, it was argued that he might have been pretending to be unconscious in order to escape from the German soldiers, while the case of Józef Jawor, a man who did not stop when requested to and instead hid in his house, where he was shot through the doors, was explained as a killing done during a fight. The case of Maria Konieczna, a deaf woman who was shot after not responding to a German soldier, was considered a common crime (and thus subject to non-claim), while the killing of Józef Gałka was explained as legitimate, since a picture of his brother in Polish military uniform found in Gałka's wallet was a proof that he might have been a partisan himself. In the same decision, the German authorities declared that the patients of the mental institution in the town of Warta, killed by the soldiers of the 17th Division in the hospital and dressed in hospital pyjamas, were victims of a common crime rather than a war crime or a murder, and thus subject to non-claim.

In addition to that, the Leibstandarte regiment attached to the 17th Division was notorious for burning all villages it passed through.

=== After the invasion of Poland ===
After the war against Poland, the unit was withdrawn to Germany and then took part in the battle of France, as part of XIIIth Corps. Afterwards, in the summer of 1940, the division trained for taking part in the abortive invasion of England. In 1941 it participated in Operation Barbarossa as part of Army Group Center. In the fall of 1941 it took part in the Battle of Moscow. After sustaining heavy losses, it was withdrawn to France in June 1942. The division returned to the Eastern Front in April 1943, fighting around river Mius, Nikopol, Uman, Kishinev and Jassy. In August 1944 the unit was shifted to Poland and fought to contain Soviet bridgeheads on the Vistula river, around Warka and Radom.

On 1 January 1945, the 17th Infantry Division (then part of 9th Army under Army Group A) had a strength of 10,828 men.

The division remained in the Warka—Radom sector until it was heavily damaged in the course of the Soviet Vistula-Oder offensive in January 1945. The division was then reconstituted from its remnants and fought in April and May 1945 in the area around Görlitz. At the end of the war it was located in the Riesengebirge mountains (today Karkonosze).

== Commanding officers ==
- Generalleutnant Herbert Loch, 1 September 1939
- Generalleutnant Ernst Güntzel, 28 October 1941
- Generalleutnant Gustav-Adolf von Zangen, 25 December 1941
- Generalmajor Richard Zimmer, 1 April 1943
- Oberst Scheiker, December 1943
- Generalmajor Paul Schricker, January 1944
- Oberst Otto-Hermann Brücker, February 1944
- Oberst Georg Haus, 15 March 1944
- Oberst Theodor Preu, 1 April 1944
- Generalleutnant Richard Zimmer, April 1944
- Generalmajor Max Sachsenheimer, 4 September 1944
