= Adelbert Schulz =

German officer of the police and the Wehrmacht

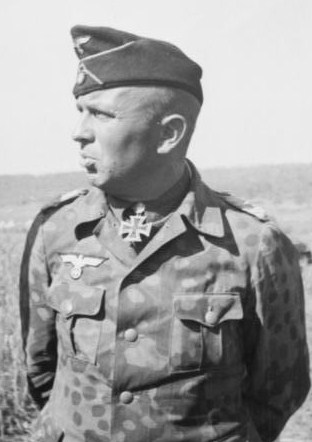
- Born: 20 December 1903; Berlin, Kingdom of Prussia, German Empire
- Died: 28 January 1944 (aged 40) Shepetivka, Soviet Union
- Buried: German War Cemetery at Starokostiantyniv
- Allegiance: Nazi Germany
- Branch: German Army
- Service years: 1935–1944
- Rank: Generalmajor
- Commands: 7th Panzer Division
- Conflicts: World War II; Battle of France; Operation Barbarossa; Third Battle of Kharkov; Battle of Kursk
- Awards: Knight's Cross of the Iron Cross with Oak Leaves, Swords and Diamonds

Adelbert Schulz (20 December 1903 – 28 January 1944) was a German officer of the police and the Wehrmacht, at last general and division commander in the Panzertruppe during World War II. He was one of only 27 recipients of the Knight's Cross of the Iron Cross with Oak Leaves, Swords and Diamonds of Nazi Germany.

== Life ==
Adelbert (sometimes written Adalbert) Schulz was born on 20 December 1903 in Berlin; he began his career in the police. In 1935 Schulz transferred from the Police to the German Army. Schulz's unit took part in the occupations of Austria and the Sudetenland. He participated in the Battle of France serving under General Erwin Rommel. On 29 September 1940 he received the Knight's Cross of the Iron Cross. He was awarded the Oak Leaves to his Knights Cross on 31 December 1941. On 6 August 1943 he received the Swords to his Knight's Cross and was promoted to Colonel. On 9 January 1944, he received Diamonds to his knights Cross, was promoted to Generalmajor and made commander of the 7th Panzer Division.

== Death ==
Schulz was wounded in action in the area of Shepetivka on 28 January 1944, and died the same day.

== Awards ==
- Iron Cross (1939) 2nd Class (24 May 1940) & 1st Class (24 May 1940)
- Knight's Cross of the Iron Cross with Oak Leaves, Swords and Diamonds
  - Knight's Cross on 29 September 1940 as Hauptmann and chief of the 1./Panzer-Regiment 25
  - 47th Oak Leaves on 31 December 1941 as Hauptmann and commander of the I./Panzer-Regiment 25
  - 33rd Swords on 6 August 1943 as Oberstleutnant and commander of the Panzer-Regiment 25
  - 9th Diamonds on 14 December 1943 as Oberst and commander of the Panzer-Regiment 25'

Military offices
Preceded by General der Panzertruppe Hasso von Manteuffel	Commander of 7th Panzer Division; January 1944 – 28 January 1944	Succeeded by Oberst Wolfgang Gläsemer
