= Blue-ribbon committee =

Expert investigative group

In the United States, a blue-ribbon committee (or panel or commission) is a group of exceptional people appointed to investigate, study or analyze a given question. Blue-ribbon committees generally have a degree of independence from political influence or other authority, and such committees usually have no direct authority of their own. Their value comes from their ability to use their expertise to issue findings or recommendations which can then be used by those with decision-making power to act.

== Appointment and composition ==
A blue-ribbon committee is often appointed by a government body or executive to report on a matter of controversy. It might be composed of independent scientific experts or academics with no direct government ties to study a particular issue or question, or it might be composed of citizens well known for their general intelligence, experience and non-partisan interests to study a matter of political reform. The "blue-ribbon" aspect comes from the presentation of the committee as the "best and brightest" for the task; the appointment of such a committee, ad hoc, is meant to signal its perspective as outsiders of the usual process for study and decisions.

The designation "blue-ribbon" is often made by the appointing authority, and may be disputed by others who might see the committee as less independent, or as a way for an authority to dodge responsibility.

== Examples ==
Examples of high-level blue-ribbon committees in the United States would be the Warren Commission investigating the Kennedy Assassination, the 9/11 Commission investigating the September 11, 2001 terrorist attacks, the Iraq Study Group assessing the Iraq War and the Clinton Administration's White House Task Force on National Health Care Reform. In each case, the committee did not have authority to indict or legislate, and their brief was to investigate and issue a report on the facts as they found them with recommendations for changes for government policy in the future. The current Blue Ribbon Panel on "sustaining America's diverse fish & wildlife resources" emphasizes incentives of industries, businesses and landowners to aid in conservation funding to prevent species from being added to the endangered species list.

== Usage ==
The term has leaked into official usage. From January 29, 2010, to January 2012, the U.S. had a Blue Ribbon Commission on America's Nuclear Future. There are other government and private commissions with "Blue Ribbon Commission" in their names. These and others are often referred to simply as "the Blue Ribbon Commission" or "the blue ribbon commission", creating the potential for confusion.

== See also ==
- Senate Blue Ribbon Committee in the Philippines
