= Gruppenkommandeur =

Position in the German armed forces

Gruppenkommandeur is a Luftwaffe position (not rank), that is the equivalent of a commander of a group or wing in other air forces. A Gruppenkommandeur usually has the rank of Major or Oberstleutnant (Lieutenant Colonel), and commands a Gruppe, which is a sub-unit of a Geschwader. A Gruppe usually consists of three or four Staffeln (each of which is commanded by a Staffelkapitän).

== See also ==
- Organization of the Luftwaffe (1933–1945)
