= List of Knight's Cross of the Iron Cross recipients (Hn–Hz) =

The Knight's Cross of the Iron Cross (German: Ritterkreuz des Eisernen Kreuzes) and its variants were the highest awards in the military and paramilitary forces of Nazi Germany during World War II. The Knight's Cross of the Iron Cross was awarded for a wide range of reasons and across all ranks, from a senior commander for skilled leadership of his troops in battle to a low-ranking soldier for a single act of extreme gallantry. A total of 7,321 awards were made between its first presentation on 30 September 1939 and its last bestowal on 17 June 1945. (Note: Großadmiral and President of Germany Karl Dönitz, Hitler's successor as Head of State (Staatsoberhaupt) and Supreme Commander of the Armed Forces, had ordered the cessation of all promotions and awards as of 11 May 1945 (Dönitz-decree). Consequently the last Knight's Cross awarded to Oberleutnant zur See of the Reserves Georg-Wolfgang Feller on 17 June 1945 must therefore be considered a de facto but not de jure hand-out.) This number is based on the analysis and acceptance of the order commission of the Association of Knight's Cross Recipients (AKCR). Presentations were made to members of the three military branches of the Wehrmacht—the Heer (Army), Kriegsmarine (Navy) and Luftwaffe (Air Force)—as well as the Waffen-SS, the Reichsarbeitsdienst (RAD—Reich Labour Service) and the Volkssturm (German national militia). There were also 43 recipients in the military forces of allies of the Third Reich.

These recipients are listed in the 1986 edition of Walther-Peer Fellgiebel's book, Die Träger des Ritterkreuzes des Eisernen Kreuzes 1939–1945 — The Bearers of the Knight's Cross of the Iron Cross 1939–1945. Fellgiebel was the former chairman and head of the order commission of the AKCR. In 1996, the second edition of this book was published with an addendum delisting 11 of these original recipients. Author Veit Scherzer has cast doubt on a further 193 of these listings. The majority of the disputed recipients had received the award in 1945, when the deteriorating situation of Germany in the final days of World War II in Europe left a number of nominations incomplete and pending in various stages of the approval process.

Listed here are the 224 Knight's Cross recipients of the Wehrmacht and Waffen-SS whose last name is in the range "Hn–Hz". Scherzer has challenged the validity of 14 of these listings. This is the second of two lists of all 661 Knight's Cross of the Iron Cross recipients whose last name starts with "H". The recipients whose last name is in the range "Ha–Hm" are listed at List of Knight's Cross of the Iron Cross recipients (Ha–Hm). The recipients are initially ordered alphabetically by last name. The rank listed is the recipient's rank at the time the Knight's Cross was awarded.

== Background ==
The Knight's Cross of the Iron Cross and its higher grades were based on four separate enactments. The first enactment, Reichsgesetzblatt I S. 1573 of 1 September 1939 instituted the Iron Cross (Eisernes Kreuz), the Knight's Cross of the Iron Cross and the Grand Cross of the Iron Cross (Großkreuz des Eisernen Kreuzes). Article 2 of the enactment mandated that the award of a higher class be preceded by the award of all preceding classes. As the war progressed, some of the recipients of the Knight's Cross distinguished themselves further and a higher grade, the Knight's Cross of the Iron Cross with Oak Leaves (Ritterkreuz des Eisernen Kreuzes mit Eichenlaub), was instituted. The Oak Leaves, as they were commonly referred to, were based on the enactment Reichsgesetzblatt I S. 849 of 3 June 1940. In 1941, two higher grades of the Knight's Cross were instituted. The enactment Reichsgesetzblatt I S. 613 of 28 September 1941 introduced the Knight's Cross of the Iron Cross with Oak Leaves and Swords (Ritterkreuz des Eisernen Kreuzes mit Eichenlaub und Schwertern) and the Knight's Cross of the Iron Cross with Oak Leaves, Swords and Diamonds (Ritterkreuz des Eisernen Kreuzes mit Eichenlaub, Schwertern und Brillanten). At the end of 1944 the final grade, the Knight's Cross of the Iron Cross with Golden Oak Leaves, Swords, and Diamonds (Ritterkreuz des Eisernen Kreuzes mit goldenem Eichenlaub, Schwertern und Brillanten), based on the enactment Reichsgesetzblatt 1945 I S. 11 of 29 December 1944, became the final variant of the Knight's Cross authorized.

== Recipients ==
Knight's Cross of the Iron Cross (Hn–Hz)
Service	Number of presentations	Posthumous presentations
Heer (incl. Volkssturm)	155	11
Kriegsmarine	7	0
Luftwaffe	55	4
Waffen-SS	7	1

The Oberkommando der Wehrmacht (Supreme Command of the Armed Forces) kept separate Knight's Cross lists for the Waffen-SS and for each of the three military branches, the Heer (Army), Kriegsmarine (Navy), and Luftwaffe (Air Force). Within each of these lists a unique sequential number was assigned to each recipient. The same numbering paradigm was applied to the higher grades of the Knight's Cross, one list per grade. Of the 224 awards made to servicemen whose last name is in the range "Hn–Hz", 24 were later awarded the Knight's Cross of the Iron Cross with Oak Leaves, three the Knight's Cross of the Iron Cross with Oak Leaves and Swords and one the Knight's Cross of the Iron Cross with Oak Leaves, Swords and Diamonds; 16 presentations were made posthumously. Heer members, including the Volkssturm, received 155 of the medals; 7 went to the Kriegsmarine, 55 to the Luftwaffe, and 7 to the Waffen-SS.

This along with the + (plus) indicates that a higher grade of Knight's Cross was awarded as well.
This along with the * (asterisk) indicates that the Knight's Cross was awarded posthumously.
This along with the ? (question mark) indicates that author Veit Scherzer has expressed doubt regarding the veracity and formal correctness of the listing.

Name	Service	Rank	Role and unit (Note: For an explanation of the various naming schemes used by the Luftwaffe, Heer, Kriegsmarine and Waffen-SS refer to nomenclature used by the Wehrmacht and Waffen-SS.)	Date of award	Notes	Image
Cord von Hobe? (Note: Cord von Hobe was twice nominated for the Knight's Cross of the Iron Cross. The first nomination was submitted on 30 March 1945 for actions near Trier as commander of Grenadier-Regiment 226. This nomination was approved by Major Joachim Domaschk on 3 April. A Heerespersonalamt-Verleihungsvorschlag (HPA-VV—Army Staff Office Nomination Recommendation) Nr. 4970 was created and forwarded. Hitler rejected this nomination on 10 April. The HPA-VV and file card note the rejection-Nr. 3984. Both HPA-VV and file card still exist today. A second nomination, most likely a teleprinter message, for actions near Marktbreit does not exist anymore. No HPA-VV nor file card were created. Von Hobe was added to the 1st section of the book "Verliehene Ritterkreuze" (Awarded Knight Crosses) by Major Domaschk with an entry Nr. 5102. This number was assigned twice since the 2nd section also starts with Nr. 5100. Why Major Domaschk listed Von Hobe in this section remains unanswered. However, this entry reveals that the nomination was received by the HPA on 9 May 1945, and forwarded on this day to General Ernst Maisel and presented the very same day. This presentation was noted and communicated both by radio message and in written format to the OB West. A second file card in the German Federal Archives, based on the information contained in the book "Verliehene Ritterkreuze", was created by the Federal Ministry of Defence in the 60s. This presentation was illegal, first, because the presentation occurred after 8 May 1945, secondly, because neither General Maisel nor Major Domaschk were authorized at this time. Von Hobe was a member of the Association of Knight's Cross Recipients (AKCR).)	Heer	Oberstleutnant	Commander of a Kampfgruppe of the XIII. SS-Armeekorps	9 May 1945	—	Black-and-white photo of a man wearing a white military uniform sitting at a desk, making a phone call.
Johann Hoch	Heer	Unteroffizier	Zugführer (platoon leader) in the 9./Grenadier-Regiment 1070	17 September 1944	—	—
Friedrich Hochbaum+	Heer	Generalleutnant	Commander of the 34. Infanterie-Division	22 August 1943	Awarded 486th Oak Leaves 4 June 1944	—
Günther Hochgartz	Heer	Hauptmann	Leader of the II./Grenadier-Regiment 187	15 April 1944	—	—
Franz-Rainer Hocke	Heer	Obergefreiter	Group leader in the 7./Grenadier-Regiment 200 (motorized)	5 November 1944*	Killed in action 20 October 1944	—
Fritz Hockenjos	Heer	Hauptmann of the Reserves	Deputy leader of the II./Grenadier-Regiment 380	2 September 1944	—	—
[Dr.] Herbert Hodurek (Note: The brackets around the doctor title [Dr.] denotes that the academic title was attained after the Knight's Cross of the Iron Cross was awarded.)	Heer	Hauptmann	Leader of the III./Gebirgsjäger-Regiment 144	15 April 1944	—	—
Hanskurt Höcker	Heer	Generalleutnant	Commander of the 258. Infanterie-Division	14 April 1943	—	—
Walter Hoeckner	Luftwaffe	Hauptmann	Gruppenkommandeur of the I./Jagdgeschwader 4 (Note: According to Scherzer as Gruppenkommandeur of the II./Jagdgeschwader 1.)	6 April 1944	—	—
Robert Hoefeld	Luftwaffe	Oberleutnant	Leader of 4./Fallschirmjäger-Regiment 5 (Note: According to Scherzer as leader of 4./Jäger-Regiment "Hermann Göring".)	18 May 1943	—	—
Heinrich Höfemeier	Luftwaffe	Oberfeldwebel	Pilot in the 1./Jagdgeschwader 51 "Mölders"	5 April 1942	—	—
Dirk Höfer	Heer	Hauptmann	Commander of Pionier-Bataillon 256	14 April 1945	—	—
Heinrich Höfer+	Luftwaffe	Hauptmann	Gruppenkommandeur of the II./Kampfgeschwader 55	3 September 1943	Awarded 656th Oak Leaves 18 November 1944	—
Hugo Höfl	Heer	Generalleutnant	Commander of the 206. Infanterie-Division	4 December 1941	—	—
Karl Höflinger	Luftwaffe	Leutnant of the Reserves	Pilot in the 9./Kampfgeschwader 77	7 March 1941	—	—
Franz-Josef Högl	Heer	Major	Commander of Panzer-Pionier-Bataillon 220 (Note: According to Scherzer as commander of Panzer-Pionier-Bataillon 200.)	26 November 1944	—	—
Karl Höhle	Heer	Major (Note: According to Scherzer as Major of the Reserves.)	Commander of the III./Grenadier-Regiment 378	11 March 1945	—	—
Friedrich Höhne+	Heer	Hauptmann	Commander of the III./Jäger-Regiment 204	3 May 1942	Awarded 253rd Oak Leaves 8 June 1943	—
Georg Höhne	Heer	Major	Leader of Panzergrenadier-Regiment 26	18 February 1945	—	—
Gustav Höhne+	Heer	Generalmajor	Commander of the 8. Infanterie-Division	30 June 1941	Awarded 238th Oak Leaves 17 May 1943	—
Otto Höhne	Luftwaffe	Oberstleutnant	Geschwaderkommodore of Kampfgeschwader 54	5 September 1940	—	Black-and-white photo of a man wearing a military uniform.
Helmut Höhno	Heer	Leutnant	Zugführer (platoon leader) in the schwere (heavy) Panzer-Abteilung 510	9 December 1944	—	—
Stefan-Heinrich Höke	Heer	Oberstleutnant	Commander of Grenadier-Regiment 18	28 July 1943	—	—
Hermann Hölter? (Note: No evidence regarding the presentation of the Knight's Cross of the Iron Cross to Hermann Hölter can be found in the German Federal Archives. The presumed presentation to Hölter was discussed three times by the order commission of the Association of Knight's Cross Recipients (AKCR). The chairman was Walther-Peer Fellgiebel and the ruling in 1976/76 was "no", in 1981/82 "yes 3 May 1945" and "no" again in 1983/84. Fellgiebel chose to list him in his 1986 published book. Apparently Hölter presented his pay book as evidence in 1981. This evidence had been accepted by Fellgiebel at the time. What motivated Fellgiebel to strike him from the list again two years later only to add him again remains unanswered. A presentation is questionable for two reasons. First, Hitler banned presentation for pure leadership reasons on 10 March 1945. As of this date, the Knight's Cross could only be presented for personal bravery. There was no noteworthy combat in Norway in 1945, and Hölter was a member of the general staff and not in command of any direct combatants. Scherzer states that the presentation date suggests that it is an assumption or manipulation. The presentation date is closely linked to the radio communication for the empowerment for autonomous presentations. Hölter was a member of the AKCR.)	Heer	Generalleutnant	Chief of the general staff of the 20. Gebirgsarmee	3 May 1945	—	—
Johannes Hölz	Heer	Oberst im Generalstab (in the General Staff)	Chief of the general staff of the LV. Armeekorps	10 October 1944	—	—
Walter Hölz	Heer	Hauptmann	Commander of the III./Gebirgsjäger-Regiment 98	26 December 1944	—	—
Arnulf Hölzerkopf	Kriegsmarine	Korvettenkapitän	Chief of the 8. Minensuchflottille	15 May 1944	—	—
Hans Hölzl	Heer	Hauptmann	Commanded for general staff training to the VI. Armeekorps and leader of a Kampfgruppe	23 February 1944*	Killed in action 26 December 1943	—
Karl-Friedrich Hoene	Heer	Leutnant of the Reserves	Leader of the 5./Grenadier-Regiment 755	26 November 1944	—	—
Werner Höner	Heer	Unteroffizier	Group leader in the 2./Pionier-Bataillon 245	30 September 1944*	Killed in action 5 September 1944	—
Justin Hönig	Heer	Feldwebel	Zugführer (platoon leader) in the 3./Panzergrenadier-Regiment 41	18 February 1945	—	—
Theodor Hönniger? (Note: Theodor Hönniger's nomination by his unit was received by the Heerespersonalamt (HPA—Army Staff Office) on 19 April 1945. There is no file card in the German Federal Archives. Major Joachim Domaschk approved and stated "Knight's Cross yes, 28 April". There is no evidence of the presentation. According to the Association of Knight's Cross Recipients (AKCR) the award was presented in accordance with the Dönitz-decree. This is illegal according to the Deutsche Dienststelle (WASt) and lacks legal justification. The presentation date was assigned by Walther-Peer Fellgiebel.)	Heer	Oberfeldwebel	Zugführer (platoon leader) in the 3./Panzer-Regiment 25	9 May 1945	—	—
Ignaz Graf von und zu Hoensbroech	Heer	Hauptmann	Commander of the II./Panzergrenadier-Regiment 4	4 June 1944	—	—
Johannes-Matthias Hönscheid	Luftwaffe	Oberfeldwebel	Kriegsberichterstatter der Fallschirmtruppe (Note: According to Scherzer on 16 March 1945 as Kriegsberichter der Fallschirmtruppe.)	12 March 1945	—	A man wearing a military uniform, side cap, various military decorations including an Iron Cross displayed at the front of his uniform collar.
Ahrend Höper	Heer	Leutnant of the Reserves	Zugführer (platoon leader) in the 1./Sturmgeschütz-Brigade 202	26 November 1944	—	—
Erich Hoepner? (Note: Erich Hoepner was deprived of all honours, ranks and orders and dishonourably discharged from the Heer on 8 January 1942. He was sentenced to death by the Volksgerichtshof and executed on 8 August 1944 in connection with the 20 July plot, a failed attempt to assassinate Adolf Hitler.)	Heer	General der Kavallerie	Commanding general of the XVI. Armeekorps	27 October 1939	—	A man wearing a military uniform, peaked cap, and an Iron Cross displayed at the front of his uniform collar.
Johann Hoering	Heer	Oberleutnant	Chief of the 2./Sturmgeschütz-Brigade 277	8 August 1944	—	—
Ludwig Hörl	Heer	Oberst	Commander of Gebirgsjäger-Regiment 91	6 April 1944	—	—
Willi Hörner	Luftwaffe	Leutnant	Staffelkapitän of the 9./Sturzkampfgeschwader 2 "Immelmann" (Note: According to Scherzer as a pilot in the 7./Sturzkampfgeschwader 2 "Immelmann".)	10 May 1943	—	—
Werner Hörnicke	Waffen-SS	SS-Sturmbannführer of the Reserves	Commander of the I./SS-Grenadier-Regiment 10 (motorized) in the 1. SS-Infanterie-Brigade (motorized) (Note: According to Scherzer as commander of the I./SS-Grenadier-Regiment (motorized) 10.)	1 December 1943	—	—
Reinhard Hörning	Heer	Hauptmann of the Reserves	Commander of the I./Grenadier-Regiment 546	22 August 1943*	Killed in action 17 October 1942	—
Walter Hörnlein+	Heer	Oberst	Commander of Infanterie-Regiment 80	30 July 1941	Awarded 213th Oak Leaves 15 March 1943	
Johann Hörstermann	Heer	Major	Commander of a Kampfgruppe in Grenadier-Regiment 473	28 March 1945	—	—
Anton Hörwick	Luftwaffe	Oberfeldwebel	Pilot in the 7./Nachtjagdgeschwader 2 (Note: According to Scherzer as pilot in the I./Nachtjagdgeschwader 7.)	8 August 1944	—	—
Hartmut von Hößlin	Heer	Hauptmann	Commander of the II./Artillerie-Regiment 7	17 April 1945	—	—
Roland von Hößlin? (Note: Roland von Hößlin, in connection with the 20 July plot, a failed attempt to assassinate Adolf Hitler, was deprived of all honours, ranks and orders and dishonourably discharged from the Heer on 14 September 1944. The civilian von Hößlin was sentenced to death by the Volksgerichtshof on 13 October 1944 and executed the same day.)	Heer	Hauptmann	Leader of Panzer-Aufklärungs-Abteilung 33	23 July 1942	—	—
Hans-Lothar Hoeth	Heer	Hauptmann	Commander of the I./Grenadier-Regiment 311	6 April 1944	—	—
Franz Hofbauer	Heer	Feldwebel	Zugführer (platoon leader) in the 3./Divisions-Füslier-Bataillon 72	20 January 1944	—	—
Karl Hofbauer	Heer	Hauptmann	Leader of the I./Infanterie-Regiment 154	7 August 1942	—	—
Karl Hofer	Heer	Unteroffizier	Zugführer (platoon leader) in the 3./Panzer-Jäger-Abteilung 49	26 October 1943	—	—
Lothar Hofer	Waffen-SS	SS-Sturmbannführer (Note: According to Scherzer as SS-Sturmbannführer and Major of the Schupo and commander of the III./SS-Artillerie-Regiment 54.)	Commander of the III./SS-Artillerie-Regiment 54 "Nederland"	5 April 1945	—	—
Carl Hoff? (Note: There is no reference of the Knight's Cross awarded to Carl Hoff in the archives of the Kriegsmarine. His personal file contains a copy of a letter from 1955 by the Deutsche Dienststelle (WASt), indicating that no proof of the award exists. Author Manfred Dörr states that Hoff received the Knight's Cross on 28 May 1945, thus after the capitulation. The date was assigned by Walther-Peer Fellgiebel.)	Kriegsmarine	Kapitänleutnant	Chief of the 1. Räumbootflottille	9 May 1945	—	—
Jakob Hoffend	Volkssturm (Heer)	Volkssturmmann (Note: According to Scherzer as NSDAP Ortsgruppenleiter (volunteering) in Cologne (for the defusing of bombs 1,892 without bomb disposal training).)	Feuerwerker und Bombenräumer in the Luftgau VI "Köln"	7 February 1945	—	—
Herbert von Hoffer (Note: According to Scherzer full name is Herbert von Hoffer-Sulmthal who received the Knight's Cross of the Iron Cross as Staffelführer in the II./Schlachtgeschwader 77.)	Luftwaffe	Leutnant	Staffelführer of the 5./Schlachtgeschwader 77	8 August 1944	—	—
Albert Hoffmann	Heer	Obergefreiter	Machine gunner in the 4./Kradschützen-Bataillon 55	3 April 1943	—	—
Ernst Hoffmann	Heer	Hauptmann of the Reserves	Chief of the 2./Grenadier-Regiment 698	4 May 1944	—	—
Ernst-Wilhelm Hoffmann+	Heer	Major	Chief of the 1./Schützen-Regiment 12	4 September 1940	Awarded 494th Oak Leaves 9 June 1944	—
Gerhard Hoffmann	Luftwaffe	Fahnenjunker-Feldwebel	Pilot in the 4./Jagdgeschwader 52 (Note: According to Scherzer as pilot in the 5./Jagdgeschwader 52.)	14 May 1944	—	—
Heinrich Hoffmann+	Luftwaffe	Oberfeldwebel	Pilot in the 12./Jagdgeschwader 51	12 August 1941	Awarded 36th Oak Leaves 19 October 1941	—
Heinrich Hoffmann+	Kriegsmarine	Korvettenkapitän	Chief of the 5. Torpedobootflottille	7 June 1944	Awarded 524th Oak Leaves 11 July 1944	—
Heinz-Joachim Hoffmann	Heer	Major	Commander of the III./Infanterie-Regiment 44	15 April 1942	—	—
Herbert Hoffmann	Heer	Oberfeldwebel	Leader of the 7./Grenadier-Regiment 426	15 April 1944	—	—
Dipl.-Ing. Kuno Hoffmann	Luftwaffe	Hauptmann	Gruppenkommandeur of the I.(K)/Lehrgeschwader 1 (Note: According to Scherzer as Gruppenkommandeur of the I./Lehrgeschwader 1.)	14 June 1941	—	—
Kurt Hoffmann	Heer	Feldwebel	Zugführer (platoon leader) in the 3.(motorized)/Pionier-Bataillon 28	8 June 1940	—	—
Kurt-Caesar Hoffmann	Kriegsmarine	Kapitän zur See	Commander of battleship Scharnhorst	21 March 1942	—	A man wearing a black naval military uniform, peaked cap, and an Iron Cross displayed at the front of his uniform collar.
Ludwig Hoffmann? (Note: Mr Meentz of the German Federal Archives stated on 20 July 2004 that it cannot be verified that Ludwig Hoffmann received the Knight's Cross. The presentation date was assigned by Fellgiebel. Ernst-Günther Krätschmer lists him on 9 May 1945. Hoffmann was a member of the Association of Knight's Cross Recipients (AKCR).)	Waffen-SS	SS-Hauptsturmführer	Leader of the III./SS-Panzergrenadier-Regiment 23 "Norge"	11 May 1945	—	—
Otto Hoffmann	Heer	Oberleutnant	Leader of the 3./Sturmgeschütz-Brigade 901 (Note: According to Scherzer as leader of the 3./Sturmgeschütz-Brigade 201.)	31 July 1942	—	—
Paul Hoffmann	Heer	Oberfeldwebel	Pioneer Zugführer (platoon leader) in the Stabskompanie/Grenadier-Regiment 211	2 March 1944	—	—
Reinhold Hoffmann	Luftwaffe	Leutnant (Note: According to Scherzer as Leutnant of the Reserves and pilot in the III./Jagdgeschwader 54.)	Pilot in the 6./Jagdgeschwader 54	28 January 1945*	Killed in flying accident 24 May 1944	—
Walter Hoffmann	Luftwaffe	Leutnant	Pilot in the 8./Schlachtgeschwader 1	16 June 1944	—	—
Werner Hoffmann	Luftwaffe	Hauptmann	Gruppenkommandeur of the I./Nachtjagdgeschwader 5	4 May 1944	—	—
Werner Hoffmann	Luftwaffe	Hauptmann	Staffelkapitän of the 1./Schlachtgeschwader 1	8 August 1944	—	—
Günther Hoffmann-Schönborn+	Heer	Major	Commander of Sturmgeschütz-Abteilung 191	14 May 1941	Awarded 49th Oak Leaves 31 December 1941	—
Otto Hoffmann von Waldau	Luftwaffe	Generalleutnant	Fliegerführer Afrika	28 June 1942	—	
Edmund Hoffmeister	Heer	Generalmajor	Commander of the 383. Infanterie-Division	6 October 1943	—	—
Heinrich Hoffmeister	Heer	Major	Leader of Grenadier-Regiment 915	31 January 1945	—	—
Henning Hoffmeister	Heer	Major	Deputy leader of Grenadier-Regiment 6	30 September 1944	—	—
Hans Hoffritz	Heer	Feldwebel	Zugführer (platoon leader) in the 14.(Panzerjäger)/Infanterie-Regiment 268 (Note: According to Scherzer as Zugführer (platoon leader) in the 14./Infanterie-Regiment 268.)	4 September 1941	—	—
Adolf Hofmann	Heer	Oberleutnant	Chief of the 6./Gebirgsjäger-Regiment 100	15 November 1941	—	—
Bernhard Hofmann	Heer	Major of the Reserves	Commander of the I./Infanterie-Regiment 427	26 September 1942	—	—
Horst Hofmann	Kriegsmarine	Obersteuermann	Coxswain and watch officer on U-672	20 May 1944	—	—
Karl-Joachim Hofmann	Heer	Hauptmann	Leader of the I./Panzergrenadier-Regiment 108	4 July 1944	—	—
Karl-Wilhelm Hofmann	Luftwaffe	Leutnant	Pilot in the 8./Jagdgeschwader 26 "Schlageter" (Note: According to Scherzer as Staffelkapitän in the II./Jagdgeschwader 26.)	24 October 1944	—	—
Paul Hofmann? (Note: Paul Hofmann's nomination by his unit was received by the Heerespersonalamt (HPA—Army Staff Office) on 30 March 1945. Missing were the approvals of all intermediate commanding officers. An identical nomination, which had been approved by the Reichsführer SS, was received on 13 April. This nomination was approved by Major Joachim Domaschk on 30 April 1945. A Heerespersonalamt-Verleihungsvorschlag (HPA-VV—Army Staff Office Nomination Recommendation) was not created. There is no evidence of the presentation. Two file cards are in the German Federal Archives, a contemporary with an entry date 30 March 1945, and one created by the Federal Ministry of Defence in the 1960s for the 13 April 1945. Both file cards note "unfinished" in the presentation field. According to the Association of Knight's Cross Recipients (AKCR) the award was presented in accordance with the Dönitz-decree. This is illegal according to the Deutsche Dienststelle (WASt) and lacks legal justification. The presentation date was assigned by Walther-Peer Fellgiebel.)	Heer	Leutnant	Leader of the 6./Grenadier-Regiment 352	9 May 1945	—	—
Rudolf Hofmann	Heer	General der Infanterie	Chief of the General Staff Heeresgruppe Nord (Note: According to Scherzer as chief of the General Staff Oberbefehlshaber Nordwest.)	7 May 1945	—	—
Willy Hofmann	Luftwaffe	Oberfeldwebel	Pilot in the 2./Nahaufklärungs-Gruppe 5	12 March 1945	—	—
Richard Hofsäss	Luftwaffe	Hauptmann	Staffelkapitän of the 1./Nahaufklärungs-Gruppe 2	9 January 1945	—	—
Hermann Hogeback+	Luftwaffe	Oberleutnant	Staffelkapitän of the 9.(K)/Lehrgeschwader 1 (Note: According to Scherzer as Staffelkapitän of the 8.(K)/Lehrgeschwader 1.)	8 September 1941	Awarded 192nd Oak Leaves 19 February 1943; 125th Swords 26 January 1945	—
Heinrich Hogrebe+	Heer	Oberleutnant of the Reserves	Chief of the 5./Infanterie-Regiment 422	17 August 1942	Awarded 454th Oak Leaves 13 April 1944	—
Erich Hohagen	Luftwaffe	Oberleutnant	Staffelkapitän of the 4./Jagdgeschwader 51 (Note: According to Scherzer on 6 October 1941 as leader of the II./Jagdgeschwader 51.)	5 October 1941	—	—
Werner Hohen-Hinnebusch	Luftwaffe	Leutnant	Leader of the 3.(gemischte)/Flak-Abteilung 442 (Note: According to Scherzer as leader of the 3./gemischte Flak-Abteilung 442 (deployable).)	11 February 1945	—	—
Richard Hohenhausen	Heer	Oberleutnant of the Reserves	Chief of the 2./Sturmgeschütz-Abteilung 184 (Note: According to Scherzer as chief of the 3./Sturmgeschütz-Abteilung 184.)	11 May 1942	—	—
Oskar Freiherr von Hohenhausen? (Note: Oskar Freiherr von Hohenhausen und Hochhaus's nomination by his unit was sent to the Heerespersonalamt (HPA—Army Staff Office) on 15 May 1945 as a teleprinter message. The HPA received the message on 16 May 1945. Major Joachim Domaschk noted: "not processed". The presentation date was assigned by Walther-Peer Fellgiebel. Hohenhausen und Hochhaus was a member of the Association of Knight's Cross Recipients (AKCR).)	Heer	Oberstleutnant	Commander of Panzergrenadier-Regiment 9	11 May 1945	—	—
Hans Hohmann	Heer	Oberleutnant of the Reserves	Leader of the I./Panzer-Regiment 31 (Note: According to Scherzer as leader of the 1./Panzer-Regiment 31.)	5 March 1945*	Killed in action 21 January 1945	—
Heinrich Hohmeier? (Note: Heinrich Hohmeier's nomination by his unit was received by the Heerespersonalamt (HPA—Army Staff Office) on 28 April 1945 (the file card states an entry date of 10 April 1945, which is the creation date of his unit). His presentation is not listed in the book "Verliehene Ritterkreuze" (Awarded Knight Crosses). There is no evidence that the nomination was approved or further processed. According to the Association of Knight's Cross Recipients (AKCR) the award was presented in accordance with the Dönitz-decree. This is illegal according to the Deutsche Dienststelle (WASt) and lacks legal justification. The presentation date was assigned by Walther-Peer Fellgiebel.)	Heer	Feldwebel	Zugführer (platoon leader) in the Stabskompanie/Grenadier-Regiment 994	9 May 1945	—	—
Walter Hohmuth	Heer	Oberfeldwebel	Leader of the 7./Panzergrenadier-Regiment 6	14 May 1944	—	—
Dr. rer. pol. Hermann Hohn+	Heer	Oberst	Deputy leader of the 72. Infanterie-Division (Note: According to Scherzer as leader of the 72. Infanterie-Division.)	28 November 1943	Awarded 410th Oak Leaves 1 March 1944; 109th Swords 31 October 1944	—
Alfred Hohoff	Heer	Hauptmann	Commander of the II./Grenadier-Regiment 1084	10 February 1945	—	—
Alfred Hoinka	Heer	Hauptmann	Leader of Panzer-Zerstörer-Abteilung 156	11 March 1945*	Killed in action 26 January 1945	—
Walter Hollaender	Heer	Oberstleutnant	Commander of Sturm-Regiment 195	18 July 1943	—	—
Alexander Holle	Luftwaffe	Oberst	Fliegerführer Nord (Note: According to Scherzer on 30 December 1942 as Fliegerführer Nord and Geschwaderkommodore of Kampfgeschwader 26.)	23 December 1942	—	Black-and-white photo of a man wearing military uniform with various military decorations including an Iron Cross at his neck.
Georg Holle	Luftwaffe	Oberleutnant	Staffelführer of the 2./Kampfgeschwader 51	3 April 1943*	Killed in action 27 February 1943	—
Josef Hollekamp	Heer	Obergefreiter	Group leader in the 2.(Radfahr)/Aufklärungs-Abteilung 36 (Note: According to Scherzer as group leader in the 2./Aufklärungs-Abteilung 36.)	23 July 1943	—	—
Heinrich Hollenweger	Heer	Oberleutnant	Chief of the 8./Panzergrenadier-Regiment 108	1 November 1942	—	—
Alfred Holler	Heer	Major	Deputy leader of Grenadier-Regiment 426	5 April 1944	—	—
Josef Hollermeier? (Note: Josef Hollermeier's Heerespersonalamt-Verleihungsvorschlag (HPA-VV—Army Staff Office Nomination Recommendation) was forwarded and approved by Adolf Hitler on 18 December 1944. The HPA received notice via the command chain shortly after 18 December that Hollermeier was missing in action. Subsequently the presentation, in accordance with regulation, was put on hold and it was to be ruled over again after the war. The presentation date was struck from the file card and a note was added indicating that Hollermeier was missing in action. He was also struck from the Knight's Cross recommendation book, which had listed him with entry number 4232. The presentation date was assigned by Walther-Peer Fellgiebel.)	Heer	Major	Leader of Grenadier-Regiment 1213	9 May 1945	—	—
Karl-Adolf Hollidt+	Heer	Generalleutnant	Commander of the 50. Infanterie-Division	8 September 1941	Awarded 239th Oak Leaves 17 May 1943	
Ernst Hollmann? (Note: Ernst Hollmann's nomination by the Außenstelle of the Heerespersonalamt (HPA/A—Branch of the Army Staff Office) was ready for signature at the end of the war. According to the Association of Knight's Cross Recipients (AKCR) the award was presented in accordance with the Dönitz-decree. This is illegal according to the Deutsche Dienststelle (WASt) and lacks legal justification. The presentation date was assigned by Walther-Peer Fellgiebel.)	Heer	Hauptmann of the Reserves	Commander of the II./Grenadier-Regiment 1221	9 May 1945	—	—
Max Holm	Heer	Oberwachtmeister	Assault gun commander in the II./Panzer-Regiment Führer-Begleit Division	19 January 1945	—	—
Norbert Holm	Heer	Oberst	Commander of Infanterie-Regiment 156 (motorized)	20 December 1941	—	—
Waldemar Holst	Kriegsmarine	Korvettenkapitän	Chief of the 4. Räumbootsflottille	3 December 1942	—	—
Rudolf Holste+	Heer	Oberst	Commander of Artillerie-Regiment 73	6 April 1942	Awarded 561st Oak Leaves 27 August 1944	—
Johann Holstein	Heer	Obergefreiter	Messenger in the 2./Grenadier-Regiment 698	16 October 1944	—	—
Josef Holte	Waffen-SS	SS-Oberscharführer of the Reserves (Note: According to Scherzer as SS-Oberscharführer and Zugführer (platoon leader) in the 2./SS-Panzer-Regiment 9.)	Zugführer (platoon leader) in the 2./SS-Panzer-Regiment 9 "Hohenstaufen"	27 August 1944*	Killed in action 20 August 1944	—
August Holz	Heer	Feldwebel	Zugführer (platoon leader) in the 7./Grenadier-Regiment 16	18 December 1944	—	—
Günther Holz	Heer	Rittmeister of the Reserves	Chief of the 3./Panzer-Jäger-Abteilung 258	6 April 1943	—	—
Hermann Holz	Heer	Oberfeldwebel	Leader of the 3./Grenadier-Regiment 9	14 April 1945	—	—
Egon Holzapfel	Heer	Oberleutnant of the Reserves	Regiment adjutant in Grenadier-Regiment 2 (Note: According to Scherzer as adjutant in Grenadier-Regiment 2.)	14 August 1943	—	—
Hans Holzapfel	Heer	Oberfeldwebel	Zugführer (platoon leader) in the 11./Grenadier-Regiment 316	6 April 1944	—	—
Karl-Heinz Holzapfel	Heer	Hauptmann	Commander of Pionier-Bataillon 29 (motorized)	11 September 1943	—	—
Friedrich Holzer	Waffen-SS	SS-Hauptsturmführer	Chief of the 1./SS-Panzer-Regiment 2 "Das Reich" (Note: According to Scherzer as chief of the 1./SS-Panzer-Regiment 2.)	10 December 1943	—	—
Fritz Holzhäuer	Heer	Major	Commander of the III./Panzer-Regiment 29	6 August 1941	—	—
Anton Holzinger	Heer	Major	Commander of the I./Gebirgsjäger-Regiment 138	11 January 1941	—	—
Franz Holzinger	Heer	Leutnant of the Reserves	Zugführer (platoon leader) in the 1./Gebirgs-Panzer-Jäger-Abteilung 95	13 April 1944	—	—
Leopold Holzmann	Heer	Hauptmann	Commander of the I./Grenadier-Regiment 1059	16 November 1944	—	—
Walter Hombitzer	Heer	Hauptmann	Commander of the III./Volks-Artillerie-Korps 405	30 April 1945	—	—
Heinrich Homburg	Heer	Hauptmann	Leader of the II./Jäger-Regiment 83	25 July 1944	—	—
Friedrich von Homeyer	Heer	Rittmeister (Note: According to Scherzer as Rittmeister of the Reserves and chief of Aufklärungs-Kompanie 580.)	Leader of the gemischte Aufklärungs-Kompanie 580 in the 90. leichte Afrika-Division	6 July 1942*	Killed in action 3 July 1942	—
Gerhard Homuth	Luftwaffe	Oberleutnant	Staffelkapitän of the 3./Jagdgeschwader 27	14 June 1941	—	—
Günter Honnefeller	Luftwaffe	Leutnant	Staffelführer of the 7./Schlachtgeschwader 10 (Note: According to Scherzer as pilot in the 7./Schlachtgeschwader 10.)	17 October 1944	—	—
Werner Honsberg	Luftwaffe	Oberfeldwebel	Pilot in the 1./Schlachtgeschwader 77	20 July 1944	—	—
Theodor Hopf	Heer	Oberleutnant	Chief of the 1.(Radfahr)/Infanterie-Regiment 170 (Note: According to Scherzer as chief of the 1./Infanterie-Regiment 170.)	21 September 1941	—	—
Willi Hopfe	Heer	Obergefreiter	Group leader in the 5./Schnelle Abteilung 123	15 January 1943	—	—
Gerhard Hoppe	Heer	Unteroffizier	Vorgeschobener Beobachter (forward observer) in the 9./Artillerie-Regiment 81	4 July 1944	—	—
Gerhard Hoppe	Heer	Major	Commander of Sturmgeschütz-Brigade 279	29 November 1944*	Killed in action 18 October 1944	—
Hans Hoppe? (Note: Hans Hoppe's nomination by his unit was processed by the Oberkommando der Luftwaffe/Auszeichnung und Disziplin (OKL/AuD—Air Force High Command/Award and Discipline) on 16 April 1945. This nomination, now recommending approval, was forwarded on 17 April with a Luftwaffenpersonalamt-Verleihungsvorschlag (LPA-VV—Air Force Staff Office Nomination Recommendation) Nr. 1578 to the adjutancy of Hermann Göring. The nomination was never finalized and was left unfinished by the end of the war. A presentation of the Knight's Cross of the Iron Cross cannot be verified. The presentation date was assigned by Walther-Peer Fellgiebel.)	Luftwaffe	Major	Commander of the II./Flak-Regiment 46 (motorized)	8 May 1945	—	—
Harry Hoppe+	Heer	Oberst	Commander of Infanterie-Regiment 424	12 September 1941	Awarded 682nd Oak Leaves 18 December 1944	—
Johannes Hoppe	Heer	Oberstleutnant	Leader of Panzergrenadier-Regiment 12	26 October 1943	—	—
Wolf-Horst Hoppe	Heer	Major	Commander of schwere (heavy) Panzer-Jäger-Abteilung 519	15 July 1944	—	—
Erich Horak	Heer	Oberfeldwebel	Zugführer (platoon leader) in the 6./Füsilier-Regiment 68	24 September 1943	—	—
Max Horlbeck	Heer	Major	Commander of the II./Grenadier-Regiment 435	12 August 1944	—	—
Hans Hormann	Luftwaffe	Oberfeldwebel	Observer in the 1./Kampfgeschwader 100	5 December 1943	—	—
Gerhard Horn	Heer	Oberwachtmeister	Zugführer (platoon leader) in the 2.(Radfahr)/Divisions-Füsilier-Bataillon (A.A.) 218 (Note: According to Scherzer as Zugführer (platoon leader) in the 2./Divisions-Füsilier-Bataillon (A.A.) 218.)	23 August 1944	—	—
Karl Horn	Heer	Leutnant	Leader of the 6./Grenadier-Regiment 587	10 February 1944	—	—
Walter Hornung	Luftwaffe	Major	Gruppenkommandeur of the III./Transportgeschwader 2	9 June 1944	—	—
Herbert Horten	Heer	Leutnant of the Reserves	Chief of the 12./Artillerie-Regiment 81	2 September 1943	—	—
Kurt Hortian	Luftwaffe	Oberstleutnant	Commander of Flak-Regiment 133 (motorized) (Note: According to Scherzer as leader of Flak-Regiment (provisionally motorized) 133.)	18 November 1944	—	—
Siegfried Hortmeyer	Heer	Oberleutnant	Company chief in Grenadier-Regiment 130	14 February 1945	—	—
Friedrich Hoßbach+	Heer	Oberst	Commander of Infanterie-Regiment 82	7 October 1940	Awarded 298th Oak Leaves 11 September 1943	
Hans Hoßfeld+	Kriegsmarine	Kapitänleutnant (M.A.)	Commander of Marine-Artillerie Abteilung 531	6 October 1944	Awarded 659th Oak Leaves 25 November 1944	—
Hermann Hoth+	Heer	General der Infanterie	Commanding general of the XV. Armeekorps	27 October 1939	Awarded 25th Oak Leaves 17 July 1941; 35th Swords 15 September 1943	A man in military uniform wearing an Iron Cross at his neck.
Theodor Hotzy	Heer	Wachtmeister	Zugführer (platoon leader) in the 3./Divisions-Füsilier-Bataillon (A.A.) 7	9 June 1944	—	—
Rudolf von Houten	Heer	Oberfeldwebel	Leader of the 1./Feld-Ersatz-Bataillon 1 (56. Infanterie-Division) (Note: According to Scherzer as leader of the 1./Feld-Ersatz-Bataillon 1.)	5 April 1945	—	—
Adolf Hoyer	Heer	Oberleutnant of the Reserves	Chief of the 4./Panzer-Aufklärungs-Abteilung 120	8 October 1943	—	—
Ludwig Hoyer	Heer	Hauptmann of the Reserves	Commander of the III./Grenadier-Regiment 278	23 February 1944	—	—
Paul-Werner Hozzel+	Luftwaffe	Hauptmann	Gruppenkommandeur of the I./Sturzkampfgeschwader 1	8 May 1940	Awarded 230th Oak Leaves 14 April 1943	
Dietrich Hrabak+	Luftwaffe	Hauptmann	Gruppenkommandeur of the II./Jagdgeschwader 54	21 October 1940	Awarded 337th Oak Leaves 25 November 1943	
Franz Hrdlicka	Luftwaffe	Hauptmann	Staffelkapitän of the 5./Jagdgeschwader 77 (Note: According to Scherzer on 18 October 1944 as Staffelkapitän in the II./Jagdgeschwader 77.)	9 August 1944	—	—
Martin Hrustak+	Heer	Oberfeldwebel	Zugführer (platoon leader) in the 7./Grenadier-Regiment 162	11 December 1943	Awarded 473rd Oak Leaves 14 May 1944	—
Hans Hube+	Heer	Generalmajor	Commander of the 16. Panzer-Division	1 August 1941	Awarded 62nd Oak Leaves 16 January 1942; 22nd Swords 21 December 1942; 13th Diamonds 20 April 1944	
Gustav Huber	Heer	Hauptmann	Commander of the I./Artillerie-Regiment 115	26 November 1944	—	—
Josef Huber	Luftwaffe	Oberfeldwebel	Pilot in the 8./Schlachtgeschwader 77	20 July 1944	—	—
Karl Huber	Heer	Feldwebel	Stoßtruppführer (shock troops leader) in Aufklärungs-Abteilung 20 (motorized)	30 July 1940	—	—
Siegfried Huber	Luftwaffe	Oberfeldwebel	Pilot in the 7./Sturzkampfgeschwader 2 "Immelmann"	3 April 1943*	Killed in action 19 January 1943	—
Dr. jur. Alfred Ritter von Hubicki Hubicki	Heer	Generalleutnant	Commander of the 9. Panzer-Division	20 April 1941	—	
Helmut Hudel+	Heer	Hauptmann	Chief of the 1./Panzer-Regiment 7	27 May 1942	Awarded 219th Oak Leaves 2 April 1943	A black-and-white photograph of a man wearing a military uniform, side cap and a neck order in shape of an Iron Cross.
Karl Hübbe	Heer	Hauptmann	Commander of the I./Grenadier-Regiment 270	31 March 1943	—	—
Alois Hübner	Heer	Oberfeldwebel	Zugführer (platoon leader) in the I./Panzergrenadier-Regiment 129	5 December 1943	—	—
Arnold Huebner	Luftwaffe	Gefreiter	Richtkanonier (gunner) in the 3./Flak-Regiment 33 (motorized) in the DAK (Note: According to Scherzer as Richtkanonier (gunner) in the 3./Flak-Regiment (motorized) 33.)	7 March 1942	—	—
Eduard Hübner	Luftwaffe	Hauptmann	Commander of Sturm-Bataillon Fallschirm AOK 1 (Note: According to Scherzer as commander of Sturm-Bataillon of the 1. Fallschirm-Armee.)	17 March 1945	—	Black-and-white photo of a smiling, sitting man in military uniform.
Ekhard Hübner	Luftwaffe	Leutnant	Pilot in the III./Jagdgeschwader 3 "Udet"	3 May 1942*	Killed in action 28 March 1942	—
Ernst-August Hübner	Heer	Hauptmann (Note: According to Scherzer as Oberleutnant and chief of the 12./Grenadier-Regiment 122.)	Chief of the 12.(MG)/Grenadier-Regiment 122	9 December 1943*	Killed in action 7 November 1943	—
Herbert Hübner	Heer	Feldwebel	Zugführer (platoon leader) in the 1./Panzer-Jäger-Abteilung 171	28 October 1944	—	—
Dr. med.dent. Rudolf Hübner	Heer	Generalmajor (Note: According to Scherzer as Oberstleutnant and leader of Grenadier-Regiment 529 [Actions near Orel 1942 or 1943].)	Leader of Grenadier-Regiment 529	9 March 1945	—	—
Walter Hübner	Heer	Unteroffizier	Vorgeschobener Beobachter (forward observer) in the 3./Artillerie-Regiment 28	18 February 1945	—	—
Wilhelm Hübner	Luftwaffe	Leutnant	Pilot in the Stabsstaffel/Jagdgeschwader 51 "Mölders"	28 February 1945	—	—
Anton Hübsch	Luftwaffe	Oberfeldwebel	Pilot in the 2./Schlachtgeschwader 2 "Immelmann" (Note: According to Scherzer as pilot in the I./Schlachtgeschwader 2 "Immelmann".)	8 August 1944	—	—
Erich Hübscher	Heer	Unteroffizier	Group leader in the 7./Grenadier-Regiment 914	23 August 1944	—	—
Ernst-Albrecht Hückel	Heer	Hauptmann	Commander of Panzer-Pionier-Bataillon "Großdeutschland"	27 September 1943	—	—
Hermann Hüfing	Heer	Feldwebel	Zugführer (platoon leader) in the 8./Grenadier-Regiment 1076	23 October 1944	—	—
Werner Hühner	Heer	Generalleutnant	Commander of the 61. Infanterie-Division	18 April 1943	—	—
Dr. med. Heinrich Hüls	Heer	Oberarzt (rank equivalent to Oberleutnant)	Hilfsarzt (assistant doctor) in the II./Panzer-Regiment 11	21 September 1944*	Killed in action 16 August 1944	—
Bernhard Hülsmann	Luftwaffe	Unteroffizier	Gun leader in the 8./Flak-Regiment 4 (motorized)	22 January 1943	—	—
Dr. rer. pol. Hans-Franz von Hülst	Heer	Major of the Reserves	Leader of Grenadier-Regiment 378	9 February 1943	—	—
Willi Hümmerich	Heer	Leutnant of the Reserves	Zugführer (platoon leader) in the 14.(Panzerjäger)/Infanterie-Regiment 80 (Note: According to Scherzer as Zugführer (platoon leader) in the 14./Infanterie-Regiment 80.)	18 October 1941	—	—
Otto Hünemörder	Heer	Unteroffizier	Gun leader in the 14.(Panzerjäger)/Infanterie-Regiment 309 (Note: According to Scherzer as gun leader in the 14./Infanterie-Regiment 309.)	16 April 1943	—	—
Walther von Hünersdorff+	Heer	Oberst	Commander of Panzer-Regiment 11	22 December 1942	Awarded 259th Oak Leaves 14 July 1943	A black-and-white photograph of a man wearing a dark military uniform, side cap and a neck order in shape of an Iron Cross.
Georg Hünger	Heer	Oberleutnant (Note: According to Scherzer as Oberleutnant of the Reserves.)	Leader of the I./Panzergrenadier-Regiment 26	6 October 1944*	Killed in action 26 August 1944	—
Hermann Hüttebräucker? (Note: No evidence regarding the presentation of the Knight's Cross of the Iron Cross to Hermann Hüttebräucker can be found in the German Federal Archives. According to Walther-Peer Fellgiebel the presentation was made by Feldmarschall Ferdinand Schörner, who had been empowered on 3 May 1945 to do so. This reasoning was replicated by Von Seemen. The order commission of the Association of Knight's Cross Recipients (AKCR) files dating 1971 to 1984 do not mention to have processed Hüttebräucker's case. Author Veit Scherzer states that he has a photocopy of Hüttebräucker's paybook, which is in the possession of a private collector. The paybook contains two typewriter written sheets of paper, attached with a paperclip, indicating that the presentation was made on 18 March 1945. According to Scherzer these paper sheets are not authentic. Additionally the paybook contains further inconsistencies. A letter dated 18 March 1945, congratulating Hüttebräucker, written by the divisional commander General Remer, shows the insignia of a Commander-in-Chief of an Army Group, and not those of a divisional commander.)	Heer	Hauptmann	Teacher at the Panzertruppenschule Milowitz at Prague	6 May 1945	—	—
[Dr.] Karl Hütten	Luftwaffe	Hauptmann of the Reserves	Staffelkapitän of the 5.(F)/Aufklärungs-Gruppe 122 (Note: According to Scherzer as Staffelkapitän of the Aufklärungsstaffel 5.(F)/122.)	24 October 1944	—	—
Theodor Hütten	Heer	Oberleutnant	Leader of Divisions Versorgungs-Kolonne 349. Infanterie-Division	14 April 1945	—	—
Hans Hüttner	Heer	Oberst	Commander of Infanterie-Regiment 520	4 September 1942	—	—
Hartmut Hüttner	Heer	Hauptmann	Commander of the III./Jäger-Regiment 228	15 March 1943	—	—
Leopold von Hütz	Heer	Hauptmann	Commander of the III./Grenadier-Regiment 1054	5 September 1944	—	—
Helmuth Hufenbach+	Heer	Oberstleutnant	Commander of Grenadier-Regiment 667	30 October 1943	Awarded 807th Oak Leaves 28 March 1945	—
Heinz Huffmann	Heer	Major	Commander of Sturmgeschütz-Abteilung 201	14 April 1943	—	—
Helmuth Huffmann	Heer	Generalleutnant	Commander of the 62. Infanterie-Division	30 September 1943	—	—
Eduard Hug	Heer	Obergefreiter	Machine gunner in the 1./Jäger-Regiment 75	2 September 1944	—	—
Kurt Huhn	Luftwaffe	Hauptmann	Gruppenkommandeur of the II./Schlachtgeschwader 77 (Note: According to Scherzer as Gruppenkommandeur of the II./Sturzkampfgeschwader 77.)	17 March 1943	—	—
Alois Hulha	Luftwaffe	Oberleutnant	Pilot in the 6./Kampfgeschwader 53 "Legion Condor"	17 March 1945	—	—
Otto Hulsch	Luftwaffe	Oberleutnant	Pilot in the 8./Schlachtgeschwader 1 (Note: According to Scherzer as pilot in the 8./Sturzkampfgeschwader 1.)	5 February 1944	—	—
August Humke	Heer	Wachtmeister	Zugführer (platoon leader) in the 4./Divisions-Füsilier-Bataillon (A.A.) 15	4 May 1944	—	—
Fritz Hummel	Luftwaffe	Hauptmann of the Reserves	Commander of Jagdverband Leitstelle West (Frontaufklärungs-Verband II. West) (Note: According to Scherzer as commander of Leitstelle für Frontaufklärung II West.)	19 October 1944	—	—
Kurt Hummel	Heer	Oberst	Commander of Grenadier-Regiment 124	15 May 1944	—	—
Willi Hund	Waffen-SS	SS-Obersturmführer	Leader of a Kampfgruppe z.b.V. of the 6. and 7./SS-Freiwilligen-Panzergrenadier-Regiment 23 "Norge" (Note: According to Scherzer on 20 April 1945 as leader of 7./SS-Panzergrenadier-Regiment 23 "Norge" (Norwegian Nr. 1) and leader of a Kampfgruppe from 6. and 7./23.)	11 May 1945	—	—
Joachim Hundert	Heer	Leutnant of the Reserves	Leader of the 5./Grenadier-Regiment 124	15 January 1943	—	
[Dr.] Gerhard Hundertmark	Luftwaffe	Oberleutnant	Chief of the 1./gemischte Flak-Sturm-Abteilung 802 (deployable)	22 December 1944	—	—
Gustav Hundt	Heer	Generalleutnant	Commander of the 1. Ski-Jäger-Division	15 April 1945	—	—
Hans-Joachim Hunger	Heer	Leutnant of the Reserves	Battery officer in the schwere (heavy) Artillerie-Abteilung 526 (motorized)	9 April 1944	—	—
Heinrich Hunger	Luftwaffe	Leutnant	Pilot in the Stabsstaffel/Kampfgeschwader 2	5 July 1941	—	—
Richard Huntemüller	Heer	Oberleutnant	Chief of the 2./leichte Flak-Sturm-Abteilung 76 (motorized)	5 September 1944	—	—
Konrad Hupfer+	Heer	Hauptmann	Chief of the 14./Infanterie-Regiment 72	21 September 1941	Awarded 136th Oak Leaves 28 October 1942	—
Helmut Huppert	Heer	Major	Commander of Panzer-Aufklärungs-Abteilung 1	23 August 1944	—	—
Herbert Huppertz+	Luftwaffe	Leutnant	Pilot in the 12./Jagdgeschwader 51	30 August 1941	Awarded 512th Oak Leaves 24 June 1944	
Georg Hurdelbrink	Waffen-SS	SS-Obersturmführer	Leader of the 1./SS-Panzer-Jäger-Abteilung 12 "Hitlerjugend" (Note: According to Scherzer as leader of the 1./SS-Panzer-Jäger-Abteilung 12.)	16 October 1944	—	—
August Hurlebaus	Heer	Obergefreiter	Richtschütze (gunner) in the 2./schwere (heavy) Panzer-Jäger-Abteilung 665	23 February 1944	—	—
Wilhelm Hurrle	Heer	Unteroffizier	Vorgeschobener Beobachter (forward observer) in the 13./Grenadier-Regiment 358	17 March 1945	—	—
Werner Husemann	Luftwaffe	Major	Gruppenkommandeur of the I./Nachtjagdgeschwader 3	30 September 1944	—	—
Freimut Husenett	Heer	Oberleutnant	Chief of the 2./Grenadier-Regiment 7	28 October 1944	—	—
Walter Huß	Heer	Hauptmann of the Reserves	Commander of the I./Artillerie-Regiment 240 (motorized) (Note: According to Scherzer as commander of the I./Artillerie-Regiment 240.)	21 September 1944	—	—
Joachim-Friedrich Huth	Luftwaffe	Oberstleutnant	Geschwaderkommodore of Zerstörergeschwader 26 "Horst Wessel"	11 September 1940	—	—
Wolf-Dietrich Huy+	Luftwaffe	Oberleutnant	Staffelkapitän of the 7./Jagdgeschwader 77	5 July 1941	Awarded 83rd Oak Leaves 17 March 1942	—
Hans Huzel	Heer	Major	Leader of Sturm-Regiment 215	18 February 1945	—	—
Josef Hyza	Heer	Major	Deputy leader of Grenadier-Regiment 579	9 June 1944	—	—
