= List of Knight's Cross of the Iron Cross with Oak Leaves recipients (1944) =

The Knight's Cross of the Iron Cross (Ritterkreuz des Eisernen Kreuzes) and its variants were the highest awards in the military and paramilitary forces of Nazi Germany during World War II. This decoration was awarded for a wide range of reasons and across all ranks, from a senior commander for skilled leadership of his troops in battle to a low-ranking soldier for a single act of extreme gallantry. The Knight's Cross of the Iron Cross with Oak Leaves (Ritterkreuz des Eisernen Kreuzes mit Eichenlaub) was introduced on 3 June 1940 to further distinguish those who had already received the Knight's Cross of the Iron Cross and who continued to show merit in combat bravery or military success. A total of 7 awards were made in 1940; 50 in 1941; 111 in 1942; 192 in 1943; 328 in 1944, and 194 in 1945, giving a total of 882 recipients—excluding the 8 foreign recipients of the award.

The number of 882 Oak Leaves recipients is based on the analysis and acceptance of the order commission of the Association of Knight's Cross Recipients (AKCR). However, author Veit Scherzer has challenged the validity of 27 of these listings. With the exception of Hermann Fegelein, all of the disputed recipients had received the award in 1945, when the deteriorating situation during the final days of World War II in Germany left a number of nominations incomplete and pending in various stages of the approval process. Fegelein received the Oak Leaves in 1942, but was sentenced to death by Adolf Hitler and executed by SS-Gruppenführer Johann Rattenhuber's Reichssicherheitsdienst (RSD) on 28 April 1945 after a court-martial led by SS-Brigadeführer and Generalmajor of the Waffen-SS Wilhelm Mohnke. The sentence was carried out the same day. The death sentence, according to German law, resulted in the loss of all orders and honorary signs.

== Background ==
The Knight's Cross of the Iron Cross and its higher grades were based on four separate enactments. The first enactment, Reichsgesetzblatt I S. 1573 of 1 September 1939 instituted the Iron Cross (Eisernes Kreuz), the Knight's Cross of the Iron Cross and the Grand Cross of the Iron Cross (Großkreuz des Eisernen Kreuzes). Article 2 of the enactment mandated that the award of a higher class be preceded by the award of all preceding classes. As the war progressed, some of the recipients of the Knight's Cross distinguished themselves further and a higher grade, the Oak Leaves to the Knight's Cross of the Iron Cross, was instituted. The Oak Leaves, as they were commonly referred to, were based on the enactment Reichsgesetzblatt I S. 849 of 3 June 1940. In 1941, two higher grades of the Knight's Cross were instituted. The enactment Reichsgesetzblatt I S. 613 of 28 September 1941 introduced the Knight's Cross of the Iron Cross with Oak Leaves and Swords (Ritterkreuz des Eisernen Kreuzes mit Eichenlaub und Schwertern) and the Knight's Cross of the Iron Cross with Oak Leaves, Swords and Diamonds (Ritterkreuz des Eisernen Kreuzes mit Eichenlaub, Schwertern und Brillanten). At the end of 1944 the final grade, the Knight's Cross of the Iron Cross with Golden Oak Leaves, Swords, and Diamonds (Ritterkreuz des Eisernen Kreuzes mit goldenem Eichenlaub, Schwertern und Brillanten), based on the enactment Reichsgesetzblatt 1945 I S. 11 of 29 December 1944, became the final variant of the Knight's Cross authorized.

== Recipients of 1944 ==
Knight's Cross of the Iron Cross with Oak Leaves
Year	Number of presentations	Posthumous presentations
1940	7	0
1941	50	3
1942	111	7
1943	192	17
1944	328	46
1945	194	19

The Oberkommando der Wehrmacht (Supreme Command of the Armed Forces) kept separate Knight's Cross lists, one for each of the three military branches, Heer (Army), Kriegsmarine (Navy), Luftwaffe (Air force) and for the Waffen-SS. Within each of these lists a unique sequential number was assigned to each recipient. The same numbering paradigm was applied to the higher grades of the Knight's Cross, one list per grade. Of the 328 awards made in 1944, 46 presentations were made posthumously. Heer members received 198 of the medals, 13 went to the Kriegsmarine, 90 to the Luftwaffe, and 27 to the Waffen-SS.

The Knight's Cross of the Iron Cross with Oak Leaves and Swords was awarded to 46 of the 328 Oak Leaves recipients of 1944. Out of these 46 presentations, Veit Scherzer disputed eight of them for reasons associated to the deteriorating situation of Germany during the final days of World War II. The sequential numbers greater than 143 for the Knight's Cross of the Iron Cross with Oak Leaves and Swords are unofficial and were assigned by the Association of Knight's Cross Recipients (AKCR) and are therefore denoted in parentheses. The recipients are ordered and numbered chronologically. The rank listed is the recipient's rank at the time the Knight's Cross with Oak Leaves was awarded.

Legend:

This along with the + (plus) indicates that a higher grade of Knight's Cross was awarded as well.
This along with the * (asterisk) indicates that the Knight's Cross with Oak Leaves was awarded posthumously.
This along with the ? (question mark) indicates that author Veit Scherzer has expressed doubt regarding the veracity or formal correctness of the listing, and may be applicable to the Knight's Cross with Oak Leaves and/or one of its higher grades.

Number	Name	Service	Rank	Role and unit (Note: For an explanation of the various naming schemes used by the Luftwaffe, Heer, Kriegsmarine, and Waffen-SS refer to nomenclature used by the Wehrmacht and Waffen-SS.)	Date of award	Notes	Image
361	Bernd Klug	Kriegsmarine	Korvettenkapitän	Chief of the 5. Schnellbootflottille	1 January 1944	—	
362	Klaus Feldt	Kriegsmarine	Korvettenkapitän	Chief of the 2. Schnellbootflottille	1 January 1944	—	—
363	Walter Krauß	Luftwaffe	Hauptmann	Gruppenkommandeur of the III./Sturzkampfgeschwader 2 "Immelmann"	3 January 1944*	Killed in action 17 July 1943	—
364	Horst Hannig	Luftwaffe	Leutnant	Staffelführer of the 2./Jagdgeschwader 2 "Richthofen"	3 January 1944*	Killed in action 15 May 1943	—
365	Hans-Arnold Stahlschmidt	Luftwaffe	Leutnant	Staffelführer of the 2./Jagdgeschwader 27	3 January 1944*	Missing in action 7 September 1942	—
366	Helmut Kalbitz	Heer	Hauptmann	Commander of Pionier-Bataillon 31	7 January 1944	—	—
367	Dr. jur. Josef-Georg Mulzer (Note: In German a Doctor of Law is abbreviated as Dr. iur. (Doctor iuris) or Dr. jur. (Doctor juris))	Heer	Major	Commander of Pionier-Bataillon 195	10 January 1944	—	—
368	Maximilian Fretter-Pico	Heer	General der Artillerie	Commanding general of the XXX. Armeekorps	16 January 1944	—	—
369	Dipl.-Ing. Hans Schlemmer (Note: In German an engineer's degree is called Diplom-Ingenieur (abbreviated Dipl.-Ing.))	Heer	Generalleutnant	Commander of 134. Infanterie-Division	18 January 1944	—	
370	Heinrich Boigk	Heer	Feldwebel	Zugführer (platoon leader) of the 2./Jäger-Regiment 49	18 January 1944	—	—
371	August Schmidt	Heer	Generalleutnant	Commander of 10. Panzergrenadier-Division	23 January 1944	—	A man wearing a military uniform with an Iron Cross displayed at the front of his uniform collar.
372	Friedrich Wiese	Heer	General der Infanterie	Commanding general of the XXXV. Armeekorps	24 January 1944	—	—
373	Walter Krüger	Heer	Generalleutnant	Commander of the 1. Panzer-Division	24 January 1944	—	—
374	Karl Koetz	Heer	Oberstleutnant	Commander of Grenadier-Regiment 185	24 January 1944	—	—
375	Hugo Kraas	Waffen-SS	SS-Obersturmbannführer	Commander of SS-Panzergrenadier-Regiment 2 "Leibstandarte SS Adolf Hitler"	24 January 1944	—	—
376	Eduard Hauser	Heer	Generalmajor	Commander of the 13. Panzer-Division	26 January 1944	—	—
377	Joachim Peiper+	Waffen-SS	SS-Obersturmbannführer	Commander of SS-Panzer-Regiment 1 "Leibstandarte SS Adolf Hitler"	27 January 1944	Awarded 119th Swords 11 January 1945	A man wearing a military uniform, peaked cap, and a neck order in the shape of a cross. His cap has an emblem in shape of a human skull and crossed bones.
378	Walter Fries+	Heer	Generalleutnant	Commander of the 29. Panzergrenadier-Division	29 January 1944	Awarded 87th Swords 11 August 1944	—
379	Walther Sievers	Heer	Oberstleutnant of the Reserves	Commander of Grenadier-Regiment 415	29 January 1944	—	—
380	Michael Wittmann+	Waffen-SS	SS-Untersturmführer (Note: According to Scherzer as SS-Untersturmführer of the Reserves and Zugführer (platoon leader) in the 13.(schwere)/SS-Panzer-Regiment 1.)	Zugführer (platoon leader) of the 13.(schwere)/SS-Panzer-Regiment 1 "Leibstandarte SS Adolf Hitler"	30 January 1944	Awarded 71st Swords 22 June 1944	A man wearing a black military uniform, peaked cap, and a neck order in the shape of a cross. His cap has an emblem in shape of a human skull and crossed bones.
381	Bernhard Flachs	Heer	Hauptmann	Commander of Sturmgeschütz-Abteilung 277	31 January 1944	—	—
382	Richard Heidrich+	Luftwaffe	Generalleutnant	Commander of the 1. Fallschirmjäger-Division	5 February 1944	Awarded 55th Swords 25 March 1944	A man wearing a military uniform with an Iron Cross displayed at the front of his uniform collar.
383	Walther Nehring+	Heer	General der Panzertruppe	Commanding general of the XXIV. Panzerkorps	8 February 1944	Awarded 124th Swords 22 January 1945	Nehring is seen in profile.
384	Botho Kollberg	Heer	Oberst	Commander of Grenadier-Regiment 23	8 February 1944*	Killed in action 24 January 1944	—
385	Erich Löwe	Heer	Major	Commander of schwere Panzer-Abteilung 501	8 February 1944*	Killed in action 24 December 1943	A man wearing a military uniform with an Iron Cross displayed at the front of his uniform collar.
386	Günther Hilt	Heer	Hauptmann of the Reserves (Note: According to Scherzer as Hauptmann and not as Hauptmann of the Reserves.)	Commander of the III./Jäger-Regiment 56	8 February 1944	—	—
387	Fritz Breithaupt	Kriegsmarine	Korvettenkapitän of the Reserves	Chief of the 24. Minensuchflottille	10 February 1944	—	—
388	Robert Martinek	Heer	General der Artillerie	Commanding general of the XXXIX. Panzerkorps	10 February 1944	—	—
389	Josef Schneider	Heer	Leutnant of the Reserves (Note: According to Scherzer as Leutnant and not as Leutnant of the Reserves.)	Leader of the 13./Jäger-Regiment 207	10 February 1944	—	—
390	Walter Möse	Heer	Feldwebel	Zugführer (platoon leader) in the 13./Jäger-Regiment 49	10 February 1944	—	—
391	Friedrich Kirchner+	Heer	General der Panzertruppe	Commanding general of the LVII. Panzerkorps	12 February 1944	Awarded 127th Swords 26 January 1945	A man wearing a military uniform with an Iron Cross displayed at the front of his uniform collar.
392	Hans Källner+	Heer	Generalmajor	Commander of the 19. Panzer-Division	12 February 1944	Awarded 106th Swords 23 October 1944	—
393	Theodor Wisch+	Waffen-SS	SS-Brigadeführer and Generalmajor of the Waffen-SS	Commander of the 1. SS-Panzer-Division "Leibstandarte SS Adolf Hitler"	12 February 1944	Awarded 94th Swords 30 August 1944	—
394	Heinrich-Walter Bronsart von Schellendorff	Heer	Oberst	Commander of Panzergrenadier-Regiment 13	12 February 1944	—	—
395	Karl Lorenz	Heer	Oberst	Commander of Grenadier-Regiment "Großdeutschland"	12 February 1944	—	—
396	Meinrad von Lauchert	Heer	Oberst	Commander of Panzer-Regiment 15	12 February 1944	—	—
397	Josef Karl	Heer	Unteroffizier	Gun commander in the 2./Panzer-Jagd-Abteilung 49	16 February 1944	—	A man wearing a military uniform with an Iron Cross displayed at the front of his uniform collar.
398	Ferdinand Schörner+	Heer	General der Gebirgstruppe	Commanding general of the XXXX. Panzerkorps	17 February 1944	Awarded 93rd Swords 28 August 1944; 23rd Diamonds 1 January 1945	A man wearing a military uniform with an Iron Cross displayed at the front of his uniform collar.
399	Wilhelm Stemmermann	Heer	General der Artillerie	Commanding general of the XI. Armeekorps	18 February 1944*	Killed in action 18 February 1944	—
400	Theo-Helmut Lieb	Heer	Generalleutnant	Commanding general of the XXXXII. Armeekorps	18 February 1944	—	—
401	Robert Kaestner	Heer	Major	Leader of Grenadier-Regiment 105	21 February 1944	—	—
402	Ernst-Günther Baade+	Heer	Oberst	Leader of the 90. Panzer-Grenadier-Division	22 February 1944	Awarded 111th Swords 16 November 1944	A man wearing a military uniform, peaked cap with an Iron Cross displayed at the front of his uniform collar.
403	Dr. med. dent. Rudolf Kolbeck (Note: In German a Doctor of Medical Dentistry is abbreviated as Dr. med. dent. (Doctor medicinae dentariae).)	Heer	Oberstleutnant of the Reserves	Commander of Grenadier-Regiment 316	22 February 1944	—	—
404	Maximilian Wengler+	Heer	Oberst of the Reserves	Commander of Grenadier-Regiment 366 (Note: According to Scherzer as commander of Infanterie-Regiment 366.)	22 February 1944	Awarded 123rd Swords 21 January 1945	A man wearing a military uniform with an Iron Cross displayed at the front of his uniform collar.
405	Walter Mix	Heer	Hauptmann of the Reserves	Commander of the II./Grenadier-Regiment 174	22 February 1944	—	—
406	Otto Benzin	Heer	Major	Leader of Grenadier-Regiment 89	22 February 1944	—	—
407	Werner Forst	Heer	Generalleutnant	Commander of the 106. Infanterie-Division	22 February 1944	—	—
408	Helmuth Weidling+	Heer	General der Artillerie	Commanding general of the XXXXI. Panzerkorps	22 February 1944	Awarded 115th Swords 28 November 1944	A man wearing a military uniform with an Iron Cross displayed at the front of his uniform collar.
409	Friedrich Mieth	Heer	General der Infanterie	Commanding general of the IV. Armeekorps	1 March 1944	—	—
410	Dr. rer. pol. Hermann Hohn+ (Note: In German a Doctorate of Economics is abbreviated as Dr. rer. pol. (Doctor rerum politicarum).)	Heer	Oberst	Leader of the 72. Infanterie-Division	1 March 1944	Awarded 109th Swords 31 October 1944	—
411	Erich Walther+	Luftwaffe	Oberst	Commander of Fallschirmjäger-Regiment 4	2 March 1944	Awarded 131st Swords 1 February 1945	
412	Ludwig Heilmann+	Luftwaffe	Oberst	Commander of Fallschirmjäger-Regiment 3 (Note: According to Scherzer as commander of the III./Fallschirmjäger-Regiment 3.)	2 March 1944	Awarded 67th Swords 15 May 1944	A man wearing a military uniform with an Iron Cross displayed at the front of his uniform collar.
413	Kurt Bühligen+	Luftwaffe	Major	Gruppenkommandeur of the II./Jagdgeschwader 2 "Richthofen"	2 March 1944	Awarded 88th Swords 14 August 1944	A man wearing a military uniform with an Iron Cross displayed at the front of his uniform collar.
414	Horst Ademeit	Luftwaffe	Hauptmann	Gruppenkommandeur of the I./Jagdgeschwader 54	2 March 1944	—	—
415	Walter Krupinski	Luftwaffe	Oberleutnant	Staffelkapitän of the 7./Jagdgeschwader 52	2 March 1944	—	
416	August Geiger	Luftwaffe	Hauptmann	Gruppenkommandeur of the III./Nachtjagdgeschwader 1	2 March 1944*	Killed in action 29 September 1943	—
417	Hans-Dieter Frank	Luftwaffe	Hauptmann	Gruppenkommandeur of the I./Nachtjagdgeschwader 1	2 March 1944*	Killed in action 27 September 1943	—
418	Johannes Wiese	Luftwaffe	Major	Gruppenkommandeur of the I./Jagdgeschwader 52	2 March 1944	—	—
419	Reinhard Seiler	Luftwaffe	Major	Gruppenkommandeur of the I./Jagdgeschwader 54	2 March 1944	—	—
420	Erich Hartmann+	Luftwaffe	Leutnant	Staffelführer of the 9./Jagdgeschwader 52 (Note: According to Scherzer as Staffelkapitän of the 9./Jagdgeschwader 52.)	2 March 1944	Awarded 75th Swords 2 July 1944; 18th Diamonds 25 August 1944	
421	Hermann-Heinrich Behrend+	Heer	Oberst	Commander of Grenadier-Regiment 154	6 March 1944	Awarded (148th) Swords 26 April 1945	—
422	Gustav Stühmer	Heer	Oberfeldwebel	Zugführer (platoon leader) in the 11./Grenadier-Regiment 399	6 March 1944*	Killed in action 16 February 1944	—
423	Fritz von Scholz Edler von Rarancze+	Waffen-SS	SS-Brigadeführer and Generalmajor of the Waffen-SS	Commander of the 11. SS-Freiwilligen-Panzergrenadier-Division "Nordland"	12 March 1944	Awarded 85th Swords 8 August 1944	—
424	Willi Thulke	Heer	Hauptmann	Commander of the I./Grenadier-Regiment 501	13 March 1944	—	—
425	Josef Rettemeier	Heer	Hauptmann	Commander of Panzer-Abteilung 5	13 March 1944	—	A man wearing a military uniform with an Iron Cross displayed at the front of his uniform collar.
426	Smilo Freiherr von Lüttwitz+	Heer	Generalleutnant	Commander of the 26. Panzer-Division	16 March 1944	Awarded 76th Swords 4 July 1944	A man wearing a military uniform sitting at a desk.
427	Josef Bregenzer	Heer	Oberstleutnant	Commander of Grenadier-Regiment 245	17 March 1944	—	—
428	Friedrich Schulz+	Heer	Generalleutnant	Acting commander of the III. Panzerkorps	20 March 1944	Awarded 135th Swords 26 February 1945	—
429	Werner Mummert+	Heer	Oberstleutnant of the Reserves	Commander of Panzergrenadier-Regiment 103	20 March 1944	Awarded 107th Swords 23 October 1944	A man wearing a military uniform with an Iron Cross displayed at the front of his uniform collar.
430	Hans-Joachim Jabs	Luftwaffe	Hauptmann	Gruppenkommandeur of the IV./Nachtjagdgeschwader 1	24 March 1944	—	A man wearing a military uniform with an Iron Cross displayed at the front of his uniform collar.
431	Bernhard Jope	Luftwaffe	Major	Geschwaderkommodore of Kampfgeschwader 100	24 March 1944	—	A man wearing a military uniform with an Iron Cross displayed at the front of his uniform collar.
432	Wilhelm Schmitter	Luftwaffe	Major	Staffelkapitän of the 15./Kampfgeschwader 2	24 March 1944*	Missing in action 8 November 1943	—
433	Dr. jur. Maximilian Otte	Luftwaffe	Major	Gruppenkommandeur of the II./Schlachtgeschwader 2 "Immelmann"	24 March 1944	—	—
434	Hansgeorg Bätcher	Luftwaffe	Major	Gruppenkommandeur of the I./Kampfgeschwader 4 "General Wever"	24 March 1944	—	—
435	Georg Koßmala	Heer	Oberst	Commander of Grenadier-Regiment 6	26 March 1944	—	—
436	Georg Grüner	Heer	Hauptmann	Commander of the I./Panzer-Regiment 2	26 March 1944*	Killed in action 11 March 1944	A young man wearing a peaked cap and black military uniform with an Iron Cross displayed at the front of his uniform collar.
437	Eduard Tratt	Luftwaffe	Hauptmann	Gruppenkommandeur of the II./Zerstörergeschwader 26	26 March 1944*	Killed in action 22 February 1944	—
438	Fritz Petersen	Luftwaffe	Wachtmeister (Note: According to Scherzer as Oberwachtmeister and not Wachtmeister.)	Gun commander in the 6./Flak-Regiment 4	26 March 1944	—	—
439	Fridolin von Senger und Etterlin	Heer	General der Panzertruppe	Commanding general of the XIV. Panzerkorps	5 April 1944	—	A man wearing a military uniform with an Iron Cross displayed at the front of his uniform collar.
440	Ludwig Müller	Heer	Generalleutnant	Deputy leader of the XXIX. Armeekorps	6 April 1944	—	—
441	Heinz Wittchow von Brese-Winiary	Heer	Major	Leader of Panzergrenadier-Regiment 108	6 April 1944	—	—
442	Herbert Schwender	Heer	Oberst	Commander of Grenadier-Regiment 45	6 April 1944	—	—
443	Hans Kroh+	Luftwaffe	Oberstleutnant	Commander of Fallschirmjäger-Regiment 2	6 April 1944	Awarded 96th Swords 12 September 1944	A man wearing a military uniform with an Iron Cross displayed at the front of his uniform collar.
444	Günther Radusch	Luftwaffe	Oberstleutnant (Note: According to Scherzer as Major and not Oberstleutnant.)	Geschwaderkommodore of Nachtjagdgeschwader 5	6 April 1944	—	—
445	Johannes Frießner	Heer	General der Infanterie	Army Detachment Narva	9 April 1944	—	A man wearing a military uniform with an Iron Cross displayed at the front of his uniform collar.
446	Alfred Grislawski	Luftwaffe	Hauptmann	Staffelkapitän of the 1./Jagdgeschwader 1	11 April 1944	—	—
447	Erich Rudorffer+	Luftwaffe	Major (Note: According to Scherzer as Hauptmann and not as Major.)	Gruppenkommandeur of the II./Jagdgeschwader 54	11 April 1944	Awarded 126th Swords 26 January 1945	A man wearing a military uniform with a peaked cap on his head.
448	Emil Lang	Luftwaffe	Oberleutnant	Staffelkapitän of the 9./Jagdgeschwader 54	11 April 1944	—	—
449	Otto Kittel+	Luftwaffe	Leutnant	Pilot in the 1./Jagdgeschwader 54	11 April 1944	Awarded 113th Swords 25 November 1944	—
450	Rudolf Schoenert	Luftwaffe	Major of the Reserves	Commander of Nachtjagdgruppe 10	11 April 1944	—	—
451	Wilhelm Herget	Luftwaffe	Major (Note: According to Scherzer as Major of the Reserves.)	Gruppenkommandeur of the I./Nachtjagdgeschwader 4	11 April 1944	—	—
452	Anton Hafner	Luftwaffe	Leutnant	Pilot in the 6./Jagdgeschwader 51 "Mölders"	11 April 1944	—	—
453	Dr. rer. pol. Dr.-Ing. Johannes Mayer+ (Note: In German a Doctorate of Economics is abbreviated as Dr. rer. pol. (Doctor rerum politicarum) and a Doctorate in engineering is abbreviated as Dr.-Ing. (Doctor-Ingenieur).)	Heer	Generalleutnant	Commander of the 329. Infanterie-Division	13 April 1944	Awarded 89th Swords 23 August 1944	—
454	Heinrich Hogrebe	Heer	Hauptmann	Commander of the II./Grenadier-Regiment 422	13 April 1944	—	—
455	Rudolf Geisler	Heer	Major	Commander of Pionier-Bataillon 662	13 April 1944*	Died of wounds 13 April 1944	—
456	Heinrich von Vietinghoff called Scheel	Heer	Generaloberst	Commander-in-chief of the 10. Armee	16 April 1944	—	A man wearing a military uniform with an Iron Cross displayed at the front of his uniform collar.
457	Egon von Neindorff	Heer	Generalmajor	Combat commander of Tarnopol	17 April 1944*	Killed in action 15 April 1944	—
458	Wilhelm Drewes	Heer	Major	Commander of the I./Panzergrenadier-Regiment 13	20 April 1944	—	—
459	Karl-Lothar Schulz+	Luftwaffe	Oberst	Commander of Fallschirmjäger-Regiment 1	20 April 1944	Awarded 112th Swords 18 November 1944	A man wearing a military uniform with an Iron Cross displayed at the front of his uniform collar.
460	Günther Schack	Luftwaffe	Leutnant	Staffelkapitän of the 9./Jagdgeschwader 51 "Mölders"	20 April 1944	—	—
461	Otto Pollmann	Kriegsmarine	Oberleutnant zur See of the Reserves	Commander of U-Jäger 2210	25 April 1944	—	—
462	Hans-Karl Stepp	Luftwaffe	Oberstleutnant	Geschwaderkommodore of Schlachtgeschwader 2 "Immelmann"	27 April 1944 (Note: According to Scherzer on 25 April 1944.)	—	—
463	Martin Möbus	Luftwaffe	Major	Gruppenkommandeur of the I./Schlachtgeschwader 5	27 April 1944 (Note: According to Scherzer on 25 April 1944.)	—	
464	Albin Wolf	Luftwaffe	Leutnant	Pilot in the 6./Jagdgeschwader 54	27 April 1944* (Note: According to Scherzer on 25 April 1944.)	Killed in action 2 April 1944	—
465	Heinz Vinke	Luftwaffe	Oberfeldwebel	Pilot in the 11./Nachtjagdgeschwader 1	27 April 1944*	Missing in action 26 February 1944	Smiling man wearing life jacket and a military decoration in shape of an Iron Cross at his neck.
466	Karl Decker+	Heer	Generalmajor	Commander of the 5. Panzer-Division	4 May 1944	Awarded (149th) Swords 26 April 1945? (Note: The German Federal Archives hold no records for the presentation of the Swords. The Association of Knight's Cross Recipients (AKCR) assumes that the presentation fell into the timeframe 20 April 1945 to 29 April 1945. It is assumed that the nomination was approved on 26 April 1945. Scherzer states that the assumption is based on a statement from Decker's widow. She claimed that she had been informed that her husband had received the award. The date and sequential number "149" were assigned by the AKCR.)	—
467	Erich Lorenz	Heer	Oberstleutnant of the Reserves	Leader of Grenadier-Regiment 287	4 May 1944	—	—
468	Wilhelm Eggemann	Heer	Oberstleutnant	Commander of Grenadier-Regiment 209	4 May 1944	—	—
469	Theodor von Lücken	Heer	Hauptmann	Commander of the I./Grenadier-Regiment 686	7 May 1944	—	—
470	Otto Deßloch	Luftwaffe	Generaloberst	Commander-in-chief of the Luftflotte 4	10 May 1944	—	
471	Leopold Münster	Luftwaffe	Leutnant	Staffelkapitän in the 4./Jagdgeschwader 3 "Udet" (Note: According to Scherzer as Staffelkapitän of the 5./Jagdgeschwader 3 "Udet".)	12 May 1944*	Killed in action 8 May 1944	
472	Max Sachsenheimer+	Heer	Major	Leader of Jäger-Regiment 75	14 May 1944	Awarded 132nd Swords 6 February 1945	—
473	Martin Hrustak	Heer	Oberfeldwebel	Zugführer (platoon leader) of the 7./Grenadier-Regiment 162	14 May 1944	—	—
474	Johann Schwerdfeger	Heer	Oberfeldwebel	Zugführer (platoon leader) of the 1./Jäger-Regiment 228	14 May 1944	—	—
475	Emil Vogel	Heer	Generalleutnant	Commander of the 101. Jäger-Division	14 May 1944	—	—
476	Rudolf Freiherr von Waldenfels	Heer	Generalmajor	Commander of the 6. Panzer-Division	14 May 1944	—	—
477	Fritz Müller	Heer	Oberst	Commander of Grenadier-Regiment 208	14 May 1944	—	—
478	Kilian Weimer	Heer	Major (Note: According to Scherzer as Oberstleutnant.)	Commander of Luftwaffen-Jäger-Regiment 25	14 May 1944	—	—
479	Walter Schmidt	Waffen-SS	SS-Hauptsturmführer	Commander of the II./SS-Panzergrenadier-Regiment "Westland"	14 May 1944	—	—
480	Karl Ullrich	Waffen-SS	SS-Obersturmbannführer	Commander of SS-Panzergrenadier-Regiment 6 "Theodor Eicke"	14 May 1944	—	—
481	Karl Henze	Luftwaffe	Major	Gruppenkommandeur of the I./Schlachtgeschwader 77	20 May 1944	—	
482	Willy Marienfeld	Heer	Major of the Reserves (Note: According to Scherzer as Major and not as Major of the Reserves.)	Commander of Infanterie-Regiment 123	25 May 1944	—	—
483	Ferdinand Wegerer	Heer	Feldwebel	Zugführer (platoon leader) in the 1./Panzergrenadier-Regiment 10	4 June 1944	—	—
484	Wolf Hagemann	Heer	Generalmajor	Commander of the 336. Infanterie-Division	4 June 1944	—	—
485	Hans Strippel	Heer	Oberfeldwebel	Zugführer (platoon leader) in the 4./Panzer-Regiment 1	4 June 1944	—	—
486	Friedrich Hochbaum	Heer	Generalleutnant	Commander of the 34. Infanterie-Division	4 June 1944	—	—
487	Ernst-Eberhard Hell	Heer	General der Artillerie	Commanding general of the VII. Armeekorps	4 June 1944	—	
488	Alfons Hitter	Heer	Generalleutnant	Commander of the 206. Infanterie-Division	4 June 1944	—	—
489	Wolfgang Pickert	Luftwaffe	Generalleutnant	Commanding general of the III. Flak-Korps (Note: According to Scherzer as commander of the 9. Flak-Division.)	5 June 1944	—	—
490	Gottfried Weber	Luftwaffe	Generalmajor	Commander of the 12. Luftwaffen-Feld-Division	9 June 1944	—	—
491	Horst Niederländer	Heer	Oberstleutnant	Commander of Divisions-Füsilier-Bataillon 336	9 June 1944*	Died of wounds 24 April 1944	—
492	Georg Bonk	Heer	Feldwebel	Zugführer (platoon leader) in the 6./Grenadier-Regiment 365	9 June 1944	—	—
493	Hubert Pilarski	Heer	Oberfeldwebel	Zugführer (platoon leader) in the 8./Grenadier-Regiment 948	9 June 1944	—	—
494	Ernst-Wilhelm Hoffmann	Heer	Oberstleutnant	Commander of Panzergrenadier-Regiment 12	9 June 1944	—	—
495	Konrad Zeller	Heer	Hauptmann of the Reserves	Commander of the III./Grenadier-Regiment 380	9 June 1944	—	—
496	Joachim Domaschk	Heer	Major	Commander of the I./Panzergrenadier-Regiment 103	11 June 1944	—	—
497	Emil Kaminsky	Heer	Oberfeldwebel	Orderly officer of the I./Grenadier-Regiment 446	12 June 1944	—	—
498	Edwin Stolz	Heer	Leutnant of the Reserves	Leader of 14./Grenadier-Regiment 353	12 June 1944*	Died of wounds 17 May 1944	—
499	Rudolf Petersen	Kriegsmarine	Kapitän zur See	Leader of the Schnellboote	13 June 1944	—	—
500	Götz Freiherr von Mirbach	Kriegsmarine	Kapitänleutnant	Chief of the 9. Schnellbootflottille	14 June 1944	—	—
501	Diddo Diddens	Heer	Oberleutnant of the Reserves	Chief of the 1./Sturmgeschütz-Brigade "Großdeutschland"	15 June 1944	—	—
502	Ernst Sieler	Heer	Generalleutnant	Commander of the 304. Infanterie-Division	24 June 1944	—	—
503	Erich Marcks	Heer	General der Artillerie	Commanding general of the LXXXIV. Armeekorps	24 June 1944*	Killed in action 12 June 1944	
504	Albert Brux	Heer	Oberst	Commander of Panzergrenadier-Regiment 40	24 June 1944	—	—
505	Horst Kaubisch	Luftwaffe	Major	Gruppenkommandeur of the I./Schlachtgeschwader 1	24 June 1944	—	—
506	Hendrik Stahl	Luftwaffe	Oberleutnant	Staffelkapitän of the 8./Schlachtgeschwader 2 "Immelmann"	24 June 1944	—	—
507	Heinz-Wolfgang Schnaufer+	Luftwaffe	Hauptmann	Gruppenkommandeur of the IV./Nachtjagdgeschwader 1	24 June 1944	Awarded 84th Swords 30 July 1944; 21st Diamonds 16 October 1944 (Note: According to Scherzer the Swords to the Knight's Cross of the Iron Cross with Oak Leaves were awarded on 3 August 1944.)	
508	Adolf Glunz	Luftwaffe	Leutnant	Pilot in the 6./Jagdgeschwader 26 "Schlageter"	24 June 1944	—	
509	Eduard Skrzipek	Luftwaffe	Hauptmann	Staffelkapitän of the 14.(Eis.)/Kampfgeschwader 27 "Boelcke"	24 June 1944	—	—
510	Reinhard Egger	Luftwaffe	Oberstleutnant	Leader of Fallschirmjäger-Regiment 4	24 June 1944	—	A man wearing a military uniform with an Iron Cross displayed at the front of his uniform collar.
511	Josef-August Fitz	Heer	Major	Commander of the I./Fallschirm-Panzergrenadier-Regiment 1 "Hermann Göring"	24 June 1944	—	—
512	Herbert Huppertz	Luftwaffe	Hauptmann	Gruppenkommandeur of the III./Jagdgeschwader 2 "Richthofen"	24 June 1944*	Killed in action 8 June 1944	
513	Clemens-Heinrich Graf von Kageneck	Heer	Hauptmann	Commander of schwere Panzer-Abteilung 503	26 June 1944	—	—
514	Werner Kolb	Heer	Oberst of the Reserves	Commander of Grenadier-Regiment 36	26 June 1944	—	—
515	Martin Unrein	Heer	Generalmajor	Commander of the 14. Panzer-Division	26 June 1944	—	—
516	Erich Abraham	Heer	Generalleutnant	Commander of the 76. Infanterie-Division	26 June 1944	—	—
517	Fritz-Hubert Gräser+	Heer	Generalleutnant	Commander of the 3. Panzergrenadier-Division	26 June 1944	Awarded (154th) Swords 8 May 1945? (Note: Fritz-Hubert Gräser's nomination was received by the Heerespersonalamt (HPA—Army Personnel Office) on 29 April 1945. General Ernst Maisel noted: "I approve the nomination! 30 April". The nomination list for the higher grades of the Knight's Cross of the Iron Cross only notes the nomination entry date as 29 April 1945. There is no indication that the award was granted. The paperwork was not finalized by the end of the war. The Association of Knight's Cross Recipients (AKCR) claims that the award was presented in accordance with the Dönitz-decree. This is illegal according to the Deutsche Dienststelle (WASt) and lacks legal justification. The sequential number "154" and presentation date were assigned by the AKCR.)	—
518	Friedrich Dollmann	Heer	Generaloberst	Commander-in-chief of the 7. Armee	1 July 1944*	Committed suicide 29 June 1944	A man wearing a military uniform and peaked cap.
519	Gerd von Rundstedt+	Heer	Generalfeldmarschall	Oberbefehlshaber West	1 July 1944	Awarded 133rd Swords 18 February 1945	A man wearing a military uniform and peaked cap holding a baton.
520	Hermann Wulf	Heer	Major	Commander of the III./Grenadier-Regiment 76 (motorized)	3 July 1944	—	—
521	Erich Buschenhagen	Heer	General der Infanterie	Commanding general of the LII. Armeekorps	4 July 1944	—	
522	Heinz-Otto Fabian	Heer	Hauptmann	Commander of the II./Grenadier-Regiment 361 (motorized)	9 July 1944	—	—
523	Karl Palmgreen	Kriegsmarine	Korvettenkapitän z.V. (z.V.—zur Verfügung; for disposition)	Chief of the 38. Minensuchflottille	11 July 1944	—	—
524	Heinrich Hoffmann	Kriegsmarine	Korvettenkapitän	Chief of the 5. Torpedobootflottille	11 July 1944	—	—
525	Heinz-Georg Lemm+	Heer	Major	Commander of the I./Füsilier-Regiment 27	11 July 1944	Awarded 137th Swords 15 March 1945	
526	Wilhelm Batz+	Luftwaffe	Hauptmann	Gruppenkommandeur of the III./Jagdgeschwader 52 (Note: According to Scherzer as leader of the III./Jagdgeschwader 52.)	20 July 1944	Awarded (145th) Swords 21 April 1945	—
527	Willy Kientsch	Luftwaffe	Oberleutnant	Staffelkapitän of the 6./Jagdgeschwader 27	20 July 1944*	Killed in action 29 January 1944	—
528	Heinz Strüning	Luftwaffe	Hauptmann of the Reserves (Note: According to Scherzer as Hauptmann (war officer).)	Staffelkapitän of the 3./Nachtjagdgeschwader 1	20 July 1944	—	A pilot seated in his fighter craft gestures with a gloved hand.
529	Karl-Heinz Weber	Luftwaffe	Hauptmann	Staffelkapitän of the 7./Jagdgeschwader 51 "Mölders"	20 July 1944*	Missing in action 7 June 1944	—
530	Otto Weßling	Luftwaffe	Oberleutnant	Staffelkapitän of the 11./Jagdgeschwader 3 "Udet"	20 July 1944*	Killed in action 19 April 1944	—
531	Rudolf Frank	Luftwaffe	Oberfeldwebel	Pilot in the 2./Nachtjagdgeschwader 3	20 July 1944*	Killed in action 26 April 1944	—
532	Herbert Lamprecht	Luftwaffe	Hauptmann (Note: According to Scherzer as Major.)	Commander of the leichte Flak-Abteilung 76	25 July 1944	—	—
533	Wilhelm von Salisch	Heer	Major	Leader of Jäger-Regiment 49	27 July 1944	—	—
534	Gerhard Kruse	Heer	Hauptmann of the Reserves	Leader of the II./Grenadier-Regiment 48	27 July 1944	—	—
535	Otto Carius	Heer	Leutnant of the Reserves	Leader of the 2./schwere Panzer-Abteilung 502	27 July 1944	—	A man wearing a military uniform with an Iron Cross displayed at the front of his uniform collar.
536	Hermann von Oppeln-Bronikowski+	Heer	Oberst	Commander of Panzer-Regiment 22	28 July 1944	Awarded 142nd Swords 17 April 1945	A man wearing a military uniform with an Iron Cross displayed at the front of his uniform collar.
537	Rudolf Demme	Heer	Oberst	Commander of Panzergrenadier-Regiment 59	28 July 1944	—	—
538	Paul Schulze	Heer	Major	Commander of Panzer-Abteilung 21	28 July 1944	—	—
539	Kurt von Tippelskirch	Heer	General der Infanterie	Deputy commander-in-chief of the 4. Armee	30 July 1944	—	—
540	Hubert Mickley	Heer	Hauptmann	Commander of the I./Grenadier-Regiment 4	4 August 1944	—	—
541	Willy Wesche	Heer	Oberst	Commander of Grenadier-Regiment 427	6 August 1944*	Killed in action 27 June 1944	—
542	Carl Hilpert	Heer	General der Infanterie	Commanding general of the I. Armeekorps	8 August 1944	—	
543	Heinrich Nickel	Heer	Generalmajor	Commander of the 342. Infanterie-Division	8 August 1944	—	—
544	Curt Schille	Heer	Major	Commander of Pionier-Bataillon 24	8 August 1944	—	—
545	Martin Strahammer	Heer	Oberst	Commander of Grenadier-Regiment 146	11 August 1944	—	—
546	Karl Kloskowski	Waffen-SS	SS-Obersturmführer	Leader of the 7./SS-Panzer-Regiment 2 "Das Reich"	11 August 1944	—	A black-and-white photograph of a man wearing a camouflage military uniform, side cap, and a pair of binoculars around his neck. His cap has an emblem in shape of a human skull and crossed bones.
547	Gerhard Simons	Heer	Oberleutnant of the Reserves	Leader of Stabs-Batterie/Artillerie-Regiment 240 and Regiments-Nachrichtenoffizier	11 August 1944	—	—
548	Max Wünsche	Waffen-SS	SS-Obersturmbannführer	Commander of SS-Panzer-Regiment 12 "Hitlerjugend"	11 August 1944	—	A man wearing a military uniform with an Iron Cross displayed at the front of his uniform collar.
549	Dietrich Kraiß	Heer	Generalleutnant	Commander of the 352. Infanterie-Division	11 August 1944*	Killed in action 2 August 1944	A man wearing a military uniform with an Iron Cross displayed at the front of his uniform collar.
550	Rudolf Bacherer	Heer	Oberst of the Reserves	Commander of Grenadier-Regiment 1049	11 August 1944	—	—
551	Andreas von Aulock	Heer	Oberst	Commander of the fortress "Saint-Malo"	16 August 1944	—	—
552	Hermann Siggel	Heer	Oberstleutnant	Commander of Grenadier-Regiment 172	16 August 1944	—	—
553	Gerhard Pick	Heer	Major	Commander of Grenadier-Regiment 577	19 August 1944	—	—
554	Heinz Macher	Waffen-SS	SS-Obersturmführer	Chief of the 16.(Pi)/SS-Panzergrenadier-Regiment 3 "Deutschland"	19 August 1944	—	—
555	Hinrich Warrelmann	Heer	Oberst	Commander of Grenadier-Regiment 502	19 August 1944	—	—
556	Rudolf Wulf	Heer	Oberst	Commander of Grenadier-Regiment 422	19 August 1944	—	—
557	Werner Schulze	Heer	Oberst of the Reserves	Commander of Grenadier-Regiment 551	23 August 1944	—	—
558	Walter Melzer	Heer	Generalleutnant	Commander of the 252. Infanterie-Division	23 August 1944	—	—
559	Bruno Hinz	Waffen-SS	SS-Obersturmführer	Chief of the 2./SS-Panzergrenadier-Regiment 38 "Götz von Berlichingen" and leader of a Kampfgruppe	23 August 1944	—	—
560	Hellmuth Mäder+	Heer	Oberst	Leader of the Lehr-Brigade Nord of the Heeresgruppe Nord and combat commander of Schaulen	27 August 1944	Awarded 143rd Swords 18 April 1945	—
561	Rudolf Holste	Heer	Oberst	Leader of the 4. Kavallerie-Brigade	27 August 1944	—	—
562	Kurt Pflugbeil	Luftwaffe	General der Flieger	Commander-in-chief of Luftflotte 1	27 August 1944	—	—
563	Wilhelm Bittrich+	Waffen-SS	SS-Obergruppenführer and General of the Waffen-SS	Commanding general of the II. SS-Panzerkorps	28 August 1944	Awarded (153rd) Swords 6 May 1945? (Note: No evidence of the presentation of the award to Wilhelm Bittrich can be found in the German Federal Archives. The award was unlawfully presented by SS-Oberstgruppenführer Sepp Dietrich. The date is taken from the announcement made by the 6. SS-Panzerarmee. The sequential number "153" was assigned by the Association of Knight's Cross Recipients (AKCR). Bittrich was member of the AKCR.)	A hatless man wearing a military uniform with a neck order in the shape of a cross.
564	Eugen Meindl+	Luftwaffe	General der Fallschirmtruppe	Commanding general of the II. Fallschirmkorps	31 August 1944	Awarded (155th) Swords 8 May 1945? (Note: Eugen Meindl's nomination was approved by each of his commanding officers. However the nomination contains no final remark on the proceedings. Oberst Nicolaus von Below, Hitler's Luftwaffe adjutant, had sent a teleprinter message to the commanding general of the Fallschirmarmee Generaloberst Kurt Student, requesting a statement for this nomination. The copy of the teleprinter message contains a note: resubmission "23 April 1945". It seems that the statement was never returned. The paperwork was not finalized by the end of the war. The Association of Knight's Cross Recipients (AKCR) claims that the award was presented in accordance with the Dönitz-decree. This is illegal according to the Deutsche Dienststelle (WASt) and lacks legal justification. The sequential number "155" was assigned by the AKCR. Fellgiebel assigned the presentation date. Meindl is mentioned on a list of the Oberbefehlshaber Nordwest for "Nominations and Bestowal of War Awards" from May 1945. This list, which was intended to be presented to Karl Dönitz, contained twelve names of pending nominations which had been submitted via the chain of command. Dönitz never signed this list and it is believed that he never saw it. The responsible personnel offices awarded or declined eight nominations from this list by the end of the war by, two remained unprocessed by the Heerespersonalamt (HPA—Army Personnel Office) and Luftwaffenpersonalamt (LPA—Luftwaffe Personnel Office) and two further were left ready for signing at the Oberkommando der Wehrmacht/Wehrmacht-Führungsstab (OKW/WFSt—Oberkommando der Wehrmacht/Wehrmacht-Führungsstab—leadership staff of the Army High Command).)	A man wearing a military uniform with an Iron Cross displayed at the front of his uniform collar.
565	Hermann Flörke	Heer	Generalleutnant	Commander of the 14. Infanterie-Division	2 September 1944	—	—
566	Martin Bieber	Heer	Oberst	Leader of Divisiongruppe 86	2 September 1944	—	—
567	Hermann Klein	Heer	Hauptmann of the Reserves	Regiment adjutant of Grenadier-Regiment 551	2 September 1944*	Killed in action 18 August 1944	—
568	Jakob Gansmeier	Heer	Major of the Reserves	Commander of Divisions-Füsilier-Bataillon 212	2 September 1944*	Killed in action 8 August 1944	—
569	Walter Misera	Heer	Major	Leader of Divisionsgruppe 95	2 September 1944	—	—
570	Friedrich-Wilhelm Bock	Waffen-SS	SS-Oberführer	Commander of the 9. SS-Panzer-Division "Hohenstaufen"	2 September 1944	—	—
571	Heinrich Freiherr von Lüttwitz+	Heer	Generalleutnant	Commander of the 2. Panzer-Division	3 September 1944	Awarded (157th) Swords 9 May 1945? (Note: Heinrich von Lüttwitz's nomination was received by the Heerespersonalamt (HPA—Army Personnel Office) on 28 April 1945. Major Joachim Domaschk decided on 30 April: "Heeresgruppe B, postpone!" General Von Lüttwiz together with the remaining forces of the Heeresgruppe B was either taken prisoner of war or missing in action in the Ruhr Pocket on 15 April. The nomination was thus not further processed in accordance with AHA 44 Ziff. 572. The nomination list for the higher grades of the Knight's Cross of the Iron Cross also contains a note from 28 April 1945: "postponed". A bestowal thus did not occur. The sequential number "157" and presentation date were assigned by the Association of Knight's Cross Recipients (AKCR).)	—
572	Heinz Greiner	Heer	Generalleutnant	Commander of the 362. Infanterie-Division	5 September 1944	—	—
573	Christian Sonntag	Heer	Oberstleutnant	Commander of Grenadier-Regiment 248	5 September 1944	—	—
574	Hellmuth Pfeifer	Heer	Generalleutnant	Commander of the 65. Infanterie-Division	5 September 1944	—	—
575	Dr.-Ing. Rudolf Flinzer (Note: In German a Doctorate in engineering is abbreviated as Dr.-Ing. (Doctor-Ingenieur).)	Heer	Oberst of the Reserves	Commander of Grenadier-Regiment 317	5 September 1944	—	—
576	Walter Neitzel	Heer	Major	Commander of the I./Grenadier-Regiment 409	5 September 1944*	Died of wounds 2 September 1944	—
577	Richard Seuss	Kriegsmarine	Oberleutnant (Marine Artillerie—Naval artillery) of the Reserves	Chief of the naval battery "Ile de Cécembre"/Marine-Artillery-Abteilung 608	2 September 1944	—	
578	Otto Lasch	Heer	Generalleutnant	Commander of the 349. Infanterie-Division	10 September 1944	—	—
579	Alois Weber	Heer	Oberst	Commander of Grenadier-Regiment 61	10 September 1944	—	—
580	Gerhard Lindemann	Heer	Generalmajor	Acting leader of the 361. Infanterie-Division	10 September 1944	—	—
581	Johannes Bölter	Heer	Leutnant	Leader of the 1./schwere Panzer-Abteilung 502	10 September 1944	—	—
582	Gustav Reimar	Heer	Hauptmann	Commander of Feldersatz-Bataillon 76	10 September 1944	—	—
583	Otto Kähler	Kriegsmarine	Konteradmiral	Sea commander Brittany and commander of the fortress Brest	15 September 1944	—	
584	Erich Pietzonka	Luftwaffe	Oberst	Commander of Fallschirmjäger-Regiment 7	16 September 1944	—	A man wearing a military uniform with an Iron Cross displayed at the front of his uniform collar.
585	Walter Gericke	Luftwaffe	Major	Commander of Fallschirmjäger-Regiment 11	17 September 1944	—	A man wearing a military uniform with an Iron Cross displayed at the front of his uniform collar.
586	Heinrich Trettner	Luftwaffe	Generalmajor	Commander of the 4. Fallschirmjäger-Division	17 September 1944	—	A man wearing a military uniform with an Iron Cross displayed at the front of his uniform collar.
587	Hans Thurner	Luftwaffe	Hauptmann	Gruppenkommandeur of the I./Kampfgeschwader 6	17 September 1944*	Killed in action 11 June 1944	—
588	Paul Zorner	Luftwaffe	Hauptmann	Gruppenkommandeur of the III./Nachtjagdgeschwader 5	17 September 1944	—	—
589	Hans von der Mosel	Heer	Generalmajor	Chief of staff of the fortress Brest (France)	18 September 1944	—	—
590	Rudolf Haen	Heer	Major	Commander of Panzer-Abteilung 103	21 September 1944	—	—
591	Helmut Scholz	Waffen-SS	SS-Obersturmführer	Leader of the II./SS-Freiwilligen Panzergrenadier-Regiment 49 "De Ruyter" (niederl. Nr. 2)	21 September 1944	—	—
592	Otto Schury	Heer	Oberst	Commander of Jäger-Regiment 229	21 September 1944	—	—
593	Werner Marcks	Heer	Generalmajor	Commander of the 1. Panzer-Division	21 September 1944	—	—
594	Ehrenfried-Oskar Boege	Heer	General der Infanterie	Commanding general of the XXXXIII. Armeekorps	21 September 1944	—	
595	Hellmuth Becker	Waffen-SS	SS-Oberführer	Commander of the 3. SS-Panzer-Division "Totenkopf"	21 September 1944	—	
596	Johannes Mühlenkamp	Waffen-SS	SS-Standartenführer	division leader of the 5. SS-Panzer-Division "Wiking"	21 September 1944	—	—
597	Friedrich-August Schack	Heer	Generalleutnant	Commander of the 272. Infanterie-Division	21 September 1944	—	A man wearing a military uniform with an Iron Cross displayed at the front of his uniform collar.
598	Ernst König	Heer	Oberst	Commander of Grenadier-Regiment 12	21 September 1944	—	—
599	Ernst Philipp	Heer	Major	Panzer officer of the Stab AOK 8 (8. Armee)	30 September 1944	—	—
600	Wolfgang Kretzschmar+	Heer	Oberstleutnant	Commander of Jäger-Regiment 24 (L)	30 September 1944	Awarded 121st Swords 12 January 1945	—
601	Otto Meyer	Waffen-SS	SS-Obersturmbannführer	Commander of SS-Panzer-Regiment 9 "Hohenstaufen" (Note: According to Scherzer as commander of SS-Panzer-Regiment 9.)	30 September 1944*	Killed in action 24 August 1944	A black-and-white photograph of a man wearing a military uniform, cap, and a neck order in shape of an Iron Cross. His cap has an emblem in shape of a human skull and crossed bones.
602	Hermann Scharnagel	Heer	Major	Commander of Pionier-Bataillon 173	30 September 1944*	Killed in action 8 April 1944	—
603	Konrad Sauer	Heer	Leutnant of the Reserves	Leader of the 1./Sturmgeschütz-Brigade 393	30 September 1944	—	—
604	Jörg Burg	Heer	Oberleutnant of the Reserves	Chief of the 7./Panzer-Regiment "Großdeutschland"	4 October 1944*	Died of wounds 21 August 1944	—
605	Gerhard Behnke	Heer	Major	Commander of Sturmgeschütz-Brigade 322	4 October 1944	—	—
606	Gerhard Kunert	Heer	Unteroffizier	Group leader in the 6./Panzergrenadier-Regiment 33	4 October 1944*	Killed in action 31 August 1944	—
607	Wilhelm Kohler	Heer	Hauptmann	Orderly officer and leader of a Kampfgruppe of the 9. Panzer-Division	4 October 1944	—	—
608	Heinz Reinefarth	Waffen-SS	SS-Gruppenführer and Generalleutnant of the Police	Commander of a Kampfgruppe in the Korpsgruppe von dem Bach	30 September 1944	—	A black-and-white photograph of a man in semi profile wearing a military uniform and neck order, in shape of an Iron Cross. His dark hair is combed to the back. He has determined facial expression and a large scar on his cheek.
609	Erich Straube	Heer	General der Infanterie	Commanding general of the LXXIV. Armeekorps	30 September 1944	—	—
610	Georg Graf von Rittberg	Heer	Generalmajor	Commander of the 88. Infanterie-Division	10 October 1944	—	—
611	Mortimer von Kessel	Heer	Generalleutnant	Commander of the 20. Panzer-Division	16 October 1944	—	
612	Willi Koch	Heer	Oberfeldwebel	Leader of the 6./Grenadier-Regiment 32	16 October 1944	—	A man wearing a military uniform with an Iron Cross displayed at the front of his uniform collar.
613	Friedrich Strohm	Heer	Oberstleutnant	Commander of Grenadier-Regiment 470	18 October 1944*	Died of wounds 24 September 1944	—
614	Theodor Krancke	Kriegsmarine	Admiral	Commander-in-chief of Navy Group Command West	18 October 1944	—	—
615	Georg Jakob	Luftwaffe	Major	Geschwaderkommodore of Schlachtgeschwader 10	30 September 1944	—	—
616	Walter Schuck	Luftwaffe	Leutnant	Pilot in the 9./Jagdgeschwader 5	30 September 1944	—	—
617	Dr. jur. Dr. rer. pol. Friedrich-August Freiherr von der Heydte (Note: In German a Doctor of Law is abbreviated as Dr. iur. (Doctor iuris) or Dr. jur. (Doctor juris) and a Doctorate of Economics is abbreviated as Dr. rer. pol. (Doctor rerum politicarum).)	Luftwaffe	Oberstleutnant	Commander of Fallschirmjäger-Regiment 6	30 September 1944	—	A man wearing a military uniform with an Iron Cross displayed at the front of his uniform collar.
618	Herbert Bauer	Luftwaffe	Hauptmann	Gruppenkommandeur of the I./Schlachtgeschwader 2 "Immelmann" (Note: According to Scherzer as Gruppenkommandeur of the II./Schlachtgeschwader 103.)	30 September 1944	—	—
619	Franz Kieslich	Luftwaffe	Hauptmann	Gruppenkommandeur of the III./Schlachtgeschwader 77 (Note: According to Scherzer on 18 October 1944 as leader of the III./Schlachtgeschwader 77.)	10 October 1944	—	—
620	Diether Lukesch	Luftwaffe	Hauptmann	Staffelkapitän of the 9./Kampfgeschwader 76	10 October 1944	—	
621	Wilhelm Bleckwenn	Heer	Oberst	Commander of Grenadier-Regiment 487	18 October 1944	—	—
622	Arthur Jüttner+	Heer	Oberst	Commander of Grenadier-Regiment 532	18 October 1944	Awarded 141st Swords 5 April 1945	—
623	Johann-Georg Richert	Heer	Generalleutnant	Commander of the 35. Infanterie-Division	18 October 1944	—	—
624	Werner Gust	Heer	Major	Leader of Grenadier-Regiment 405	18 October 1944	—	—
625	Othmar Kreuzinger	Heer	Oberleutnant of the Reserves	Chief of the 4./Panzer-Aufklärungs-Abteilung 19	18 October 1944*	Killed in action 3 September 1944	—
626	Franz Weller	Heer	Oberst	Commander of Jäger-Regiment 54	23 October 1944	—	—
627	Karl Thieme+	Heer	Major	Leader of Panzergrenadier-Regiment 111	23 October 1944	Awarded (156th) Swords 9 May 1945? (Note: Karl Thieme's nomination was received by the Heerespersonalamt (HPA—Army Personnel Office) on 10 April 1945 via teleprinter message. Major Joachim Domaschk noted "By no means sufficient! Requesting statement from OB West", which was requested on 13 April. OB West responded on 24 April (entry date at the Heerespersonalamt on 28 April): "Statement from OB West not possible, since nomination was not made via OB West". Major Domaschk then decided on 28 April: "Heeresgruppe B, postpone!" In this instance the nomination was not processed due to AHA 44 Ziff. 572 but also because statements from his commanding officers could not be obtained anymore due to the capitulation. The nomination list for the higher grades of the Knight's Cross of the Iron Cross also contains a note from 10 April 1945: postponed. A bestowal thus did not occur. The Association of Knight's Cross Recipients (AKCR) claims that the award was presented in accordance with the Dönitz-decree. This is illegal according to the Deutsche Dienststelle (WASt) and lacks legal justification. The sequential number "156" was assigned by the AKCR. Fellgiebel assigned the presentation date.)	—
628	Hans-Christian Stock	Heer	Hauptmann	Chief of the 2./Panzer-Jagd-Abteilung 152	23 October 1944	—	—
629	Gustav Schubert	Luftwaffe	Oberleutnant	Pilot in the 9./Schlachtgeschwader 1	24 October 1944	—	—
630	Johann Schalanda	Luftwaffe	Oberleutnant	Staffelkapitän of the 3./Schlachtgeschwader 1	24 October 1944	—	—
631	Helmut Leicht	Luftwaffe	Major	Gruppenkommandeur of the III./Schlachtgeschwader 10	24 October 1944*	Killed in action 26 June 1944	—
632	Günther Tonne	Luftwaffe	Major	Geschwaderkommodore of Schnellkampfgeschwader 10	24 October 1944*	Killed in flying accident 15 July 1943	—
633	Benno Reuter	Heer	Stabsfeldwebel	Leader of the 6./Jäger-Regiment 49	28 October 1944	—	—
634	Paul Ecker	Heer	Major	Commander of the I./Panzergrenadier-Regiment 9	28 October 1944	—	—
635	Paul Freiherr von Hauser	Heer	Oberstleutnant	Commander of Panzergrenadier-Lehr-Regiment 901	28 October 1944	—	—
636	Fritz-Rudolf Schultz	Heer	Major of the Reserves	Leader of Panzer-Regiment 35	28 October 1944	—	—
637	Heinrich Busse	Heer	Oberstleutnant	Commander of Grenadier-Regiment 203	28 October 1944	—	—
638	Eduard Brunner	Heer	Hauptmann	Commander of the I./Grenadier-Regiment 62	28 October 1944 (Note: According to Scherzer on 18 October 1944.)	—	—
639	Max Simon	Waffen-SS	SS-Gruppenführer and Generalleutnant of the Waffen-SS	Commander of 16. SS-Panzergrenadier-Division "Reichsführer-SS"	28 October 1944	—	A man wearing a military uniform, side cap, and glasses.
640	Johannes Blaskowitz+	Heer	Generaloberst	Commander-in-chief of Heeresgruppe G	29 October 1944	Awarded (146th) Swords 25 April 1945	A man wearing a military uniform with an Iron Cross displayed at the front of his uniform collar.
641	Dr. med. vet. Klaus Hilgemann (Note: In German a Doctorate in Veterinary medicine is abbreviated as Dr. med. vet. (Doctor medicinae veterinariae).)	Heer	Major	Commander of the II./Grenadier-Regiment 426	29 October 1944	—	—
642	Gerhard Friedrich	Heer	Oberstleutnant	Commander of Panzergrenadier-Regiment 13	3 November 1944	—	—
643	Maximilian Felzmann	Heer	Generalleutnant	Commander of Korpsabteilung E	3 November 1944	—	—
644	Johann-Heinrich Eckhardt	Heer	Generalleutnant	Commander of the 211. Infanterie-Division	3 November 1944	—	—
645	Werner Hartmann	Kriegsmarine	Kapitän zur See	Leader of the U-Boote in the Mediterranean Sea, before commander of U-198	5 November 1944	—	—
646	Walter Weiß	Heer	Generaloberst	Commander-in-chief of the 2. Armee	5 November 1944	—	A man wearing a military uniform with an Iron Cross displayed at the front of his uniform collar.
647	Gustav-Adolf von Zangen	Heer	General der Infanterie	Acting commander-in-chief of the 15. Armee	5 November 1944	—	A man wearing a military uniform with an Iron Cross displayed at the front of his uniform collar sits behind a desk.
648	Gerd Ruge	Heer	Major	Leader of Panzergrenadier-Regiment 128	16 November 1944	—	—
649	Wilhelm Weidenbrück	Heer	Major	Commander of Panzer-Abteilung of Panzer-Brigade 104 (Note: According to Scherzer as commander of Panzer-Abteilung 2104.)	16 November 1944	—	—
650	Helmut Dörner+	Waffen-SS	SS-Standartenführer	Commander of SS-Panzergrenadier-Regiment 8	16 November 1944	Awarded 129th Swords 1 February 1945	—
651	Albrecht Krügel	Waffen-SS	SS-Obersturmbannführer	Commander of SS-Freiwilligen-Panzergrenadier-Regiment 24 "Danmark"	16 November 1944	—	—
652	Emil Badorrek	Luftwaffe	Major	Staffelkapitän of the 4./Fernaufklärungs-Gruppe 11 (Note: According to Scherzer as Staffelkapitän of the Aufklärungsstaffel 4.(F)/11.)	18 November 1944	—	—
653	Klaus Mietusch	Luftwaffe	Major	Gruppenkommandeur of the III./Jagdgeschwader 26 "Schlageter"	18 November 1944*	Killed in action 17 September 1944	Mietusch stands inside his open aircraft cockpit wearing full flight gear.
654	Heinz Meyer	Luftwaffe	Hauptmann of the Reserves (Note: According to Scherzer as Hauptmann (War Officer).)	Leader of the III./Fallschirmjäger-Regiment 15	18 November 1944	—	A man wearing a military uniform with an Iron Cross displayed at the front of his uniform collar.
655	Wilhelm Antrup	Luftwaffe	Oberstleutnant	Geschwaderkommodore of Kampfgeschwader 55	18 November 1944	—	—
656	Heinrich Höfer	Luftwaffe	Major	Gruppenkommandeur of the II./Kampfgeschwader 55	18 November 1944	—	—
657	Gerhart Schirmer	Luftwaffe	Oberstleutnant	Commander of Fallschirmjäger-Regiment 16	18 November 1944	—	—
658	Hans Seidemann	Luftwaffe	Generalleutnant	Commanding general of the VIII. Fliegerkorps	18 November 1944	—	
659	Hans Hoßfeld	Kriegsmarine	Korvettenkapitän (Marine Artillerie—Naval artillery) (Note: According to Scherzer as Kapitänleutnant (Marine Artillerie M.A.—Naval artillery) and not Korvettenkapitän (M.A.). Hans Hoßfeld was promoted to Korvettenkapitän (M.A.) posthumously.)	Commander of Marine-Artillerie Abteilung 531	25 November 1944*	Killed in action 19 November 1944	—
660	Werner Dörnbrack	Luftwaffe	Major	Gruppenkommandeur of the I./Schlachtgeschwader 4	25 November 1944	—	—
661	Hubert Pölz	Luftwaffe	Hauptmann	Acting Gruppenkommandeur of the I./Schlachtgeschwader 151	25 November 1944	—	—
662	Rudolf Witzig	Luftwaffe	Major	Commander of the I./Fallschirm-Pionier-Regiment 21	25 November 1944	—	—
663	Georg-Peter Eder	Luftwaffe	Hauptmann	Staffelkapitän of the 6./Jagdgeschwader 1	25 November 1944	—	—
664	Rudolf Rennecke	Luftwaffe	Major	Leader of Fallschirmjäger-Regiment 1	25 November 1944	—	—
665	Otto Dommeratzky	Luftwaffe	Leutnant	Staffelführer in the 6./Schlachtgeschwader 2 "Immelmann"	25 November 1944*	Killed in action 13 October 1944	—
666	Karl Kennel	Luftwaffe	Hauptmann	Gruppenkommandeur of the II./Schlachtgeschwader 2 "Immelmann"	25 November 1944	—	—
667	Gerhard Michalski	Luftwaffe	Major	Geschwaderkommodore of Jagdgeschwader 4	25 November 1944	—	—
668	Gerhard Bremer	Waffen-SS	SS-Sturmbannführer	Commander of SS-Panzer-Aufklärungs-Abteilung 12 "Hitlerjugend"	26 November 1944	—	—
669	Klaus von Bismarck	Heer	Major (Note: According to Scherzer as Major of the Reserves.)	Leader of Grenadier-Regiment 4	26 November 1944	—	A man wearing a black suit, white shirt, and tie.
670	Artur Phleps	Waffen-SS	SS-Obergruppenführer and General of the Waffen-SS	Commanding general of the V. SS-Gebirgs-Armeekorps and Higher SS and Police leader as well as commander-in-chief in Siebenbürgen	24 November 1944*	Killed in action 21 September 1944	
671	Otto Wöhler	Heer	General der Infanterie	Commander-in-chief of the 8. Armee	28 November 1944	—	A man wearing a military uniform with an Iron Cross displayed at the front of his uniform collar.
672	Helmuth Reymann	Heer	Generalleutnant	Commander of the 11. Infanterie-Division	28 November 1944	—	
673	Curt Ehle	Heer	Major of the Reserves	Leader of Panzer-Brigade 102	29 November 1944	—	—
674	Kurt Maier	Luftwaffe	Hauptmann	Staffelkapitän of the 9./Kampfgeschwader 1 "Hindenburg" (Note: According to Scherzer as Staffelkapitän in the III./Kampfgeschwader 1 "Hindenburg".)	6 December 1944	—	—
675	Georg Sattler	Luftwaffe	Oberleutnant	Staffelkapitän of the 1.(K)/Lehrgeschwader 1	6 December 1944*	Killed in flying accident 30 August 1944	—
676	Walther Hahm	Heer	Generalleutnant	Commander of the 389. Infanterie-Division	9 December 1944	—	—
677	Christian Braun	Heer	Oberfeldwebel	Machine gun Zugführer (platoon leader) in the 8./Grenadier-Regiment 308 (Note: According to Scherzer as leader of the II. Zug/ 8./Grenadier-Regiment 308.)	9 December 1944	—	—
678	Fritz Arndt	Heer	Feldwebel	Zugführer (platoon leader) in the 1./Panzer-Pionier-Bataillon 32	9 December 1944	—	—
679	Gerhard Engel	Heer	Generalmajor	Commander of the 12. Volksgrenadier-Division	11 December 1944	—	A man wearing a military uniform with an Iron Cross displayed at the front of his uniform collar.
680	Jürgen Wagner	Waffen-SS	SS-Brigadeführer and Generalmajor of the Waffen-SS	Commander of the 4. SS-Freiwilligen-Panzergrenadier-Brigade "Nederland"	11 December 1944	—	
681	Friedrich Jakob	Heer	Major	Leader of Grenadier-Regiment 1149	18 December 1944	—	—
682	Harry Hoppe	Heer	Generalleutnant	Commander of the 278. Infanterie-Division	18 December 1944	—	—
683	Eduard Crasemann	Heer	Generalmajor	Commander of the 26. Panzer-Division	18 December 1944	—	—
684	Andreas Kuffner	Luftwaffe	Hauptmann	Staffelkapitän of the 10.(Panzer)/Schlachtgeschwader 3	20 December 1944	—	—
685	Fritz Biermeier	Waffen-SS	SS-Sturmbannführer	Commander of the II./SS-Panzer-Regiment 3 "Totenkopf"	26 December 1944*	Killed in action 11 October 1944	—
686	Paul Klatt	Heer	Generalleutnant	Commander of the 3. Gebirgs-Division	26 December 1944	—	A man wearing a military uniform with an Iron Cross displayed at the front of his uniform collar.
687	Günther-Eberhardt Wisliceny+	Waffen-SS	SS-Obersturmbannführer	Commander of SS-Panzergrenadier-Regiment 3 "Deutschland"	26 December 1944	Awarded (151st) Swords 6 May 1945? (Note: No evidence of the award can be found in the German Federal Archives. The award was unlawfully presented by SS-Oberstgruppenführer Sepp Dietrich. The date is taken from the announcement made by the 6. SS-Panzerarmee. The sequential number "151" was assigned by the Association of Knight's Cross Recipients (AKCR). Wisliceny was member of the AKCR.)	A man in semi profile wearing a military uniform. His hair is combed back and his facial expression is determined.
688	Otto Weidinger+	Waffen-SS	SS-Obersturmbannführer	Commander of SS-Panzergrenadier-Regiment 4 "Der Führer"	26 December 1944	Awarded (150th) Swords 6 May 1945? (Note: No evidence of the award can be found in the German Federal Archives. The award was unlawfully presented by SS-Oberstgruppenführer Sepp Dietrich. The date is taken from the announcement made by the 6. SS-Panzerarmee. The sequential number "150" was assigned by the Association of Knight's Cross Recipients (AKCR). Weidinger was member of the AKCR.)	A man wearing a military uniform, peaked cap, and a neck order in the shape of a cross. His cap has an emblem in shape of a human skull and crossed bones.
