= Arboretum Burgholz =

Arboretum in North Rhine-Westphalia, Germany

Coordinates: 51°16′N 7°11′E

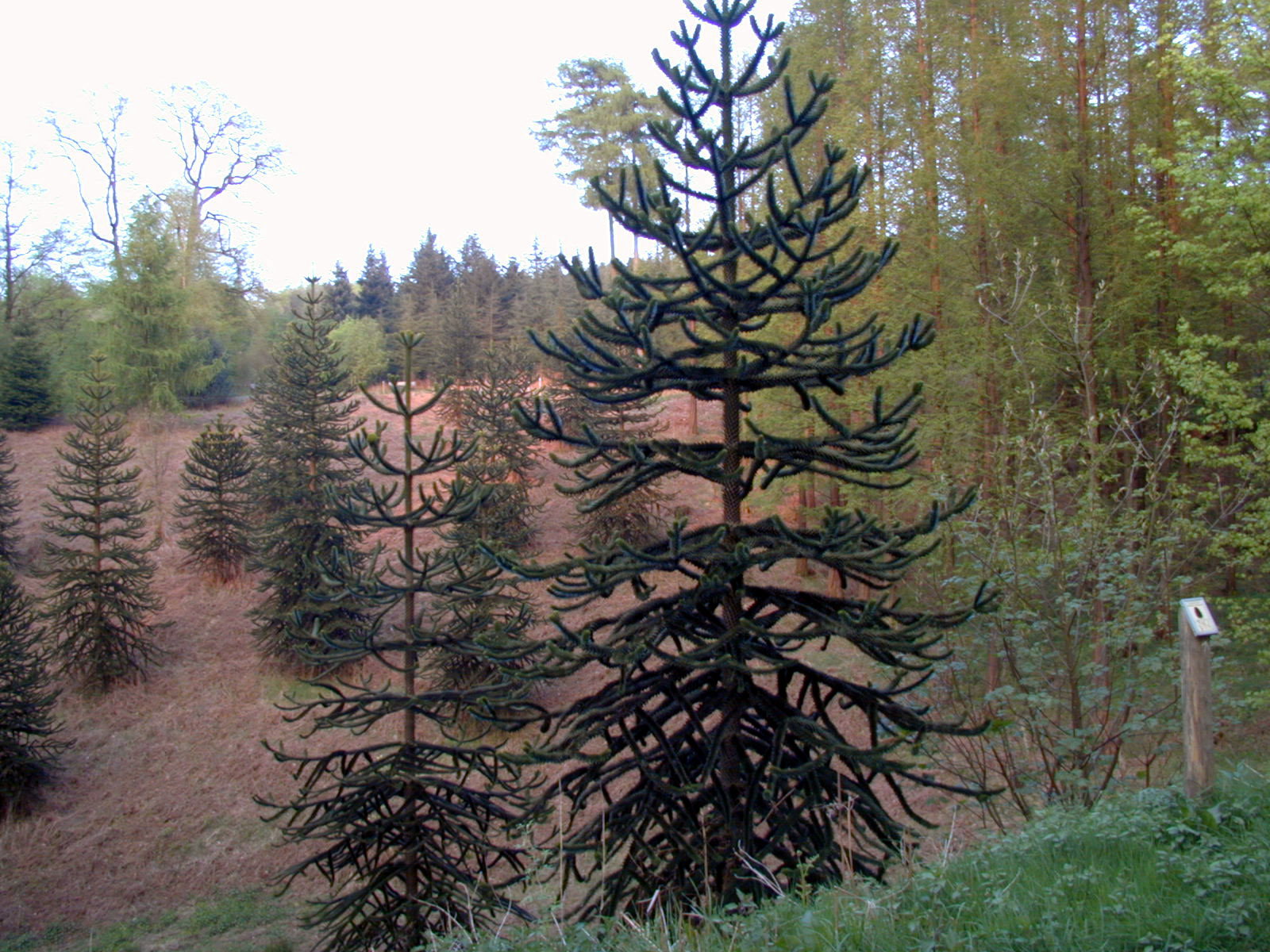
Arboretum Burgholz

The Arboretum Burgholz (about 250 hectares) is an arboretum maintained by the Landesbetrieb Wald und Holz NRW. It is located in the Staatsforst Burgholz at Friedensstraße 69, Wuppertal, North Rhine-Westphalia, Germany, and is open daily without charge.

The arboretum was begun before 1900 to test the suitability of exotic tree species for forestry, and became an arboretum in large part through the efforts of forester Heinrich Hogrebe (1913–1998). It now contains over 130 deciduous and coniferous tree species arranged in North American, Asian, and Mediterranean plantings, with four marked hiking trails.

== See also ==
- List of botanical gardens in Germany
