= Roland von Hößlin =

German Army officer and 20 July plotter (1915–1944)

- Born: 21 February 1915; Munich, Kingdom of Bavaria, German Empire
- Died: 13 October 1944 (aged 29); Plötzensee Prison, Berlin, Nazi Germany
- Military career
- Allegiance: Nazi Germany
- Branch: Army
- Service years: 1933–44
- Rank: Major
- Conflicts: World War II
- Awards: Knight's Cross of the Iron Cross

Roland-Heinrich von Hößlin, or Hösslin (21 February 1915 – 13 October 1944) was a German Army officer involved in the 20 July Plot to kill Adolf Hitler.

== Career ==
Roland von Hößlin was born in Munich into an old family of cavalry officers. In 1933, aged 17, he joined the Reichswehr and became an ensign ("Fahnenjunker") in Mounted Regiment 17 in Bamberg. In 1936, he was promoted to lieutenant. In 1939, during the Second World War, he took part in the Invasion of Poland as a first lieutenant and adjutant in Reconnaissance Detachment 10. He later had tank training at the Panzertruppenschule in Krampnitz, now part of Potsdam, and from March to July 1941 was a staff officer with the Afrika Korps staff in Tripolitania under Field Marshal Erwin Rommel. In August 1941, Hößlin was named chief of the 3rd Reconnaissance Detachment 33, and in February 1942 he was promoted to captain. On 12 July 1942, he was badly wounded while commanding Reconnaissance Detachment 33 in action and was awarded the Knight's Cross of the Iron Cross.

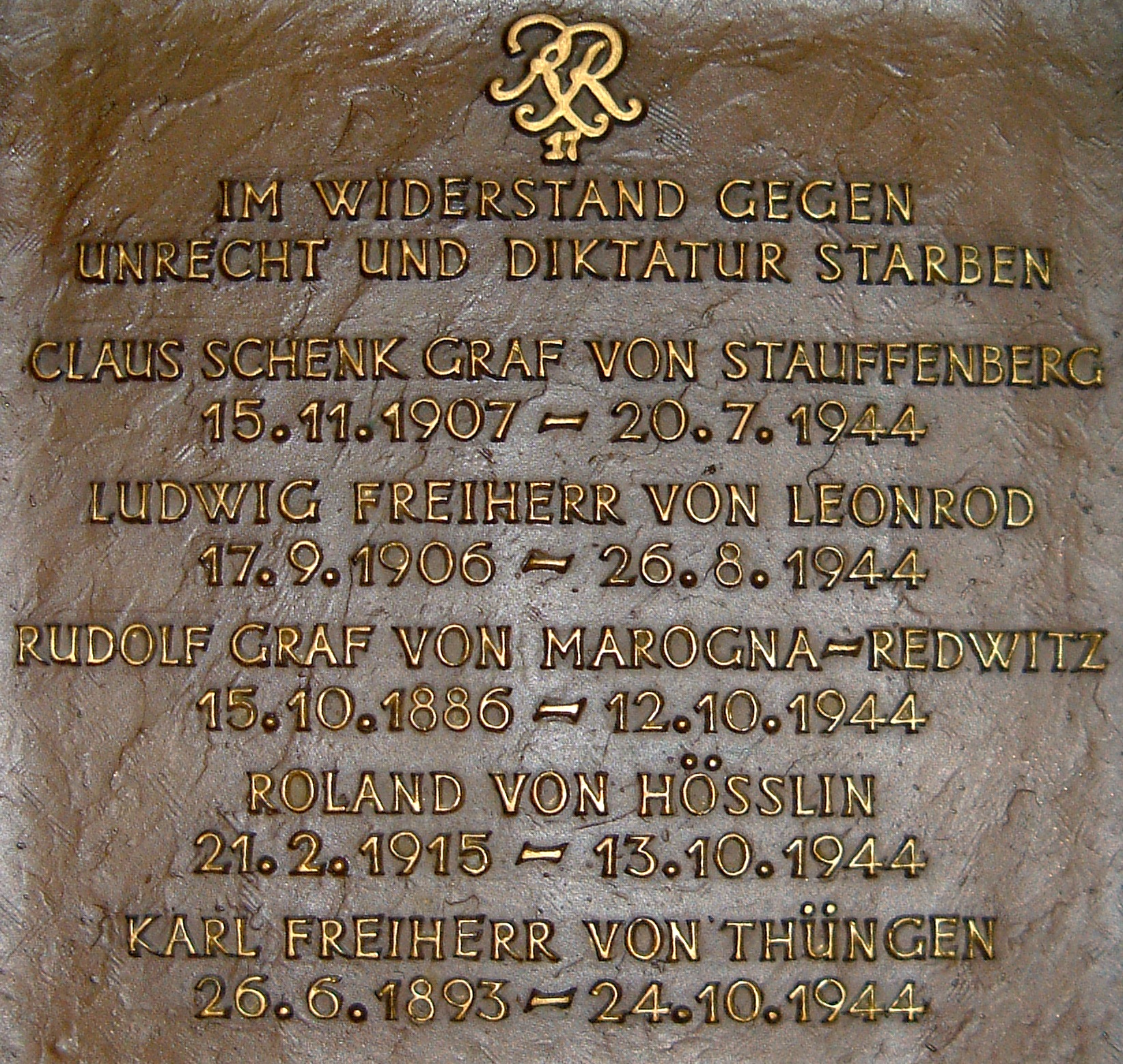
a plaque commemorates the five "Bamberg Troopers"

By February 1944, Hößlin was commander of Officer-Candidate Training Detachment 24 based at Insterburg, East Prussia. In April 1944, through his earlier friendship with Stauffenberg, he was let in on the 20 July Plotters' plans to overthrow Adolf Hitler. In the event of a successful coup d'état, Hößlin was to have his unit in Wehrkreis I (i.e., East Prussia) occupy important buildings and take other measures against the Nazi régime.

On 23 August 1944, however, Hößlin was arrested by the Gestapo, and shortly thereafter was ejected from the Wehrmacht. Hößlin, in connection with the 20 July plot, a failed attempt to assassinate Adolf Hitler, was deprived of all honours, ranks and orders and dishonourably discharged from the army on 14 September 1944. On 13 October 1944, Hößlin was sentenced to death by the Volksgerichtshof under Roland Freisler and hanged that same afternoon at Plötzensee Prison in Berlin. At Bamberg Cathedral, a plaque commemorates the five "Bamberg Troopers" – among them Roland von Hößlin – who gave their lives in the struggle against the Nazi régime.

== Awards ==
- Knight's Cross of the Iron Cross on 23 July 1942 as Hauptmann and leader of Panzer-Aufklärungs-Abteilung 33
