= Hermann Hölter =

German modern pentathlete

- Born: 31 January 1900; Lemgo, Principality of Lippe, German Empire
- Died: 5 May 1989 (aged 89); Boll near Göppingen, Baden-Württemberg, West Germany
- Military career
- Allegiance: German Empire; Weimar Republic; Nazi Germany
- Branch: German Army
- Service years: 1917–1945
- Rank: Generalleutnant
- Unit: 20th Mountain Army
- Conflicts: World War II
- Awards: Knight's Cross of the Iron Cross
- Sports career
- Sport: Modern pentathlon

Hermann Hölter (31 January 1900 – 5 May 1989) was a German modern pentathlete and Generalleutnant during World War II. He competed at the 1928 Summer Olympics. Generalleutnant Hölter served as Chef des Generalstabs (chief of staff) of the 20th Mountain Army. After the war he was held prisoner of war at Island Farm (Special Camp 11).

== Awards ==
- Iron Cross (1914)
  - 2nd Class (18 June 1918)
- Wehrmacht Long Service Award
- Clasp to the Iron Cross (1939)
  - 2nd Class (25 October 1939)
- Iron Cross (1939)
  - 1st Class (14 May 1940)
- Finnish Order of the Cross of Liberty, 2nd Class with Swords (26 September 1941)
- German Cross in Gold on 17 August 1944 as Generalmajor in the Oberkommando of the 20th Mountain Army
- Knight's Cross of the Iron Cross on 3 May 1945 as Generalleutnant and chief of staff of the 20th Mountain Army (Note: No evidence regarding the presentation of the Knight's Cross of the Iron Cross to Hermann Hölter can be found in the German Federal Archives. The presumed presentation to Hölter was discussed three times by the order commission of the Association of Knight's Cross Recipients (AKCR). The chairman was Walther-Peer Fellgiebel and the ruling in 1976/76 was "no", in 1981/82 "yes 3 May 1945" and "no" again in 1983/84. Fellgiebel chose to list him in his 1986 published book. Apparently Hölter presented his pay book as evidence in 1981. This evidence had been accepted by Fellgiebel at the time. What motivated Fellgiebel to strike him from the list again two years later only to add him again remains unanswered. A presentation is questionable for two reasons. First, Hitler banned presentation for pure leadership reasons on 10 March 1945. As of this date, the Knight's Cross could only be presented for personal bravery. There was no noteworthy combat in Norway in 1945, and Hölter was a member of the general staff and not in command of any direct combatants. Scherzer states that the presentation date suggests that it is an assumption or manipulation. The presentation date is closely linked to the radio communication for the empowerment for autonomous presentations. Hölter was a member of the AKCR.)
