= Schlachtgeschwader 10 =

- Active: 1943 – 1945
- Country: Nazi Germany
- Branch: Luftwaffe
- Type: Dive bomber
- Role: Close air support
- Size: Air Force Wing

Aircraft flown
- Attack: Fw 190

Schlachtgeschwader 10 (SG 10) was a close air support wing in the Luftwaffe of Nazi Germany during World War II. The Geschwader was formed on 18 October 1943 in Berdychiv from the Stab of Schnellkampfgeschwader 10. I. Gruppe (I./SG 10) formed from I./Schnellkampfgeschwader 2, II. Gruppe (II./SG 10) from IV./Schnellkampfgeschwader 10 and III. Gruppe (III./SG 10) from II./Sturzkampfgeschwader 77.

== Commanding officers ==
- Oberstleutnant Helmut Viedebantt, December 1943 – July 1944
- Oberstleutnant Georg Jakob, 30 January 1945 – 8 May 1945

== Bibliography ==
- de Zeng, Henry L., IV & Stankey, Douglas G. (2013). Dive-Bomber and Ground-Attack Units of the Luftwaffe 1933-1945. Vol. 2. Hersham, UK: Classic Publications. ISBN 978-1-906537-09-8.
