= Heinrich Höfer =

German Luftwaffe pilot (1911–1996)

- Born: 14 July 1911; Bad Oeynhausen, German Empire
- Died: 2 January 1996 (aged 84); Bad Oeynhausen, Germany
- Military career
- Allegiance: Weimar Republic (to 1933); Nazi Germany
- Branch: Heer (1929–35); Luftwaffe (1935–45)
- Service years: 1929–45
- Rank: Major
- Commands: II./Kampfgeschwader 55
- Conflicts: World War II: Invasion of Poland; Battle of France; Battle of Britain; Operation Barbarossa; Battle of Kiev (1941); Siege of Sevastopol (1941–1942); Battle of Stalingrad; Battle of Kursk; Italian Campaign
- Awards: Knight's Cross of the Iron Cross with Oak Leaves

Karl Heinrich Höfer (14 July 1911 – 2 January 1996) was a highly decorated Major in the Luftwaffe during World War II, and one of only 882 recipients of the Knight's Cross of the Iron Cross with Oak Leaves. The Knight's Cross of the Iron Cross, and its variants were the highest awards in the military and paramilitary forces of Nazi Germany during World War II.

== Awards and decorations ==
- Aviator badge
- Front Flying Clasp of the Luftwaffe
- Iron Cross (1939)
  - 2nd Class (16 September 1939) (Note: According to Thomas on 12 September 1939.)
  - 1st Class (12 June 1941) (Note: According to Thomas on 23 June 1940.)
- Ehrenpokal der Luftwaffe (18 November 1941)
- German Cross in Gold on 16 July 1942 as Hauptmann in the Stab/Kampfgeschwader 55
- Knight's Cross of the Iron Cross with Oak Leaves
  - Knight's Cross on 3 September 1943 as Hauptmann and Gruppenkommandeur of II./Kampfgeschwader 55
  - 656th Oak Leaves on 18 November 1944 as Major and Gruppenkommandeur of II./Kampfgeschwader 55
