= Heinrich Hogrebe =

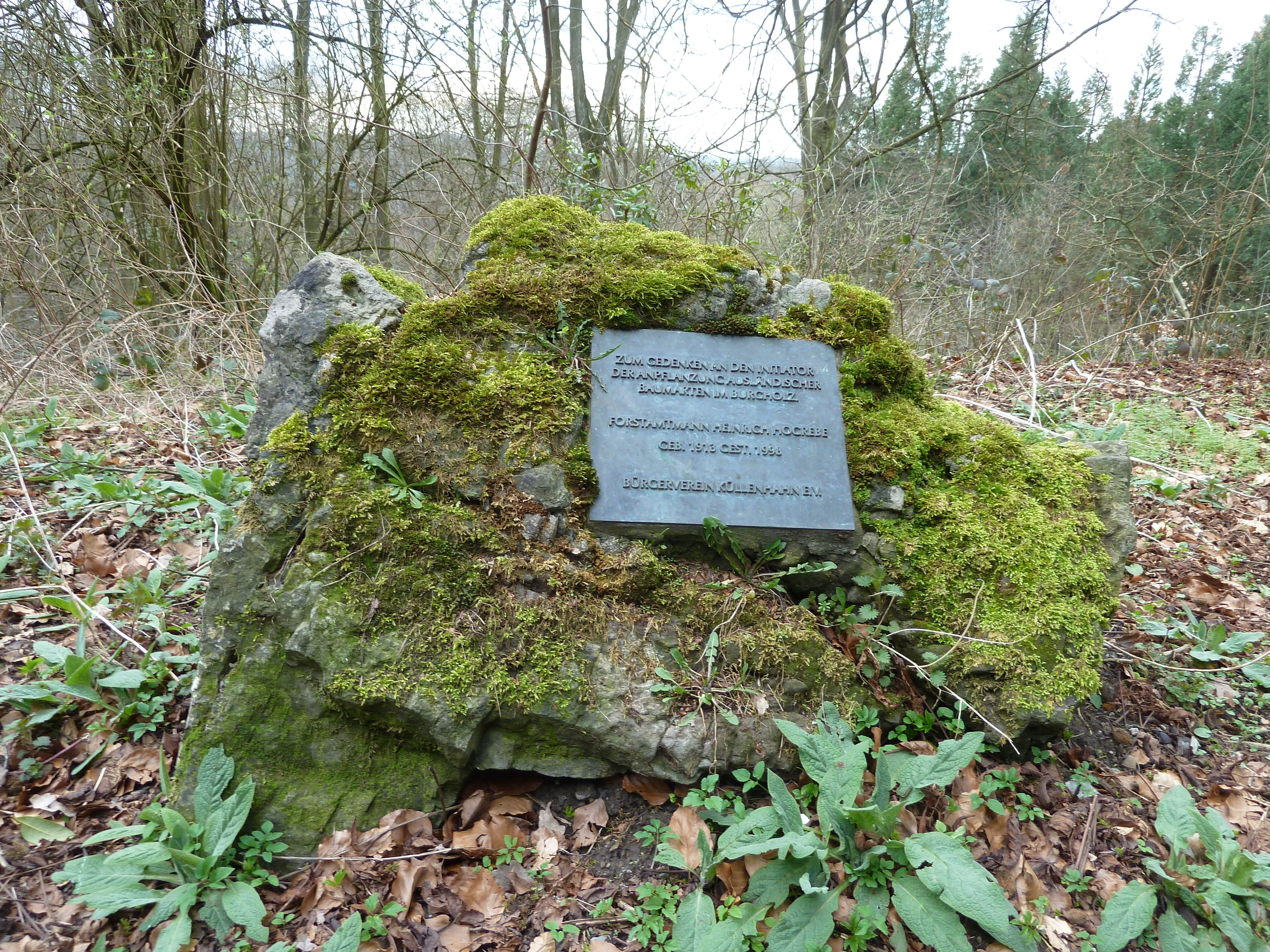
Memorial site dedicated to Hogrebe to honor his forestry researches

Heinrich Hogrebe (22 June 1913 – 25 June 1998) was a German forester who was a recipient of Order of Merit of the Federal Republic of Germany to honor his forestry researches and the creation of the Arboretum Burgholz. During World War II, he served as an officer in the Wehrmacht of Nazi Germany and was a recipient of the Knight's Cross of the Iron Cross with Oak Leaves.

== Awards and decorations ==
- Iron Cross (1939) 2nd Class (25 June 1941) & 1st Class (22 August 1941)
- German Cross in Gold on 14 April 1942 as Leutnant of the Reserves in the 1./Infanterie-Regiment 422
- Knight's Cross of the Iron Cross with Oak Leaves
  - Knight's Cross on 17 August 1942 as Oberleutnant of the Reserves and chief of the 5./Infanterie-Regiment 422
  - Oak Leaves on 13 April 1944 as Hauptmann and commander of II./Grenadier-Regiment 422
- Order of Merit of the Federal Republic of Germany (1977)
