= Zugführer (military) =

Military appointment

Standard NATO military map symbol for a friendly infantry Zug/platoon.

Zugführer ([ˈt͡suːkˌfyːʁɐ], lit. 'platoon leader') is a military appointment to a sub-subunit leader, e.g. platoon leader, belonging to the Non-commissioned officer (NCO) rank group or junior officer. A Zugführer leads or commands normally a subunit that is called in German language Zug (en: platoon, platoon-size unit, or detachment).

== Germany ==
Zugführer (ZgFhr) of the Bundeswehr is an appointment. The Zugführer is a subunit leader and commands a Zug (in the following platoon) that – depending on the service, branch, or branch of service – normally contains 30 to 60 service members or soldiers. The Bundeswehr platoon consists of some groups; some platoons build a company (infantry), battery (artillery), or squadron (Air Force).

To the appointment of Zugführer might be assigned normally an officer (2nd lieutenant of 1st lieutenant to the I. and II. platoon of a company), or an experienced portepee-NCO with the rank Hauptfeldwebel or Stabsfeldwebel (III. and IV. platoon of a company). However, in the German special command and support troops (de: Führungsunterstützungstruppen) to platoon leader might be appointed an OF2-rank captain or an experienced NCO Oberstabsfeldwebel (OR9) as well.

In flying squadrons of all Bundeswehr military branches the appointment flight commander/leader (de: Schwarmführer) is approximately equivalent to platoon leader. Assigned will be an OF2-rank captain or a staff officer, because pilot officers they themselves are normally officer ranks.

At German military academies the designation of the appropriate appointment is Hörsaalleiter (lecture hall leader), and will be by filled with an officer.

=== Nazi Germany ===
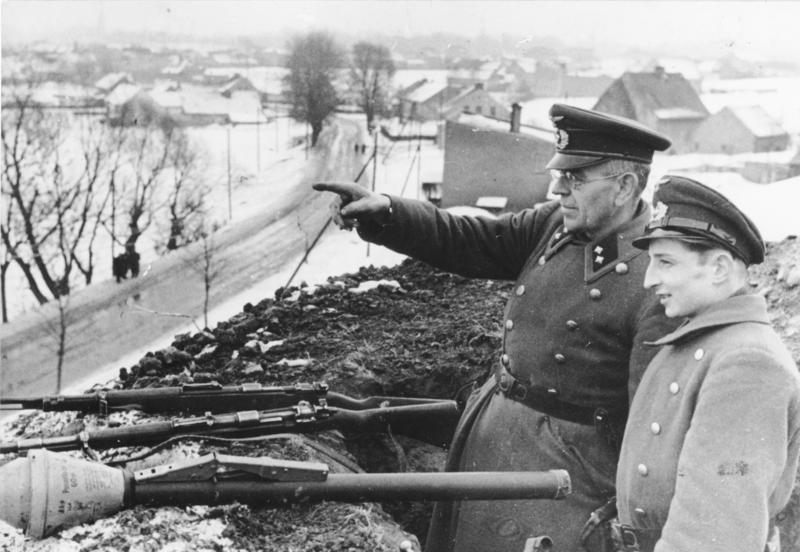
Volkssturm Zugführer (left) with a teenaged Volkssturm member

The title of Zugführer was also a paramilitary title of Nazi Germany which is most often associated with the Volkssturm. Translated as "Platoon Leader", a Zugführer of the Volkssturm would oversee a platoon sized formation of Volkssturmmann. An army platoon is unusually led by a Leutnant, therefore, this rank was similar to that level. There was no established uniform for the rank, other than any particular military or paramilitary uniform already used by the holder of the position. Zugführer was further a regular positional title used in both the Heer (army) and the Waffen-SS.

==== Insignia ====
Volkssturm Gorget patches

Postschutz shoulder strap

== Switzerland ==
In the Military of Switzerland the Zugführer (en: platoon leader) is an appointment as well. Here the platoon is commanded by an OF1-rank 2nd Lieutenant or 1st Lieutenant. In exceptional cases might be assigned a Zugführerstellvertreter (platoon leader deputy) with the rank Oberwachtmeister. Platoons of the new Schweizer Armee logistic troops will be commanded by so-called Logistikzugführer (Log Zfhr) with the rank of Adjutant-Unteroffizier (en: Adjudant-NCO).

== Austria ==
As opposed to Germany and Switzerland, in the Austrian Bundesheer the designation of platoon leader is Zugskommandant. It should not be mixed up with the enlisted rank Zugsführer
