= List of Knight's Cross of the Iron Cross recipients (R) =

The Knight's Cross of the Iron Cross (German: Ritterkreuz des Eisernen Kreuzes) and its variants were the highest awards in the military and paramilitary forces of Nazi Germany during World War II. The Knight's Cross of the Iron Cross was awarded for a wide range of reasons and across all ranks, from a senior commander for skilled leadership of his troops in battle to a low-ranking soldier for a single act of extreme gallantry. A total of 7,321 awards were made between its first presentation on 30 September 1939 and its last bestowal on 17 June 1945. (Note: Großadmiral and President of Germany Karl Dönitz, Hitler's successor as Head of State (Staatsoberhaupt) and Supreme Commander of the Armed Forces, had ordered the cessation of all promotions and awards as of 11 May 1945 (Dönitz-decree). Consequently the last Knight's Cross awarded to Oberleutnant zur See of the Reserves Georg-Wolfgang Feller on 17 June 1945 must therefore be considered a de facto but not de jure hand-out.) This number is based on the analysis and acceptance of the order commission of the Association of Knight's Cross Recipients (AKCR). Presentations were made to members of the three military branches of the Wehrmacht—the Heer (Army), Kriegsmarine (Navy) and Luftwaffe (Air Force)—as well as the Waffen-SS, the Reichsarbeitsdienst (RAD—Reich Labour Service) and the Volkssturm (German national militia). There were also 43 recipients in the military forces of allies of the Third Reich.

These recipients are listed in the 1986 edition of Walther-Peer Fellgiebel's book, Die Träger des Ritterkreuzes des Eisernen Kreuzes 1939–1945 [The Bearers of the Knight's Cross of the Iron Cross 1939–1945]. Fellgiebel was the former chairman and head of the order commission of the AKCR. In 1996, the second edition of this book was published with an addendum delisting 11 of these original recipients. Author Veit Scherzer has cast doubt on a further 193 of these listings. The majority of the disputed recipients had been nominated for the award in 1945, when the deteriorating situation of Germany during the final days of World War II left a number of nominations incomplete and pending in various stages of the approval process.

Listed here are the 448 Knight's Cross recipients of the Wehrmacht and Waffen-SS whose last name starts with "R". The AKCR named 447 recipients. Scherzer has challenged the validity of 11 of these listings but also identified one additional legitimate recipient, Siegfried Rieger. The recipients are initially ordered alphabetically by last name. The rank listed is the recipient's rank at the time the Knight's Cross was awarded.

== Background ==
The Knight's Cross of the Iron Cross and its higher grades were based on four separate enactments. The first enactment, Reichsgesetzblatt I S. 1573 of 1 September 1939 instituted the Iron Cross (Eisernes Kreuz), the Knight's Cross of the Iron Cross and the Grand Cross of the Iron Cross (Großkreuz des Eisernen Kreuzes). Article 2 of the enactment mandated that the award of a higher class be preceded by the award of all preceding classes. As the war progressed, some of the recipients of the Knight's Cross distinguished themselves further and a higher grade, the Knight's Cross of the Iron Cross with Oak Leaves (Ritterkreuz des Eisernen Kreuzes mit Eichenlaub), was instituted. The Oak Leaves, as they were commonly referred to, were based on the enactment Reichsgesetzblatt I S. 849 of 3 June 1940. In 1941, two higher grades of the Knight's Cross were instituted. The enactment Reichsgesetzblatt I S. 613 of 28 September 1941 introduced the Knight's Cross of the Iron Cross with Oak Leaves and Swords (Ritterkreuz des Eisernen Kreuzes mit Eichenlaub und Schwertern) and the Knight's Cross of the Iron Cross with Oak Leaves, Swords and Diamonds (Ritterkreuz des Eisernen Kreuzes mit Eichenlaub, Schwertern und Brillanten). At the end of 1944 the final grade, the Knight's Cross of the Iron Cross with Golden Oak Leaves, Swords, and Diamonds (Ritterkreuz des Eisernen Kreuzes mit goldenem Eichenlaub, Schwertern und Brillanten), based on the enactment Reichsgesetzblatt 1945 I S. 11 of 29 December 1944, became the final variant of the Knight's Cross authorized.

== Recipients ==
Knight's Cross of the Iron Cross (R)
Service	Number of presentations	Posthumous presentations
Heer	295	22
Kriegsmarine	16	0
Luftwaffe	98	14
Waffen-SS	39	5

The Oberkommando der Wehrmacht (Supreme Command of the Armed Forces) kept separate Knight's Cross lists for the Heer (Army), Kriegsmarine (Navy), Luftwaffe (Air Force) and Waffen-SS. Within each of these lists a unique sequential number was assigned to each recipient. The same numbering paradigm was applied to the higher grades of the Knight's Cross, one list per grade. Of the 448 awards made to servicemen whose last name starts with "R", 46 were later awarded the Knight's Cross of the Iron Cross with Oak Leaves, eight the Knight's Cross of the Iron Cross with Oak Leaves and Swords, two the Knight's Cross of the Iron Cross with Oak Leaves, Swords and Diamonds and one the Knight's Cross of the Iron Cross with Golden Oak Leaves, Swords and Diamonds; 41 presentations were made posthumously. Heer members received 295 of the medals, including the additional recipient identified by Scherzer; 16 went to the Kriegsmarine, 98 to the Luftwaffe, and 39 to the Waffen-SS. The sequential numbers greater than 843 for the Knight's Cross of the Iron Cross with Oak Leaves are unofficial and were assigned by the Association of Knight's Cross Recipients (AKCR) and are therefore denoted in parentheses.

This along with the + (plus) indicates that a higher grade of Knight's Cross was awarded as well.
This along with the * (asterisk) indicates that the Knight's Cross was awarded posthumously.
This along with the ? (question mark) indicates that historian Veit Scherzer has expressed doubt regarding the veracity and formal correctness of the listing.

Name	Service	Rank	Role and unit (Note: For an explanation of the various naming schemes used by the Luftwaffe, Heer, Kriegsmarine and Waffen-SS refer to nomenclature used by the Wehrmacht and Waffen-SS.)	Date of award	Notes	Image
Alexander Raab	Luftwaffe	Oberleutnant	Staffelkapitän in the I./Kampfgeschwader 77	5 September 1944	—	—
Josef Raab	Heer	Hauptmann	Leader of a Kampfgruppe in Grenadier-Regiment 77	16 October 1944	—	—
Günter Raabe	Heer	Leutnant of the Reserves	Vorgeschobener Beobachter (forward observer) in the 6./Artillerie-Regiment 161	10 September 1944	—	—
Friedrich Raaf	Heer	Leutnant of the Reserves (Note: According to Scherzer as Leutnant.)	Chief of the 7./Panzergrenadier-Regiment 21	18 January 1945	—	—
Johann Rab	Heer	Oberleutnant	Chief of the 1./Panzer-Pionier-Bataillon 79	10 June 1943*	Died of wounds 30 March 1943	—
Herbert Rabben	Luftwaffe	Oberfeldwebel	Pilot in the 3./Schlachtgeschwader 77 (Note: According to Scherzer as pilot in the I./Schlachtgeschwader 77.)	4 May 1944	—	—
Friedrich-Carl Rabe von Pappenheim	Heer	Generalleutnant	Commander of the 97. Jäger-Division	30 April 1945	—	—
Kurt Radeck	Heer	Hauptmann	Leader of the I./Grenadier-Regiment 176	23 February 1944	—	—
Hans Radel	Heer	Oberfeldwebel	Zugführer (platoon leader) in the 1./Grenadier-Regiment 4	23 February 1944	—	—
Emil Rademacher (Note: According to Scherzer his name is Emil Rademann.)	Luftwaffe	Gefreiter	Group leader in Fallschirm-Pionier-Bataillon 1 "Hermann Göring"	23 February 1945	—	—
Rudolf Rademacher	Luftwaffe	Leutnant	Pilot in the 1./Jagdgeschwader 54	30 September 1944	—	—
Waldemar Radener (Note: According to Scherzer later named Waldemar Radener-Blaschke.)	Luftwaffe	Oberleutnant	Leader of the II./Jagdgeschwader 26 "Schlageter"	12 March 1945	—	—
Karl Radermacher	Heer	Gefreiter	Grenade launcher troop leader in the 6./Grenadier-Regiment 45	4 May 1944	—	—
Albert Radesinsky	Heer	Obergefreiter	Heavy machine gunner in the 4./Gebirgsjäger-Regiment 138	7 December 1943*	Died of wounds 7 November 1943	—
Helmut Radochla? (Note: Helmut Radochla's nomination by the troop was received by Heerespersonalamt (HPA—Army Staff Office) on 21 March 1945. The nomination had been submitted by the 212. Volksgrenadier Division, to which the 2./Festungs-Infanterie-Bataillon had been subordinated at the time, via the Heeresgruppe B. Radochla is listed with a sequential Nr. 5156 in the book "Verliehene Ritterkreuze" (Awarded Knight Crosses). However only the entry date of 21 March along with Major Joachim Domaschk's recommendation "Knight's Cross yes" was noted. No further proof that the presentation was made can be found in the archives. A file card for the list of approved or rejected nominations had been created. The 212. Volksgrenadier Division, and thus the 2./Festungs-Infanterie-Bataillon, had been encircled and taken prisoner of war in the vicinity of Baumholder by American forces at the time of the presentation. The commanding general of the 212. Volksgrenadier Division, Generalleutnant Franz Sensfuß, who had been nominated for the Oak Leaves at the same time, was postponed by Major Domaschk in accordance with AHA 44 Ziff. 572. Veit Scherzer argues that with a very high probability Major Domaschk, without noting, also deferred the decision on Radochla. According to the Association of Knight's Cross Recipients (AKCR) the award was presented in accordance with the Dönitz-decree. This is illegal according to the Deutsche Dienststelle (WASt) and lacks legal justification. The presentation date was assigned by Walther-Peer Fellgiebel.)	Heer	Leutnant	Zugführer (platoon leader) in the 2./Festungs-Infanterie-Bataillon XXIII./999	9 May 1945	—	—
Joseph von Radowitz+	Heer	Oberst	Leader of the 23. Panzer-Division	17 September 1944	Awarded (882nd) Oak Leaves 9 May 1945? (Note: Joseph von Radowitz nomination for the Oak Leaves was received by the Heerespersonalamt (HPA—Army Staff Office) from the troop on 30 April 1945 and approved by all intermittent commanding officers. Major Joachim Domaschk ruled that the nomination was insufficient and disapproved on 1 May and recommended "Decision by Chief of OKW". The file contains no indication whether this decision was ever taken. A teleprinter message was sent on 2 May to the nominating unit, the cavalry corps, and further messages to the commanding officers of the Panzer AOK 2 and Heeresgruppe Süd: "...was disapproved because ... the Führer criteria for the presentation guidelines have not been met. I.A. signed Maisel" The sequential number "882" was assigned by the Association of Knight's Cross Recipients (AKCR), the presentation date by Walther-Peer Fellgiebel.)	—
Eduard Radowski	Heer	Oberstleutnant	Commander of Panzer-Jäger-Abteilung 53	20 August 1942	—	—
Werner Radtke	Luftwaffe	Oberleutnant	Chief of the 1./Flak-Sturm-Regiment 35 (motorized)	28 April 1945	—	—
Günther Radusch+	Luftwaffe	Major	Gruppenkommandeur of the II./Nachtjagdgeschwader 3	29 August 1943	Awarded 444th Oak Leaves 6 April 1944	—
Oskar Radwan	Heer	Oberstleutnant	Commander of the II./Infanterie-Regiment 93	19 July 1940	—	—
Georg Radziej? (Note: Georg Radziej's teleprinter nomination, without the compulsory reasoning, by the troop was received by the at the time relocating 1st echelon of the Heerespersonalamt (HPA—Army Staff Office) on 20 April 1945. More detail regarding the nomination was promised in the teleprinter message which was never sent or was lost. Radziej was not listed in the nomination book nor was a file card created. A presentation cannot be verified According to the Association of Knight's Cross Recipients (AKCR) the award was presented in accordance with the Dönitz-decree. This is illegal according to the Deutsche Dienststelle (WASt) and lacks legal justification. The presentation date was assigned by Walther-Peer Fellgiebel.)	Heer	Generalleutnant	Commander of the 169. Infanterie-Division	9 May 1945	—	—
Dr. phil. h.c. Erich Raeder	Kriegsmarine	Großadmiral	Commander-in-chief of the Kriegsmarine	30 September 1939	—	A man wearing a military naval uniform and peaked cap holding a baton.
[Dr.] Kurt Raeder (Note: The brackets around the doctor title [Dr.] denotes that the academic title was attained after the Knight's Cross of the Iron Cross was awarded.)	Heer	Oberleutnant of the Reserves	Leader of the I./Grenadier-Regiment "Feldherrnhalle" (motorized)	21 January 1945	—	—
Adolf Raegener+	Heer	Oberstleutnant	Commander of Infanterie-Regiment 309	25 June 1940	Awarded 842nd Oak Leaves 17 April 1945	—
Horst Rämsch	Heer	Major	Commander of the II./Füsilier-Regiment 27 (Note: According to Scherzer as commander of the II./Panzer-Regiment 3.)	24 December 1944	—	—
Fritz Rätzel	Heer	Hauptmann of the Reserves	Chief of the 7./Schützen-Regiment 86	11 October 1941	—	—
[Dr.] Heinz Rafoth	Heer	Leutnant	Leader of the 2./Grenadier-Regiment 48	20 April 1945	—	—
Robert Rahlenbeck	Heer	Gefreiter	Richtschütze (gunner) in the 16./Jäger-Regiment 38	23 August 1943	—	—
Gerhard Raht+	Luftwaffe	Hauptmann	Staffelkapitän of the 1./Nachtjagdgeschwader 2 (Note: According to Scherzer as Staffelkapitän of the 4./Nachtjagdgeschwader 3.)	24 June 1944	Awarded 833rd Oak Leaves 15 April 1945	—
Heribert Raithel	Heer	Hauptmann	Commander of the II./Gebirgs-Artillerie-Regiment 95	13 June 1941	—	—
Dipl.-Ing. Johann Raithel	Luftwaffe	Oberst	Geschwaderkommodore of Kampfgeschwader 77	17 October 1941	—	—
Andreas von Rakowitz	Heer	Leutnant	Assault gun leader in Feldersatz-Bataillon 4 (L) (Note: According to Scherzer in Feldersatz-Bataillon 4 (L).)	24 June 1944	—	—
Carl Rall	Heer	Oberleutnant	Chief of the 11./Gebirgsjäger-Regiment 98	30 January 1943	—	—
Günther Rall+	Luftwaffe	Oberleutnant	Staffelkapitän of the 8./Jagdgeschwader 52 (Note: According to Scherzer on 4 September 1942 as pilot in the III./Jagdgeschwader 52.)	3 September 1942	Awarded 134th Oak Leaves 26 October 1942; 34th Swords 12 September 1943	The head of a young man, shown in semi-profile. He wears a military uniform with a military decoration in shape of an iron cross displayed at the front of his shirt collar. His hair is dark and short and combed to back, his nose is long and straight, he is smiling broadly and looking to the left of the camera.
Dr.-Ing. Viktor Rall	Kriegsmarine	Korvettenkapitän of the Reserves	Chief of the 15. Vorpostenflottille	10 June 1944	—	—
Günther Rambow	Heer	Hauptmann (Note: According to Scherzer as Hauptmann of the Reserves.)	Leader of the I./Grenadier-Regiment 1141	23 March 1945	—	—
Richard Rambow	Heer	Unteroffizier	Gun leader of the 1./Panzer-Jäger-Abteilung 561	19 September 1942	—	—
Hermann-Bernhard Ramcke+	Luftwaffe	Oberst (Note: According to Scherzer as Generalmajor and commander of the Ergänzenden Einheiten und Schulen des XI. Fliegerkorps (auxiliary units and schools of the 11th Air Corps) and leader of the Luftlande-Sturm-Regiment 1.)	Commander of Fallschirmjäger-Sturm-Regiment	21 August 1941	Awarded 145th Oak Leaves 13 November 1942; 99th Swords 19 September 1944; 20th Diamonds 19 September 1944	Upper body of a man wearing a military uniform with an Iron Cross displayed at the front of his uniform collar.
Hans-Georg von Ramin	Heer	Hauptmann of the Reserves	Commander of Panzer-Jäger-Abteilung 53	23 October 1944	—	—
Karl Rammelt	Luftwaffe	Major	Gruppenkommandeur of the II./Jagdgeschwader 51 "Mölders"	20 October 1944 (Note: According to Scherzer on 24 October 1944.)	—	—
Siegfried Rammelt	Luftwaffe	Leutnant	Pioneer Zugführer (platoon leader) in the Stabskompanie/Fallschirmjäger-Regiment 3 (Note: According to Scherzer on 11 June 1944 as leader of the regimental pioneer platoon in Fallschirmjäger-Regiment 3.)	9 June 1944*	Killed in action 21 March 1944	—
Josef Rampel	Heer	Oberfeldwebel	Demi Zugführer (platoon leader) in the 11./Panzer-Regiment "Großdeutschland"	14 December 1943*	Killed in action 17 November 1943 (Note: According to Scherzer he was killed in action on 16 November 1943.)	—
Alois Rampf	Heer	Oberleutnant of the Reserves	Leader of the 3./Pionier-Bataillon 88	4 October 1944	—	—
Günther Ramser	Heer	Oberstleutnant	Commander of Grenadier-Regiment 2	8 February 1944	—	
Werner Ranck	Heer	Generalmajor	Commander of the 121. Infanterie-Division	2 March 1945	—	—
[Dr.] Rolf Rannersmann	Luftwaffe	Hauptmann	Gruppenkommandeur of the I./Kampfgeschwader 4 "General Wever"	12 March 1945	—	—
Hans-Friedrich Graf zu Rantzau	Heer	Hauptmann	Leader of the II./Panzer-Artillerie-Regiment "Großdeutschland" (Note: According to Scherzer as leader of the II.(self-motorized)/Panzer-Artillerie-Regiment "Großdeutschland".)	9 June 1944	—	—
Heino von Rantzau	Luftwaffe	Generalleutnant	Commander of the 2. Flak-Division (motorized) (Note: According to Scherzer as commander of the 2. Flak-Division.)	29 August 1943	—	—
Fritz-Georg von Rappard+	Heer	Generalleutnant	Commander of the 7. Infanterie-Division	20 October 1944	Awarded 751st Oak Leaves 24 February 1945	—
August Rappel	Heer	Oberfähnrich	Zugführer (platoon leader) in the 14./Gebirgsjäger-Regiment 100	29 November 1944	—	—
Walter Rappholz	Heer	Oberfeldwebel	Zugführer (platoon leader) in Panzer-Jäger-Abteilung 616 (self-motorized)	3 November 1944	—	—
[Dr.] Ernst-Wilhelm Rapräger	Luftwaffe	Oberleutnant	Kampfgruppen leader in Luftwaffen-Regiment "Barenthin" (Note: According to Scherzer as leader of a Kampfgruppe in the III./Luftwaffen-Regiment "Barenthin".)	10 May 1943	—	—
Hermann Rasch	Kriegsmarine	Kapitänleutnant	Commander of U-106	29 December 1942	—	—
Siegfried Rasp	Heer	Generalmajor	Commander of the 335. Infanterie-Division	15 April 1944	—	—
Friedrich Rass	Heer	Hauptmann	Commander of the I./Panzergrenadier-Regiment 11	30 November 1943	—	—
Johann Rast	Heer	Oberleutnant	Company chief in Gebirgs-Pionier-Bataillon 85 (Note: According to Scherzer as chief of the 2./Gebirgs-Pionier-Bataillon 85.)	14 May 1941	—	—
Edmund Ratajczak	Heer	Oberfeldwebel	Zugführer (platoon leader) in the 1./schwere Panzer-Abteilung 507	10 February 1945	—	—
Alexander Ratcliffe	Heer	Oberst	Commander of Infanterie-Regiment 192	22 December 1941	—	—
Ernst Rath	Heer	Hauptmann	Commander of the II./Grenadier-Regiment 577	15 July 1944	—	—
Hans-Joachim Rath	Luftwaffe	Oberst	Geschwaderkommodore of Kampfgeschwader 4 "General Wever"	9 May 1942	—	—
Wilhelm Ratzke	Heer	Hauptmann	Commander of the I./Grenadier-Regiment 871	3 November 1944	—	—
Alfred Rauch	Luftwaffe	Fahnenjunker-Oberfeldwebel	Pilot in the Stabsstaffel/Jagdgeschwader 51 "Mölders"	28 April 1945	—	—
Erwin Rauch	Heer	Generalmajor	Commander of the 123. Infanterie-Division	22 December 1941	—	—
Hans Rauch	Luftwaffe	Oberst	Commander of Flak-Sturm-Regiment 41 (motorized) (Note: According to Scherzer as commander of Flak-Regiment (motorized) 41.)	6 December 1944	—	—
Josef Rauch	Heer	Oberst	Commander of Panzergrenadier-Regiment 192	8 August 1944	—	The head of a man, shown in semi-profile. He wears a military uniform with a military decoration in shape of an iron cross displayed at the front of his shirt collar. His hair is combed to back.
Karl-Heinz Rauch	Heer	Oberleutnant (Note: According to Scherzer as Oberleutnant of the Reserves and squadron chief in Divisions-Füsilier-Bataillon (A.A.) 256.)	Squadron chief in Divisions-Füsilier-Bataillon 256	15 March 1944	—	—
Franz-Xaver Raucheisen	Heer	Major	Commander of the I./Infanterie-Regiment 131	5 August 1940	—	—
Karl Rauer	Luftwaffe	Major	Gruppenkommandeur of the I./Kampfgeschwader 53 "Legion Condor"	29 February 1944	—	—
Paul-Hubert Rauh	Luftwaffe	Hauptmann (Note: According to Scherzer as Major.)	Gruppenkommandeur of the II./Nachtjagdgeschwader 4	28 April 1945	—	—
Erhard Raus+	Heer	Oberst	Commander of the 6. Schützen-Brigade	11 October 1941	Awarded 280th Oak Leaves 22 August 1943	—
Werner Rausch	Heer	Gefreiter	Gun leader in the 3./Panzer-Jäger-Abteilung 294	26 March 1943	—	—
Hermann Rauschenbusch	Heer	Major	Commander of the II./Jäger-Regiment 83	26 March 1943	—	—
Johann von Ravenstein	Heer	Oberst	Commander of Schützen-Regiment 4	3 June 1940	—	
Alfons Rebane+	Heer	Major	Commander of estn. Freiwilligen-Bataillon 658 (Note: According to Scherzer as commander of the Ost-Bataillon (estn.) 658 in the Kampfgruppe Speth (28. Jäger-Division).)	23 February 1944	Awarded (875th) Oak Leaves 9 May 1945? (Note: Alfons Rebane received the Knight's Cross of the Iron Cross on 23 February 1944 as Major and commander of the estnisches Freiwilligen-Bataillon 658 in the 28. Jäger-Division, at the time a Wehrmacht division and not part of the Waffen-SS. His nomination of the Oak Leaves was submitted to the Heerespersonalamt (HPA—Army Staff Office) on 12 April 1945. The German Federal Archives only hold a copy of the nomination. There is no indication or remark that the nomination was processed. The nomination list for the higher grade of the Knight's Cross with Oak Leaves dates the nomination on 2 April 1945. This list also gives no indication that the nomination had been processed. The Order Commission of the Association of Knight's Cross Recipients (AKCR) processed this case in 1974 and decided: 875th Oak Leaves on 8 May 1945. The sequential number "875" was assigned by the AKCR, the date was later changed by Fellgiebel to 9 May 1945. Rebane was member of the AKCR.)	
Gustav-Peter Reber? (Note: No evidence of the award can be found in the German Federal Archives. According to Krätschmer (letter to Von Seemen dated 7 August 1980) the award was presented together with the Oak Leaves to Matthias Kleinheisterkamp. Presumably the announcement was made via radio transmission on 28 April 1945 from the Führer Headquarters in Berlin to the 9. Armee (9th Army) in the Halbe pocket. The radio transmissions received by the AOK 9 (Armeeoberkommando 9 — high command of the 9th army) in April 1945 were not retained. All communication to the Führerbunker in Berlin were out of order as of 5AM on 28 April. The order commission of the Association of Knight's Cross Recipients (AKCR) processed the case in 1981 and decided: "Knight's Cross yes, 28 April 1945", Gustav-Peter Reber was a member of the AKCR.)	Waffen-SS	SS-Obersturmführer	Commander of the staff quarter of the XI. SS-Panzerkorps and leader of a Kampfgruppe in the Halbe Pocket	28 April 1945	—	—
Willy Reber	Heer	Oberleutnant of the Reserves	Adjutant in the III./Grenadier-Regiment 30 (motorized)	4 May 1944	—	—
Robert Rebholz	Luftwaffe	Hauptmann	Leader of Panzer-Aufklärungs-Abteilung "Hermann Göring"	2 August 1943	—	—
Erich Rech	Waffen-SS	SS-Oberscharführer	Zugführer (platoon leader) in the 2./SS-Panzer-Aufklärungs-Abteilung 10 "Frundsberg" (Note: According to Scherzer as Zugführer (platoon leader) in the 2./SS-Panzer-Aufklärungs-Abteilung 10.)	23 August 1944	—	—
Reinhart Reche	Kriegsmarine	Kapitänleutnant	Commander of U-255	17 March 1943	—	—
Curt Rechel	Kriegsmarine	Fregattenkapitän	Commander of Zerstörer Z-29	8 May 1943	—	—
Heinrich Recke	Heer	Generalleutnant	Commander of the 161. Infanterie-Division	4 September 1943	—	—
Hermann Recknagel+	Heer	Oberst	Commander of Infanterie-Regiment 54	5 August 1940	Awarded 319th Oak Leaves 6 November 1943; 104th Swords 23 October 1944	—
Wolf Recktenwald (Note: Later named Recktenwald-Wendel.)	Heer	Oberleutnant of the Reserves	Chief of Radfahr-Schwadron 255	24 May 1943	—	—
Edzard von Reden	Heer	Hauptmann of the Reserves	Commander of Panzer-Pionier-Bataillon 89	12 August 1944	—	—
Engelhard Reder	Heer	Unteroffizier	Gun leader in the 1./Panzer-Jäger-Abteilung 173	9 June 1944	—	—
Walter Reder	Waffen-SS	SS-Hauptsturmführer	Commander of the I./SS-Panzergrenadier-Regiment 1 SS-Division "Totenkopf" (Note: According to Scherzer as commander of the I./SS-Panzergrenadier-Regiment 1 "Totenkopf".)	3 April 1943	—	
Ernst Redlich	Heer	Hauptmann of the Reserves	Leader of the 2./Pionier-Bataillon 134 (Note: According to Scherzer as leader of the 1./Pionier-Bataillon 134.)	17 December 1943	—	—
Karl-Wolfgang Redlich	Luftwaffe	Oberleutnant	Staffelkapitän of the 1./Jagdgeschwader 27	9 July 1941	—	—
Adolf Reeb	Waffen-SS	SS-Untersturmführer	Zugführer (platoon leader) in the 7./SS-Panzer-Regiment 2 "Das Reich" (Note: According to Scherzer as Zugführer (platoon leader) in the 7./SS-Panzer-Regiment 2.)	23 August 1944	—	A man wearing a military uniform, side cap and neck order in the shape of a cross. His cap has an emblem in shape of a human skull and crossed bones.
Deert Reeder	Heer	Major of the Reserves	Commander of the II./Grenadier-Regiment 254	30 November 1943	—	—
Alfred Regeniter	Heer	Leutnant of the Reserves	Leader of the 3./Sturmgeschütz-Brigade 276	5 April 1945	—	—
Max Rehbein	Heer	Hauptmann of the Reserves	Commander of Pionier-Bataillon 23	5 March 1945	—	—
Siegfried Rehle	Luftwaffe	Oberleutnant	Observer in the 2./Kampfgeschwader 53 "Legion Condor"	19 February 1943*	Killed in action 30 December 1942	—
Erich Rehm	Heer	Hauptmann of the Reserves	Leader of Panzer-Jäger-Kompanie 1156	18 February 1945	—	—
Ernst Rehm	Heer	Major	Commander of Panzer-Aufklärungs-Abteilung 14	16 November 1943	—	—
Hans Rehm	Kriegsmarine	Korvettenkapitän	Chief of the 2. Minensuchflottille	31 December 1941	—	—
Richard Rehmer	Heer	Hauptmann	Commander Füsilier-Bataillon 126 (Note: According to Scherzer as commander Divisions-Füsilier-Bataillon 126.)	28 March 1945*	Killed in action 25 February 1945	—
Konrad Rehnitz	Heer	Leutnant of the Reserves	Leader of the 2./Panzer-Jäger-Abteilung 27	12 August 1942	—	—
Johann Reich	Heer	Unteroffizier	Assault Zugführer (platoon leader) in the 6./Grenadier-Regiment 411	14 April 1945	—	—
Johann Reich	Heer	Oberstleutnant of the Reserves	Commander of Panzergrenadier-Regiment 10	29 November 1944	—	—
Werner Reich	Heer	Oberleutnant	Chief of the 3./Pionier-Bataillon 5 (motorized)	18 April 1943	—	—
Werner Reich	Heer	Oberst (Note: According to Scherzer as Oberstleutnant.)	Commander of Grenadier-Regiment 274	29 February 1944*	Killed in action 25 January 1944	—
Hans Reichardt+	Heer	Major	Commander of the III./Infanterie-Regiment 192	24 July 1941	Awarded 762nd Oak Leaves 5 March 1945	—
Werner Reiche	Heer	Hauptmann of the Reserves	Commander of the I./Grenadier-Regiment 434	14 January 1945	—	—
Erwin Reichel	Waffen-SS	SS-Sturmbannführer	Leader of SS-Panzergrenadier-Regiment "Westland"	28 February 1943	—	—
Helmut Reichel	Heer	Major	Commander of the II./Füsilier-Regiment 26	6 April 1944	—	—
Martin Reichelt	Heer	Hauptmann of the Reserves	Commander of the I./Grenadier-Regiment 529	4 May 1944	—	—
Paul Reichelt	Heer	Generalmajor	Chief of the General Staff of Armee-Abteilung Narwa	8 October 1944	—	—
Walther von Reichenau	Heer	General der Artillerie	Commander-in-chief of the 10. Armee	30 September 1939	—	The upper body of a man, shown in semi-profile. He wears a military uniform, a peaked cap and a moocle in his right eye.
Josef Reichert	Heer	Generalleutnant	Commander of the 711. Infanterie-Division	9 December 1944	—	—
Karl Reichert	Heer	Oberfeldwebel	Zugführer (platoon leader) in the 1./Panzer-Zerstörer-Abteilung 156	13 November 1944 (Note: According to Scherzer on 3 November 1944.)	—	—
Rudolf Reichert	Heer	Generalmajor	Commander of the 292. Infanterie-Division	11 March 1945	—	—
Otto Reichhold (Note: According to Scherzer name is spelled Otto Reichold who received the Knight's Cross of the Iron Cross as leader of the regimental pioneer platoon of Grenadier-Regiment 448.)	Heer	Oberfeldwebel	Zugführer (platoon leader) in the Stabskompanie/Grenadier-Regiment 448	23 December 1943	—	—
Heinz Reichmann	Heer	Obergefreiter	Machine gunner in the 8./Jäger-Regiment 459 (L) of the 6. Luftwaffen-Feld-Division (Note: According to Scherzer as machine gunner in the 8./Jäger-Regiment 459 (L).)	20 January 1944	—	—
Gerhard Reichwald	Luftwaffe	Leutnant	Zugführer (platoon leader) in the 3./Flak-Regiment 12	1 August 1942	—	—
Egon Reifner	Heer	Oberleutnant	Chief of the 3./Panzer-Pionier-Bataillon 40	16 November 1944	—	—
Hans Reimann	Heer	Oberfeldwebel	Radio troop leader in the I./Grenadier-Regiment 358 (Note: According to Scherzer as radio troop leader in the Stab I./Grenadier-Regiment 358.)	17 March 1945*	Died of wounds 31 January 1945	—
Herbert Reimann	Heer	Feldwebel	Zugführer (platoon leader) in the 4.(MG)/Grenadier-Regiment 44 (Note: According to Scherzer as Zugführer (platoon leader) in the 4./Grenadier-Regiment 44.)	6 April 1944	—	—
Richard Reimann	Luftwaffe	Generalmajor	Commander of the 18. Flak-Division	3 April 1943	—	—
[Dr.] Wilhelm Reimann	Heer	Hauptmann of the Reserves	Commander of the II./Jäger-Regiment 724	26 December 1944	—	—
Gustav Reimar+	Heer	Hauptmann (Note: According to Scherzer as Oberleutnant.)	Chief of the 6./Panzergrenadier-Regiment 4	28 July 1943	Awarded 582nd Oak Leaves 10 September 1944	—
Hans Reimling	Waffen-SS	SS-Oberscharführer	Zugführer (platoon leader) in the 2./SS-Panzer-Regiment 1 "Leibstandarte SS Adolf Hitler" (Note: According to Scherzer as Zugführer (platoon leader) in the 2./SS-Panzer-Regiment "Leibstandarte SS Adolf Hitler".)	28 February 1943	—	A man wearing a military uniform, peaked cap and a neck order in the shape of a cross. His cap has an emblem in shape of a human skull and crossed bones.
Gerhard Reimpell	Heer	Oberstleutnant im Generalstab (in the General Staff)	Ia (operations officer) with the commander of Kowel (Note: According to Scherzer as Ia (operations officer)/Commander Fester Platz Kowel.)	9 July 1944	—	—
Siegfried Rein	Heer	Generalleutnant	Commander of the 69. Infanterie-Division	24 February 1945*	Killed in action 18 January 1945 (Note: According to Scherzer killed in action on 16 January 1945.)	—
Willi Rein	Luftwaffe	Oberfeldwebel	Pilot in the Stabsstaffel/Kampfgeschwader 53 "Legion Condor"	5 September 1944*	Killed in action 21 August 1944	—
Josef Reinardy	Luftwaffe	Leutnant	Pilot in the (Fern)Aufklärungs-Gruppe 3 (Note: According to Scherzer as pilot in the Stab/Fernaufklärungs-Gruppe 3.)	24 January 1945*	Killed in action 25 December 1944	—
Leander Reinbacher	Heer	Leutnant (Note: According to Scherzer as Leutnant of the Reserves.)	Leader of the 1./Grenadier-Regiment 81	30 April 1945	—	—
Rudi Reineck	Heer	Oberleutnant	Chief of the 8./Schützen-Regiment 6	20 March 1942*	Died of wounds 20 January 1942	—
Ewald Reinecke (Note: According to Scherzer name is spelled Ewald Reineke.)	Heer	Unteroffizier	Panzer commander in Sturmgeschütz-Abteilung 1122	18 November 1944	—	—
Gerhard Reinecke	Luftwaffe	Leutnant	Pilot in the 1.(F)/Aufklärungs-Gruppe 121 (Note: According to Scherzer as pilot in the Aufklärungsstaffel 1.(F)/121.)	23 December 1942	—	—
Heinz Reinefarth+	Heer	Feldwebel	Zugführer (platoon leader) in the 14.(Panzerjäger)/Infanterie-Regiment 337 (Note: According to Scherzer as Zugführer (platoon leader) in the 14./Infanterie-Regiment 337.)	25 June 1940	Awarded 608th Oak Leaves 30 September 1944	
Paul Reineking	Luftwaffe	Oberleutnant	Chief of the 3./Flak-Regiment 36 (motorized) (Note: According to Scherzer as chief of the 3./Flak-Regiment 36.)	26 March 1944	—	—
Ernst-Wilhelm Reinert+	Luftwaffe	Unteroffizier	Pilot in the 4./Jagdgeschwader 77	1 July 1942	Awarded 131st Oak Leaves 7 October 1942; 130th Swords 1 February 1945 (Note: According to Scherzer the Oak Leaves to the Knight's Cross were awarded on 5 October 1942.)	
Hans-Wolfgang Reinhard	Heer	General der Infanterie	Commanding general of the LI. Armeekorps	22 September 1941	—	—
Alfred-Hermann Reinhardt+	Heer	Oberstleutnant	Commander of Infanterie-Regiment 421	4 December 1941	Awarded 306th Oak Leaves 28 September 1943; 118th Swords 24 December 1944	
Arnold Reinhardt	Heer	Gefreiter	Group leader of the 7./Grenadier-Regiment 166	24 September 1943	—	—
Georg-Hans Reinhardt+	Heer	Generalleutnant	Commander in the 4. Panzer-Division	27 October 1939	Awarded 73rd Oak Leaves 17 February 1942; 68th Swords 26 May 1944	The head and torso of a man wearing a military uniform and overcoat; an Iron Cross is displayed at the front of his uniform collar.
Hans Reinhardt	Heer	Major	Commander of the I./Artillerie-Regiment 241	18 October 1941*	Died of wounds 4 September 1941	—
Walter Reinhardt	Heer	Oberstleutnant	Commander of Grenadier-Regiment 1141	18 November 1944	—	—
Wilhelm Reinhardt	Heer	Oberfeldwebel	Zugführer (platoon leader) in the 5./Infanterie-Regiment 518	22 February 1942	—	—
Heinz Reinhart	Heer	Oberleutnant of the Reserves	Chief of the 6./Grenadier-Regiment 109	17 August 1943	—	—
Karl Reinhart	Heer	Leutnant of the Reserves	Leader of the 7./Sturm-Regiment 215	20 December 1943	—	—
Leo-Hermann Reinhold	Waffen-SS	SS-Sturmbannführer	Commander of the II./SS-Panzer-Regiment 10 "Frundsberg" (Note: According to Scherzer as commander of the II./SS-Panzer-Regiment 10.)	16 October 1944	—	—
Voldemars Reinholds? (Note: Voldemars Reinholds' nomination by the troop was received by Heerespersonalamt (HPA—Army Staff Office) on 25 March 1945. The HPA created a nomination numbered 4940 on 30 March 1945. A file card listing the same information is filed among the rejected nominations. The column verliehen (Awarded) in the book "Verliehene Ritterkreuze" (Awarded Knight Crosses) is blank. No proof exists that the Knight's Cross was awarded. The presentation date was assigned by the Association of Knight's Cross Recipients (AKCR).)	Waffen-SS	Waffen-Sturmbannführer	Commander of Waffen-Grenadier-Regiment of the SS	11 May 1945	—	—
Gerhard Reinicke	Heer	Feldwebel	Group leader in the 2./Panzer-Regiment 6 (Note: According to Scherzer in the 2./Panzer-Regiment 6 [not a group leader].)	9 July 1941	—	—
Hansjürgen Reinicke	Kriegsmarine	Kapitän zur See	Commander of heavy cruiser Prinz Eugen	21 April 1945	—	
Adolf Reininghaus	Luftwaffe	Oberfeldwebel	Zugführer (platoon leader) in the 14./Fallschirmjäger-Regiment 7	13 September 1944	—	—
Friedrich-Wilhelm Reinke	Luftwaffe	Major	Commander of the I./Flak-Regiment 9 "Legion Condor" (Note: According to Scherzer for service in the Battle of Stalingrad.)	9 October 1943	—	—
Heinrich Reinke	Heer	Oberfeldwebel	Zugführer (platoon leader) in the 14.(Panzerjäger)/Infanterie-Regiment 89 (Note: According to Scherzer as Zugführer (platoon leader) in the 14./Infanterie-Regiment 89.)	9 January 1942	—	—
Fritz Reinkober	Heer	Oberst (Note: According to Scherzer as Oberst of the Reserves and commander of Regiment "Reinkober"/Division Stab z.b.V. 609 (fortress Breslau).)	Commander of Festungsgrenadier-Regiment "Reinkober" in the fortress Breslau	30 April 1945	—	—
Heinz Reintjes	Heer	Oberleutnant of the Reserves	Leader of Panzergrenadier-Bataillon 2102 (Note: According to Scherzer as leader of Panzergrenadier-Bataillon 2101.)	18 November 1944	—	—
Max Reinwald+	Heer	Oberstleutnant of the Reserves	Commander of Grenadier-Regiment 19	29 February 1944	Awarded 702nd Oak Leaves 18 January 1945	—
Otto Reinwald	Heer	Hauptmann	Commander of Feldersatz-Bataillon 212	9 April 1944	—	—
Sebastian Reiser	Heer	Gefreiter	Richtkanonier (gunner) in the 1./Artillerie-Regiment 297	11 October 1941	—	—
Josef Reisig	Heer	Oberfeldwebel	Zugführer (platoon leader) in the 11./Infanterie-Regiment 164	15 January 1942	—	—
Dr. theol. Walter Reissinger	Heer	Oberstleutnant	Commander of Grenadier-Regiment 215	17 December 1942	—	—
Paul Reißmann	Waffen-SS	SS-Oberscharführer	Deputy leader of the 4./SS-Kavallerie-Regiment 17 (Note: According to Scherzer as leader of the 4./SS-Kavallerie-Regiment 17.)	16 November 1944*	Died of wounds 8 November 1944	—
Werner Reißmann	Heer	Hauptmann	Leader of the III./Schützen-Regiment 104	28 July 1942	—	—
Hans Reiter	Waffen-SS	SS-Untersturmführer	Leader of Stabskompanie/SS-Panzergrenadier-Regiment 21 "Frundsberg" (Note: According to Scherzer as leader of Stabskompanie/SS-Panzergrenadier-Regiment 21.)	23 August 1944*	Killed in action 15 August 1944	—
Otto Reittinger	Heer	Unteroffizier	Group leader in the 4./Panzer-Aufklärungs-Abteilung 2	23 October 1944*	Killed in action 8 August 1944	—
Hans Albin Freiherr von Reitzenstein	Waffen-SS	SS-Obersturmbannführer	Commander of SS-Panzer-Regiment 2 "Das Reich" (Note: According to Scherzer as commander of SS-Panzer-Regiment 2.)	13 November 1943	—	—
Josef Remberg	Luftwaffe	Oberleutnant	Pilot in the 2.(F)/Aufklärungs-Gruppe 11 (Note: According to Scherzer on 29 February 1944 as pilot in the Aufklärungsstaffel 2.(F)/11.)	25 February 1944	—	—
Otto-Ernst Remer+	Heer	Major	Commander of the I./Grenadier-Regiment "Großdeutschland" (Note: According to Scherzer as commander of the I./Grenadier-Regiment (motorized) "Großdeutschland".)	18 May 1943	Awarded 325th Oak Leaves 12 November 1943	Black-and-white portrait of a man in semi profile wearing a military uniform with various military decorations, his dark hair is parted and combed back.
Heinrich Remlinger	Heer	Oberst	Commander of Schneidemühl (Note: According to Scherzer as commander of fortress Schneidemühl.)	30 January 1945	—	—
Hans Remmer	Luftwaffe	Hauptmann	Staffelkapitän of the 1./Jagdgeschwader 27	9 June 1944*	Killed in action 2 April 1944	—
Heinz Remmert	Heer	Hauptmann	Deputy leader of the II./Grenadier-Regiment 464 (Note: According to Scherzer as leader of the II./Grenadier-Regiment 464.)	10 September 1944	—	—
Otto Rendl	Heer	Unteroffizier	Gun leader in the 14./Infanterie-Regiment 132	28 July 1942	—	—
Dr. jur. Lothar Rendulic+	Heer	Generalleutnant	Commander of the 52. Infanterie-Division	6 March 1942	Awarded 271st Oak Leaves 15 August 1943; 122nd Swords 18 January 1945	A black-and-white photograph of a man in semi profile wearing a military uniform, field cap, glasses and a neck order in shape of an Iron Cross.
Paul-Ernst Renisch	Luftwaffe	Hauptmann	Commander of the III./Fallschirmjäger-Regiment 1	31 October 1944	—	—
Rudolf Rennecke+	Luftwaffe	Hauptmann	Leader of the II./Fallschirmjäger-Regiment 3	9 June 1944	Awarded 664th Oak Leaves 25 November 1944	—
Wilhelm Renner	Heer	Oberleutnant	Chief of the 8./Schützen-Regiment 2	5 August 1940	—	—
Günther Rennhack	Heer	Hauptmann	Commander of Panzer-Jäger-Abteilung 1818	30 December 1944	—	—
Karl Renoldner	Heer	Oberleutnant of the Reserves (Note: According to Scherzer as Oberleutnant and killed in action on 16 August 1943.)	Leader of the 6./Grenadier-Regiment 462	10 September 1943*	Killed in action 17 August 1943	—
[Dr.] Helmut Renschler+	Heer	Oberleutnant of the Reserves	Chief of the 1./Artillerie-Regiment 5	15 May 1944	Awarded 770th Oak Leaves 11 March 1945	—
Ewert von Renteln	Heer	Oberstleutnant of the Reserves	Commander of Kosaken-Regiment 360 (Note: According to Scherzer as commander of (Kosaken) Festungs-Grenadier-Regiment 360.)	13 January 1945	—	—
Fritz Rentrop	Waffen-SS	SS-Obersturmführer	Chief of the 2./SS-Flak-Abteilung 2 "Reich" (Note: According to Scherzer as chief of the 2./SS-Flak-Abteilung SS-Division "Reich".)	13 October 1941	—	A man wearing a military uniform, side cap and neck order in the shape of a cross. His cap has an emblem in shape of a human skull and crossed bones.
Emil Rentschler	Heer	Hauptmann	Commander of the III./Grenadier-Regiment 537	18 October 1943	—	—
Gerhard Renz	Luftwaffe	Oberfeldwebel	Pilot in the II./Kampfgeschwader 26 (Note: According to Scherzer as pilot in the 1./Kampfgeschwader 26.)	31 July 1940	—	—
Gottlieb Renz	Waffen-SS	SS-Hauptsturmführer (Note: According to Scherzer as SS-Hauptsturmführer of the Reserves and commander of SS-Schützen-Bataillon 6.)	Commander of SS-Schützen-Bataillon (motorized) 6	12 August 1944	—	—
Joachim Renz	Luftwaffe	Hauptmann	Leader of the I./Fallschirm-Panzer-Regiment "Hermann Göring"	6 December 1944*	Killed in action 23 October 1944	—
Anton Resch	Luftwaffe	Oberleutnant	Staffelkapitän of the 3./Jagdgeschwader 52	7 April 1945	—	—
Rudolf Resch	Luftwaffe	Hauptmann	Staffelkapitän of the 5./Jagdgeschwader 52 (Note: According to Scherzer as Staffelkapitän of the 6./Jagdgeschwader 52.)	6 September 1942	—	—
Willi Reschke	Luftwaffe	Oberfeldwebel	Pilot in the Stab/Jagdgeschwader 301	20 April 1945	—	—
Ralph von Rettberg	Luftwaffe	Hauptmann	Gruppenkommandeur of the II./Zerstörergeschwader 26 "Horst Wessel"	14 June 1941	—	
Rudolf Rettberg? (Note: No evidence of the award can be found in the German Federal Archives. Presumably the award was presented by SS-Oberstgruppenführer Sepp Dietrich which would make it an unlawful presentation. The author was denied access to files, which could help clarify the case, of the Association of Knight's Cross Recipients (AKCR) on the grounds of the Bundesarchivgesetz (German Archive Law). The presentation date 6 May 1945 was assigned by Fellgiebel. Scherzer questions whether this was done to place Rudolf Rettberg among the Sepp Dietrich awards. Krätschmer and Von Seemen state the 1 May 1945.)	Waffen-SS	SS-Sturmbannführer	Commander of the II./SS-Panzer-Regiment 9 "Hohenstaufen"	6 May 1945	—	—
Josef Rettemeier+	Heer	Hauptmann	Commander of Panzer-Abteilung 5	5 December 1943	Awarded 425th Oak Leaves 13 March 1944	A man wearing a military uniform with an Iron Cross displayed at the front of his uniform collar.
Karl Rettlinger	Waffen-SS	SS-Hauptsturmführer (Note: According to Scherzer as SS-Hauptsturmführer of the Reserves and chief of the 3./SS-Sturmgeschütz-Abteilung 1.)	Chief of the 3./SS-Sturmgeschütz-Abteilung 1 "Leibstandarte SS Adolf Hitler"	20 December 1943	—	—
Karl Retzlaff	Heer	Oberfeldwebel	Leader of the 3./Grenadier-Regiment 4	30 September 1944	—	—
Ernst Reusch	Luftwaffe	Oberleutnant	Staffelkapitän of the 5./Sturzkampfgeschwader 1 (Note: According to Scherzer as Staffelkapitän of the 5./Sturzkampfgeschwader 2.)	3 November 1942	—	—
Franz Reuß	Luftwaffe	Generalmajor	Commander of the 4. Flieger-Division	18 July 1944	—	—
Richard-Heinrich von Reuß	Heer	Generalmajor	Commander of the 62. Infanterie-Division	24 January 1943*	Killed in action 22 December 1942	—
Rudi Reußner (Note: According to Scherzer his name is Rudolf Reußner who received the Knight's Cross of the Iron Cross as pilot in the III./Schlachtgeschwader 2 "Immelmann".)	Luftwaffe	Oberfeldwebel	Pilot in the 8./Schlachtgeschwader 2 "Immelmann"	29 February 1944	—	—
Alfred Reuter	Heer	Oberleutnant of the Reserves	Leader of the 2./Infanterie-Regiment 418	21 February 1943	—	—
August Reuter	Heer	Leutnant (Note: According to Scherzer as Leutnant of the Reserves.)	Zugführer (platoon leader) in the 2./Panzer-Jäger-Abteilung 219	15 May 1944	—	—
Benno Reuter+	Heer	Stabsfeldwebel	Leader of the 7./Jäger-Regiment 49	8 February 1944	Awarded 633rd Oak Leaves 28 October 1944	—
Derfflinger von Reuter	Heer	Oberstleutnant	Commander of Grenadier-Regiment 45	17 March 1945	—	—
Erich Reuter+	Heer	Oberstleutnant	Commander of Infanterie-Regiment 122	17 August 1942	Awarded 710th Oak Leaves 21 January 1945	
Erich Reuter	Heer	Hauptmann	Chief of the 3./schwere Panzer-Jäger-Abteilung 519	18 July 1944	—	—
Joachim Reuter	Heer	Oberst of the Reserves	Commander of Grenadier-Regiment 386	27 August 1944	—	—
Kurt Reuter	Heer	Obergefreiter	Group leader in the 6./Grenadier-Regiment 279	4 May 1944	—	—
Heinz Reverchon	Heer	Leutnant	Zugführer (platoon leader) in the 1./Kradschützen-Bataillon 43	16 September 1942	—	—
Helmuth Reymann+	Heer	Generalleutnant	Commander of the 13. Luftwaffen-Feld-Division (Note: According to Scherzer as commander of the 13. Feld-Division (L).)	5 April 1944	Awarded 672nd Oak Leaves 28 November 1944	
Ernst-Martin Rhein	Heer	Oberleutnant	Chief of the 5./Infanterie-Regiment 18	22 December 1941	—	—
Joseph Rhein	Heer	Hauptmann	Commander of the I./Grenadier-Regiment 530	23 February 1944	—	—
Karl Rhein	Heer	Oberst	Commander of Infanterie-Regiment 439	6 March 1942	—	The head of a man, shown in semi-profile. He wears a military uniform with a military decoration in shape of an iron cross displayed at the front of his shirt collar. His hair is dark and combed to back.
Rudolf von Ribbentrop	Waffen-SS	SS-Obersturmführer	Leader of the 6./SS-Panzer-Regiment 1 "Leibstandarte SS Adolf Hitler"	15 July 1943 (Note: According to Scherzer on 17 July 1943.)	—	—
Johann-Georg Richert+	Heer	Generalleutnant	Commander of the 35. Infanterie-Division	17 March 1944	Awarded 623rd Oak Leaves 18 October 1944	—
Bruno Richter+	Heer	Rittmeister	Leader of Divisions-Füsilier-Bataillon 24 (Note: According to Scherzer as leader of Divisions-Füsilier-Bataillon (A.A.) 24.)	26 November 1944	Awarded 825th Oak Leaves 8 April 1945	—
Emil Richter	Heer	Unteroffizier	Group leader in the 11./Infanterie-Regiment 401	25 August 1942	—	—
Franz Richter	Heer	Gefreiter	Machine gunner in the 1./Panzergrenadier-Regiment 114	14 May 1944	—	—
Friedrich Richter+	Heer	Major	Commander of the III./Grenadier-Regiment 42	17 August 1943	Awarded 818th Oak Leaves 5 April 1945	—
Friedrich Richter? (Note: The nomination by the troop via teleprinter message was sent on 25 March 1945, according to file card on 28 March 1945, according to the book "Verliehene Ritterkreuze" (Awarded Knight Crosses) on 5 April 1945. The nomination was returned to the HPA/P5a (Army personnel office) by SS-Obersturmbannführer Wilhelm Kment, the adjutant of Heinrich Himmler and liaison officer to the Heerespersonalamt (HPA—Army Staff Office), with the approval of Himmler on 29 April 1945. Retained by the German Federal Archives are four identical copies listing the approval of Friedrich Richter's divisional commander Heinz Harmel and the Reichsführer SS, as well as three almost finished nominations by the HPA. Missing is the confirmation of the commander-in-chief of the 9. Armee and Army Group Vistula. The nomination of the HPA Nr. 4729 is listed in the book "Verliehene Ritterkreuze" (Awarded Knight Crosses), however lacks reference to this number and remained unfinished by the end of the war. The order commission of the Association of Knight's Cross Recipients (AKCR) processed this case in 1977 and decided "Knight's Cross yes, 6 May 1945". Fellgiebel later changed this date again. Krätschmer lists the 9 May 1945. Richter was a member of the AKCR.)	Waffen-SS	SS-Sturmbannführer	Commander of the III./SS-Panzergrenadier-Regiment 21 "Frundsberg"	11 May 1945	—	—
Gerhard Richter	Luftwaffe	Oberleutnant	Staffelkapitän of the 9.(K)/Lehrgeschwader 1	24 November 1940	—	—
Hans Richter	Heer	Hauptmann	Leader of the I./Grenadier-Regiment 121	29 January 1944	—	—
Hans-Heinrich Richter	Luftwaffe	Hauptmann	Commander of Fallschirm-Panzer-Aufklärungs-Abteilung 2 (Note: According to Scherzer as commander of Fallschirm-Panzer-Aufklärungs-Abteilung 2 "Hermann Göring".)	26 March 1945	—	—
Heinz Richter	Luftwaffe	Hauptmann (Note: According to Scherzer as Major.)	Gruppenkommandeur of the III./Kampfgeschwader 77	19 September 1943*	Died of wounds 2 June 1943	—
Heinz Richter	Luftwaffe	Leutnant	Leader of the 4./Fallschirm-Pionier-Bataillon 5	12 March 1945	—	—
Joachim Richter	Waffen-SS	SS-Obersturmbannführer of the Reserves	Commander of the SS-Panzer-Artillerie-Regiment 5 "Wiking" (Note: According to Scherzer as commander of the SS-Panzer-Artillerie-Regiment 5.)	23 February 1944	—	—
Johannes Richter	Heer	Leutnant	Leader of the 2./Panzergrenadier-Regiment 304	30 September 1944	—	—
Johannes Richter	Luftwaffe	Oberfeldwebel	Radio/wireless operator in the Stab Nachtjagdgruppe 10	30 September 1944	—	—
Kurt Richter	Heer	Fahnenjunker-Oberfeldwebel	Aide-de-camp in the Stab II./Grenadier-Regiment 31	28 March 1945	—	—
Richard Richter	Heer	Oberfeldwebel	Zugführer (platoon leader) in the 7./Panzergrenadier-Regiment 33	7 January 1944	—	—
Rudolf Richter	Heer	Major of the Reserves	Leader of Infanterie-Regiment 97	7 August 1942	—	—
Rudolf Richter	Luftwaffe	Oberfeldwebel	Pilot and observer in the 3.(H)/Aufklärungs-Gruppe 12 (Note: According to Scherzer on 24 January 1945 as pilot and observer in the Nahaufklärungsstaffel 13(H)/14.)	14 January 1945	—	—
Walther Richter	Luftwaffe	Oberfeldwebel	Board/flight mechanic in the 5./Kampfgeschwader 53 "Legion Condor"	28 February 1945	—	—
Werner Richter	Heer	Generalleutnant	Commander of the 263. Infanterie-Division	7 February 1944	—	—
Wilfried Richter	Waffen-SS	SS-Obersturmführer	Leader of SS-Sturmgeschütz-Batterie/SS-"Totenkopf"-Division	21 April 1942	—	—
Dipl.-Ing. Wolfram Freiherr von Richthofen+	Luftwaffe	Generalmajor	Commanding general of the VIII. Fliegerkorps	17 May 1940 (Note: According to Scherzer on 18 May 1940.)	Awarded 26th Oak Leaves 17 July 1941	The head and shoulders of a man, shown in semi-profile. He wears a peaked cap and a military uniform with an Eagle above his right breast pocket, and an Iron Cross displayed at the front of his white shirt collar.
Kurt Rick	Luftwaffe	Hauptmann (Note: According to Scherzer as Oberleutnant.)	Staffelkapitän of the 2./Sturzkampfgeschwader 77	3 April 1943*	Killed in action 5 January 1943	—
Hans-Oskar Rickert	Heer	Hauptmann	Commander of the I./Artillerie-Regiment 320	30 December 1943	—	—
Josef Rickert	Heer	Obergefreiter	Group leader in the 1./Panzergrenadier-Regiment 12	20 October 1944	—	—
Boy Rickmers	Heer	Oberstleutnant	Leader of Grenadier-Regiment 586	26 March 1943	—	—
Klaus Riebicke	Luftwaffe	Feldwebel	Pilot in the 9./Schlachtgeschwader 10	6 October 1944*	Killed in action 6 June 1944	—
Karl Riechers	Heer	Oberfeldwebel	Company leader in the I./Panzergrenadier-Regiment 2	8 August 1943	—	—
Hans-Georg Riechert	Heer	Leutnant (Note: According to Scherzer as Leutnant of the Reserves.)	Leader of the 5./Infanterie-Regiment 311	9 January 1942	—	—
Herbert Rieckhoff	Luftwaffe	Oberst	Geschwaderkommodore of Kampfgeschwader 2	5 July 1941	—	—
Franz Riedel	Waffen-SS	SS-Obersturmführer	Chief of the 7./SS-Panzer-Regiment 10 "Frundsberg" (Note: According to Scherzer as chief of the 7./SS-Panzer-Regiment 10.)	28 March 1945	—	—
Gerd Riedel? (Note: Gerd Riedel's Knight's Cross nomination was submitted by the troop via teleprinter message on 6 March 1945. A stamp indicated an entry date of 8 March 1945. The written nomination was sent on 24 March and was received by the Heerespersonalamt (HPA—Army Staff Office) on 28 April. A day later Major Joachim Domaschk processed this request and noted: "By no means sufficient for the Knight's Cross!" General Ernst Maisel disapproved the nomination on 30 April—he had been authorized to do so at this time. The troop was probably not informed of this decision. The IIa (Adjutant) of commander-in-chief North had entered Riedel's "pending" nomination on a list for approval by Großadmiral Karl Dönitz shortly before the German surrender. In parallel the HPA was informed and Oberst Goecke created an Heerespersonalamt-Außenstelle-Verleihungsvorschlag (HPA/A-VV—Branch of the Army Staff Office Nomination Recommendation). He had approved the nomination and backdated the nomination to 28 April. Neither the list nor the recommendation was signed. A presentation was never made and a legally binding disapproval was made by General Maisel. The presentation date was assigned by the Association of Knight's Cross Recipients (AKCR). Riedel was a member of the AKCR.)	Luftwaffe	Oberst im Generalstab (in the General Staff)	Leader of Fallschirmjäger-Regiment 7	8 May 1945	—	—
Walter Riedel	Heer	Leutnant of the Reserves	Aide-de-camp in the regimental stab of Panzergrenadier-Regiment 73 (Note: According to Scherzer as leader of the 3./Panzergrenadier-Regiment 73.)	14 April 1943	—	—
Willy Riedel+	Heer	Hauptmann	Commander of the III./Infanterie-Regiment 524	8 October 1942 (Note: According to Scherzer on 8 December 1942.)	Awarded 186th Oak Leaves 25 January 1943	Black-and-white portrait of a man with a military uniform, side cap and an Iron Cross displayed at his neck.
Volprecht Riedesel Freiherr zu Eisenbach+	Luftwaffe	Hauptmann	Gruppenkommandeur of the II./Kampfgeschwader 76	7 October 1942	Awarded 696th Oak Leaves 14 January 1945	—
Adam Riedmüller	Heer	Feldwebel	Zugführer (platoon leader) in the 4./Jagd-Panzer-Abteilung II (Panzergrenadier-Division "Kurmark") (Note: According to Scherzer on 18 February 1945 as latoon leader in the 4./Jagd-Panzer-Abteilung 2 [Panzer-Jäger-Brigade 104].)	8 February 1945	—	—
Waldemar Riefkogel	Waffen-SS	SS-Obersturmführer	Leader of the 1./SS-Panzer-Regiment 3 "Totenkopf" (Note: According to Scherzer as leader of the 1./SS-Panzer-Regiment 3.)	11 July 1943	—	—
Fritz Rieflin? (Note: No evidence regarding the presentation of the Knight's Cross of the Iron Cross to Fritz Rieflin can be found in the German Federal Archives. Walther-Peer Fellgiebel also had no evidence and wrote on 11 July 1983 to Mr. Eichhorn: "I have to rely on Krätschmer in Rieflin's case...". Unlawful presentation by SS-Oberstgruppenführer Sepp Dietrich. The date is taken from the announcement made by the 6. SS-Panzerarmee. Rieflin was a member of the Association of Knight's Cross Recipients (AKCR).)	Waffen-SS	SS-Obersturmführer	Chief of the 2./SS-Panzer-Pionier-Bataillon 2 "Das Reich"	6 May 1945	—	—
Kurt Riegel	Luftwaffe	Hauptmann	Staffelkapitän of the 5./Schlachtgeschwader 3 (Note: According to Scherzer as Staffelkapitän in the II./Schlachtgeschwader 3.)	8 August 1944*	Killed in action 1 July 1944	—
Joachim Rieger	Luftwaffe	Oberleutnant	Staffelkapitän of the 5./Sturzkampfgeschwader 1	19 March 1942*	Killed in action 2 December 1941	—
Johann Rieger	Heer	Obergefreiter	Company messenger in the 1./Panzergrenadier-Regiment 59 (Note: According to Scherzer as messenger in the I./Panzergrenadier-Regiment 59.)	26 March 1944	—	—
Karl Rieger	Heer	Hauptmann	Commander of the I./Grenadier-Regiment 2 "Scharnhorst"	28 April 1945	—	—
Otto Riehs (Note: According to Walther-Peer Fellgiebel name is spelled Otto Rieß.)	Heer	Obergefreiter	Gun leader in the 14./Grenadier-Regiment 55	11 October 1943	—	A color photograph of a man holding a speech standing behind a lecturn. He wears a jacket and white shirt with a military decoration in shape of an iron cross displayed at the front of his shirt collar.
Alfreds Riekstinš	Waffen-SS	Waffen-Unterscharführer	Zugführer (platoon leader) in the 1./Waffen-Füsilier-Bataillon 19 of the SS	5 April 1945	—	—
Hermann Rienäcker	Heer	Leutnant of the Reserves	Leader of 4./Heeres-Flak-Artillerie-Abteilung 272	29 February 1944* (Note: According to Scherzer on 17 March 1945.)	Killed in action 15 March 1945	—
Julius Riepe	Waffen-SS	SS-Sturmbannführer	Leader of the I./SS-Panzergrenadier-Regiment 40 "Horst Wessel" (Note: According to Scherzer as leader of the I./SS-Panzergrenadier-Regiment 40.)	13 January 1945	—	—
Josef-Otto Riepold	Heer	Oberleutnant	Chief of the 5./Panzer-Regiment 5 in the DAK (Note: According to Scherzer as chief of the 5./Panzer-Regiment 5.)	29 July 1942*	Killed in action 17 June 1942	—
Karl Riesle (Note: According to Scherzer name is spelled Karl Rihsle.)	Heer	Oberjäger	Rifle leader in the 14./Gebirgsjäger-Regiment 85	29 February 1944	—	—
Karl Rieß	Heer	Hauptmann	Leader of the 7./Grenadier-Regiment 282	27 August 1943	—	—
Herbert-Albert Rieth	Waffen-SS	SS-Untersturmführer of the Reserves	Leader of the 5./Freiwilligen SS-Artillerie-Regiment 54 "Nederland" (Note: According to Scherzer as leader of the 5./SS-Artillerie-Regiment 54.)	11 December 1944	—	—
Georg Rietscher+	Heer	Gefreiter	Richtschütze (gunner) in the 14.(Panzerjäger)/Infanterie-Regiment 513 (Note: According to Scherzer as Richtschütze (gunner) in the 14./Infanterie-Regiment 513.)	27 June 1942	Awarded 210th Oak Leaves 14 March 1943	—
Harald Riipalu	Waffen-SS	Waffen-Obersturmbannführer	Commander of SS-Freiwilligen-Grenadier-Regiment 45 (Note: According to Scherzer as commander of Waffen-Grenadier-Regiment der SS 45 (estn. Nr. 1).)	23 August 1944	—	—
Bernhard Rindfleisch	Heer	Oberfeldwebel	Zugführer (platoon leader) in the 6./Grenadier-Regiment 575	12 August 1944	—	—
Erich Ring	Heer	Hauptmann	Commander of the II./Infanterie-Regiment 84	21 September 1941	—	—
Julius Ringel+	Heer	Generalmajor	Commander of the 5. Gebirgs-Division	13 June 1941	Awarded 312th Oak Leaves 25 October 1943	The head of a man with beard, shown in semi-profile. He wears a military uniform with a military decoration in shape of an iron cross displayed at the front of his shirt collar. His hair is dark and combed to back.
Jakob Ringhof	Heer	Hauptmann	Commander of Divisions-Füsilier-Bataillon 215	23 December 1943	—	—
Helmut Ringler	Luftwaffe	Leutnant (Note: According to Scherzer as Leutnant of the Reserves.)	Heavy machine gun demi Zugführer (platoon leader) in the Sturmgruppe "Stahl" in the Fallschirm-Sturm-Abteilung "Koch"	15 May 1940	—	—
Adolf Rinke	Heer	Leutnant (Note: According to Scherzer as Oberleutnant of the Reserves, killed in action on 15 April 1945.)	Leader of the 2./schwere Panzer-Abteilung 502	17 April 1945*	Killed in action 13 April 1945	—
Karl-Eberhard Rinke	Heer	Oberleutnant	Chief of the 8./Grenadier-Regiment 552	22 April 1943	—	—
Leo Rinkowski	Heer	Gefreiter	Machine gunner in the 5./Grenadier-Regiment 670	21 September 1944	—	—
Josef Rintelen	Heer	Oberstleutnant	Commander of the I./Infanterie-Regiment 478	5 August 1940	—	—
Werner Ripcke	Heer	Hauptmann of the Reserves	Commander of the I./Grenadier-Regiment 89	18 December 1944	—	—
Eberhard Risse	Heer	Hauptmann	Adjutant in Panzergrenadier-Regiment 60	26 November 1944	—	—
Walther Risse+	Heer	Oberst	Commander of Infanterie-Regiment 474	22 September 1941	Awarded 704th Oak Leaves 18 January 1945	—
Stephan Rittau	Heer	Generalmajor	Commander of the 129. Infanterie-Division	2 November 1941	—	—
Georg Graf von Rittberg+	Heer	Generalmajor	Commander of the 88. Infanterie-Division	21 February 1944	Awarded 610th Oak Leaves 10 October 1944	—
Hans Rittel	Heer	Oberfeldwebel	Zugführer (platoon leader) in the 13./Grenadier-Regiment 366	7 March 1944	—	—
Anton Ritter	Heer	Leutnant of the Reserves	Leader of the 3./Grenadier-Regiment 88	24 December 1944	—	—
Friedrich-Karl Ritter	Heer	Major of the Reserves	Commander of Infanterie-Bataillon z.b.V. 560	20 October 1944	—	—
Georg Ritter	Heer	Major	Commander of the II./Infanterie-Regiment 62	15 November 1941*	Killed in action 17 October 1941	—
Heinz Ritter	Heer	Hauptmann	Commander of the II./Grenadier-Regiment 44	20 April 1945	—	—
Hugo Ritter	Heer	Major	Commander of the II./Grenadier-Regiment 529	24 February 1945	—	—
[Prof. Dr.] Klaus Ritter (Note: The brackets around the professor and doctor title [Prof. Dr.] denotes that the academic title was attained after the Knight's Cross of the Iron Cross was awarded.)	Heer	Hauptmann	Leader of the II./Grenadier-Regiment 67	28 October 1944	—	—
Willy Ritter	Heer	Hauptmann	Leader of Panzer-Pionier-Bataillon 13	15 January 1944	—	—
Walter Rittershausen	Heer	Hauptmann of the Reserves	Chief of the 3./Infanterie-Regiment 57 (Note: According to Scherzer as chief of the 3./Infanterie-Regiment 36.)	25 February 1942	—	—
Arthur Rittner	Heer	Hauptmann of the Reserves	Leader of the III./Infanterie-Regiment 276	25 October 1942	—	—
Alfred Ritz	Heer	Hauptmann	Commander of the I./Panzergrenadier-Regiment 1	11 December 1944	—	—
Otto Ritz	Luftwaffe	Feldwebel	Pilot in the 10.(Panzer)/Schlachtgeschwader 9	30 September 1944	—	—
Karl Rixecker	Kriegsmarine	Stabsobersteuermann	Commander of Räumboot R-23 in the 1. Räumbootsflottille (Note: According to Scherzer as commander of Räumboot R-23.)	31 May 1940	—	The head of a young man, shown in semi-profile. He wears a peaked cap, naval military uniform with a military decoration in shape of an iron cross displayed at the front of his shirt collar.
Rolf Rocholl+	Heer	Oberleutnant	Leader of the 2./Panzer-Regiment 5	28 July 1942	Awarded 287th Oak Leaves 31 August 1943	—
Hans von Rochow	Heer	Major of the Reserves	Commander of Radfahr-Abteilung 176	20 January 1943	—	—
Hans-Joachim von Rochow	Heer	Oberst	Commander of Grenadier-Regiment 860	26 December 1944	—	—
Johann Rodamer	Heer	Oberfeldwebel	Zugführer (platoon leader) in the 7./Grenadier-Regiment 320	26 March 1944	—	—
Werner Rode	Heer	Oberleutnant	Chief of the 2./Kradschützen-Bataillon 34	17 September 1941	—	—
Heinrich Rodemich? (Note: Heinrich Rodemich's nomination by the troop was received by Heerespersonalamt (HPA—Army Staff Office) on 16 April 1945. Major Joachim Domaschk decided: "By no means sufficient". The HPA-VV file card Nr. 5084a (rejected) was forwarded on 19 April. No further notes or comments were made. The presentation date was assumed by the Association of Knight's Cross Recipients (AKCR). Rodemich is a member of the AKCR.)	Heer	Feldwebel	Zugführer (platoon leader) in the 7./Grenadier-Regiment 988	11 May 1945	—	—
Carl Rodenburg+	Heer	Generalmajor	Commander of the 76. Infanterie-Division	8 October 1942	Awarded 189th Oak Leaves 31 January 1943	—
Georg Roderer	Heer	Feldwebel	Zugführer (platoon leader) in the 5./Grenadier-Regiment 545	9 December 1944	—	—
Otto Rodewald	Heer	Unteroffizier	Group leader in the Nachrichtenzug/Grenadier-Regiment 948	24 March 1944	—	—
Eberhard Rodt+	Heer	Oberstleutnant	Commander of Aufklärungs-Abteilung 25	25 June 1940	Awarded (847th) Oak Leaves 28 April 1945	
[Dr.] Heinrich Roeckl	Heer	Major (Note: According to Scherzer as Major of the Reserves.)	Commander of Radfahr-Bataillon 402	8 September 1941	—	—
Gustav Rödel+	Luftwaffe	Oberleutnant	Staffelkapitän of the 4./Jagdgeschwader 27	22 June 1941 (Note: According to Scherzer on 24 June 1941.)	Awarded 255th Oak Leaves 20 June 1943	—
Josef Röder	Heer	Obergefreiter	Richtschütze (gunner) in the 3./Panzer-Jäger-Abteilung 179	19 January 1943	—	—
Walter Rödlich	Heer	Oberstleutnant	Commander of the II./Panzer-Regiment 4	5 August 1940	—	—
Friedrich Rögelein+	Heer	Major	Commander of the I./Grenadier-Regiment 109	7 January 1944	Awarded 831st Oak Leaves 14 April 1945	—
Hans Roeger	Heer	Unteroffizier	Zugführer (platoon leader) in the 1./Panzer-Füsilier-Regiment "Großdeutschland" (Note: According to Scherzer as Zugführer (platoon leader) in the 1./Füsilier-Regiment "Großdeutschland".)	21 September 1944	—	—
Dr. Wolfgang Röhder	Waffen-SS	SS-Obersturmführer of the Reserves	Chief of the 3./SS-Sturmgeschütz-Abteilung 2 "Das Reich" (Note: According to Scherzer as chief of the 3./SS-Sturmgeschütz-Abteilung 2.)	1 December 1943	—	—
Herbert Röhler	Luftwaffe	Oberst of the Reserves (Note: According to Scherzer as Oberst and commander of Flak-Sturm-Regiment (motorized) 4.)	Commander of Flak-Sturm-Regiment 4	24 October 1944	—	—
Edgar Röhricht	Heer	Generalleutnant	Commander of the 95. Infanterie-Division	15 May 1944	—	—
Hans Roehrig	Luftwaffe	Leutnant	Staffelkapitän of the 9./Jagdgeschwader 53 (Note: According to Scherzer as pilot in the III./Jagdgeschwader 53.)	2 October 1942	—	—
Oskar Röhrig	Heer	Oberfähnrich	Zugführer (platoon leader) in the 1./schwere Panzer-Abteilung 504	4 July 1944	—	—
Heinz Rökker+	Luftwaffe	Oberleutnant	Staffelkapitän of the 2./Nachtjagdgeschwader 2	27 July 1944	Awarded 781st Oak Leaves 12 March 1945	—
Werner Roell	Luftwaffe	Hauptmann	Staffelkapitän of the Stabsstaffel/Sturzkampfgeschwader 77	25 May 1943	—	—
Josef Rölleke	Waffen-SS	SS-Unterscharführer	Messenger squad leader in the III./SS-Panzergrenadier-Regiment 5 "Totenkopf" (Note: According to Scherzer as messenger squad leader in the III./SS-Panzergrenadier-Regiment 5.)	16 June 1944	—	—
Kurt Röpke+	Heer	Generalmajor	Commander of the 46. Infanterie-Division	17 November 1943	Awarded 830th Oak Leaves 14 April 1945	—
Rudolf Roesch	Luftwaffe	Oberleutnant	Staffelkapitän of the 9./Kampfgeschwader 51 (Note: According to Scherzer as Staffelkapitän in the III./Kampfgeschwader 51.)	26 March 1944	—	—
Erich Röseke	Heer	Oberleutnant of the Reserves	Leader of the 9./Jäger-Regiment 1 "Brandenburg"	14 April 1945	—	—
Hans-Rudolf Rösing	Kriegsmarine	Korvettenkapitän	Chief of the 7. Unterseebootsflottille and commander of U-48	29 August 1940	—	
Gerd Roeske	Heer	Hauptmann (Note: According to Scherzer as Hauptmann of the Reserves.)	Leader of Bataillon "Feldherrnhalle"	11 March 1945*	Killed in action 19 February 1945	—
Karl Roesler	Heer	Oberst	Commander of Grenadier-Regiment 1056	20 October 1944 (Note: According to Scherzer on 28 October 1944.)	—	—
Rudolf Roesner	Heer	Hauptmann	Commander of the I./Jäger-Regiment 38	18 April 1943	—	—
Wilhelm-Richard Rössiger	Luftwaffe	Oberleutnant	Staffelkapitän of the 2./Erprobungsgruppe 210	1 October 1940*	Killed in action 27 September 1940	—
Erwin Franz Roestel? (Note: No evidence regarding the presentation of the Knight's Cross of the Iron Cross to Erwin Franz Roestel can be found in the German Federal Archives. Walther-Peer Fellgiebel states about Roestel: "Presentation Heeresgruppe Mitte before 3 May 1945", thus making it unlawful. Fellgiebel certified, as head of the order commission of the Association of Knight's Cross Recipients (AKCR), in a letter dated 11 June 1974 to Roestel that the AKCR has accepted him as a recipient of the Knight's Cross of the Iron, legitimized by the Dönitz-decree. The files of the AKCR reveal the following facts: Roestel assumed that Ferdinand Schörner had nominated him for the Knight's Cross in April 1945 because Schörner had said he would do so: " ... Schörner and I were standing with the famous test pilot Hanna Reitsch ... at a street in Marklissa ... Schörner then asked me ... Why don't you have the Knight's Cross already?... I answered: Because I am an assault artillerist. ... But this time ... you will definitely get the Knight's Cross, because I will take care of it!", so Schörner. Roestel therefore strongly believes that Schörner had nominated him. To the question, why the presentation was not made before the war ended, Roestel answered: "I can only assume that his nomination for my Knight's Cross was lost." Roestel sent an affidavit 24 years later to Schörner asking him for confirmation. Schörner answered: "Even though I cannot remember every detail I can confirm the factual content ... in all relevant points. The presentation to Roestel, based on my nomination, was the last honor bestowed by the 10th SS Panzer Division Frundsberg." Veit Scherzer concluded: Schörner did not confirm that he made the presentation to Roestel. He claimed to have made a nomination. Therefore it cannot be a direct presentation by Schörner himself. This leaves two alternatives, a presentation via the command chain or a direct presentation by Hitler. A nomination by the troop via the Heerespersonalamt (HPA—Army Staff Office) is not verifiable. A presentation via the command chain must therefore be ruled out. Roestel's reference to Hanna Reitsch, who managed to evacuate Feldmarschall Robert Ritter von Greim from Berlin on 28 April 1945, indicates that the meeting of Roestel, Reitsch and Schörner could only have taken place after 28 April. This however rules out a direct presentation by Hitler. All the radio connection to the Führerbunker were down since 5:00 on 28 April 1945. According to the AKCR the award was presented in accordance with the Dönitz-decree. This is illegal according to the Deutsche Dienststelle (WASt) and lacks legal justification. The presentation date "3 May 1945" was assigned by Fellgiebel. Roestel was a member of the AKCR.)	Waffen-SS	SS-Obersturmbannführer of the Reserves	Commander of SS-Panzerjäger-(Sturmgeschütz)Abteilung 10 "Frundsberg" and leader of a Kampfgruppe	3 May 1945	—	—
Hans Rötche (Note: According to Scherzer his name is Johannes Rötche.)	Luftwaffe	Fahnenjunker-Oberfeldwebel	Pilot in the 16./Transportgeschwader 1	18 November 1944	—	—
Siegfried Röthke	Luftwaffe	Oberleutnant	Staffelkapitän of the 6./Kampfgeschwader 4 "General Wever"	2 June 1943	—	—
Herbert Roewer	Luftwaffe	Oberfeldwebel	Pilot in the 9.(Eis)/Kampfgeschwader 3 "Lützow"	3 July 1943*	Killed in action 5 March 1943 (Note: According to Scherzer missing in action since 11 May 1943.)	—
Peter Roewer	Heer	Major of the Reserves	Leader of Grenadier-Regiment 225	13 January 1945	—	—
Konstantin Rogalla von Bieberstein	Heer	Major	Commander of Panzergrenadier-Regiment 114	24 July 1943*	Killed in action 14 July 1943 (Note: According to Scherzer on 13 July 1943.)	—
Franz Rogalski+	Heer	Oberfeldwebel	Shock troops leader in Sturm-Bataillon AOK 8 (Note: According to Scherzer as leader in Sturm-Bataillon AOK 8.)	17 March 1944	Awarded 775th Oak Leaves 11 March 1945	—
Alfred Rogge? (Note: Only a copy of the teleprinter message submitted nomination by the troop to the Heerespersonalamt (HPA—Army Staff Office) was retained. There is not a single comment or indication on this copy indicating that the nomination was further processed. A file card listing the same information is filed among the rejected nominations. According to the Association of Knight's Cross Recipients (AKCR) the award was presented in accordance with the Dönitz-decree. This is illegal according to the Deutsche Dienststelle (WASt) and lacks legal justification. The presentation date was copied by Fellgiebel and Krätschmer.)	Waffen-SS	SS-Obersturmführer	Leader of the 1./SS-Festungs-Regiment 1 "Besslein" (Breslau)	9 May 1945	—	—
Bernhard Rogge+	Kriegsmarine	Kapitän zur See	Commander of auxiliary cruiser Atlantis (HSK-2)	7 December 1940	Awarded 45th Oak Leaves 31 December 1941	
Rudolf Rogge	Heer	Hauptmann of the Reserves	Leader of the I./Artillerie-Regiment 122	18 November 1943*	Killed in action 28 September 1943 (Note: According to Scherzer on 15 October 1943.)	—
Ulrich Roggenbau	Heer	Oberleutnant of the Reserves	Chief of the 7./Grenadier-Regiment 254	30 November 1943	—	—
Franz Roggenland	Heer	Oberfeldwebel	Zugführer (platoon leader) in the 10./Panzergrenadier-Regiment 67	4 October 1944	—	—
Hans Rogner	Heer	Hauptmann	Leader of Pionier-Ersatz and Ausbildungs Bataillon 213 (Note: According to Scherzer as leader of Pionier-Ersatz and Ausbildungs Bataillon 213 in the fortress Glogau.)	11 March 1945	—	—
Walter Rohde	Heer	Feldwebel	Zugführer (platoon leader) in the 6./Panzergrenadier-Regiment 25	22 September 1943	—	—
Kurt Rohlfs	Heer	Hauptmann of the Reserves	Commander of Pionier-Bataillon 20	1 January 1944	—	—
Hans Rohr	Heer	Leutnant of the Reserves	Zugführer (platoon leader) in the 7./Gebirgsjäger-Regiment 139	20 June 1940	—	—
Hans-Babo von Rohr+	Heer	Leutnant (Note: According to Scherzer as Leutnant of the Reserves.)	Zugführer (platoon leader) in the 2./Panzer-Regiment 25	5 November 1944	Awarded 754th Oak Leaves 24 February 1945	—
Josef Rohrbacher	Heer	Oberwachtmeister	Zugführer (platoon leader) in the 3./Sturmgeschütz-Brigade 245 (Note: According to Scherzer as leader 2nd platoon/3rd battery/Sturmgeschütz-Brigade 245.)	4 May 1944	—	—
Kurt Rohrbeck	Heer	Oberleutnant	Deputy leader of Aufklärungs-Lehr-Abteilung 1 (Note: According to Scherzer as leader of Aufklärungs-Lehr-Abteilung 1.)	3 November 1944	—	—
Hellmut Rohweder	Kriegsmarine	Kapitänleutnant (Ing.)	Chief engineer on U-69 and U-514	14 November 1943	—	—
Johannes Rohweder	Heer	Hauptmann	Commander of Panzer-Jäger-Abteilung 670 (self-motorized)	23 August 1941	—	—
Detlev Rohwer	Luftwaffe	Leutnant	Pilot in the I./Jagdgeschwader 3 (Note: According to Scherzer as pilot in the Stab I./Jagdgeschwader 3.)	5 October 1941	—	—
Franz Roka	Luftwaffe	Oberleutnant	Staffelkapitän of the 6./Sturzkampfgeschwader 1 (Note: According to Scherzer as Staffelführer of the 6./Sturzkampfgeschwader 1.)	9 October 1943	—	—
Heinz Roland	Heer	Hauptmann	Leader of the II./Panzergrenadier-Regiment 73	9 December 1944	—	—
Wilhelm Rollmann	Kriegsmarine	Kapitänleutnant	Commander of U-34	31 July 1940	—	—
Herbert Rollwage+	Luftwaffe	Oberfeldwebel	Pilot in the 3./Jagdgeschwader 53 (Note: According to Scherzer on 5 April 1944 as pilot in the 5./Jagdgeschwader 53.)	6 April 1944	Awarded 713th Oak Leaves 24 January 1945	—
Otto Rolser	Heer	Unteroffizier	Zugführer (platoon leader) in the 1./Grenadier-Regiment 727	20 April 1943	—	—
Rudolf Freiherr von Roman+	Heer	Generalmajor	Commander of the 35. Infanterie-Division	19 February 1942	Awarded 313th Oak Leaves 28 October 1943	
Hans-Georg Romeike	Heer	Oberleutnant of the Reserves	Chief of the 6./Grenadier-Regiment 43	3 September 1943	—	—
Oskar Romm	Luftwaffe	Oberfeldwebel	Pilot in the 1./Jagdgeschwader 51 "Mölders" (Note: According to Scherzer as pilot in the I./Jagdgeschwader 51 "Mölders".)	29 February 1944	—	
Erwin Rommel+	Heer	Generalmajor	Commander of the 7. Panzer-Division	27 May 1940	Awarded 10th Oak Leaves 20 March 1941; 6th Swords 20 January 1942; 6th Diamonds 11 March 1943	The head and shoulders of an elderly man, shown in semi-profile. He wears a peaked cap and a military uniform with an Eagle above his right and various military decorations above left breast pocket, and an Iron Cross displayed at the front of his shirt collar. His facial expression is a determined; his eyes are looking into the distance to the left of the camera.
Hans Romott	Heer	Oberfeldwebel	Zugführer (platoon leader) in the 4.(MG)/Grenadier-Regiment 4 (Note: According to Scherzer as Zugführer (platoon leader) in the 4./Grenadier-Regiment 4.)	18 April 1943	—	—
Johannes Rompzick	Heer	Leutnant of the Reserves	Leader of the 6./Grenadier-Regiment 18	22 November 1943	—	—
Arnold von Roon	Luftwaffe	Oberleutnant	Chief of the 3./Fallschirmjäger-Regiment 2	9 July 1941	—	The head of a young man, shown in semi-profile. He wears a peaked cap, a military uniform with a military decoration in shape of an iron cross displayed at the front of his shirt collar.
Ferdinand Roos	Heer	Gefreiter	Company troop leader in the 3./Pionier-Bataillon 6	16 August 1943	—	—
Fritz Roos	Heer	Hauptmann	Leader of the II./Gebirgsjäger-Regiment 13	2 November 1942 (Note: According to Scherzer on 4 November 1942.)	—	—
Hugo Roos	Heer	Hauptmann	Chief of the 11./Infanterie-Regiment 119 (motorized)	13 September 1942 (Note: According to Scherzer on 11 September 1942.)	—	—
Max Ropp	Heer	Oberfeldwebel	Zugführer (platoon leader) in the 11./Gebirgsjäger-Regiment 143	28 October 1944	—	—
Willi Rose	Heer	Oberfeldwebel	Zugführer (platoon leader) in the 11./Grenadier-Regiment 96	22 January 1944*	Died of wounds 4 December 1943	—
Kersten Freiherr von Rosen	Heer	Oberstleutnant	Commander of Grenadier-Regiment 88	26 December 1944	—	—
Helmut Rosenbaum	Kriegsmarine	Kapitänleutnant	Commander of U-73	12 August 1942	—	—
Hans Rosenheinrich	Heer	Obergefreiter	Group leader in the 3./Grenadier-Regiment 173	5 November 1944	—	—
Willi Rosin	Heer	Oberleutnant of the Reserves	Chief of the 6./Grenadier-Regiment 328	18 November 1944	—	—
[Dr.] Dipl.-Ing. Fritz Roske	Heer	Oberst	Commander of Infanterie-Regiment 194	20 January 1943	—	—
Heinrich Roßbach	Heer	Hauptmann of the Reserves	Commander of the II./Grenadier-Regiment 89	12 December 1942	—	—
Karl-Heinz Roßbach	Heer	Feldwebel	Zugführer (platoon leader) in the 2./Panzergrenadier-Regiment 7	6 June 1943	—	—
Christian Roßfeld	Heer	Oberfeldwebel	Zugführer (platoon leader) in the 10./Infanterie-Regiment 62	5 October 1941	—	—
Emil Roßhart	Heer	Obergefreiter	Group leader in the 2./Sturm-Regiment 195	3 April 1943	—	—
Theodor Rossiwall	Luftwaffe	Hauptmann	Staffelkapitän of the 5./Zerstörergeschwader 26 "Horst Wessel"	6 August 1941	—	
Vincenz Rossler	Heer	Leutnant of the Reserves	Zugführer (platoon leader) in the Panzer-Abteilung 190	28 October 1944	—	—
Edmund Roßmann	Luftwaffe	Feldwebel	Pilot in the 7./Jagdgeschwader 52	19 March 1942	—	—
Emil Roßmann	Heer	Leutnant of the Reserves	Leader of the 2./Panzer-Regiment 26	23 October 1944	—	—
[Dr.] Karl Roßmann+	Luftwaffe	Oberleutnant	Chief of the 16./Flak-Regiment "General Göring" (motorized)	12 November 1941	Awarded 725th Oak Leaves 1 February 1945	—
Erich Rossner	Waffen-SS	SS-Unterscharführer	Gun leader in the 2./SS-Panzer-Jäger-Abteilung "Reich"	25 August 1941*	Died of wounds 30 July 1941 (Note: According to Ernst-Günther Krätschmer and Veit Scherzer, Erich Rossner died on 30 July 1941, however Walther-Peer Fellgiebel states he died of wounds sustained in the defensive battle at Yelnya on 12 September 1941.)	—
Hans-Günther von Rost	Heer	Generalleutnant	Commander of Reichsgrenadier-Division "Hoch- und Deutschmeister"	21 March 1945	—	—
Erwin Rostin	Kriegsmarine	Kapitänleutnant	Commander of U-158	28 June 1942	—	—
Ernst-August Roth	Luftwaffe	Generalmajor	Fliegerführer Nord (Note: According to Scherzer as Fliegerführer Nord (Ost).)	6 November 1943	—	—
Günther Roth	Luftwaffe	Oberleutnant	Pilot in the IV.(K)/Lehrgeschwader 1	26 March 1944	—	—
Hans Roth	Luftwaffe	Oberst	Commander of Flak-Regiment 38	9 January 1945	—	—
Heinrich Roth	Heer	Wachtmeister	Vorgeschobener Beobachter (forward observer) in the 4./Artillerie-Regiment 235	18 January 1945	—	—
Hermann Roth	Heer	Oberleutnant of the Reserves	Chief of the 1./Feld-Ersatz-Bataillon 212	27 July 1944	—	—
Jakob Roth	Heer	Unteroffizier	Zugführer (platoon leader) in the 2./Grenadier-Regiment 208	4 June 1944	—	—
Matthias Roth	Heer	Oberleutnant	Leader of the II./Grenadier-Regiment 105	21 February 1944	—	—
Wilhelm Roth	Heer	Oberwachtmeister	Zugführer (platoon leader) in the 1./Gebirgs-Aufklärungs-Abteilung 94	24 June 1944	—	—
Heinz Rothardt (Note: According to Scherzer name is spelled Heinz Rothhardt.)	Heer	Unteroffizier	Zugführer (platoon leader) in the 2./Panzer-Aufklärungs-Abteilung 11	30 September 1943	—	—
Friedrich Rothe	Heer	Oberleutnant	Leader of the 5./Panzergrenadier-Regiment 93	17 March 1945	—	—
Gerhard Rothe	Luftwaffe	Feldwebel	Radio operator in the III./Sturzkampfgeschwader 1	12 November 1943	—	—
Karl Rothenburg	Heer	Oberst	Commander of Panzer-Regiment 25	3 June 1940	—	—
Willi Rothhaar	Heer	Leutnant (Note: According to Scherzer as Leutnant of the Reserves and leader of the 3./Grenadier-Regiment 544.)	Leader of the 3.(MG)/Grenadier-Regiment 544	5 September 1944	—	—
Friedrich-Wilhelm von Rothkirch und Panthen	Heer	Generalmajor	Commander of the 13. Infanterie-Division (motorized)	15 August 1940	—	—
Hans-Siegfried Graf von Rothkirch und Trach	Heer	Hauptmann of the Reserves	Commander of the I./Panzer-Regiment 26	4 October 1944	—	—
Anton Rothmaier	Heer	Oberfeldwebel	Zugführer (platoon leader) in the 6./Grenadier-Regiment 335	9 June 1944 (Note: According to Scherzer on 18 February 1945.)	—	—
Dipl.-Ing. Fritz-Joachim Freiherr von Rotsmann	Heer	Major of the Reserves	Commander of the I./Artillerie-Regiment 176	31 January 1943	—	—
Rudolf Rott	Waffen-SS	SS-Obersturmführer	Chief of the 1./SS-Panzer-Abteilung 11 "Nordland" (Note: According to Scherzer as chief of the 1./SS-Panzer-Abteilung 11 "Hermann von Salza".)	28 February 1945*	Killed in action 12 February 1945	—
Walter Rott	Heer	Oberleutnant (Note: According to Scherzer as Oberleutnant of the Reserves.)	Chief of the 5./Grenadier-Regiment 1122	11 March 1945	—	—
Johann Rottensteiner	Heer	Obergefreiter	Group leader in the Stabskompanie/Grenadier-Regiment 353	18 February 1945	—	—
Josef Rotter	Heer	Oberfeldwebel	Zugführer (platoon leader) in the 10./Jäger-Regiment 204	9 August 1943	—	—
Theodor Rowehl	Luftwaffe	Oberstleutnant	Commander of Aufklärungs-Gruppe des OBdL	27 September 1940	—	The head of a man, shown in semi-profile. He wears a military uniform with a military decoration in shape of an iron cross displayed at the front of his shirt collar. His hair is dark and combed to back.
Willi Rowohl	Heer	Oberfeldwebel	Zugführer (platoon leader) in the 2./Schützen-Regiment 115	12 July 1942	—	—
Rudolf Roy	Waffen-SS	SS-Oberscharführer	Panzer commander and Zugführer (platoon leader) in the 1./SS-Panzer-Jäger-Abteilung 12 "Hitlerjugend" (Note: According to Scherzer as Zugführer (platoon leader) in the 1./SS-Panzer-Jäger-Abteilung 12.)	16 October 1944	—	—
Walter Rubarth	Heer	Feldwebel	Shock troops leader in the 2./Pionier-Bataillon 49 (motorized) (Note: According to Scherzer as shock troops leader in the 2./Pionier-Bataillon 49.)	3 June 1940	—	The head of a young man, shown in semi-profile. He wears a military uniform with a military decoration in shape of an iron cross displayed at the front of his shirt collar. His hair is parted and combed to back.
Karl Rubatscher	Waffen-SS	SS-Obersturmführer of the Reserves	Adjutant in the I./SS-Grenadier-Regiment 8 (motorized) (Note: According to Scherzer as adjutant in the I./SS-Grenadier-Regiment (motorized) 39.)	27 December 1943	—	—
Walter Rubensdörffer	Luftwaffe	Hauptmann	Gruppenkommandeur of Erprobungsgruppe 210	19 August 1940*	Killed in action 15 August 1940	—
Franz Rubesch	Luftwaffe	Oberstleutnant	Commander of gemischte Flak-Abteilung 303 (Note: According to Scherzer as commander of gemischte Flak-Abteilung 303 (deployable).)	30 September 1944	—	—
Hans Ruckau	Heer	Oberstleutnant (Note: According to Scherzer as Oberstleutnant im Generalstab (in the General Staff).)	Leader of Grenadier-Regiment 1091	5 March 1945	—	—
Helmuth von Ruckteschell+	Kriegsmarine	Korvettenkapitän of the Reserves	Commander of auxiliary cruiser Widder (HSK-3)	31 October 1940	Awarded 158th Oak Leaves 23 December 1942	—
Erich Rudat	Heer	Rittmeister	Commander of Divisions-Füsilier-Bataillon 227 (A.A.)	29 February 1944	—	—
Horst Rudat	Luftwaffe	Oberleutnant	Staffelkapitän of the 2./Kampfgeschwader 55	24 March 1943	—	—
Hans-Ulrich Rudel+	Luftwaffe	Oberleutnant	Staffelkapitän of the 9./Sturzkampfgeschwader 2 "Immelmann" (Note: According to Scherzer as pilot and technical officer in the III./Sturzkampfgeschwader 2 "Immelmann")	6 January 1942	Awarded 229th Oak Leaves 14 April 1943; 42nd Swords 25 November 1943; 10th Diamonds 29 March 1944; 1st Golden Oak Leaves 29 December 1944	
Oskar Rudler	Heer	Gefreiter	Group leader in the 3./Jäger-Regiment 229	5 April 1945	—	—
Erich Rudnick	Heer	Leutnant	Pioneer Zugführer (platoon leader) in Stabskompanie/Grenadier-Regiment 45 (Note: According to Scherzer as leader of the regimental pioneer platoon/Grenadier-Regiment 45.)	18 February 1945	—	—
Richard Rudolf	Waffen-SS	SS-Oberscharführer	Zugführer (platoon leader) in the SS-Panzer-Jäger-Abteilung 12 "Hitlerjugend" (Note: According to Scherzer as Zugführer (platoon leader) in the SS-Panzer-Jäger-Abteilung 12.)	18 November 1944	—	—
Walter Rudolph	Heer	Feldwebel	Zugführer (platoon leader) in the 6./Grenadier-Regiment 123	2 June 1943	—	—
Erich Rudorffer+	Luftwaffe	Leutnant	Pilot in the 6./Jagdgeschwader 2 "Richthofen"	1 May 1941	Awarded 447th Oak Leaves 11 April 1944; 126th Swords 26 January 1945	A man wearing a military uniform with a peaked cap on his head.
Karl Rübel	Heer	Generalleutnant	Commander of the 163. Infanterie-Division	13 January 1945	—	—
[Dr.] Günther Rübell	Luftwaffe	Leutnant	Pilot in the 5./Jagdgeschwader 51 "Mölders" (Note: According to Scherzer as pilot in the II./Jagdgeschwader 51 "Mölders".)	14 March 1943	—	—
Julius Rück	Heer	Unteroffizier	Company troop leader in the 1./Grenadier-Regiment 438	12 August 1944	—	—
Adolf Rüd	Waffen-SS	SS-Oberscharführer	Zugführer (platoon leader) in the Stabskompanie/SS-Panzergrenadier-Regiment 3 "Deutschland"	23 August 1944*	Killed in action 2 August 1944	—
Wilhelm von Rüden	Heer	Hauptmann of the Reserves	Adjutant in Divisions-Gruppe 330	16 April 1944	—	—
Ludwig Ruederer	Heer	Oberstleutnant	Commander of Infanterie-Regiment 332	23 October 1941	—	—
Karl Ruef	Heer	Major	Commander of the III./Gebirgsjäger-Regiment 143	28 October 1944	—	—
Helmut Rüffler	Luftwaffe	Oberfeldwebel	Pilot in the 4./Jagdgeschwader 3 "Udet" (Note: According to Scherzer as pilot in the I./Jagdgeschwader 3 "Udet".)	23 December 1942	—	—
Dr. jur. Josef Rüger	Heer	Hauptmann of the Reserves	Commander of the II./Panzergrenadier-Regiment 63	7 March 1944	—	—
[Prof.] Dr. rer. pol. Hans-Joachim Rühle von Lilienstern (Note: The brackets around the professor [Prof.] denotes that the academic title was attained after the Knight's Cross of the Iron Cross was awarded.)	Waffen-SS	SS-Hauptsturmführer of the Reserves	Leader of the I./niederl. SS-Freiwilligen Panzergrenadier-Regiment 48 "General Seyffardt" (Note: According to Scherzer as leader of the I./SS-Freiwilligen Panzergrenadier-Regiment 48 "General Seyffardt" (niederl. Nr. 1).)	12 February 1944	—	—
Wilhelm Rüngeler	Heer	Hauptmann	Commander of Sturm-Pionier-Bataillon 178	11 October 1943	—	—
Werner Freiherr von Ruepprecht	Heer	Major	Leader of Panzergrenadier-Regiment 111	12 December 1944*	Killed in action 23 November 1944	—
Hugo Ruf	Waffen-SS	SS-Oberscharführer	Zugführer (platoon leader) in the 3./SS-Panzer-Regiment 5 "Wiking" (Note: According to Scherzer as Zugführer (platoon leader) in the 3./SS-Panzer-Regiment 5.)	16 October 1944	—	—
Rudolf-Heinz Ruffer	Luftwaffe	Hauptmann	Staffelführer of the 10.(Panzer)/Schlachtgeschwader 9	9 June 1944	—	—
[Prof. Dr.] Friedrich Ruge	Kriegsmarine	Kapitän zur See	Commodore leader of the Minensuchboote West	21 October 1940	—	—
Gerd Ruge+	Heer	Hauptmann	Commander of the I./Panzergrenadier-Regiment 128	7 September 1943	Awarded 648th Oak Leaves 16 November 1944	—
Franz Ruhl	Luftwaffe	Leutnant	Staffelführer of the 4./Jagdgeschwader 3 "Udet"	27 July 1944	—	—
Heinrich Ruhl+	Heer	Major	Commander of Divisions-Füsilier-Bataillon (A.A.) 122	21 September 1944	Awarded 789th Oak Leaves 16 March 1945	—
Herbert Ruhnke	Heer	Unteroffizier	Gun leader in the 3./Panzer-Jäger-Abteilung 294	8 February 1943	—	—
Karl Ruland	Heer	Unteroffizier	Group leader in the 5./Grenadier-Regiment 306	17 March 1944*	Killed in action 26 February 1944	—
Detlev von Rumohr	Heer	Major	Commander of Grenadier-Regiment 211	4 July 1944	—	—
Joachim Rumohr+	Waffen-SS	SS-Obersturmbannführer	Commander of SS-Artillerie-Regiment 8 "Florian Geyer" (Note: According to Scherzer as commander of SS-Artillerie-Regiment 8.)	16 January 1944	Awarded 721st Oak Leaves 1 February 1945	A man wearing a military uniform with an Iron Cross displayed at the front of his uniform collar.
Friedrich Rumpelhardt	Luftwaffe	Leutnant	Radio/wireless operator in the IV./Nachtjagdgeschwader 1	27 July 1944 (Note: According to Scherzer on 8 August 1944.)	—	—
Gerd von Rundstedt+	Heer	Generaloberst	Commander-in-chief of Heeresgruppe Süd	30 September 1939	Awarded 519th Oak Leaves 1 July 1944; 133rd Swords 18 February 1945	A man wearing a military uniform and peaked cap holding a baton.
Fritz Runge	Heer	Leutnant	Deputy leader of the II./Grenadier-Regiment 532 (Note: According to Scherzer as leader of the II./Grenadier-Regiment 532.)	2 November 1943	—	—
Siegfried Runge	Heer	Oberst	Commander of Infanterie-Regiment 279	20 December 1941	—	—
Richard Ruoff	Heer	General der Infanterie	Commanding general of the V. Armeekorps	30 June 1941	—	
Ernst Rupp	Heer	Generalleutnant (Note: According to Scherzer as Generalmajor.)	Commander of the 97. Jäger-Division	7 March 1943	—	—
Friedrich Rupp	Luftwaffe	Leutnant	Pilot in the 7./Jagdgeschwader 54	24 January 1943	—	—
Hermann Ruppert	Luftwaffe	Oberleutnant	Staffelkapitän of the 6./Sturzkampfgeschwader 77	23 November 1941	—	—
Hermann Ruppert	Heer	Leutnant	Zugführer (platoon leader) in the 3./Infanterie-Regiment 15 (motorized)	12 January 1942	—	—
Siegfried Rupprecht	Heer	Oberleutnant	Chief of the 6./Gebirgsjäger-Regiment 85	10 September 1943	—	—
Heinrich Rust	Heer	Oberfeldwebel	Zugführer (platoon leader) in the 9./Grenadier-Regiment 324	12 December 1944	—	—
Dr. jur. Wolfgang Rust+	Heer	Hauptmann	Adjutant of Grenadier-Regiment 11 (motorized) (Note: According to Scherzer as adjutant of Grenadier-Regiment 11.)	24 June 1944	Awarded 771st Oak Leaves 11 March 1945	—
Alfred Rutkowski	Heer	Hauptmann of the Reserves	Commander of Füsilier-Bataillon (A.A.) 126 (Note: According to Scherzer as commander of Füsilier-Bataillon 126.)	15 April 1944	—	—
Wolfgang Ryll	Heer	Oberleutnant	Leader of the 5./Panzer-Regiment 7	13 October 1941	—	—

=== Siegfried Rieger ===
Siegfried Rieger is not listed by the Association of Knight's Cross Recipients (AKCR). According to Veit Scherzer Rieger received the Knight's Cross of the Iron Cross on 18 April 1945, as Oberfeldwebel in the Heer and Sprengkommando of the Luftwaffe I/III in Luftgaukommando Berlin.
