= Joseph Maria von Radowitz =

Joseph Maria von Radowitz may refer to:

- Joseph von Radowitz, Joseph Maria Ernst Christian Wilhelm von Radowitz (1797–1853), Prussian general and statesman
- Joseph Maria von Radowitz, Jr. (1839–1912), German diplomat
- Joseph von Radowitz (general), Joseph Maria Hermann Ernst Peter Hans von Radowitz (1899–1956), German Wehrmacht and Bundeswehr general
