= Philipp Müller-Gebhard =

German general (1889–1970)

- Born: 15 October 1889
- Died: 2 July 1970 (aged 80)
- Military career
- Allegiance: Nazi Germany
- Branch: German Army (Wehrmacht)
- Rank: Generalleutnant
- Commands: 169th Infantry Division; 72nd Infantry Division
- Conflicts: World War II
- Awards: Knight's Cross of the Iron Cross

Philipp Müller-Gebhard (15 October 1889 – 2 July 1970) was a general in the Wehrmacht of Nazi Germany during World War II. He was a recipient of the Knight's Cross of the Iron Cross.

== Awards and decorations ==
- Knight's Cross of the Iron Cross on 3 September 1942 as Generalleutnant and commander of 72. Infanterie-Division

Military offices
Preceded by None	Commander of 169. Infanterie-Division; 29 November 1939 – 1 December 1939	Succeeded by Generalleutnant Heinrich Kirchheim
Preceded by General der Infanterie Franz Mattenklott	Commander of 72. Infanterie-Division; 6 November 1940 – 10 July 1942	Succeeded by Generalmajor Curt Souchay
Preceded by Generalmajor Curt Souchay	Commander of 72. Infanterie-Division; 24 November 1942 – 17 February 1943	Succeeded by Generalleutnant Ralph Graf von Oriola
Preceded by Generalleutnant Ralph Graf von Oriola	Commander of 72. Infanterie-Division; 3 May 1943 – 1 November 1943	Succeeded by Generalleutnant Erwin Menny
