= Kurt Dittmar =

German general (1891–1959)

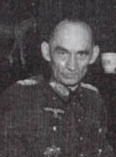
- Born: 5 January 1891; Magdeburg, Province of Saxony, Kingdom of Prussia, German Empire
- Died: 26 April 1959 (aged 68); Stadtoldendorf, Lower Saxony, West Germany
- Military career
- Allegiance: German Empire; Weimar Republic; Nazi Germany
- Branch: German Army
- Service years: 1909–1945
- Rank: Generalleutnant
- Commands: 169th Infantry Division
- Conflicts: World War I; World War II; Operation Polarfuchs
- Awards: German Cross in Gold; Iron Cross with 1939 Clasp

Kurt Dittmar (5 January 1891 – 26 April 1959) was a German general in World War II, who served as the Official Military Commentator of the German Armed Forces.

== Biography ==
Dittmar entered the Imperial German Army as Officer candidate in March 1909. He was assigned to the 4th Engineer Battalion (Magdeburgisches Pionier-Bataillon Nr.4.) and commissioned a second lieutenant one year later. During World War I, Dittmar served with the rank of captain as a company commander and also as a temporary battalion commander.

After the War, Dittmar entered the Reichswehr and continued to serve with engineers units, where he reached the rank of Colonel (Oberst) to the date of 1 April 1936. With the outbreak of the World War II, Dittmar served as a commander of the engineer school in Berlin-Karlshorst.

He became a divisional commander in February 1941 and led the 169th Infantry Division, which was later stationed in Finland. In the summer of 1941, he participated in Operation Polarfuchs but was evacuated from Finland a few months later due to illness. He was rewarded for his leadership with the German Cross in Gold and also received Order of the Cross of Liberty, 1st Class with Swords by the Finnish government.

He was posted to the Army High Command Leader Reserve in October 1941, and became General for Special Employment in April 1942. In that post, which he held over the remainder of his war service, he was the Official Military Commentator of the German Armed Forces. A rumour that he committed suicide in April 1945 was dispelled on the 23rd when he surrendered to soldiers of the 30th U.S. Infantry Division at Magdeburg. He later told his captors that the National Redoubt did not exist. Dittmar was held in U.S. and later in British captivity until May 1948.

== Awards and decorations ==
- Order of the Cross of Liberty, 1st Class with Swords (26 October 1941)
- German Cross in Gold (19 December 1941)
- 1939 Clasps to the Iron Cross, 1st and 2nd class
- Prussian Order of the Crown, 4th Class (World War I award)
- Prussian Iron Cross of 1914, 1st and 2nd Class (World War I award)
- Hanseatic Cross of Lübeck (World War I award)
- The Honour Cross of the World War 1914/1918 (Post World War I award)
- Wehrmacht Long Service Award I. - IV. Class

Military offices
Preceded by Heinrich Kirchheim	General Officer Commanding 169th Infantry Division; February 1941 – September 1941	Succeeded by Hermann Tittel
