= Heinrich Kirchheim =

German generalleutnant who served in World Wars I and II

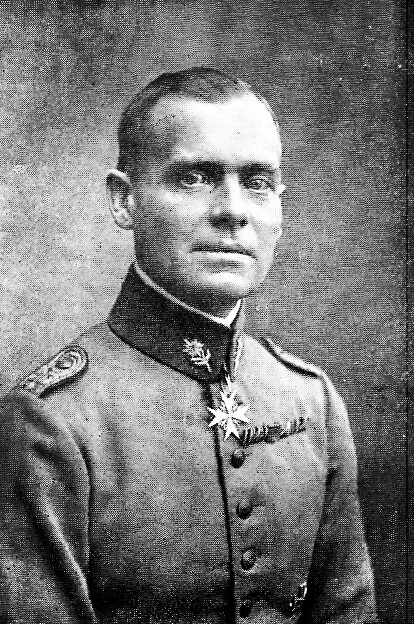
- Heinrich Georg Kirchheim, in the picture with the collar badge of his Freikorps (volunteer Jäger), was one of only 19 knights of the Order "Pour le Mérite" with the Knight's Cross of the Iron Cross.
- Born: 6 April 1882; Groß Salze, Kreis Calbe a./S., Regierungsbezirk Magdeburg, Province of Saxony, Kingdom of Prussia, German Empire
- Died: 14 December 1973 (aged 91); Lüdenscheid, North Rhine-Westphalia, West Germany
- Relatives: ∞ 1926 Hildegard Schneider; 2 children
- Military career
- Allegiance: Kingdom of Prussia; German Empire (to 1918); Weimar Republic (to 1933); Nazi Germany
- Branch: Prussian Army; Schutztruppe; Imperial German Army; Freikorps; Reichswehr; Army
- Service years: 1899–1945
- Rank: Generalleutnant
- Commands: 169. Infantry Division; Special Office Libya; Staff Tropics in OKH; Special-Staff C in OKH
- Conflicts: Herero Wars; World War I World War II
- Awards: Iron Cross; Pour le Mérite; Knight's Cross of the Iron Cross
- Other work: Businessman (1932–1934)

Heinrich Georg Kirchheim (6 April 1882 – 14 December 1973) was a German generalleutnant who served in both World War I and World War II. He is also one of few German officers who were awarded the Pour le Mérite and the Knight's Cross of the Iron Cross. He also served as a deputy member on the "Court of Military Honour," a drumhead court-martial that expelled many of the officers involved in the 20 July Plot from the Army before handing them over to the People's Court.

== Early military career ==
Kirchheim entered the Imperial Army as an officer candidate on 1 May 1899. He became a Leutnant with the Infanterie-Regiment Prinz Friedrich der Niederlande (2. Westfälisches) Nr. 15 in Minden on 18 October 1900. On 1 October 1904 he transferred to the Schutztruppe of German Southwest Africa, going on an eight-year tour of duty in the colony. In January 1904, the native Herero tribe of Southwest Africa rebelled against German colonial rule over the expropriation of their land and cattle. Later in the year, the Nama/Hottentot tribe also took up arms against their colonial rulers, beginning the Herero Wars. Generalleutnant Lothar von Trotha, the Military Commander of German Southwest Africa, suppressed the rebellion with extreme brutality, relying on a policy of ethnic cleansing backed by forced labor, deportations, wholesale execution of prisoners and the use of concentration camps. The Germans crushed the rebellion by early 1907 and by 1908 they re-established authority over the territory. Heinrich won the Order of the Crown (Prussia) 4th Class with Swords for his actions against fighting the rebelling African tribes. Six years later World War I began and the fighting eventually spread to Africa. In September 1914 British and South Africa troops invaded the colony and by July 1915 they had conquered the territory.

== First World War ==
At the beginning of the First World War, Kirchheim became a company commander in the Hanoverian Jäger Battalion No. 10 . With his battalion he took part in the fighting on the Western Front, There he was promoted to captain on 24 August 1914. On the same day Kirchheim was shot through the neck while attempting to take an English battery at Fontaine aux Pierre east of Cambrai . After his recovery he and his battalion transferred to the newly founded Alpine Corps in May 1915 and was deployed with them in Tyrol, Austria-Hungary fighting at the First Battle of the Isonzo. The Archduke Karl visited the battalion on 27 June and gave him the Edelweiss badge, which was worn until the end of the campaign to Shako and cap. His battalion would transfer back to Western Front in early 1916 taking part in the Battle of Verdun where Kirchheim was wounded and sent to Charleville hospital. On 15 August Kirchheim was appointed commander of the battalion. On 25 August 1918 Kirchheim led his battalion to storm the Kemmel when an artillery shell wounded him in the head. For his high merit in the storming Kirchheim was submitted on 12 May for the Pour le Mérite, but did not receive it. In the defensive battle between Somme and Oise, Kirchheim and his battalion again distinguished themselves in such a way that he was proposed for the second time by his regimental commander for the award. On 13 October 1918 Kaiser Wilhelm II issued a cabinet order to award the Pour le Mérite to the deserving officer. In the last weeks of the war, Kirchheim and his battalion were again redeployed, this time they saw action in the Balkans. After the retreat fighting in Serbia and Macedonia, they returned to Germany via Hungary and the Danube and Sava rivers.

== Interwar Era ==
After the end of the war, Kirchheim formed the "Freiwilliges Hannoversches Jäger-Bataillon Kirchheim", which formed part of the Grenschutz Ost, a group within the Freikorps. After helping put down the German Revolution of 1918-1919 and subsequent Spartacus uprising, Kirchheim was taken into the new German military, the Reichswehr. He served in various staff positions and on 1 February 1930 became commandant of Glatz. Kirchheim was promoted to Colonel on 1 April 1931, and in March 1932, he retired from the Reichswehr. After Adolf Hitler came into power the military was reorganized and Heinrich Kirchheim was recalled for service. On 1 October 1934 he was appointed military district commander of the training battalion of the Arnsberg Infantry Regiment. In November, he was appointed military district leader of Cologne, and on 1 June 1938 he became military district leader of Vienna.

== World War II ==
With the start of World War II, Kirchheim was made Commander of Infantry Regiment 276 of the 94th Infantry Division in October 1939 and later in 1941 he became Commander of the 169th Infantry Division. Initially held in reserve, Kirchheim's division took part in the second phase of the Invasion of France in June 1940 under General Ernst Busch and the 16th Army. Following the Franco-German armistice, the 169th Infantry Division remained in Lorraine under the 1st Army on occupation duties for the remainder of the year. In March 1941 he was made leader of Special Staff Libya, he was delegated with the leadership of elements of the Italian 27th Brescia Infantry Division. Arriving in Libya on 24 February 1941, Kirchheim and his special staff consisted of officers with military experience in Africa prior to and during World War I. Kirchheim was charged with studying the varied conditions in North Africa, however General Erwin Rommel, recently arrived and the commanding general of the newly formed German Afrika Korps chose to use Kirchheim's staff to reinforce his understrength field formations. During Rommel's first offensive in Cyrenaica (31 March 1941 – 12 April 1941), Generalmajor Kirchheim led the northern group that pushed up the Via Balbia coast road from Agedabia. Upon reaching Benghazi on 4 April 1941, Kirchheim's force split into two columns. The northernmost column, a reinforced regimental sized detachment of one infantry and one artillery battalion of the Italian 27th Brescia Infantry Division and one infantry battalion of the Italian 25th Bologna Infantry Division, commanded by Kirchheim, continued advancing up the Via Balbia to clear Australian rearguards. The German Reconnaissance Battalion 3, commanded by Oberstleutnant Irnfried Freiherr von Wechmar, hooked east and crossed the desert south of the Jebel el Akdar hills to Mechili. Securing northern Cyrenaica, Kirchheim's Brescia column linked up with the German Machinegun Battalion 8, commanded by Oberstleutnant Gustav Ponath, at Derna on 8 April 1941. Following his advance up the Via Balbia, Generalmajor Kirchheim next saw action during Rommel's attempt to seize the critical coastal fortress of Tobruk. On 16 May 1941, Rommel placed Kirchheim in command of a battle group formed from the bulk of Generalmajor Johannes Streich's 5th Light Division for an assault against the Ras el Madauer high ground on the Tobruk defensive perimeter. Though the group did seize the high ground, the attempt to capture Tobruk failed after suffering the loss of almost 1,400 German and Italian dead, wounded and missing. Rommel was dissatisfied with Kirchheim, and replaced him with Johann von Ravenstein on 30 May.

With the Axis defeat in Africa in May 1943 the Special Staff Libya was dissolved and Kirchheim was put into the reserves. In August 1944 he was appointed a member of the Army Court of Honor, established by Generalfeldmarschall Wilhelm Keitel under Hitler's orders, the court investigated all army officers suspected of involvement in the conspiracy that culminated with the 20 July 1944 assassination attempt on Hitler. The court members consisted of Generalfeldmarschall Gerd von Rundstedt, Generaloberst Heinz Guderian, General der Infanterie Walter Schroth and Generalleutnant Karl-Wilhelm Specht. Additionally, General der Infanterie Karl Kriebel and Generalleutnant Kirchheim were designated standing representatives for members who could not attend a court sitting.[2] Generalmajor Ernst Maisel, Chief of the Office Group for Officers’ Education and Welfare (P 2) of the Army Personnel Office, served as the court protocol officer. Based on evidence provided by the Gestapo (suspects did not appear in person to defend themselves), the court decided whether a suspect was “expelled” or “discharged” from the Army. The former verdict would result in a suspect's release from military jurisdiction to face trial before the infamous People's Court and subsequent execution. In a special meeting on 4 October 1944, the court heard the evidence implicating Generalleutnant Dr. phil. Hans Speidel in the conspiracy.[3] The court refused to expel Speidel from the Army opting instead for his discharge. Although he spent the rest of the war in prison, the verdict insured Speidel did not appear before the People's Court. He was captured by the Americans on 12 April 1945 and made a prisoner of war. He would later be transferred from Trent Park Camp to Island Farm Special Camp 11 from Camp 1 on 24 January 1946. In September 1947 he was released from prison.

== Dates of rank ==
- Fähnrich: 27 January 1900
- Leutnant: 18 October 1900
- Oberleutnant: 10 February 1910
- Hauptmann: 15 September 1914
- Major: 1 April 1923
- Oberstleutnant: 1 November 1928
- Oberst: 11 April 1931
- Charakter als Generalmajor: 27 August 1939
- Generalmajor: 1 July 1940
- Generalleutnant: 1 July 1942

== Awards and decorations ==
- Prussian Order of the Crown, 4th Class with Swords on 3 November 1905
- South West Africa Commemorative Medal (German Empire) with several battle clasps
- Iron Cross (1914), 2nd and 1st Class
  - 2nd Class on 15 October 1914
  - 1st Class on 4 April 1916
- Saxe-Meiningen Cross for Merit in War on 20 October 1915
- Austrian Military Merit Cross, 3rd Class with War Decoration (ÖM3K) on 14 November 1915
- Bavarian Military Merit Order, 4th Class with Swords (BMV4X/BM4X) on 14 November 1916
- Military Merit Cross (Mecklenburg-Schwerin), 2nd Class on the ribbon for combatants on 19 February 1917
- Prussian Royal House Order of Hohenzollern, Knight's Cross with Swords (HOH3X) on 6 October 1917
- Austrian Order of the Iron Crown, 3rd Class with War Decoration on 2 May 1918
- Wound Badge (1918) in Black on 16 May 1918
- Pour le Mérite on 13 October 1918 as Captain and Commander of the Hanoverian Jäger Battalion No. 10
- Prussian Service Award Cross on 18 June 1920
- Honour Cross of the World War 1914/1918 with Swords
- Wehrmacht Long Service Award, 4th to 1st Class on 2 October 1936
- Repetition Clasp 1939 to the Iron Cross 1914, 2nd and 1st Class
  - 2nd Class on 17 June 1940
  - 1st Class on 8 September 1940
- Knight's Cross of the Iron Cross on 18 May 1941 as Generalmajor and head of the special branch Libya of the OKH and leader of Italian division "Brescia"
- Wound Badge (1939) in Silver on 27 March 1942
- Italian Medal of Military Valor in Silver
- Medal for the Italian-German campaign in Africa in 1942
- Africa Cuff Title in 1943

Military offices
Preceded by Generalleutnant Philipp Müller-Gebhard	Commander of 169. Infanterie-Division; 1 December 1939 – 1 February 1941	Succeeded by Generalleutnant Kurt Dittmar
