= Siegfried Rein =

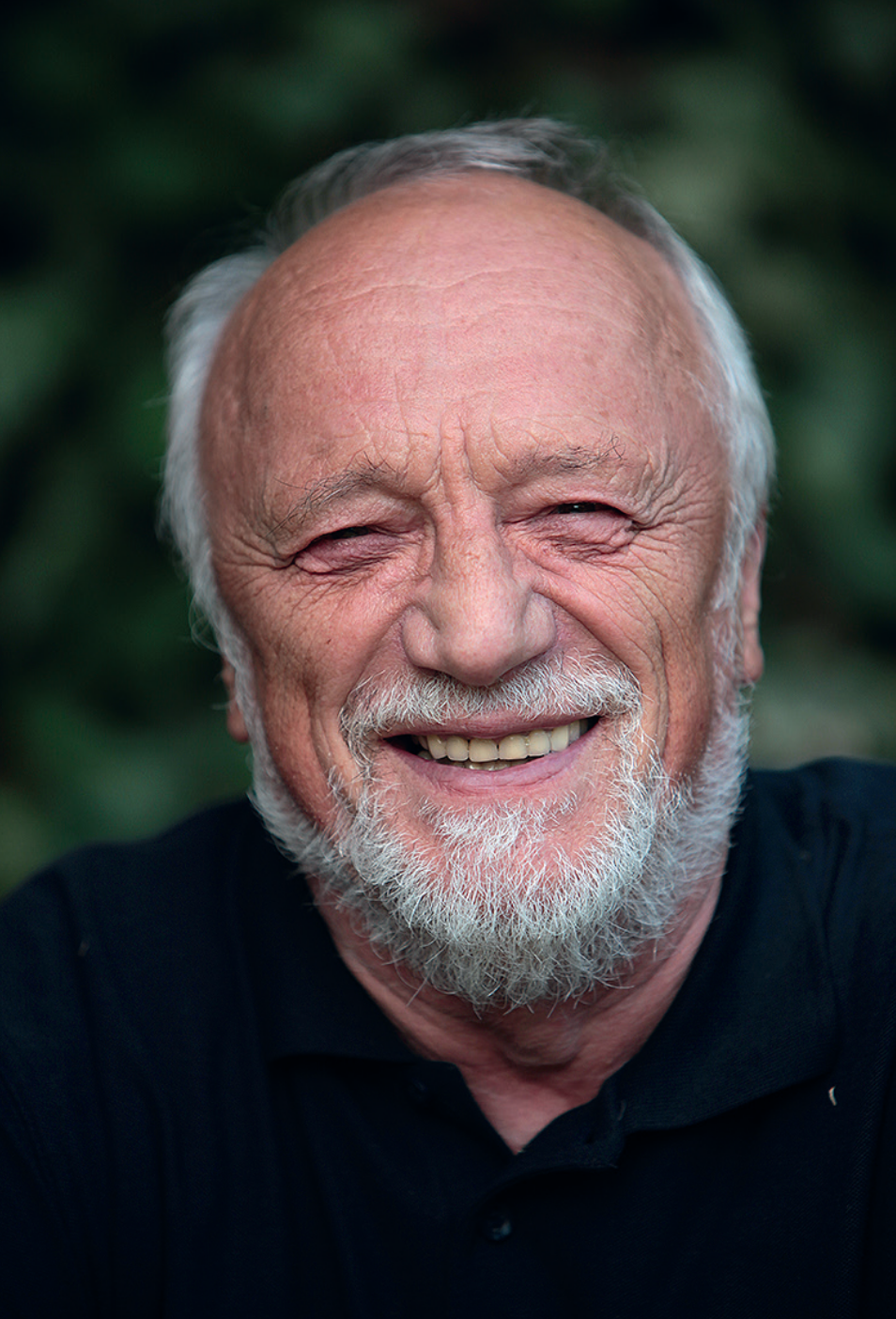
Portrait of Siegfried Rein.

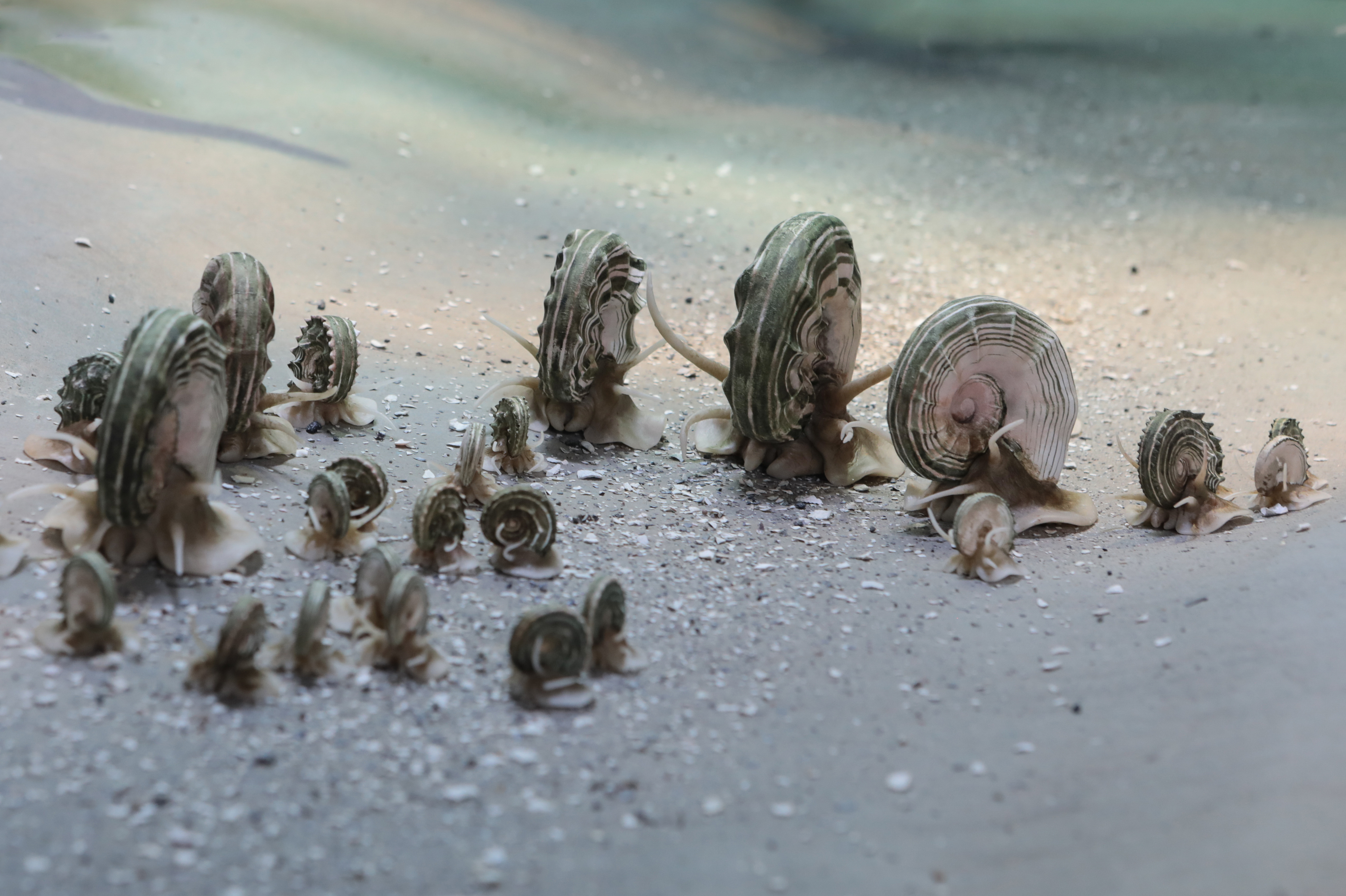
Group of benthic, herd-like population of the biospecies Ceratites nodosus within the chronospecies Ceratites evolutus crawling across the seafloor. Visible sexual dimorphism (e-type and p-type). Reconstruction by Sebastian Brandt, exhibited at Schloss Ehrenstein, Germany.

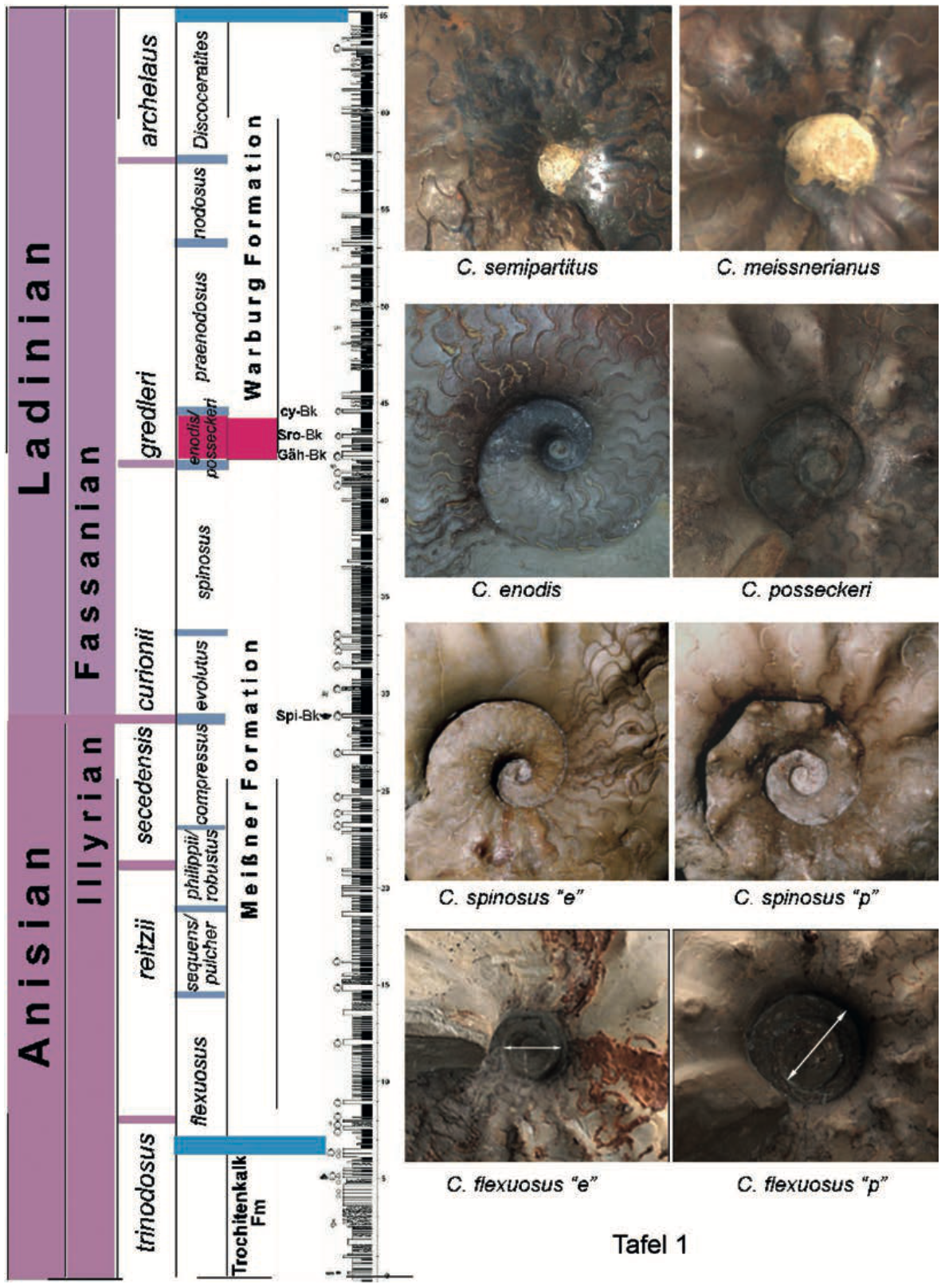
The evolution of the biospecies Ceratites nodosus. Five million years of a dimorphic biospecies Ceratites nodosus. Source: Siegfried Rein (2020): The Muschelkalk cephalopod collection of the Natural History Museum of Erfurt and its significance for Muschelkalk research; VERNATE 39, p. 28**

Siegfried Rein (b. 1 August 1936 in Warnsdorf; d. 2 December [2020) was a German paleontologist from Thüringen.

== Life ==
Rein worked as a teacher and lived in Erfurt, where he was associated with the Natural History Museum of Erfurt as an independent collaborator and was responsible for the museum's Muschelkalk collection.

He specialised in the ammonites of the Upper Muschelkalk, especially Ceratites, with a focus on their systematics and paleobiology. Drawing on statistical analysis of large fossil assemblages, often numbering in the hundreds within populations or biozones, he argued for a fundamental revision of ceratite taxonomy. In his view, earlier literature had relied too heavily on morphology alone and had therefore introduced too many separate species and genera.

He examined this question in particular through the example of Ceratites nodosus, which he interpreted as a lineage that migrated from the Tethys into the shallower and less favourable conditions of the Muschelkalk Sea and developed considerable morphological variation in response to changing ecological conditions. Forms that had often been described in the literature as distinct species were instead treated by Rein as belonging to a single species. Within this framework he consistently distinguished an E-form and a P-form, which he interpreted as sexual dimorphism. Max Urlichs, by contrast, retained a more classical morphological species concept and in 2006 proposed two separate evolutionary lineages.

Like the engineer and amateur paleontologist Klaus Ebel, Rein also argued that ammonites were not freely floating animals and could only swim to a limited extent, instead living close to the sea floor. He saw supporting evidence in the fossil record of frequent epizoan overgrowth on ceratites without any visible compensatory increase in chamber volume, unlike the condition in Nautilus.

In 1998 he received the Zittel Medal. He was also active in the Trias-Verein Erfurt.

Rein also edited the writings of Friedrich Christian Lesser and published a biographical work on him.

== Taxa described ==
- Parapinacoceras thiemei Rein & Werneburg, 2010
- Gymnites brunzeli Rein & Werneburg, 2010
- Sturia brandti Rein, 2019

== Selected writings ==
- Rein, S. (1988): Die Ceratiten der pulcher/robustus-Zone Thüringens. Publications of the Natural History Museum Schleusingen 3: 28–38.
- Rein, S. (1993): Zur Biologie und Lebensweise der germanischen Ceratiten. In: Muschelkalk. Schöntaler Symposium 1991. Goldschneck Verlag, pp. 279–284.
- Rein, S. (1996): Zur Phylogenie der germanischen Ceratiten. Publications of the Natural History Museum of Erfurt 15: 15–24.
- Rein, S. (1996): Über Epöken und das Schwimmvermögen von Ceratiten. Publications of the Natural History Museum Schleusingen 11: 65–75.
- Rein, S. (1997): Biologie und Lebensweise von Germanonautilus Mojsisovics 1902, Part 1. Publications of the Natural History Museum Schleusingen 12: 43–51.
- Rein, S. (1997): Über Wachstum und Lebensalter der Ceratiten. Publications of the Natural History Museum of Erfurt 16: 197–206.
- Rein, S. (1999): Über Ceratites armatus PHIL. und Ceratites münsteri PHIL. aus dem Oberen Muschelkalk Thüringens. Publications of the Natural History Museum Schleusingen 14: 43–51.
- Rein, S. (1999): Die Cephalopoden des Oberen Muschelkalkes (Mittlere Trias) und das Archimedische Prinzip. Publications of the Natural History Museum of Erfurt 18: 57–64.
- Rein, S. (2003–2004): Zur Biologie der Ceratiten der Spinosus-Zone – Ergebnisse einer Populationsanalyse. Publications of the Natural History Museum of Erfurt 22: 29–50; 23: 33–50.
- Rein, S. (2006): Zur Biologie der Ceratiten der compressus-Zone – Ergebnisse einer Populationsanalyse. Publications of the Natural History Museum of Erfurt 25: 47–68.
- Rein, S. (2007): Die Evolution der Biospezies „Ceratites nodosus“. Vom typologischen Art-Konzept zum Biospezies-Konzept. Contributions to the Geology of Thuringia, New Series 14: 85–112.
