= Natural History Museum of Erfurt =

Museum in Germany

Coordinates: 50.977°N 11.026°E

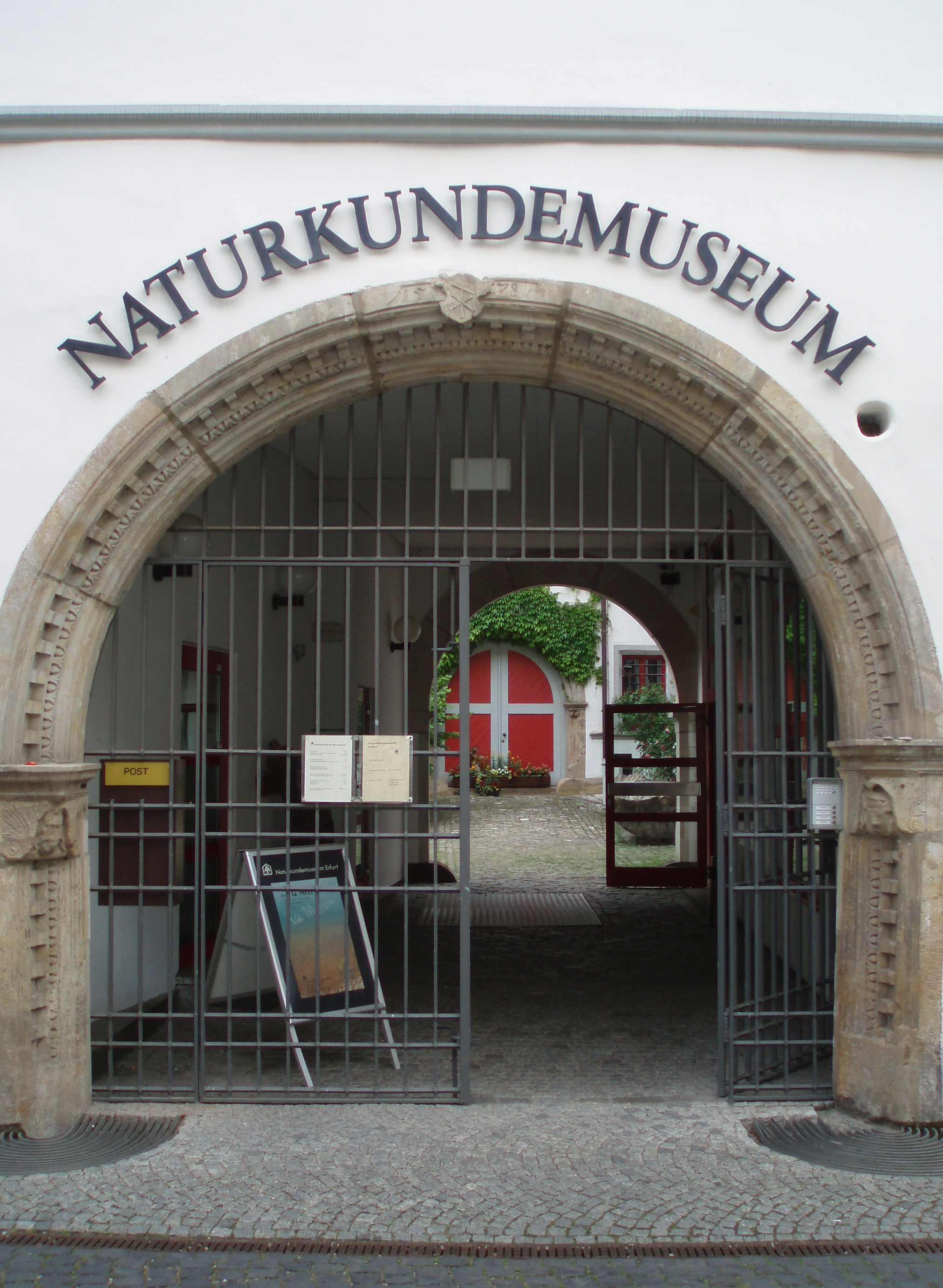
Naturkundemuseum Erfurt (entrance).

Natural History Museum of Erfurt, Thuringia

The Natural History Museum of Erfurt (German: Naturkundemuseum Erfurt) is a natural history museum in Erfurt, Germany.

The museum has a permanent exhibition relating the natural history of the forests, fields, city and the geological history of Thuringia. There is also a special exhibitions programme. The museum has collections of botany, zoology, mineralogy — 6,500 specimens presented by Godehard Schwethelm (1899–1992) — and palaeontology. The statutory goals of the museum are the promotion of scientific research and education, the care of scientific collections and hosting scientific meetings.

== See also ==
- List of museums in Germany
- List of natural history museums
