= 169th Infantry Division (Wehrmacht) =

- 169. Infanterie-Division
- 169th Infanterie Division Vehicle Insignia
- Active: 1939–45
- Country: Nazi Germany
- Branch: Army
- Type: Infantry
- Size: Division
- Engagements: World War II

The 169th Infantry Division (German: 169. Infanterie-Division) was a German infantry division during World War II.

== History ==
The division was formed in 1939. It took part in Operation Fall Gelb and stayed in France until being transferred to Finnish Lapland in 1941. The division was part of the German XXXVI Corps which also included SS Division Nord and the Finnish 6th Division. On 1 July the corps began its attack which was aimed at Kandalaksha on the White Sea coast. The division crossed the Finnish-Soviet Border just north of Salla. During the heavy fighting against the Soviet 122nd Division the SS Division Nord broke and fled. On 8 July the 169th occupied Salla. With the help of the Finnish 6th Division the Soviets were pushed back beyond the pre-Winter War borders.

In September the division had advanced to the River Verman (Vermanjoki), here the offensive finally stalled. During autumn 1941 AOK Norwegen decided to shifts its attack to the area held by the Finnish 3rd Division. The 169th Division stayed in the area around Salla until the beginning of hostilities between Finland and Germany in 1944. During 1944 the division withdrew back to Norway, then was transferred to Germany where it fought out the final few weeks of the war.

== Commanders ==
- Generalleutnant Philipp Müller-Gebhard (29 November 1939 - 1 December 1939)
- Generalleutnant Heinrich Kirchheim (1 December 1939 - 1 February 1941)
- Generalleutnant Kurt Dittmar (1 February 1941 - 29 September 1941)
- Generalleutnant Hermann Tittel (29 September 1941 - 22 June 1943)
- Generalleutnant Georg Radziej (22 June 1943 - N/A)

== See also ==
- Continuation War
- German XXXVI Mountain Corps
- Division (military), Military unit, List of German divisions in World War II
- Heer, Wehrmacht
