= Georg Radziej =

- Born: 7 January 1895; Preiskretscham
- Died: 13 May 1972 (aged 77)
- Military career
- Allegiance: Nazi Germany
- Branch: Army (Wehrmacht)
- Rank: Generalleutnant
- Commands: 169. Infanterie-Division
- Conflicts: World War II
- Awards: Knight's Cross of the Iron Cross (?)

Georg Radziej (7 January 1895 – 13 May 1972) was a German general during World War II. He may have been a recipient of the Knight's Cross of the Iron Cross of Nazi Germany.

== Awards and decorations ==
- Knight's Cross of the Iron Cross on 9 May 1945 as Generalleutnant and commander of the 169. Infanterie-Division (Note: Georg Radziej's teleprinter nomination, without the compulsory reasoning, by the troop was received by the at the time relocating 1st echelon of the Heerespersonalamt (HPA—Army Staff Office) on 20 April 1945. More detail regarding the nomination was promised in the teleprinter message which was never sent or was lost. Radziej was not listed in the nomination book nor was a file card created. A presentation cannot be verified According to the Association of Knight's Cross Recipients (AKCR) the award was presented in accordance with the Dönitz-decree. This is illegal according to the Deutsche Dienststelle (WASt) and lacks legal justification. The presentation date was assigned by Walther-Peer Fellgiebel.)

== Notes ==
Military offices
Preceded by Generalleutnant Hermann Tittel	Commander of 169. Infanterie-Division; 22 June 1943 - 8 May 1945	Succeeded by None
