= Joseph von Radowitz (general) =

German general (1899–1956)

- Born: 29 July 1899; Frankfurt am Main
- Died: 1 June 1956 (aged 56); Bad Wiessee
- Military career
- Allegiance: German Empire; Weimar Republic; Nazi Germany; West Germany
- Branch: Imperial German Army; Reichswehr; German Army; Bundeswehr
- Service years: 1917–1919; 1924–1935; 1935–1945; 1955–1956
- Rank: Generalleutnant; Generalmajor
- Commands: 23d Panzer Division
- Conflicts: World War I World War II
- Awards: Knight's Cross of the Iron Cross with Oak Leaves

Joseph von Radowitz (29 July 1899 – 31 May 1956) was a German general during World War II who may have been a recipient of the Knight's Cross of the Iron Cross with Oak Leaves. Radowitz joined the Bundeswehr in 1950s.

== Awards and decorations ==
- Iron Cross (1914) 2nd Class (1917)
- Clasp to the Iron Cross (1939) 2nd Class (6 October 1939) & 1st Class (26 June 1940)
- German Cross in Gold on 29 February 1944 as Oberst in Panzergrenadier-Regiment 28
- Knight's Cross of the Iron Cross with Oak Leaves
  - Knight's Cross on 17 September 1944 as Oberst and leader of the 23. Panzer-Division
  - (882nd) Oak Leaves on 9 May 1945 as Generalleutnant and commander of 23. Panzer-Division

Radowitz's nomination for the Oak Leaves was received by the Heerespersonalamt (HPA—Army Staff Office) from the troop on 30 April 1945 and approved by all intermittent commanding officers. Major Joachim Domaschk ruled that the nomination was insufficient and disapproved on 1 May and recommended "Decision by Chief of OKW". The file contains no indication whether this decision was ever taken. A teleprinter message was sent on 2 May to the nominating unit, the cavalry corps, and further messages to the commanding officers of the Panzer AOK 2 and Heeresgruppe Süd: "...was disapproved because ... the Führer criteria for the presentation guidelines have not been met. I.A. signed Maisel" The sequential number "882" was assigned by the Association of Knight's Cross Recipients (AKCR), the presentation date by Fellgiebel.

Military offices
Preceded by Generalmajor Ewald Kräber	Commander of 23. Panzer-Division; 9 June 1944 1944 – 8 May 1945	Succeeded by Unit disbanded
