= Ernst Maisel =

German general (1896–1978)

- Born: 16 September 1896; Landau
- Died: 16 December 1978 (aged 82); Schönau am Königsee
- Military career
- Allegiance: German Empire; Weimar Republic; Nazi Germany
- Branch: Army
- Rank: Generalleutnant
- Conflicts: World War I; World War II
- Awards: Knight's Cross of the Iron Cross

Generalleutnant Ernst Maisel (16 September 1896 – 16 December 1978) was a German Heer general in the Wehrmacht of Nazi Germany during World War II, known for his complicity in the forced suicide of Erwin Rommel.

== Background ==
As a Generalmajor he was Chief of the Office Group for Officers' Education and Welfare of the Army Personnel Office. One of his responsibilities in this appointment was to be court protocol officer of the Army court of honour that investigated army officers suspected of involvement in the 20 July plot. In this capacity on 14 October 1944 he arrived with General Wilhelm Burgdorf at the home of Field Marshal Erwin Rommel. Burgdorf had been instructed by Field Marshal Wilhelm Keitel to offer Rommel three choices: report to Hitler to exculpate himself; admit guilt, take poison, receive a state funeral, and obtain immunity for his family; or face a treason trial. Rommel drove away with Burgdorf and Maisel and committed suicide shortly thereafter.

In the last days of the war, Maisel was appointed commander the 68th Infantry Division with the rank of Generalleutnant. He was taken into captivity by the Americans on 7 May 1945, was released in March 1947 and died aged 82 in 1978.

== Awards ==
- Knight's Cross of the Iron Cross on 6 April 1942 as Oberst and commander of the Infanterie-Regiment 42
