= Heinrich Prinz zu Sayn-Wittgenstein =

German officer and fighter pilot during World War II

- Born: 14 August 1916; Copenhagen, Denmark
- Died: 21 January 1944 (aged 27); Lübars, Free State of Prussia, Nazi Germany
- Cause of death: Killed in action
- Burial place: Ysselsteyn German war cemetery, Netherlands (re-interred)
- Military career
- Allegiance: Nazi Germany
- Branch: Luftwaffe
- Service years: 1937–1944
- Rank: Major (major)
- Nickname: Heinz
- Units: KG 1, KG 51, NJG 2, NJG 3, NJG 5
- Commands: IV./NJG 5, II./NJG 3, II./NJG 2, NJG 2
- Conflicts: World War II: Battle of France; Battle of Britain; Operation Barbarossa; Defense of the Reich †
- Awards: Knight's Cross of the Iron Cross with Oak Leaves and Swords

Heinrich Prinz zu Sayn-Wittgenstein-Sayn (14 August 1916 – 21 January 1944) was a German night fighter pilot and flying ace during World War II. At the time of his death, Sayn-Wittgenstein was the highest-scoring night fighter pilot in the Luftwaffe and still the third highest by the end of World War II, with 83 aerial victories to his credit.

Born on 14 August 1916 in Copenhagen, Denmark, Prinz zu Sayn-Wittgenstein-Sayn joined the cavalry of the German Wehrmacht in spring of 1937. He was accepted for flight training and transferred to the emerging Luftwaffe. He initially served as an observer and then as a pilot in Kampfgeschwader 1 (KG 1) Hindenburg and Kampfgeschwader 51 (KG 51) Edelweiss. He saw action with these units in the Battle of France, Battle of Britain, and Operation Barbarossa, the German invasion of the Soviet Union, before he transferred to the night fighter force. He claimed his first aerial victory on the night of 6/7 May 1942. By October 1942, he had accumulated 22 aerial victories, for which he was awarded the Knight's Cross of the Iron Cross on 7 October 1942. He received the Knight's Cross of the Iron Cross with Oak Leaves on 31 August 1943, for 54 aerial victories.

Prinz zu Sayn-Wittgenstein was appointed to command Nachtjagdgeschwader 2 (NJG 2) in January 1944, and was killed in action on the night of 21 January 1944. Posthumously he was awarded the Knight's Cross of the Iron Cross with Oak Leaves and Swords.

== Personal life ==
Heinrich Prinz zu Sayn-Wittgenstein-Sayn was born on 14 August 1916 in Copenhagen, Denmark, as a member of the aristocratic family Sayn-Wittgenstein. He was the second of three sons of Prince Gustav Alexander zu Sayn-Wittgenstein-Sayn (1880–1953), a diplomat at the German embassy in Copenhagen, and his wife, Walburga, Baroness von Friesen (1885–1970). His brother Ludwig was older and Alexander younger. Sayn-Wittgenstein was a descendant of German officer and Russian field marshal Prince Ludwig Adolph Peter, Prince zu Sayn-Wittgenstein-Berleburg-Ludwigsburg, a prominent commander in the Imperial Russian Army during the German campaign at the Battle of Leipzig.

Sayn-Wittgenstein attended numerous schools in various locations, including a private tutor at Lake Geneva, a boarding school in Neubeuern in Upper Bavaria, a brief stay at Davos in Switzerland, and a private school in Montreux. He received his Abitur from the Realgymnasium, a higher education facility, in Freiburg im Breisgau on 17 December 1935. He joined the Hitler Youth on 12 April 1932 in Freiburg. On 15 January 1933, he became a Kameradschaftsführer (group leader). From Easter 1933 until fall of 1933 he led the group's military-sports activities as a Wehrsportleiter. He then became head of the instruction unit until May 1934. From June 1934 he led the work unit 2/1/113 and received further pre-military sports training at the different camps of the unit 113 and at the Regional Leaders' School.

== Military career ==
In April 1937, Sayn-Wittgenstein decided on a military career and joined the 17. Kavallerie-Regiment (17th Cavalry Regiment) in Bamberg. He transferred to the Luftwaffe in the summer of 1937 and, in October, he was accepted at the flight training school in Braunschweig. He received his officer's commission and was promoted to Leutnant (second lieutenant) in June 1938. Sayn-Wittgenstein served on various air bases from where he flew the Junkers Ju 88 and the Heinkel He 111. In the winter of 1938–39 he served as a Kampfbeobachter (combat observer or navigator) in Kampfgeschwader 54 (KG 54—54th Bomber Wing) based at Fritzlar. (Note: For an explanation of Luftwaffe unit designations, see Organisation of the Luftwaffe during World War II.)

=== With the bomber arm ===
After the outbreak of World War II on 1 September 1939, Sayn-Wittgenstein experienced his first combat action on the Western Front in the Battle of France and, later, during the Battle of Britain. Initially he served as an observer on the He 111 H-3 from Kampfgeschwader 1 "Hindenburg," piloted by Gerhard Baeker, with whom he flew high-altitude missions against the Royal Air Force (RAF) airfield at Biggin Hill.

In the winter of 1940–41, Sayn-Wittgenstein returned to pilot school and took his Luftwaffe Advanced Pilot's Certificate 2 (Erweiterter Luftwaffen-Flugzeugführerschein 2), also known as 'C2'-Certificate, confirming proficiency in blind-flying, a prerequisite for night duty, and returned to a combat unit in March 1941. In preparation for Operation Barbarossa, the German invasion of the Soviet Union, his unit moved to Eichwalde in East Prussia. In support of Heeresgruppe Nord (Army Group North), KG 1 flew its first missions against Liepāja and then Jelgava and Riga, targeting the heavily occupied enemy airfields.

In August 1941, Sayn-Wittgenstein transferred to the night fighter force. By this time, he had flown 150 combat missions and was awarded both classes of the Iron Cross (Eisernes Kreuz), Honor Goblet of the Luftwaffe (Ehrenpokal der Luftwaffe) and the Front Flying Clasp of the Luftwaffe for Bomber crews in Gold (Frontflugspange für Kampfflieger in Gold).

=== Night fighter operations ===
A map of part of the Kammhuber Line. The 'belt' and night fighter 'boxes' are shown.

Following the 1939 aerial Battle of the Heligoland Bight, bombing missions by the RAF shifted to the cover of darkness, initiating the Defence of the Reich campaign. By mid-1940, Generalmajor (Brigadier General) Josef Kammhuber had established a night air defense system dubbed the Kammhuber Line. It consisted of a series of control sectors equipped with radars and searchlights and an associated night fighter. Each sector, named a Himmelbett (canopy bed), would direct the night fighter into visual range with target bombers. In 1941, the Luftwaffe started equipping night fighters with airborne radar such as the Lichtenstein radar. This airborne radar did not come into general use until early 1942.

Sayn-Wittgenstein had left KG 51 by January 1942, after he had volunteered for the night fighter force and been appointed Staffelkapitän (squadron leader) of the 9./Nachtjagdgeschwader 2 (9./NJG 2—9th Squadron of the 2nd Night Fighter Wing) on 1 November 1941. He claimed his first nocturnal victory—a Bristol Blenheim 40 kilometers (25 mi) west of Walcheren—on the night of 6 May 1942, while serving with the Ergänzungsgruppe (Supplementary Group) of NJG 2. He shot down three aircraft in both the nights of 31 July 1942 (victories 15–17) and 10 September 1942 (victories 19–21). Sayn-Wittgenstein received the Knight's Cross of the Iron Cross (Ritterkreuz des Eisernen Kreuzes) on 7 October 1942, after 22 aerial victories. The award was presented by General Josef Kammhuber, after which they both inspected the personnel of 9./NJG 2.

Hauptmann (captain) Sayn-Wittgenstein was moved to the Eastern Front in February 1943 after he had been appointed Gruppenkommandeur (group commander) of the IV./Nachtjagdgeschwader 5 (IV./NJG 5—4th Squadron of the 5th Night Fighter Wing) on 1 December 1942. Here Unteroffizier Herbert Kümmritz joined Sayn-Wittgenstein's crew as his radio and wireless operator (Bordfunker). Kümmritz at this time already had six months of operation experience on board a Messerschmitt Bf 110 serving with the II./Nachtjagdgeschwader 3 (II./NJG 3—2nd Squadron of the 3rd Night Fighter Wing) stationed at Stade. Kümmeritz had studied high frequency technology at the Telefunken Company in Berlin before World War II. Prior to Kümmeritz, Sayn-Wittgenstein had rejected all his previous radio operators after only a few missions. In March and April 1943, Kammhuber ordered IV./NJG 5 to relocate to Rennes, France in defense of the German U-boat bases.

Stationed at Gilze-Rijen the order was issued to convert to the Bf 110 night fighter. Sayn-Wittgenstein flew the Bf 110 for one short flight only, but on the night of 24 June 1943, the aircraft had technical problems and was considered unserviceable. Kümmeritz and Sayn-Wittgenstein took off in their usual Ju 88 C and shot down four Avro Lancaster bombers (victories 32–35). Sayn-Wittgenstein never flew another Bf 110 again, preferring his Ju 88 to the Bf 110. The group was relocated to the Eastern Front again and redesignated as I./Nachtjagdgeschwader 100 (I./NJG 100—1st Squadron of the 100th Night Fighter Wing) on 1 August 1943. While stationed at Insterburg, East Prussia, Sayn-Wittgenstein shot down seven aircraft on one day, six of them within 47 minutes (victories 36–41), in the area north-east of Oryol on 20 July 1943, making him an "ace-in-a-day".

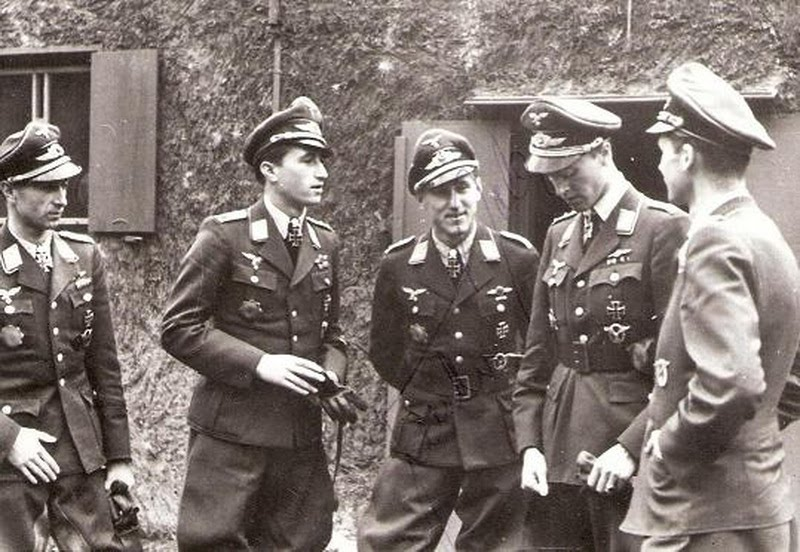
Grasser, Nowotny, Rall, Prinz zu Sayn-Wittgenstein (2nd right) at Rastenburg

Sayn-Wittgenstein claimed three more victories on 1 August 1943 (victories 44–46) and three more on the night of 3 August 1943 (victories 48–50). He was appointed Gruppenkommandeur of the II./NJG 3 on 15 August 1943. Sayn-Wittgenstein became the 290th recipient of the Knight's Cross of the Iron Cross with Oak Leaves (Ritterkreuz des Eisernen Kreuzes mit Eichenlaub) after 54 aerial victories on 31 August 1943. The award was presented at the Führerhauptquartier in East Prussia on 22 September 1943. Three other Luftwaffe officers were presented with awards that day by Hitler, Hauptmann Günther Rall and Hauptmann Walter Nowotny were awarded the Swords to their Knight's Cross with Oak Leaves, and Major Hartmann Grasser also received the Knight's Cross with Oak Leaves. For these achievements he also received a letter from the commanding general of the 4. Jagd-Division (4th Fighter Division) Generalleutnant (lieutenant general) Joachim-Friedrich Huth.

On 1 December 1943, Sayn-Wittgenstein was ordered to take over command of the II./Nachtjagdgeschwader 2 (II./NJG 2—2nd Group of the 2nd Night Fighter Wing). In consequence, he was replaced by Hauptmann Paul Szameitat as commander II./NJG 3. On 1 January 1944, Sayn-Wittgenstein was appointed Geschwaderkommodore (wing commander) of NJG 2 he had already reached 68 aerial victories. He claimed six four-engined bombers shot down on the same night (victories 69–74). In late 1943, his wireless operator Kümmeritz went on study leave and was replaced by Feldwebel (warrant officer) Friedrich Ostheimer, who flew with Sayn-Wittgenstein from October 1943 until January 1944. He was succeeded by Major Paul Semrau as command of the II./NJG 2.

On the night of 20 January 1944 Sayn-Wittgenstein claimed three enemy aircraft shot down in the Berlin area (victories 76–78). He almost collided with the third burning Lancaster which went into a dive and came very close to his own Ju 88. The Ju 88 went out of control and Sayn-Wittgenstein regained control of his just-flyable aircraft. His radio operator on this mission, Feldwebel Friedrich Ostheimer, established contact with the airfield at Erfurt. Since the aircraft began stalling after the wheels and flaps went down the crew decided to belly-land the aircraft. They discovered that about 2 meters (6.6 ft) of the wing had been cut off by the Lancaster's propeller.

=== Death ===
The next day, 21 January 1944, Sayn-Wittgenstein, wireless operator Ostheimer and mechanic Unteroffizier Kurt Matzuleit took off on a Zahme Sau (Tame Boar), a combination of ground controlled and airborne radar, night fighter intercept mission flying the Ju 88 R4+XM (Werknummer 750 467—factory number), which normally was assigned to the Technical Officer of NJG 2. At 22:00 contact with the first of five Lancasters was established; the aircraft was shot down, and was observed to explode at 22:05. Between 22:10 and 22:15 the second Lancaster was shot down. Observers reported the third Lancaster exploded at approximately 22:30, followed shortly by number four, which hit the ground at 22:40. During the fifth and final attack, the four-engined bomber was burning when Sayn-Wittgenstein's Ju 88 came under attack, presumably from British fighter escorts. In the attack, their left wing caught fire. Sayn-Wittgenstein ordered his crew to jump, and Ostheimer and Matzuleit parachuted to safety from the damaged aircraft.

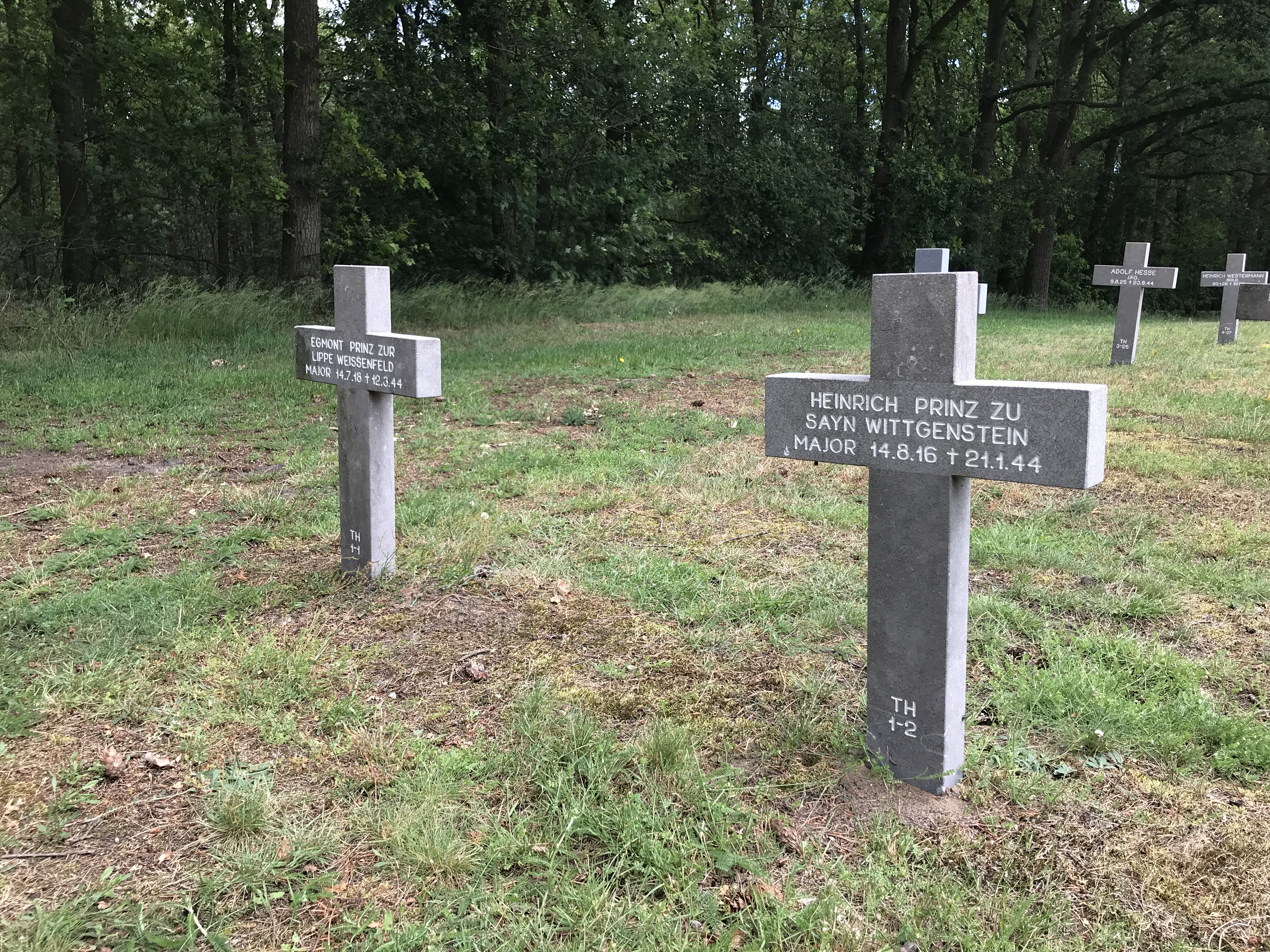
German War Cemetery Ysselsteyn - Heinrich Prinz zu Sayn-Wittgenstein-Sayn

The next day, Sayn-Wittgenstein's body was found near the wreckage of the Ju 88 in a forest area belonging to the municipality of Lübars by Stendal. His parachute was discovered unopened and it was deduced that he may have hit his head on the vertical stabilizer of his aircraft when trying to escape. The death certificate listed "closed fracture of the skull and facial bone" as his cause of death. He was posthumously awarded the 44th Knight's Cross of the Iron Cross with Oak Leaves and Swords (Ritterkreuz des Eisernen Kreuzes mit Eichenlaub und Schwertern) on 23 January 1944. Heinrich Prinz zu Sayn-Wittgenstein had flown 320 combat missions, 150 of which as a bomber pilot or observer. At the time of his death he was the leading night fighter pilot with 83 aerial victories, with 33 of them claimed on the Eastern and 50 on the Western Front.

On 25 January 1944, Sayn-Wittgenstein's death was announced in the Wehrmachtbericht, an information bulletin issued by the headquarters of the Wehrmacht. He was buried on 29 January 1944 in the Geschwader cemetery at the Deelen Air Base. His remains were re-interred in 1948. He is now resting next to Prinz Egmont zur Lippe-Weißenfeld at the Ysselsteyn German war cemetery in the Netherlands.

=== Who shot down Sayn-Wittgenstein? ===
The question of who shot down Sayn-Wittgenstein is unanswered. Friedrich Ostheimer remained convinced that his aircraft was shot down by a long-range intruder de Havilland Mosquito night fighter. However, no Mosquito pilot claimed an aerial victory that night. A closer analysis reveals that three Mosquitos, two Serrate-equipped aircraft from No. 141 Squadron RAF and one from No. 239 Squadron RAF, participated in the attacks on Magdeburg. Only one Mosquito had enemy contact: No. 141 Squadron's Mosquito F.II, DZ303, piloted by Pilot Officer Desmond Snape with Flying Officer I. Fowler as his radar operator reported radar contact at 23:15 south of Brandenburg. After three to four minutes of pursuit they encountered a Ju 88 with its position lights on. They attacked the Ju 88 and believed to have damaged it behind its cockpit, but they did not claim a victory. This encounter, according to the author Peter Hinchliffe and Martin Bowman, exactly matches the time and area in which Sayn-Wittgenstein was killed.

The wreck location at Stendal, and the site of Ostheimer's parachute landing at Schönhausen, which both lie on the bombers' approach route to Magdeburg, are more than 30 miles (48 kilometres) from the area where Snape and Fowler reported their contact. It is also likely that Sayn-Wittgenstein was shot down only a few minutes after his last victory at 22:40, while Snape and Fowler claimed their Ju 88 damaged (not destroyed) over half an hour later. Sayn-Wittgenstein was in the bomber stream, where Mosquito fighters did not venture because the bombers would fire on any twin-engined aircraft, and he would not have had his navigation lights illuminated. Historians Alfred Price and Martin Middlebrook have both suggested that Sayn-Wittgenstein was shot down by a bomber. Three RAF bomber crews returning from the raid filed claims for German night fighters shot down. Two claimed Ju 88s in the vicinity of Magdeburg and one claimed a Bf 110. These claims appear to be in line with German records which show the Luftwaffe lost two Ju 88s, one Bf 110 and one Heinkel He 219 that night. The He 219 was that of Hauptmann Manfred Meurer, credited with 65 victories, who apparently collided with his final victim, a Lancaster. The wrecks of the two aircraft were found locked together and there were no survivors from either crew. One of the bomber crews claiming a Ju 88 shot down near Magdeburg was a Pathfinder Lancaster crew from No. 156 Squadron RAF. Their tail gunner, Flight Lieutenant T.R. Thomson from Edinburgh, fired on a Ju 88 at close range during its second approach and saw it go down. Ostheimer's account states that Sayn-Wittgenstein was attacking a Lancaster at the time and was shot down on his second approach.

== Personality ==
Night fighter pilot Wilhelm Johnen commented on the arrival of Sayn-Wittgenstein at his unit: "... A madman, I thought, as I took my leave. Once outside I got into conversation with the Prince's crew. Among other things they told me that their princely coachman had recently made his radio operator stand to attention in the plane and confined him to his quarters for three days because he (the radio operator) had lost his screen [radar contact with the enemy] during a mission."

Herbert Kümmeritz recalled that Sayn-Wittgenstein often used his seniority and rank to ensure that he would get the best initial contact with the incoming bombers. He would often wait on the ground until the best contact was established. If another fighter had already engaged the enemy before Wittgenstein arrived, the prince would announce on the radio "Hier Wittgenstein—geh weg!" (Wittgenstein here, clear off!)

Wolfgang Falck felt that Sayn-Wittgenstein was not officer-material. Falck described him as: "...not the type to be a leader of a unit. He was not a teacher, educator or instructor. But he was an outstanding personality, magnificent fighter and great operational pilot. He had an astonishing sixth sense—an intuition that permitted him to see and even feel where other aircraft were. It was like a personal radar system. He was an excellent air-to-air shot."

His mother, Princess Walburga, commented that: "... he was boundlessly disillusioned and boundlessly disappointed. In 1943 he contemplated the thought of shooting Hitler. It was only out of sense of honor and duty that Heinrich went on fighting, carried along by the ambition to overtake Major Lent in his score of enemy aircraft shot down". In her memoirs, Tatiana von Metternich reported that Wittgenstein planned to kill Hitler after the ceremony at which he received his Knight's Cross of the Iron Cross in 1943. He said, "I am not married, I have no children—I am expendable. He will receive me personally. Who else among us can ever get as near to him?"

== Summary of career ==
=== Aerial victory claims ===
Sayn-Wittgenstein was credited with 83 nocturnal aerial victories, claimed in 320 combat missions, including 150 with bomber arm. His 83 aerial victories include 33 shot down on the Eastern Front. Spick also list him with 83 aerial victories claimed in an unknown number of aerial victories. Boiten lists him with 81 confirmed plus one further unconfirmed aerial victory. Foreman, Mathews and Parry, authors of Luftwaffe Night Fighter Claims 1939 – 1945, list 79 nocturnal victory claims, numerically ranging from 1 to 75, 81, 82, and 79. Mathews and Foreman also published Luftwaffe Aces — Biographies and Victory Claims, also listing Sayn-Wittgenstein with 79 claims, plus one further unconfirmed claim. This figure includes 33 aerial victories on the Eastern Front.

Victory claims were logged to a map-reference (PQ = Planquadrat), for example "PQ HJ-44". The Luftwaffe grid map (Jägermeldenetz) covered all of Europe, western Russia and North Africa and was composed of rectangles measuring 15 minutes of latitude by 30 minutes of longitude, an area of about 360 square miles (930 km^{2}). These sectors were then subdivided into 36 smaller units to give a location area 3 km × 4 km (1.9 mi × 2.5 mi) in size.

Chronicle of aerial victories
This and the ♠ (Ace of spades) indicates those aerial victories which made Sayn-Wittgenstein an "ace-in-a-day", a term which designates a fighter pilot who has shot down five or more airplanes in a single day. This and the – (dash) indicates unwitnessed aerial victory claims for which Sayn-Wittgenstein did not receive credit. This and the ? (question mark) indicates discrepancies between Luftwaffe Night Fighter Claims 1939 – 1945 and Luftwaffe Aces — Biographies and Victory Claims.
| Claim | Date | Time | Type | Location | Serial No./Squadron No. |
– Ergänzungsgruppe of Nachtjagdgeschwader 2 –
| 1 | 7 May 1942 | 01:20 | Blenheim | 40 km (25 mi) west of Walcheren | Blenheim V6382/No. 18 Squadron RAF |
| 2 | 31 May 1942 | 01:16 | Wellington | North Sea | |
| 3 | 31 May 1942 | 01:36 | Manchester | North Sea | |
| 4 | 2 June 1942 | 00:43 | Halifax | Bossut/Grez-Doiceau | |
| 5 | 6 June 1942 | 01:16 | Wellington | | |
| 6 | 6 June 1942 | 01:50 | Wellington | | |
| 7 | 9 June 1942 | 03:05 | Wellington | Anna Jacobapolder | Wellington Z1573/No. 75 (New Zealand) Squadron RAF |
| 8 | 17 June 1942 | 03:09 | B-24 | 20 km (12 mi) northwest of Leiden | |
| 9 | 17 June 1942 | 03:23 | Wellington | 15 km (9.3 mi) north-northwest of Leiden | Wellington X3723/No. 419 Bomber Squadron RCAF |
| 10 | 26 June 1942 | 03:07 | Wellington | | |
| 11 | 30 June 1942 | 03:26 | Wellington | | |
– 9. Staffel of Nachtjagdgeschwader 2 –
| 12 | 3 July 1942 | 03:05 | Stirling | over sea, 50 km (31 mi) west of Rotterdam | |
| 13 | 24 July 1942 | 03:10 | Lancaster | over sea, 30 km (19 mi) west of Scheveningen | |
| 14 | 29 July 1942 | 01:11 | Fulmar | North Sea | |
| 15 | 1 August 1942 | 03:17 | Hampden | Oisterwijk/Moergestel | Hampden N9062/No. 14 Operational Training Unit RAF |
| 16 | 1 August 1942 | 03:30 | Halifax | Scheldt Estuary | |
| 17 | 1 August 1942 | 04:42 | Wellington | | |
| 18 | 7 August 1942 | 04:15 | Halifax | over sea, 10 km (6.2 mi) west of Hook of Holland | Halifax W1237/No. 78 Squadron RAF |
| 19 | 10 September 1942 | 23:15 | Stirling | 12 km (7.5 mi) south of Rotterdam | |
| 20 | 10 September 1942 | 23:50 | Halifax | Ooltgensplaat | |
| 21 | 10 September 1942 | 23:54 | B-24 | 10 km (6.2 mi) east of Schouwen-Duiveland | |
| 22 | 16 September 1942 | 22:52 | Stirling | over sea, 3 km (1.9 mi) west of Noordwijk/Katwijk aan den Rijn | |
– Stab IV. Gruppe of Nachtjagdgeschwader 5 –
| 23 | 16 April 1943 | 23:13 | DB-3 | Eastern Front | |
| 24 | 16 April 1943 | 23:15 | DB-3 | Eastern Front | |
| 25 | 22 April 1943 | 23:25 | DB-3 | Eastern Front | |
| 26 | 23 April 1943 | 00:30 | B-25 | Eastern Front | |
| 27 | 2 May 1943 | 22:37 | DB-3 | southwest of Eydtkau, present-day Chernyshevskoye | |
– 1. Staffel of Nachtjagdgeschwader 1 –
| 28 | 23 June 1943 | 02:09 | Stirling | over sea, 50 km (31 mi) northwest of Hook of Holland | Stirling BF572/No. 218 (Gold Coast) Squadron RAF |
| 29 | 25 June 1943 | 02:25 | Lancaster | 30 km (19 mi) west of Katwijk aan Zee | Lancaster LM327/No. 97 Squadron RAF |
| 30 | 25 June 1943 | 02:50 | Stirling | 40 km (25 mi) west of Scheveningen | Stirling EF392/No. 7 Squadron RAF |
| 31 | 25 June 1943 | 03:09 | Stirling | 20 km (12 mi) west of Katwijk aan Zee | |
| 32 | 25 June 1943 | 03:35 | Wellington | PQ HJ-44 | |
– Stab IV. Gruppe of Nachtjagdgeschwader 5 –
| 33 | 11 July 1943 | 21:50 | DB-3 | Eastern Front | |
| 34 | 14 July 1943 | 21:47 | DB-3 | east of Etrada | |
| 35 | 14 July 1943 | 22:05 | TB-7 | west of Poldsow | |
| 36 | 17 July 1943 | 21:26? (Note: According to Luftwaffe Aces — Biographies and Victory Claims claimed at 21:24.) | DB-3 | 30 km (19 mi) northeast of Oryol | |
| 37 | 18 July 1943 | 21:39 | B-25 | Eastern Front | |
| 38 | 18 July 1943 | 21:47 | DB-3 | Eastern Front | |
| 39 | 19 July 1943 | 21:10 | DB-3 | north of Oryol | |
| 40 | 19 July 1943 | 21:20 | Boston | north of Oryol | |
| 41 | 19 July 1943 | 22:10 | DB-3 | north of Oryol | |
| 42♠ | 20 July 1943 | 01:30 | DB-3 | north of Oryol | |
| 43♠ | 20 July 1943 | 21:08 | DB-3 | 15 km (9.3 mi) northeast of Oryol | |
| 44♠ | 20 July 1943 | 21:15 | B-25 | 10 km (6.2 mi) northeast of Oryol | |
| 45♠ | 20 July 1943 | 21:20 | B-25 | Eastern Front | |
| 46♠ | 20 July 1943 | 21:38 | TB-7 | 10 km (6.2 mi) northeast of Oryol | |
| 47♠ | 20 July 1943 | 21:50 | TB-7 | 15 km (9.3 mi) northeast of Oryol | |
| 48♠ | 20 July 1943 | 21:55 | TB-7 | 10 km (6.2 mi) northeast of Oryol | |
| 49 | 21 July 1943 | 01:30 | B-25 | Oryol | |
| 50 | 21 July 1943 | 22:25 | TB-7 | Oryol | |
| 51 | 31 July 1943 | 21:13 | PS-84 | Eastern Front | |
| 52 | 1 August 1943 | 21:40 | R-5 | Eastern Front | |
| 53 | 1 August 1943 | 21:47 | PS-84 | Eastern Front | |
| 54 | 1 August 1943 | 23:01 | R-5 | Eastern Front | |
| 55 | 2 August 1943 | 21:27 | R-5 | 5 km (3.1 mi) north-northwest of Djatkovo | |
| 56 | 3 August 1943 | 20:58 | DB-3 | Sossnewka | |
| 57 | 3 August 1943 | 21:12 | DB-3 | north of Karachev | |
| 58 | 3 August 1943 | 22:09 | DB-3 | 7 km (4.3 mi) northwest of Star | |
| 59 | 5 August 1943 | 22:44 | B-25 | Manjeschino | |
| 60 | 8 August 1943 | 21:50 | DB-3 | 3 km (1.9 mi) northeast of Star | |
| — (Note: This unconfirmed claim is not listed in Luftwaffe Night Fighter Claims 1939 – 1945.) | 8 August 1943 | 22:11 | SB | Eastern Front | |
– Stab II. Gruppe of Nachtjagdgeschwader 3 –
| 61 | 24 August 1943 | 00:18 | Halifax | north-northwest of Neuhaldensleben | |
| 62 | 18 October 1943 | 20:35 | Lancaster | Hanover | |
| 63 | 22 October 1943 | 21:10 | Lancaster | 10–20 km (6.2–12.4 mi) north-northwest of Kassel | |
| 64 | 22 October 1943 | 21:35 | Lancaster | Paderborn | |
– Stab of Nachtjagdgeschwader 2 –
| 65♠ | 2 January 1944 | 02:00 | Lancaster | near Berlin | Lancaster LM377/No. 61 Squadron RAF |
| 66♠ | 2 January 1944 | 02:18 | Lancaster | near Berlin | Lancaster JB548/No. 57 Squadron RAF |
| 67♠ | 2 January 1944 | 02:20 | Lancaster | near Berlin | Lancaster LM372/No. 467 Squadron RAF |
| 68♠ | 2 January 1944 | 03:00 | Lancaster | near Berlin | |
| 69♠ | 2 January 1944 | 03:10 | Lancaster | near Berlin | Lancaster JA711/No. 9 Squadron RAF |
| 70♠ | 2 January 1944 | 03:12 | Lancaster | near Berlin | |
| 71 | 14 January 1944 | 20:00 | Lancaster | | |
| 72 | 20 January 1944 | 19:10 | Halifax | near Berlin | |
| 73 | 20 January 1944 | 19:15? (Note: According to Luftwaffe Aces — Biographies and Victory Claims claimed at 19:20.) | Halifax | near Berlin | |
| 74 | 20 January 1944 | 19:25? (Note: According to Luftwaffe Aces — Biographies and Victory Claims claimed at 19:35.) | Halifax | near Berlin | |
| 75♠ | 21 January 1944 | 22:00? (Note: According to Luftwaffe Aces — Biographies and Victory Claims claimed at 02:20.) | Lancaster | near Magdeburg | |
| 76♠ | 21 January 1944 | 22:10 | Lancaster | near Magdeburg | |
| 77♠ | 21 January 1944 | 22:30 | Lancaster | near Magdeburg | |
| 78♠ | 21 January 1944 | 22:45 | Halifax | near Magdeburg | |
| 79♠ | 21 January 1944 | 23:15 | Halifax | near Magdeburg | |

=== Awards ===
- Wound Badge in Black
- Front Flying Clasp of the Luftwaffe for Bomber Pilots in Gold
- Front Flying Clasp of the Luftwaffe for Night Fighter Pilots in Gold
- Honor Goblet of the Luftwaffe (15 September 1941)
- Combined Pilots-Observation Badge
- Iron Cross (1939)
  - 2nd Class (5 June 1940)
  - 1st Class (26 June 1940)
- German Cross in Gold on 21 August 1942 as Oberleutnant in the 6./Nachtjagdgeschwader 2
- Knight's Cross of the Iron Cross with Oak Leaves and Swords
  - Knight's Cross on 2 October 1942 as Hauptmann and Staffelkapitän of the 9./Nachtjagdgeschwader 2 (Note: According to Scherzer the Knight's Cross was awarded on 7 October 1942.)
  - 290th Oak Leaves on 31 August 1943 and Hauptmann and Gruppenkommandeur of the I./Nachtjagdgeschwader 100 (Note: According to Scherzer as Gruppenkommandeur of the IV./NJG 5.)
  - 44th Swords on 23 January 1944 (posthumously) as Major and Geschwaderkommodore of Nachtjagdgeschwader 2

== Notes ==
Military offices
| Preceded by Oberleutnant Karl Hülshoff | Commander of Nachtjagdgeschwader 2; 1 January 1944 – 4 February 1944 | Succeeded by Oberst Günther Radusch |
