= Horst Patuschka =

Dr. Horst Patuschka
- Born: 22 May 1912; Kahla
- Died: 6 March 1943 (aged 30); Bizerte, Tunisia
- Military career
- Allegiance: Nazi Germany
- Branch: Luftwaffe
- Service years: ?–1943
- Rank: Hauptmann (captain)
- Unit: NJG 2
- Commands: II./NJG 2
- Conflicts: World War II: Defense of the Reich
- Awards: Knight's Cross of the Iron Cross

Dr. Horst Patuschka (22 May 1912 – 6 March 1943) was a Luftwaffe night fighter ace and recipient of the Knight's Cross of the Iron Cross during World War II. The Knight's Cross of the Iron Cross, and its variants were the highest awards in the military and paramilitary forces of Nazi Germany during World War II. Patuschka was killed on 6 March 1943 after his Junkers Ju 88 crashed near Bizerte, Tunisia due to engine failure. During his career he was credited with 23 aerial victories all of them at night. He was posthumously awarded the Knight's Cross on 10 May 1943.

== Group commander and death ==
On 3 December 1942, Patuschka was appointed Gruppenkommandeur (group commander) of II. Gruppe of NJG 2, succeeding Hauptmann Herbert Bönsch who had been killed in action on 1 August.

== Summary of career ==
=== Aerial victory claims ===
According to Obermaier, Patuschka was credited with 23 nocturnal aerial victories, claimed in an unknown number of combat missions. Foreman, Parry and Mathews, authors of Luftwaffe Night Fighter Claims 1939 – 1945, researched the German Federal Archives and found records for 23 nocturnal victory claims. Mathews and Foreman also published Luftwaffe Aces — Biographies and Victory Claims, also listing Patuschka with 23 claims.

Chronicle of aerial victories
Claim	Date	Time	Type	Location	Serial No./Squadron No.
– Ergänzungsgruppe of Nachtjagdgeschwader 2 –
1	13 April 1942	02:38	Wellington		
2	31 May 1942	00:17	Wellington		
3	31 May 1942	00:28	Wellington	west of Zeeland	
4	3 June 1942	02:50	Halifax		
– 8. Staffel of Nachtjagdgeschwader 2 –
5	14 July 1942	03:20	Wellington	vicinity of Nijnsel	
6	29 July 1942	02:00	Havoc		
7	1 August 1942	02:25	Hampden	vicinity of Ostend	
8	1 August 1942	03:27	Wellington		
9	13 August 1942	02:40	Halifax	Scheldt Estuary	
10	16 August 1942	05:05	Manchester		
11	28 August 1942	23:26	Wellington		
12	7 September 1942	04:41	Wellington	vicinity of Vlissingen	
13	10 September 1942	23:36	Stirling	northwest of Biervliet	
14	11 September 1942	01:37	Wellington	30 km (19 mi) west of Schouwen	
15	17 September 1942	00:12	Wellington	vicinity of Heiloo	
16	17 September 1942	00:45	Stirling	55 km (34 mi) west of Egmond aan Zee	
– 4. Staffel of Nachtjagdgeschwader 2 –
17	15 October 1942	23:29	Wellington	40 km (25 mi) west of Goeree-Overflakkee	
18	16 October 1942	00:25	Wellington	34 km (21 mi) west of Goeree-Overflakkee	
19	25 October 1942	03:10	Wellington	10 km (6.2 mi) west of Goeree-Overflakkee	
20	9 November 1942	22:42	Stirling	30 km (19 mi) northwest of IJmuiden	
– Stab II. Gruppe of Nachtjagdgeschwader 2 –
21	30 January 1943	04:06	Wellington	Mediterranean; PQ 57374	
22	8 February 1943	21:30	Halifax	Mediterranean	Halifax DT495/No. 462 Squadron RAAF
23	8 February 1943	22:13	Wellington	Mediterranean	Wellington LA994/No. 37 Squadron RAF

=== Awards ===
- Flugzeugführerabzeichen
- Front Flying Clasp of the Luftwaffe in Gold
- Iron Cross (1939) 2nd and 1st Class
- Honour Goblet of the Luftwaffe on 21 September 1942 as Hauptmann and pilot
- German Cross in Gold on 29 October 1942 as Hauptmann in the 7./Nachtjagdgeschwader 2 (Note: According to Obermaier on 16 November 1942.)
- Knight's Cross of the Iron Cross on 10 May 1943 as Hauptmann and Gruppenkommandeur of II./Nachtjagdgeschwader 2

== Notes ==
Military offices
Preceded by Hauptmann Herbert Bönsch	Gruppenkommandeur of II. Nachtjagdgeschwader 2; 3 December 1942 – 6 March 1943	Succeeded by Hauptmann Sewing
