= Günther Radusch =

German fighter ace and Knight's Cross recipient

- Born: 11 November 1912; Schwetz, German Empire
- Died: 29 July 1988 (aged 75); Nordstrand, West Germany
- Military career
- Allegiance: Nazi Germany; West Germany
- Branch: Reichsheer (1931–35); Luftwaffe (1935–45); German Air Force (1958–71)
- Service years: 1931–1945; 1958–1971
- Rank: Oberst (colonel)
- Units: J/88, ZG 1, NJG 1, NJG 3, NJG 2, NJG 5
- Commands: NJG 5, NJG 2, NJG 3
- Conflicts: See battles Spanish Civil War World War II: Defense of the Reich
- Awards: Spanish Cross in Gold with Swords; Knight's Cross of the Iron Cross with Oak Leaves

Günther Radusch (11 November 1912 – 29 July 1988) was a World War II German Luftwaffe pilot and wing commander. As a fighter ace, he claimed 65 enemy aircraft shot down in over 140 combat missions. He claimed one victory in the Spanish Civil War. During World War II, he was credited with 64 aerial victories in Defense of the Reich all of which claimed at night and includes the destruction of 57 four-engined bombers.

Born in Schwetz, Radusch volunteered for military service in the Reichsheer of the Weimar Republic in 1931. In parallel, he was accepted for flight training with the Deutsche Verkehrsfliegerschule, a covert military-training organization, and at the Lipetsk fighter-pilot school. Following flight training, he served with Jagdgeschwader 134 "Horst Wessel" (JG 134—134th Fighter Wing) and volunteered to fight in the Spanish Civil War where he claimed one aerial victory. For his service in Spain he was awarded the Spanish Cross in Gold with Swords.

At the outbreak of World War II on 1 September 1939, Radusch served with Zerstörergeschwader 1 and was appointed a squadron leader in June 1940. This unit became the nucleus of the newly created night fighter wing Nachtjagdgeschwader 1. He claimed his first nocturnal aerial victory on the night of 9/10 April 1941. In August 1943, Radusch was appointed Geschwaderkommodore (wing commande) of Nachtjagdgeschwader 5. Following his 25th aerial victory, he was awarded the Knight's Cross of the Iron Cross on 29 August 1943. In February 1944, Radusch was given command of Nachtjagdgeschwader 2 and received the Oak Leaves to his Knight's Cross on 6 April 1944 after 58 nocturnal aerial victories. In October, he was appointed commander of Nachtjagdgeschwader 3, a position he held until the end of World War II. After the war, Radusch reentered military service in the Bundeswehr in 1958 and retired 1971. Radusch died on 29 July 1988 in Nordstrand, West Germany.

== Early life and career ==
Radusch, the son of a middle school director, was born on 11 November 1912 in Schwetz, present-day Świecie in northern Poland, at the time in West Prussia within the German Empire. While at school, he learned to fly glider aircraft. In April 1931, Radusch began his pilot training at the Deutsche Verkehrsfliegerschule (DVS—German Air Transport School) at Schleißheim.

The DVS was headed by Carl Bolle, a World War I fighter pilot, and his flight instructor was Wilhelm Stör, another World War I fighter pilot. He and 29 other trainees were part of Kameradschaft 31 (camaraderie of 1931), abbreviated "K 31". Among the members of "K 31" were future Luftwaffe staff officers Bernd von Brauchitsch, Wolfgang Falck, Günther Lützow, Ralph von Rettberg and Hannes Trautloft. Radusch graduated from the DVS on 19 February 1932. Radusch and nine others, among them Lützow, Falck and Trautloft, were recommended for training at the Lipetsk fighter-pilot school in the Soviet Russia. Following his return from flight training, Radusch joined 4. (Preußisches) Infanterie-Regiment (4th (Prussian) Infantry Regiment), in Schwerin. There he completed his basic training, attended the Kriegsschule (war school) in Dresden, and was promoted to Leutnant (second lieutenant) on 1 October 1934. In 1935, he officially transferred to the newly formed Luftwaffe, at first serving as a fighter pilot instructor at Schleißheim, and was then assigned to the III. Gruppe (3rd group) of Jagdgeschwader 134 "Horst Wessel". III. Gruppe of JG 134 was formed on 4 January 1936 at Döberitz under the command of Major Oskar Dinort. The Gruppe was initially equipped with the Heinkel He 51 A-1. On 24 February, the unit was ordered to Lippstadt Airfield and participated in the remilitarisation of the Rhineland.

He was sent to Spain as part of the Condor Legion in October 1936. He claimed his only aerial victory in the Spanish Civil War on 22 April 1937. Together with fellow pilot Franz Heilmayer of 2. Staffel (2nd squadron) of Jagdgruppe 88 they each claimed one Polikarpov I-15 shot down, one of which was flown by Felipe del Río Crespo, a seven victory flying ace. Radusch also tested the Heinkel He 112 under combat conditions in Spain. For his services in Spain, he received the Spanish Cross in Gold with Swords (Spanienkreuz in Gold mit Schwertern). In 1939, Radusch served on the staff of the Inspekteur der Jagdflieger, an organization within the Luftwaffe responsible for the readiness, training and tactics of the fighter force.

== World War II ==
On Friday 1 September 1939, German forces invaded Poland starting World War II in Europe. Radusch flew the Messerschmitt Bf 110 heavy fighter during the Norwegian campaign and during the Battle of France. On the night of 30 April and 1 May, 50 Royal Air Force (RAF) Armstrong Whitworth Whitley, Vickers Wellington and Handley Page Hampden bombers attacked Luftwaffe airfields in Norway. Radusch, Falck, Oberleutnant Werner Streib, and another pilot, followed the bombers shortly before sunup on their flight back to England. The pilots attacked the bombers without claiming any aerial victories. Radusch Bf 110 sustained combat damage in the encounter, numerous bullet holes were counted following his landing at Aalborg. On 1 June, he was appointed Staffelkapitän (squadron leader) of 2. Staffel of Zerstörergeschwader 1 (ZG 1—1st Destroyer Wing), a squadron of I. Gruppe under the command of his "K 31" comrade Falck. On 22 June 1940, General der Flieger Albert Kesselring called Falck that Hermann Göring, commander-in-chief of the Luftwaffe, had tasked him with the creation of Nachtjagdgeschwader 1 (NJG 1—1st Night Fighter Wing). In consequence, I. Gruppe of ZG 1 became the I. Gruppe of NJG 1.

=== Night fighter career ===
A map of part of the Kammhuber Line, the 'belt' and night fighter 'boxes' are shown.

Following the 1939 aerial Battle of the Heligoland Bight, bombing missions by the RAF shifted to the cover of darkness, initiating the Defence of the Reich campaign. By mid-1940, Generalmajor (Brigadier General) Josef Kammhuber had established a night air defense system dubbed the Kammhuber Line. It consisted of a series of control sectors equipped with radars and searchlights and an associated night fighter. Each sector, named a Himmelbett (canopy bed), would direct the night fighter into visual range with target bombers. In 1941, the Luftwaffe started equipping night fighters with airborne radar such as the Lichtenstein radar. This airborne radar did not come into general use until early 1942.

On 1 July 1940, Radusch was appointed Gruppenkommandeur (group commander) of I. Gruppe of NJG 1. Already on 7 October 1940, he was appointed commander of I. Gruppe of Nachtjagdgeschwader 3 (NJG 3—3rd Night Fighter Wing), a position he held until 2 October 1941. Radusch claimed his first nocturnal aerial victory on 10 April 1941 when he shot down a Wellington bomber 2 kilometres (1.2 miles) southwest Papenburg.

=== Wing commander ===
On 2 August 1943, Radusch was appointed Geschwaderkommodore (wing commande) of Nachtjagdgeschwader 5 (NJG 5—5th Night Fighter Wing), succeeding Major Fritz Schaffer in this capacity. On the night of 17/18 August, Bomber Command launched Operation Hydra, the attack on a German scientific research centre at Peenemünde. Defending against this attack, Radusch claimed three bombers shot down near Peenemünde, taking his total to 25 nocturnal aerial victories. For this, he was awarded the Knight's Cross of the Iron Cross (Ritterkreuz des Eisernen Kreuzes) on 29 August.

Radusch was promoted to Oberstleutnant (lieutenant colonel) on 1 February 1944. On 21 January, Major Heinrich Prinz zu Sayn-Wittgenstein, the commander of Nachtjagdgeschwader 2 (NJG 2—2nd Night Fighter Wing), had been killed in action. On 4 February, Radusch succeeded Sayn-Wittgenstein in command of NJG 2 while command of NJG 5 was passed on to Major Egmont Prinz zur Lippe-Weißenfeld. Radusch shot down Halifax LV794 from No. 78 Squadron on 26 February. Pilot Flight Lieutenant William Carruthers met Radusch afterwards and recalled how the German pilot him in good English that he had studied at Oxford University before the war before he handed him cigarettes and chocolate. Radusch departed after expressing his regrets at the loss of Carruthers' aircraft and crew.

He became the 444th recipient of the Knight's Cross of the Iron Cross with Oak Leaves (Ritterkreuz des Eisernen Kreuzes mit Eichenlaub) on 6 April 1944 after 58 nocturnal aerial victories. The presentation was made by Adolf Hitler at the Berghof, Hitler's residence in the Obersalzberg of the Bavarian Alps, on 5 May 1944. Also present at the ceremony were Anton Hafner, Otto Kittel, Günther Schack, Emil Lang, Alfred Grislawski, Erich Rudorffer, Martin Möbus, Wilhelm Herget, Hans-Karl Stepp, Rudolf Schoenert, Otto Pollmann and Fritz Breithaupt, who all received the Oak Leaves on this date.

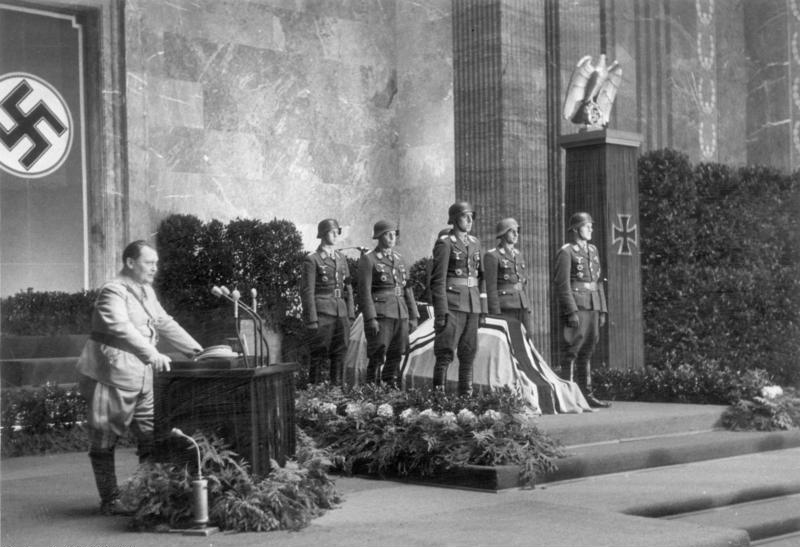
Hermann Göring speaking at Lent's funeral

On 7 October, Helmut Lent, the Geschwaderkommodore of NJG 3, died of wounds sustained in a flying accident the day before. Lent's state funeral was held in the Reich Chancellery, Berlin, on Wednesday 11 October 1944. Radusch, together with Oberstleutnant Hans-Joachim Jabs, Major Rudolf Schoenert, Hauptmann Heinz Strüning, Hauptmann Karl Hadeball and Hauptmann Paul Zorner, formed the guard of honour. On 12 November, Radusch succeeded Lent in command of NJG 3 which he led until the German surrender in May 1945. Radusch was promoted to Oberst (colonel) on 30 January 1945. He tested the Focke-Wulf Ta 154 as a night fighter aircraft in February but rejected it for its less than impressive performance.

== Later life ==
On 1 September 1958, Radusch reentered military service in the Bundeswehr holding the rank of Oberst in the West German Air Force. Until March 1964, he commanded the flight school (Flugzeugführerschule A) at Landsberg-Lech Air Base. Radusch died on 29 July 1988 in Nordstrand.

== Summary of career ==
=== Aerial victory claims ===
According to US historian David T. Zabecki, Radusch was credited with 64 aerial victories during World War II. (Note: For a list of Luftwaffe night fighter aces see List of German World War II night fighter aces) In total, he was credited with 65 aerial victories claimed in over 140 combat missions. He claimed one victory during the Spanish Civil War, the remaining 64 victories were all claimed at night and includes the destruction of 57 four-engine bombers. Foreman, Mathews and Parry, authors of Luftwaffe Night Fighter Claims 1939 – 1945, researched the German Federal Archives and found records for 64 nocturnal victory claims. Mathews and Foreman also published Luftwaffe Aces — Biographies and Victory Claims, listing Radusch with 65 claims, including one as a daytime fighter pilot in Spain.

Chronicle of aerial victories
Claim (total)	Claim (nocturnal)	Date	Time	Type	Location	Serial No./Squadron No.
– 2. Staffel of Jagdgruppe 88 –
1		22 April 1937	—	I-15	Spain	
– Stab I. Gruppe of Nachtjagdgeschwader 3 –
2	1	10 April 1941	03:00	Wellington	2 km (1.2 mi) southwest Papenburg	
– Stab II. Gruppe of Nachtjagdgeschwader 3 –
3	2	27 February 1942	00:55	Wellington	west Westerland	
4	3	26 April 1942	02:08	Stirling	south Scheldt Estuary	
5	4	28 April 1942	01:05	Stirling	Rømø	
6	5	29 April 1942	02:18	Wellington		
7	6	17 August 1942	02:42	Halifax	Sønderborg	
8	7	17 August 1942	02:52	Halifax		
9	8	22 September 1942	01:01	Wellington	18 km (11 mi) west Blidsel	
10	9	2 October 1942	01:04	Stirling		
11	10	2 October 1942	01:22	Stirling		
12	11	17 December 1942	19:53	Lancaster	southeast Ribe	
13	12	8 January 1943	20:00	Lancaster	west Sylt	
14	13	17 January 1943	22:14	Lancaster	5 km (3.1 mi) west Eiderstedt	
15	14	21 April 1943	03:07	Stirling	in sea	
16	15	21 April 1943	03:32	Stirling	in sea	
17	16	15 June 1943	01:15	Lancaster	10 km (6.2 mi) south Venlo	
18	17	15 June 1943	01:20	Lancaster	20 km (12 mi) west-southwest Venlo	Lancaster ED973/No. 100 Squadron RAF, 7 killed
– 3./Nachtjagdgeschwader 1 –
19	18	17 June 1943	01:45	Lancaster	northeast Neerpelt	
20	19	22 June 1943	01:34	Halifax	16 km (9.9 mi) north-northwest Venlo	Halifax HR799/No. 35 Squadron RAF
– Stab I. Gruppe of Nachtjagdgeschwader 1 –
21	20	25 June 1943	00:57	Wellington	Wellen	Wellington HF606/No. 300 Polish Bomber Squadron
22	21	25 June 1943	01:15	Wellington	Jasmund	Possibly Wellington HZ376/No. 300 Polish Bomber Squadron Perhaps crashed due to anti-aircraft fire. 4 men killed, 2 captured
23	22	25 June 1943	01:24	Lancaster	northwest Venlo	
24	23	26 June 1943	01:58	Halifax	20 km (12 mi) south Nijmegen	Halifax JD261/No. 51 Squadron RAF 7 men killed
25	24	29 June 1943	02:15	Halifax	Waalre	Halifax JD215/No. 419 Bomber Squadron RCAF, 7 men killed
26	25	29 June 1943	02:24	Halifax	7 km (4.3 mi) south Eindhoven	Halifax II DT783 ZA-Q/No. 10 Squadron RAF, 7 killed
27	26	29 June 1943	02:34	Halifax	5 km (3.1 mi) north Helmond	
28	27	29 June 1943	02:56	Lancaster	5 km (3.1 mi) northwest Eindhoven	
– Stab II. Gruppe of Nachtjagdgeschwader 3 –
29	28	28 July 1943	00:26	Lancaster	south Vollerwiek	
30	29	28 July 1943	00:43	Lancaster	Wöhrden	
31	30	30 July 1943	00:25	Lancaster	1 km (0.62 mi) north Hemminger	
32	31	3 August 1943	01:22	Lancaster	40 km (25 mi) east-southeast Helgoland	Lancaster ED705/No. 100 Squadron RAF, 7 killed
33	32	3 August 1943	02:14	Halifax	20 km (12 mi) north-northwest Helgoland	Halifax HR859/No. 51 Squadron RAF
– Stab of Nachtjagdgeschwader 5 –
34	33	18 August 1943	01:46	four-engined bomber	Peenemünde	Lancaster LM342/No. 467 Squadron RAAF
35	34	18 August 1943	01:55	four-engined bomber	Peenemünde	
36	35	18 August 1943	02:00	four-engined bomber	Peenemünde	
– Stab II. Gruppe of Nachtjagdgeschwader 3 –
37	36	22 September 1943	01:01	Wellington		
– Stab of Nachtjagdgeschwader 5 –
38	37	27 September 1943	23:24	Lancaster	southwest Hanover	
39	38	9 October 1943	01:51	Lancaster	20 km (12 mi) west Hanover	
40	39	22 October 1943	20:57	Halifax	5–10 km (3.1–6.2 mi) west-northwest Kassel	
41	40	22 October 1943	21:04	Halifax	10 km (6.2 mi) northeast Kassel	
42	41	22 October 1943	22:13	Lancaster	20 km (12 mi) north Kassel	
43	42	14 January 1944	19:29	Lancaster		
44	43	20 January 1944	19:30	Lancaster		
45	44	20 January 1944	19:39	Lancaster		
46	45	21 January 1944	23:15	Halifax		
47	46	29 January 1944	03:12	Halifax		
48	47	30 January 1944	20:24	Lancaster		
49	48	30 January 1944	20:27	Lancaster		
50	49	30 January 1944	20:30	Lancaster		
– Stab of Nachtjagdgeschwader 2 –
51	50	20 February 1944	05:39	four-engined bomber	KH-9	Lancaster ND410/No. 12 Squadron RAF
52	51	25 February 1944	24:00	Halifax	Schnee-Eifel	
53	52	26 February 1944	00:30	Halifax	south Rottweil	Halifax LV794/No. 78 Squadron RAF
54	53	31 March 1944	00:36	four-engined bomber	Adenau	
55	54	31 March 1944	00:41	Lancaster	southwest Koblenz	
– 8. Staffel of Nachtjagdgeschwader 2 –
56	55	22 May 1944	01:44	four-engined bomber	LK-LL-KL-KK	
57	56	22 May 1944	01:56	four-engined bomber	LK-LI-KI-KK	
58	57	22 May 1944	02:00	four-engined bomber	IK-KK-KI-II	
– Stab of Nachtjagdgeschwader 2 –
59	58	28 May 1944	02:07	four-engined bomber	Meerle	
60	59	13 June 1944	01:48	four-engined bomber	Amiens	
61	60	29 June 1944	00:37	Halifax	Compiègne	
62	61	29 June 1944	00:44	Halifax	Soissons	
63	62	1 July 1944	01:12	four-engined bomber	Saint-Leu-d'Esserent	
64	63	1 July 1944	01:14	four-engined bomber	Saint-Leu-d'Esserent	
65	64	8 July 1944	01:05	Lancaster	TB-89	

=== Awards ===
- Spanish Cross in Gold with Swords (14 April 1939)
- Honour Goblet of the Luftwaffe on 19 October 1942 as Major and Gruppenkommandeur
- German Cross in Gold on 13 February 1943 as Major in the II./Nachtjagdgeschwader 3
- Knight's Cross of the Iron Cross with Oak Leaves
  - Knight's Cross on 29 August 1943 as Major and Gruppenkommandeur of the II./Nachtjagdgeschwader 3
  - 444th Oak Leaves on 6 April 1944 as Oberstleutnant and Geschwaderkommodore of Nachtjagdgeschwader 5 (Note: According to Scherzer as Major and not Oberstleutnant.)

== Notes ==
Military offices
Preceded by Major Fritz Schäffer	Commander of Nachtjagdgeschwader 5; 2 August 1943 – 3 February 1944	Succeeded by Major Egmont Prinz zur Lippe-Weißenfeld
Preceded by Major Heinrich Prinz zu Sayn-Wittgenstein	Commander of Nachtjagdgeschwader 2; 4 February 1944 – 11 November 1944	Succeeded by Major Paul Semrau
Preceded by Oberstleutnant Helmut Lent	Commander of Nachtjagdgeschwader 3; 12 November 1944 – 8 May 1944	Succeeded by —
