= Klietz =

- Municipality
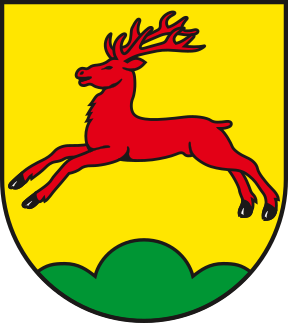
- Coat of arms

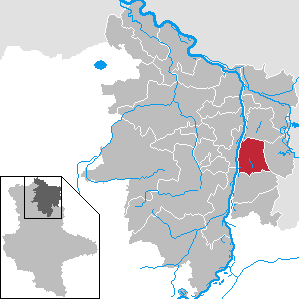
- Location of Klietz within Stendal district
- Interactive map of Klietz
- Location within Germany Location within Saxony-Anhalt
- Coordinates: 52°40′3″N 12°3′58″E
- Country: Germany
- State: Saxony-Anhalt
- District: Stendal
- Municipal assoc.: Elbe-Havel-Land

Government
  - Mayor (2021–28): Jens Meiering

Area
  - Total: 66.46 km^{2} (25.66 sq mi)
- Elevation: 32 m (105 ft)

Population (2025-12-31)
  - Total: 1,369
  - Density: 20.60/km^{2} (53.35/sq mi)
- Time zone: UTC+01:00 (CET)
  - Summer (DST): UTC+02:00 (CEST)
- Postal codes: 39524
- Dialling codes: 039327
- Vehicle registration: SDL
- Website: www.klietz.com

Klietz (German pronunciation: [kliːts]) is a municipality in the district of Stendal, in Saxony-Anhalt, Germany. In January 2010 it absorbed the former municipality Neuermark-Lübars.
