= Paul Semrau =

German officer and fighter pilot during World War II

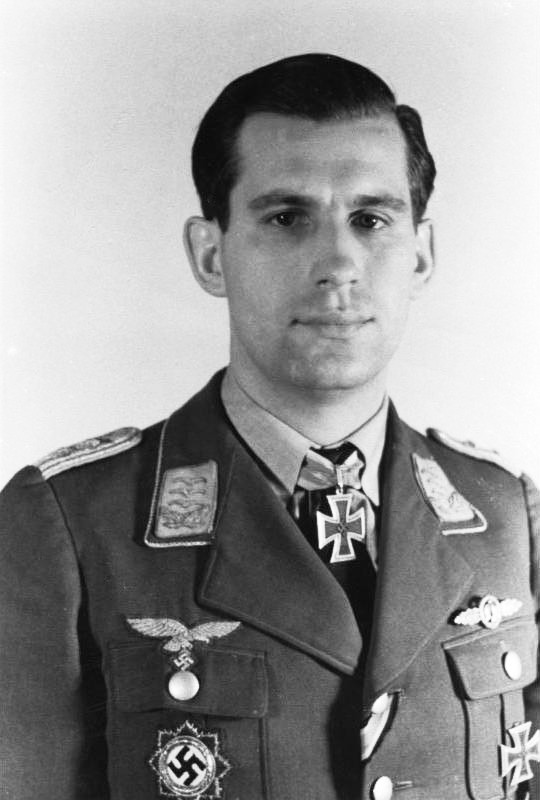
- Born: 12 November 1915; Deutsch Eylau, Kingdom of Prussia, German Empire
- Died: 8 February 1945 (aged 29) near Fliegerforst Twente, Twente, German-occupied Netherlands
- Burial place: Ysselsteyn German war cemetery, Netherlands (Block Q—Row 2—Grave 38)
- Military career
- Allegiance: Nazi Germany
- Branch: Luftwaffe
- Service years: 1936–1945
- Rank: Major (major)
- Units: KG 30, NJG 2, NJG 6
- Commands: 3./NJG 2, V./NJG 6, III./NJG 2, NJG 2
- Conflicts: See battles World War II: Norwegian Campaign; Battle of the Mediterranean; Defense of the Reich †
- Awards: Knight's Cross of the Iron Cross with Oak Leaves

Paul Semrau (12 November 1915 – 8 February 1945) was a German Luftwaffe military aviator and wing commander during World War II. As a night fighter ace, he is credited with 46 aerial victories claimed in 350 combat missions. (Note: For a list of Luftwaffe night fighter aces see List of German World War II night fighter aces) All of his victories were claimed over the Western Front against the Royal Air Force's (RAF) Bomber Command.

Born in Deutsch Eylau, Semrau grew up in the Weimar Republic and Nazi Germany. He joined the military service of the Luftwaffe in 1936. Following training, he was posted to Kampfgeschwader 30 (KG 30—30th Bomber Wing) and flew the Junkers Ju 88 as a bomber pilot during the Norwegian Campaign. In June 1940, Semrau transferred to the night fighter force where he was posted to I. Gruppe of Nachtjagdgeschwader 2 (NJG 2—2nd Night Fighter Wing). He claimed his first aerial victory on the night of 10/11 February 1941 and in December 1941, he was appointed squadron leader of 3. Staffel (3rd squadron) of NJG 2. In January 1944, he was given command of I. Gruppe and in November 1944 overall command of NJG 2. On 8 February 1945, Semrau and his crew were killed in action when they were shot down during a daytime maintenance flight by an RAF fighter aircraft. He was posthumously awarded the Knight's Cross of the Iron Cross with Oak Leaves on 17 April 1945.

== Early life and career ==
Semrau was born on 12 November 1915 in Deutsch Eylau, present-day Iława in northern Poland, at the time in the Province of Prussia within the German Empire. In 1936, he joined the military service with the Luftwaffe and was promoted to Leutnant (second lieutenant) in 1938. Following flight training, (Note: Flight training in the Luftwaffe progressed through the levels A1, A2 and B1, B2, referred to as A/B flight training. A training included theoretical and practical training in aerobatics, navigation, long-distance flights and dead-stick landings. The B courses included high-altitude flights, instrument flights, night landings and training to handle the aircraft in difficult situations. For pilots destined to fly multi-engine aircraft, the training was completed with the Luftwaffe Advanced Pilot's Certificate (Erweiterter Luftwaffen-Flugzeugführerschein), also known as the C-Certificate.) he was posted to Zerstörergeschwader 26 (ZG 26—26th Destroyer Wing).

== World War II ==
World War II in Europe began on Friday 1 September 1939 when German forces invaded Poland. Following the outbreak of war, Semrau was posted to the 3. Staffel (3rd squadron) of the Küstenfliegergruppe 106, a maritime aviation group. He then served as Staffelkapitän (squadron leader) of 2. Staffel of Zerstörergeschwader 2 (ZG 2—2nd Destroyer Wing) flying the Messerschmitt Bf 109 D single engine fighter. In March 1940, he transferred to the (Zerstörergruppe) of Kampfgeschwader 30 (KG 30—30th Bomber Wing) where he learned to fly the Junkers Ju 88 multirole combat aircraft.

=== Night fighter career ===
A map of part of the Kammhuber Line. The 'belt' and night fighter 'boxes' are shown.

Following the 1939 aerial Battle of the Heligoland Bight, Royal Air Force (RAF) attacks shifted to the cover of darkness, initiating the Defence of the Reich campaign. By mid-1940, Generalmajor (Brigadier General) Josef Kammhuber had established a night air defense system dubbed the Kammhuber Line. It consisted of a series of control sectors equipped with radars and searchlights and an associated night fighter. Each sector named a Himmelbett (canopy bed) would direct the night fighter into visual range with target bombers. In 1941, the Luftwaffe started equipping night fighters with airborne radar such as the Lichtenstein radar. This airborne radar did not come into general use until early 1942.

In July 1940, elements of (Z)/KG 30 were trained and converted to flying night fighter missions. This unit flew long-distance night fighter missions (Fernnachtjagd) referred to as intruder missions over England. These elements then became the II. Gruppe (2nd group) of the newly created Nachtjagdgeschwader 1 (NJG 1—1st Night Fighter Wing). On 11 September, II. Gruppe of NJG 1 was reassigned and became the I. Gruppe of Nachtjagdgeschwader 2 (NJG 2—2nd Night Fighter Wing) Kammhuber had created I. Gruppe of NJG 2 with the idea of utilizing the Ju 88 C-2 and Dornier Do 17 Z as an offensive weapon, flying long range intruder missions into British airspace, attacking RAF airfields. Until October 1941, I. Gruppe operated from the Gilze-Rijen Air Base, and commanded by Major Karl Hülshoff. Semrau was appointed Staffelkapitän of the 3. Staffel of NJG 2 on 22 December 1940.

Semrau claimed two aerial victories on the night of 10/11 February 1941 over two Bristol Blenheim bombers shot down near Feltwell. The Blenheim bombers belonged to No. 21 Squadron, the second of which was destroyed during the landing approach. These were his first aerial victories, he had already claimed six aircraft destroyed on the ground flying destroyer missions. The Blenheim bombers were returning from an attack on Hannover and included Blenheim Z5877 flown by Sergeant A. Chatterway who was killed in action. He claimed his third aerial victory on the night of 7/8 May when he shot down a Vickers Wellington bomber near Nottingham. This earned him the Iron Cross 2nd Class (Eisernes Kreuz zweiter Klasse) on 17 May. The following night, Semrau claimed a Blenheim bomber shot down south of Grantham.

Almost a month later, Semrau was awarded the Iron Cross 1st Class (Eisernes Kreuz erster Klasse) on 12 June. That night, he was credited with the destruction of a Handley Page Halifax bomber near of Finningley, his fifth aerial victory. On 7 July, Semrau shot down a Blenheim bomber over Wells. On 18 July, he claimed another Blenheim bomber near Digby. The aircraft shot down was however a Wellington bomber from No. 305 Polish Bomber Squadron. Semrau claimed his last long range intruder aerial victory on the night of 20 September when he shot down a Handley Page Hampden bomber 7 kilometers (4.3 miles) northeast of Upper Heyford. The aircraft was Hampden P5314 from No. 16 Operational Training Unit.

=== North Africa and the Mediterranean ===
The Battle of the Mediterranean and North African Campaign began in June 1940 with the Italian Empire's entry into the war on the side of the Axis powers. Italian military defeats necessitated the dispatch of the German Africa Corps (Deutsches Afrika Korps) under the command of Erwin Rommel to prevent the collapse of Italian Libya after the failed Italian invasion of Egypt. The Luftwaffe High Command (Oberkommando der Luftwaffe) sent forces into North Africa and Mediterranean to support to Axis forces and lay siege to Malta, the base from which British sea and air forces interdicted Axis air and supply routes. I. Gruppe of NJG 2 was ordered to move to the Mediterranean in mid-November 1941 where it was based at Catania, Sicily.

Semrau received the German Cross in Gold (Deutsches Kreuz in Gold) on 24 April 1942 and was promoted to Hauptmann (captain) on 1 June. On the night of 2/3 July, Semrau claimed a Wellington bomber shot down over North Africa. The Wellington probably belonged to No. 37 Squadron. On 4/5 July, he claimed another Wellington bomber which may have belonged to either No. 70 Squadron or No. 108 Squadron. He again claimed an aerial victory on the night of 5/6 July which may have been Wellington bomber DV508 from No. 37 Squadron. Semrau received the Knight's Cross of the Iron Cross (Ritterkreuz des Eisernen Kreuzes) after 160 combat missions and 14 aerial victories on 7 October 1942.

=== Group commander ===
Semrau was appointed Gruppenkommandeur (group commander) of the III. Gruppe of NJG 2 in July 1943 which was based in the Netherlands. This Gruppe was the former V. Gruppe of Nachtjagdgeschwader 6 (NJG 6—6th Night Fighter Wing) which was redesignated on 15 August 1943. He claimed his only aerial victory with III. Gruppe on the night of 9 October over an unidentified four-engine bomber, on a mission to bomb Hanover, 35 kilometers (22 miles) west of Den Haag. On 1 January 1944, Semrau succeeded Major Heinrich Prinz zu Sayn-Wittgenstein of II. Gruppe of NJG 2. On 1 May, he was promoted to Major (major).

On the night of 28/29 June, the RAF attacked the marshalling yards at Blainville-sur-l'Eau and Metz with 230 bombers. The RAF lost eighteen Halifax bombers and two Avro Lancaster bombers in the attack, including four Halifax bombers claimed by Semrau. No. 102 Squadron lost five Halifax bombers, including NA502 shot down by Semrau. On the night of 2/3 November, Bomber Command sent 992 bombers to Düsseldorf. In this attack, the RAF lost eleven Halifax and eight Lancaster bombers. That night, Semrau was credited with three aerial victories over unidentified four-engine bombers in the greater Ruhr area. These were his last claims with II. Gruppe of NJG 2.

=== Wing commander and death ===
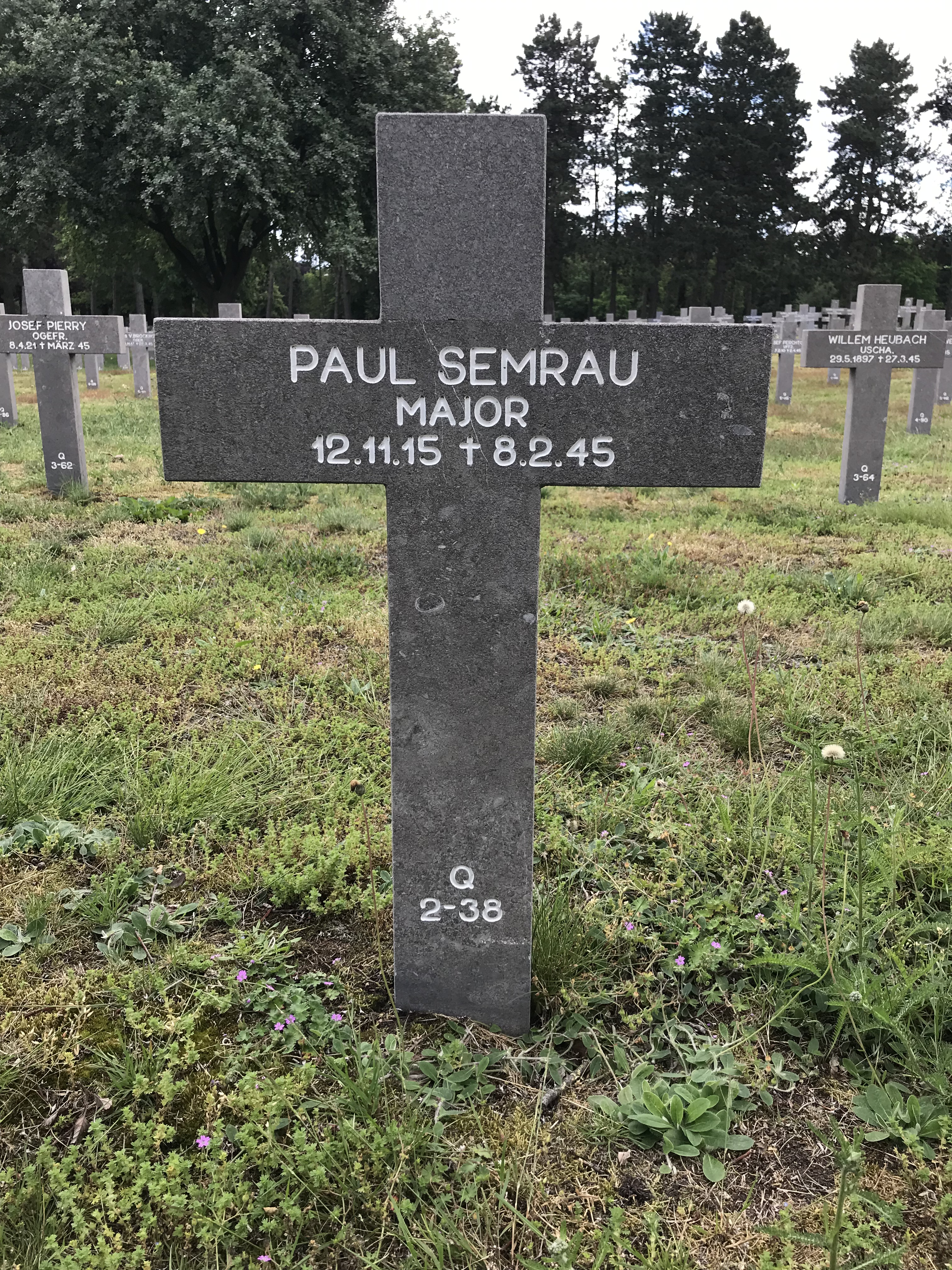
German War Cemetery Ysselsteyn - Paul Semrau

On 12 November 1944, Semrau was appointed Geschwaderkommodore (wing commander) of NJG 2, succeeding Günther Radusch. Command of II. Gruppe of NJG 2 was then passed to Hauptmann Heinz-Horst Hißbach. On the night of 6/7 January, the RAF attacked the German railroad junctions at Hanau and Neuss with over 600 bombers. Defending against this attack, Semrau claimed three Halifax bombers shot down, his last aerial victories.

Semrau was shot down on 8 February 1945 and killed in action on a factory flight with his crew, Oberfeldwebel Johann Hantusch and Fahnenjunker-Oberfeldwebel Robert Behrens, of Junkers Ju 88 G-6 (Werknummer 620 562 — factory number) when he was intercepted during the landing approach at Fliegerhorst Twente by a Supermarine Spitfire flown by Flight Lieutenant K.S. Sleep of Royal Canadian Air Force No. 402 Squadron on 8 February 1945 during Operation Veritable. The aircraft of Semrau came down between Fliegerhorst Twente and Oldenzaal. He was posthumously awarded the Knight's Cross of the Iron Cross with Oak Leaves (Ritterkreuz des Eisernen Kreuzes mit Eichenlaub) on 17 April 1945. He was the 841st member of the German armed forces to be so honored. He and his crew were buried at the Ysselsteyn German war cemetery in the Netherlands.

== Summary of career ==
=== Aerial victory claims ===
According to Spick, Semrau was credited with 46 nocturnal aerial victories claimed in an unknown number of combat missions. Foreman, Parry and Mathews, authors of Luftwaffe Night Fighter Claims 1939 – 1945, researched the German Federal Archives and found records for 40 nocturnal victory claims. Mathews and Foreman also published Luftwaffe Aces — Biographies and Victory Claims, listing Semrau with 39 claims. Two claims dated 28/29 January 1944 and 30/31 January 1944 respectively are not recorded in Luftwaffe Aces — Biographies and Victory Claims while one claim dated on 2 November 1944 is missing in Luftwaffe Night Fighter Claims 1939 – 1945.

Victory claims were logged to a map-reference (PQ = Planquadrat), for example "PQ 05 Ost AD". The Luftwaffe grid map (Jägermeldenetz) covered all of Europe, western Russia and North Africa and was composed of rectangles measuring 15 minutes of latitude by 30 minutes of longitude, an area of about 360 square miles (930 km^{2}). These sectors were then subdivided into 36 smaller units to give a location area 3 km × 4 km (1.9 mi × 2.5 mi) in size.

Chronicle of aerial victories
This and the ! (exclamation mark) indicates aerial victories listed in Luftwaffe Night Fighter Claims 1939 – 1945 but not in Luftwaffe Aces — Biographies and Victory Claims. This and the % (percent sign) indicates aerial victories listed in Luftwaffe Aces — Biographies and Victory Claims but not in Luftwaffe Night Fighter Claims 1939 – 1945.
Claim	Date	Time	Type	Location	Serial No./Squadron No.
– 3. Staffel of Nachtjagdgeschwader 2 –
1	11 February 1941	04:15	Blenheim	vicinity of Feltwell	
2	11 February 1941	04:20	Blenheim	vicinity of Feltwell	
3	8 May 1941	01:20	Wellington	vicinity of Nottingham	Oxford W6636/No. 14 Flying Training School RAF
4	18 May 1941	02:15	Blenheim	5 km (3.1 mi) south of Grantham	Battle R7363/No. 12 Flying Training School RAF
5	13 June 1941	01:40	Halifax	vicinity of Finningley	Wellington R1708/No. 25 Operational Training Unit RAF
6	19 June 1941	04:23	Whitley	over sea, 90 km (56 mi) northeast of Great Yarmouth	
7	7 July 1941	01:25	Blenheim	vicinity of Wells	Blenheim Z6041/No. 500 Squadron RAF
8	18 July 1941	02:50	Blenheim	vicinity of Digby	
9	20 September 1941	23:42	Hampden	7 km (4.3 mi) northeast of Upper Heyford	Hampden P5314/No. 16 Operational Training Unit RAF
10	30 June 1942	00:15	Halifax	Mediterranean	
11	30 June 1942	00:35	Wellington	Mediterranean	
12	3 July 1942	02:02	Wellington	Mediterranean	
13	5 July 1942	02:10	Wellington	Mediterranean	
14	6 July 1942	01:55	Wellington	Mediterranean	
– III. Gruppe of Nachtjagdgeschwader 2 –
15	9 October 1943	01:35	four-engined bomber	35 km (22 mi) west of Den Haag	
– II. Gruppe of Nachtjagdgeschwader 2 –
16!	28/29 January 1944	—	Lancaster		Halifax LK746/429 (Bomber) Squadron RCAF
17!	30/31 January 1944	—	Lancaster		
18	15 February 1944	20:58	Lancaster	vicinity of Berlin	
19	22 March 1944	21:40	four-engined bomber	vicinity of Minden	
20	31 March 1944	00:42	four-engined bomber	vicinity of Nuremberg	
21	11 June 1944	01:00	four-engined bomber	5–20 km (3.1–12.4 mi) south of Dreux	
22	11 June 1944	01:20	four-engined bomber	15–30 km (9.3–18.6 mi) northwest of Rambouillet	
23	15 June 1944	01:24	four-engined bomber	northeast of Fécamp	
24	25 June 1944	00:14	Lancaster	Saint-Valery-sur-Somme	
25	25 June 1944	00:17	Lancaster	Dieppe	
26	29 June 1944	00:31	Halifax	north of Rouen	
27	29 June 1944	00:45	Halifax	Étrépagny	
28	29 June 1944	00:45	Halifax	Étrépagny	Halifax LW143/No. 102 Squadron RAF
29	29 June 1944	01:00	Halifax	Soissons	
30	8 July 1944	01:07	four-engined bomber	PQ 05 Ost AD	
31	8 July 1944	01:12	four-engined bomber	PQ 05 Ost AD-BD-BE	
32	19 July 1944	01:10	four-engined bomber	east of Paris	
33	25 July 1944	00:01	four-engined bomber	northwest of Orléans	potentially Lancaster LM142/No. 15 Squadron RAF
34	25 July 1944	00:11	four-engined bomber	Orléans	
35	2 November 1944	19:15	four-engined bomber	Ruhr Area	
36	2 November 1944	19:17	four-engined bomber	Ruhr Area	
37	2 November 1944	19:21	four-engined bomber	west of Düsseldorf	
38%	2 November 1944	—	four-engined bomber		
– Stab of Nachtjagdgeschwader 2 –
39	6/7 January 1945	—	Halifax		
40	6/7 January 1945	—	Halifax		
41	6/7 January 1945	—	Halifax		

=== Awards ===
- Iron Cross (1939)
  - 2nd Class (17 May 1941)
  - 1st Class (12 June 1941)
- German Cross in Gold on 24 April 1942 as Oberleutnant in the 3./Nachtjagdgeschwader 2
- Knight's Cross of the Iron Cross with Oak Leaves
  - Knight's Cross on 7 October 1942 as Hauptmann and Staffelkapitän of the 3./Nachtjagdgeschwader 2
  - 841st Oak Leaves on 17 April 1945 (posthumously) as Major and Gruppenkommandeur of the I./Nachtjagdgeschwader 2

== Notes ==
Military offices
Preceded by Oberst Günther Radusch	Commander of Nachtjagdgeschwader 2; 12 November 1944 – 8 February 1945	Succeeded by Oberstleutnant Wolfgang Thimmig
