= Heinz-Horst Hißbach =

- Born: 30 January 1916; Dessau, German Empire
- Died: 14 April 1945 (aged 29); Gelnhausen, Germany
- Military career
- Allegiance: Nazi Germany
- Branch: Luftwaffe
- Service years: ?–1945
- Rank: Hauptmann (captain)
- Units: KG 40, NJG 2
- Commands: II./NJG 2
- Conflicts: World War II: Defence of the Reich; Operation Gisela
- Awards: Knight's Cross of the Iron Cross

Heinz-Horst Hißbach (Note: His name, in German, is spelled with a "sharp S"; see ß.) (30 January 1916 – 14 April 1945) was a Luftwaffe night fighter ace and recipient of the Knight's Cross of the Iron Cross (German: Ritterkreuz des Eisernen Kreuzes) during World War II. The Knight's Cross of the Iron Cross, and its variants were the highest awards in the military and paramilitary forces of Nazi Germany during World War II. Hißbach claimed 27 aerial victories, 22 of them at night. (Note: For a list of Luftwaffe night fighter aces see List of German World War II night fighter aces.)

== Career ==
Hißbach was born on 30 January 1916 in Dessau.

=== Night fighter career ===
A map of part of the Kammhuber Line. The 'belt' and night fighter 'boxes' are shown.

Following the 1939 aerial Battle of the Heligoland Bight, RAF attacks shifted to the cover of darkness, initiating the Defence of the Reich campaign. By mid-1940, Generalmajor (Brigadier General) Josef Kammhuber had established a night air defense system dubbed the Kammhuber Line. It consisted of a series of control sectors equipped with radars and searchlights and an associated night fighter. Each sector named a Himmelbett (canopy bed) would direct the night fighter into visual range with target bombers. In 1941, the Luftwaffe started equipping night fighters with airborne radar such as the Lichtenstein radar. This airborne radar did not come into general use until early 1942.

On 1 November 1944, Hißbach succeeded Major Paul Semrau as Gruppenkommandeur of II. Gruppe of Nachtjagdgeschwader 2 (NJG 2—2nd Night Fighter Wing).

In the night of 14/15 April 1945, Hißbach and his crew of Hubert Varzecha and Max Mayer were killed in action when they were shot down by anti-aircraft artillery. The three were strafing a US resupply column, destroying eight vehicles, in the area of Gelnhausen when their aircraft was hit and exploded. Posthumously, he was awarded the Knight's Cross of the Iron Cross (Ritterkreuz des Eisernen Kreuzes) that day.

== Summary of career ==
=== Aerial victory claims ===
According Spick, Hißbach was credited with 34 nocturnal aerial victories, claimed in approximately 200 combat missions. Foreman, Parry and Mathews, authors of Luftwaffe Night Fighter Claims 1939 – 1945, researched the German Federal Archives and found records for 30 victory claims. Mathews and Foreman also published Luftwaffe Aces — Biographies and Victory Claims, stating that Hißbach claimed more than 29 aerial victories, plus two further unconfirmed claims.

Victory claims were logged to a map-reference (PQ = Planquadrat), for example "PQ DF-DG". The Luftwaffe grid map (Jägermeldenetz) covered all of Europe, western Russia and North Africa and was composed of rectangles measuring 15 minutes of latitude by 30 minutes of longitude, an area of about 360 square miles (930 km^{2}). These sectors were then subdivided into 36 smaller units to give a location area 3 km × 4 km (1.9 mi × 2.5 mi) in size.

Chronicle of aerial victories
This and the – (dash) indicates unwitnessed aerial victory claims for which Hißbach did not receive credit. This and the ? (question mark) indicates information discrepancies listed in Luftwaffe Night Fighter Claims 1939 – 1945 but not in Luftwaffe Aces — Biographies and Victory Claims.
| Claim | Date | Time | Type | Location | Serial No./Squadron No. |
– I. Gruppe of Nachtjagdgeschwader 2 –
| 1? (Note: According to Luftwaffe Aces — Biographies and Victory Claims, this claim was unconfirmed.) | 25/26 July 1942 | — | Wellington | southwest of Crete | Wellington HF944/No. 108 Squadron RAF |
– 14. Staffel of Kampfgeschwader 40 –
| 1? (Note: This claim is not listed in Luftwaffe Night Fighter Claims 1939 – 1945.) | 30 November 1942 | 14:05 | Whitley | | |
– 5. Staffel of Nachtjagdgeschwader 2 –
| — ? (Note: This unconfirmed claim is not listed in Luftwaffe Night Fighter Claims 1939 – 1945.) | 14 October 1943 | — | B-17 | | |
| 2 | 21 January 1944 | 22:52? (Note: According to Luftwaffe Aces — Biographies and Victory Claims, claimed at 22:25.) | Lancaster | | |
| 3 | 21 January 1944 | 23:00 | Lancaster | | |
| 4 | 29 January 1944 | 03:20 | Lancaster | | |
| 5 | 29 January 1944 | 03:35 | Lancaster | | |
| 6 | 21 February 1944 | 04:09 | four-engined bomber | Stuttgart | |
| 7 | 25 February 1944 | 21:51 | four-engined bomber | vicinity of Schönbach | |
| 8 | 15 March 1944 | 23:26 | four-engined bomber | 70 km (43 mi) south of Stuttgart | |
| 9 | 24 March 1944 | 22:22 | four-engined bomber | 20–80 km (12–50 mi) from of Kassel | |
| 10 | 24 March 1944 | 22:50 | four-engined bomber | 20–50 km (12–31 mi) from of Berlin | |
| 11 | 31 March 1944 | 00:49? (Note: According to Luftwaffe Aces — Biographies and Victory Claims, claimed at 00:50.) | four-engined bomber | vicinity of Rheine | |
| 12? (Note: This claim is not listed in Luftwaffe Aces — Biographies and Victory Claims.) | 31 March 1944 | 00:50 | four-engined bomber | southwest of Buer | |
| 13 | 31 March 1944 | 00:50 | four-engined bomber | southwest of the Thuringian Forest | |
| 14 | 28 April 1944 | 03:06 | Halifax | Saint-Dizier | |
| 15 | 23 May 1944 | 01:18 | Lancaster | east of Uden | |
| 16 | 10 June 1944 | 00:38 | Lancaster | vicinity of Étrépagny | |
| 17 | 25 June 1944 | 00:38 | Lancaster | north of Abbeville | |
| 18 | 1 July 1944 | 01:25 | Lancaster | Blois-Vendôme | |
| 19 | 1 July 1944 | 01:38 | Lancaster | 30 km (19 mi) northwest of Châteaudun | |
| 20 | 5 July 1944 | 01:55 | Lancaster | south of Abbeville | |
| 21 | 8 July 1944 | 01:45 | Lancaster | Dieppe | |
| 22 | 19 July 1944 | 01:12 | four-engined bomber | Jouarre | |
| 23 | 19 July 1944 | 01:58 | four-engined bomber | Épernay | |
| 24 | 29 July 1944 | 00:46 | four-engined bomber | PQ DF-DG vicinity of Montargis-Sens | |
| 25 | 29 July 1944 | 01:23 | four-engined bomber | Chaumont | Lancaster PB245/No. 619 Squadron RAF |
| 26 | 29 July 1944 | 01:58 | four-engined bomber | 40 km (25 mi) west of Stuttgart | |
| 27 | 26 August 1944 | 01:24 | four-engined bomber | Darmstadt | |
| 28 | 19 September 1944 | 23:05 | Lancaster | west-northwest of Mönchengladbach | |
– II. Gruppe of Nachtjagdgeschwader 2 –
| 29 | 3/4 March 1945 | — | four-engined bomber | over England | |
| 30 | 3/4 March 1945 | — | four-engined bomber | over England | |

=== Awards ===
- Flugzeugführerabzeichen
- Front Flying Clasp of the Luftwaffe
- Iron Cross (1939) 2nd and 1st Class
- Honour Goblet of the Luftwaffe (Ehrenpokal der Luftwaffe) on 19 June 1944 as Hauptmann and pilot
- German Cross in Gold on 1 January 1945 as Hauptmann in the 5./Nachtjagdgeschwader 2
- Knight's Cross of the Iron Cross on 15 April 1945 as Hauptmann and Gruppenkommandeur of the II./Nachtjagdgeschwader 2

== Notes ==
Military offices
| Preceded by Major Paul Semrau | Gruppenkommandeur of II./NJG 2; 1 November 1944 – 14 April 1945 | Succeeded by Hauptmann Franz Brinkhaus |
