= Nachtjagdgeschwader 2 =

- Active: 1 September 1940 – 5 May 1945
- Country: Nazi Germany
- Branch: Luftwaffe
- Type: Night Fighter
- Role: Anti-aircraft warfare Air superiority Offensive counter air Intruder
- Size: Wing
- Engagements: World War II

Commanders
- Notable commanders: Heinrich Prinz zu Sayn-Wittgenstein; Günther Radusch

Insignia
- Identification symbol: Geschwaderkennung of 4R

Aircraft flown
- Fighter: Dornier Do 17; Dornier Do 215; Junkers Ju 88; Dornier Do 217; Messerschmitt Bf 110; Junkers Ju 388

Nachtjagdgeschwader 2 (NJG 2) was a German Luftwaffe night fighter and night intruder wing during World War II.

== Background ==
Night fighter operations did form part of Wehrmacht war games during 1935 and 1936. Luftwaffe Service Regulation No. 16 mentioned night fighting only in Section 253. The regulation stipulated in vague language, that night fighting zones should be established so that night fighters and anti-aircraft artillery did not interfere with each other's operations. The regulation foresaw the use of Search lights in cooperation with pilots. Any hindrance to offensive air forces caused by "restrictive measures" was to be avoided. The prevailing attitude to night fighting left commanders on the ground to carry out research on their own; the first occurred in Berlin, by Luftkreiskommando II from May to November 1936. The Oberkommando der Luftwaffe did order experiments with searchlights and aircraft from the summer, 1937. In 1939 several night fighter Staffeln (squadrons or flights) had been established; but all of these had been converted back to day fighter units by 16 August 1939.

The German invasion of Poland in September 1939 began World War II in Europe. The French Air Force and RAF Bomber Command began bombing raids on German ports and shipping. The Battle of the Heligoland Bight in December 1939 ended Royal Air Force (RAF) daylight operations until 1944. Bomber Command persisted in night operations against Germany, which extended to German towns and cities from 10/11 May 1940. The capitulation of the French after the Battle of France did not end the threat posed by British air power. Wolfgang Falck commanded I./Zerstörergeschwader 1 (ZG 1) during the German invasion of Denmark. Immediately after the occupation, Bomber Command appeared frequently to attack German positions, and Falck was able to fly interceptions during dusk. Falck was sure that a Messerschmitt Bf 110 unit could defend the airspace at night with assistance from radar operators. Falck was invited to the RLM to express his views to Albert Kesselring, Ernst Udet and Erhard Milch. Hermann Göring, commander-in-chief of the Luftwaffe, ordered Falck to create a Nachtjagdgeschwader at Düsseldorf on 22 June 1940.

Falck came to the conclusion, night fighting could not be organised and operated by one commanding officer of a single wing. In response, Josef Kammhuber formed the Night Fighter Division. Radar, search lights and anti-aircraft artillery were coordinated under this organisation at division-level on 17 July 1940. On 23 July the headquarters was established at Brussels, in occupied Belgium. On 1 August 1940 a command post was established at Zeist near Utrecht in the occupied Netherlands. The Zerstörer pilots and units were used for conversion to night fighters. No night fighter training schools existed in 1940, until blind-flying schools were established at Schleißheim from 1941. Kammhuber established the Night Fighter Division and Kammhuber Line, which eventually allowed radar to guide night fighters to RAF bombers.

=== Formation ===
I./NJG 2 was formed on 1 September 1940 from elements of 1./ZG 1 and the original II./Nachtjagdgeschwader 1 (NJG 1). II. Gruppe was raised as a single Staffel (number 4) from 1./Zerstörergeschwader 2 (ZG 2). The Gruppe was formally activated as such on 1 November 1941. It used 4. and 6./NJG 1 to accomplish the formation. On 1 October 1942 it became IV./NJG 1, and the existing III./NJG 2 became the new II./NJG 2 from that date. III./NJG 2 was formed in March 1942 and on 1 October 1942 became II./NJG 2. The second formation took place in July 1943 from V./Nachtjagdgeschwader 6 (NJG 6). On 30 October 1944, III./NJG 2 was again redesignated IV./Nachtjagdgeschwader 3 (NJG 3). The existing IV./NJG 3 then became the new III./NJG 3 in that wing. IV./NJG 2 was formed on 30 October 1944 from I./NJG 7 and on 23 February 1945 became NSGr 30. V./NJG 2 was formed from the retraining of III./Kampfgeschwader 2 but this Gruppe did not reach operational status. Stab/NJG 2 was not formed until 1 November 1941. Thus the existing Gruppen acted independently or as attachments to other night fighter wings. In general the night fighter force was equipped with the Bf 110 C-2, C-4 and D-1; the latter had the "Dachshund" belly tank removed. I./NJG 2 was the exception to the rule. Junkers Ju 88A-5 bombers were modified—stripped of bomber equipment—and converted to Ju 88C-2 heavy fighter standard. Dornier Do 17Z-7s Krauz were modified from bomber to night fighter standard. The Do 17 and Ju 88 initialed had weaker armament to the Bf 110, but the latter types could carry bombs considered ideal for intruder operations.

== World War II ==
Over Europe, the German defences were limited against Bomber Command raids in 1940 and 1941. The Nazi propaganda machine dismissed RAF bombers as "tired old cows", but the limited range of the precise Würzburg radar, and the inability to distinguish friend from foe, left the Luftwaffe at a disadvantage. The Henaja belt, which provided three radars per searchlight battery, covered the area from the Danish border to Maubeuge, could detect bombers entering and exiting the zone with great accuracy, but RAF bomber pilots learned to dive upon departing the belt, accelerate past the search light batteries at low-altitudes and escape the most hazardous part of the defence zone. The system bore the burden of the defensive battles in 1941. In 1942, the introduction of the Handley-Page Halifax and Avro Lancaster would produce further problems. The bombers could outrun a Bf 110C or D in a shallow dive and at altitudes of over 5,000 m (16,000 ft). German pilots would have to detect the bomber early in order to be able to dive from much greater heights. Kammhuber introduced tighter control-based tactics for night fighters, searchlight batteries and radar. The night fighters were guided to a radio beacon located behind an "illuminated belt" of searchlights. Once a bomber was detected the night fighter flew into the belt, turned behind the bomber and began the combat. Würzburg radars were required for the intercept; one to track the fighter, the other the bomber in order to coordinate the searchlight. It became known as the Helle Nachtjagd (Illuminated night fighting). The Himmelbett (canopy bed) replaced this system in 1941. The system remained the same, but the accurate, long-range Freya was introduced to maintain overall surveillance and often could bring the radar-less night fighters into visual range of the bomber. The introduction of the Freya radar, eventually improved the range and identification problems prevalent in 1940 and 1941. Weaknesses of the system allowed for only one German night fighter to be controlled from the ground by a team of two Würzburgs. Experimentation with Lichtenstein radar in 1941, and its gradual introduction in 1942, provided night fighters with their own sets on-board and increased the independence and effectiveness of night fighters. The removal of searchlights and anti-aircraft guns to organised points near cities by 1942 freed night fighters from direct cooperation with searchlights meaning that all the fighting was conducted purely in the dark.

=== Intruder operations ===
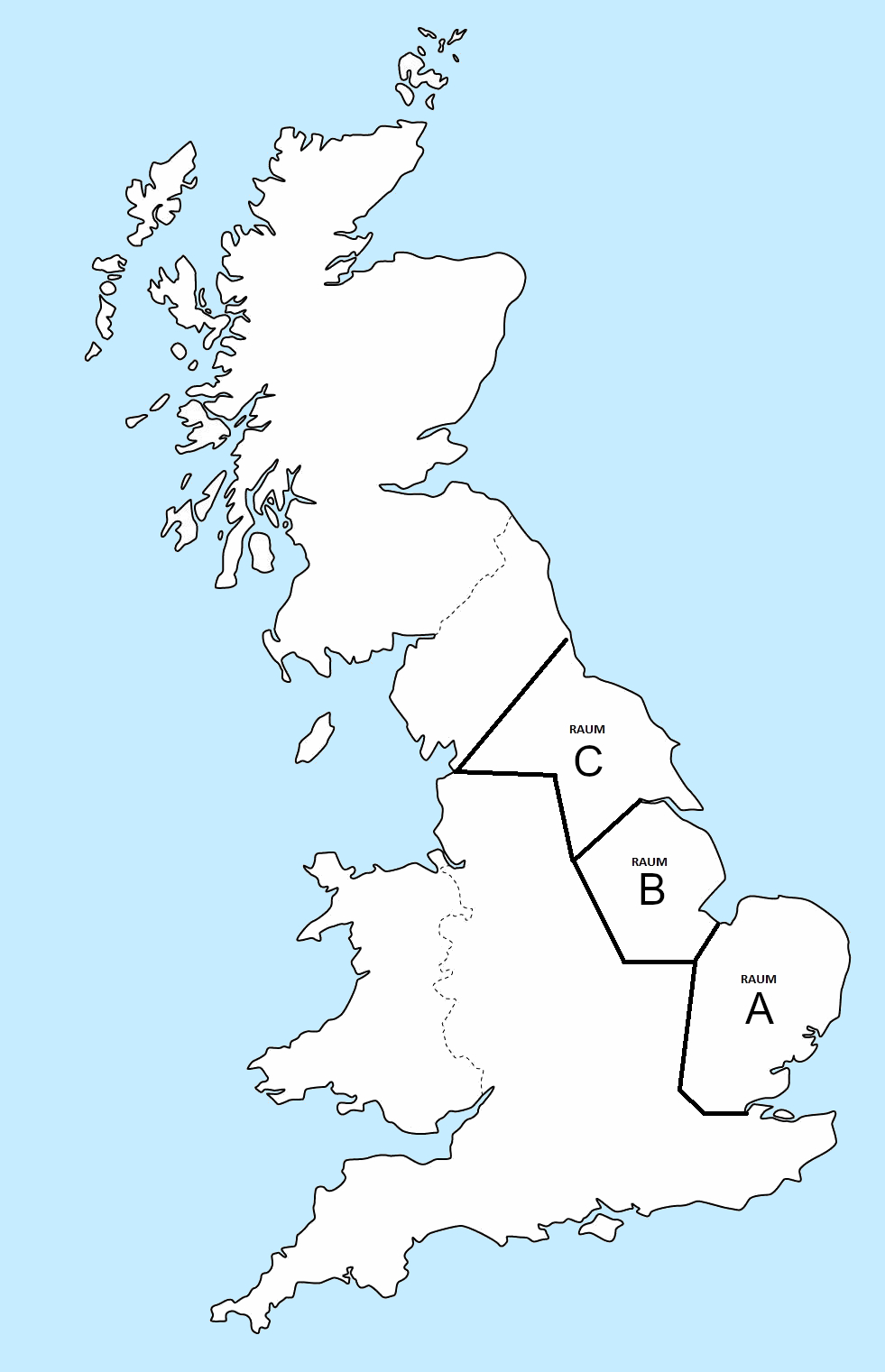
Boundary map drawn up by the Luftwaffe in 1940 for intruder operations

Before the introduction of improved radars and airborne radar, Kammhuber founded the Fernnachtjagd, or long-range night fighter intruder force 1940 to explore alternative night fighting methods and to forestall the intensified Bomber Command raids. The Luftwaffe quickly developed a series of basic tactics for intercepting enemy intruders. The lack of airborne radar at this stage in the war meant finding and destroying Allied bombers at night was a difficult prospect, thus it was decided to use the Fernnachtjagd in operations over Britain. Major Kuhlmann, head of the wireless telegraphy interception service played a significant part in assisting the Luftwaffe night fighter force as did Wolfgang Martini's Luftnachrichtentruppe (Air Signal Corps). Intercepting British signal communications by monitoring the radio traffic of enemy ground stations and aircraft the Germans could determine where and at what airfields RAF night activity was occurring. With the British base identified Falck could then move against them over their own airfields. Three waves could then be deployed; one to attack the bombers as they took off, one to cover the known routes taken by the enemy over the North Sea, and the third to attack them on landing at a time when, after a long flight, enemy crews were tired and much less alert. For operational purposes, Eastern England was divided into four regions or Räume (areas). Raum A was Yorkshire, bounded by Hull, Leeds, Lancaster and Newcastle. Raum B covered the Midlands and Lincolnshire whilst Raum C encompassed East Anglia bounded by London Peterborough, Luton and The Wash. Operations began in earnest in October 1940.

Under the command of Karl-Heinrich Heyse, I./NJG 2 was designated an intruder unit, as the idea of a complete intruder wing gained traction. The Gruppe was assigned longer-range and modified Do 17Z and Ju 88C aircraft for intruder operations as they could carry heavy armament and bombs, unlike the shorter-range Bf 110. German airborne radar was still a year from operations, and German crews were reliant on visual contacts; navigation lights and Flare Paths. The Do 17 Z-10 Kauz II had an infra-red searchlight for the Spanner Anlage infrared detection system installed to aid detection-finding. During the late summer 1940, the staff of I./NJG 2 at Gilze-Rijen Air Base developed tactics for operations over the United Kingdom. The first claim was made in this role on 23/24 October 1940. Heyse, a Condor Legion veteran, was killed within the month and replaced. The practice of intruder operations proved difficult in 1940. By December NJG 2 had lost 32 aircrew killed in action and 12 aircraft lost in exchange for 18 RAF aircraft claimed shot down. Despite the claims made by German crews, evidence showed a considerable amount of over claiming, and the difficulty in substantiating claims at night and over enemy territory became evident. The operational level problems left an average of only 20 machines available for intruder missions between August 1940 and October 1941. Between 1 October 1940 and 31 March 1941 the crews of NJG 2 made some fifty individual attacks on Bomber Command aircraft. By November 15 serviceable aircraft in the Gruppe had fallen to seven by February 1941.

Intruder pilots began accumulating personnel successes. One such pilot was Paul Semrau. He claimed his 6th victory on the night of 18/19 June 1941 off Great Yarmouth. Semrau claimed 46 night victories until he was killed by Supermarine Spitfires in February 1945 conducting an unwise daylight test flight. There were successful intruder pilots who did not become high-claiming night fighters. Albert Schulz and Hermann Sommer of 2./NJG 2 claimed several victories over England; Sommer later fought in the Battle of the Mediterranean. Sommer proved intruders a threat to RAF training centres when he accounted for an Airspeed Oxford trainer on 29 April 1941, confirmed through British sources. Wilhelm Beier, another eventual Knight's Cross of the Iron Cross recipient, from 3./NJG 2 claimed two aircraft on two consecutive nights from 5 to 7 July 1941 to reach his 10th victory. Heinz-Horst Hißbach was another that began his career on intruder missions. Heinz Strüning ended the intruder missions with nine victories. Total claims improved from 1940. In 1941, until mid-October, 128 RAF aircraft were claimed against 28 losses. Other sources put German losses at 55 aircraft along with 74 personnel. RAF night fighters carrying aircraft interception radar were making flights to England hazardous. Hans Hahn of I./NJG 2 became the leading intruder "expert", but was killed in October 1941, shortly before Adolf Hitler ordered a stop to intruder operations. Bomber Command reports list only seven complete losses to intruders and 20 badly damaged aircraft from 1 October 1940 to 31 March 1941.

Despite the heavy price I./NJG 2 had to pay, their successes rose. On 26 June 1941, the Gruppe claimed its 100th victory. Expansion and intensification of intruder operations carried out by NJG 2 and NJG 1 was hampered by the low production of Ju 88 night fighter variants, to Kammhuber's frustration—he viewed the type as the standard intruder for the Luftwaffe. As it appeared night intruder sorties were showing promise Hitler ordered a cessation of operations. For propaganda purposes, he thought that the morale of the German people would be better served by seeing British bombers destroyed and wrecked over German territory. Hitler was also reticent owing the fact there had been no noticeable reduction in British air raids and the RAF had not adopted these methods during The Blitz. This order came into effect on 12 October 1941.

=== Area offensives: Cologne and Lübeck ===
At the end of 1941 Bomber Command's future was in doubt after the shock of the Butt Report. 1942 became the command's watershed year. In February 1942, Air Marshall Arthur Harris became Air Officer Commanding Bomber Command. Harris became the driving force behind producing a powerful heavy bomber command to carry out his area bombing operations. The attacks on Lübeck in March and Cologne in May 1942 began the new phase in the Defence of the Reich campaign. At the start of the area offensives Stab/NJG 2, under the command of Hulshoff, II. Gruppe under Lent, and III. Gruppe under Bönsch, were based at Gilze Rijn. II./NJG 2, which travelled to Sicily, returned in September 1942 and was posted to Melsbroek. The only distraction to the attacks occurred in February 1942 when II./NJG 2 took part in Operation Donnerkeil to provide air cover for the Kriegsmarine's Operation Cerberus.

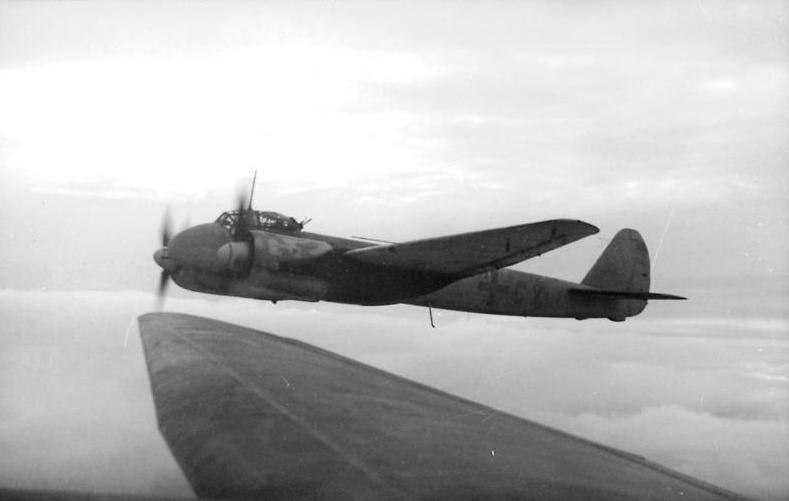
Ju 88C heavy fighter used for night fighting by NJG 2 in Africa

Lent was among the few NJG 2 pilots to claim in the defence of Lübeck to reach his 26th night victory. Bomber Command's success cost them only 12 aircraft. NJG 2 claimed 11 bombers during the latter attack on Cologne on 30/31 May 1942 from the 32 claimed by German night fighter units. 41 bombers were lost. Bomber Command's attack on Bremen in June 1942 cost it 52 bombers; II./NJG 2 claimed 16. By this time a number of fighter pilots from NJG 1 had joined NJG 2. Helmut Lent (49 at the end of 1942) and Ludwig Becker (44), the former the second highest claiming night fighter in history, and the latter the first to claim a victory with Lichtenstein radar introduced in small numbers in 1941 joined in November that year. Paul Gildner (38) followed from NJG 1. Other NJG 2 pilots and their supporting crews, Leopold Fellerer, Heinz Strüning (23), Heinrich Prinz zu Sayn-Wittgenstein (38), Rudolf Schoenert (23) began claiming bombers with growing frequency in 1942. These men led the Luftwaffe. Heinz Vinke made his first claims in 1942 becoming an ace in August. The cause of this rise in claims was growing experience of crews and ground controllers, coupled with high-performing ground radar and the introduction of airborne sets installed in night fighters. In November 1941 losses had already taken effect. Winston Churchill ordered Bomber Command to curtail German operations to conserve its strength for 1942. The initial reaction by night fighter pilots, who followed the trends set by Lent and Gildner, to Lichtenstein radar was hostile. The set was perceived as cumbersome and negatively affected the performance of the aircraft.

The transition to airborne radar was not smooth. Production failures and rushed construction damaged their potential. Even in August 1943, two years after its debut, eighty percent of the sets produced and delivered to operational centres at Werl and Gütersloh were defective and technicians were overloaded with repair work. A large proportion of the Lichtenstein sets were sent back to the manufacturer. The consequences of the reduction in operational sets, was the Netherlands-based units were given priority. I./NJG 1 and II./NJG 2 were given priority since they patrolled air space most used by Bomber Command squadrons in transit to Germany. High performing maintenance teams ensured these Gruppen had above average operational sets. In September 1942, the Gruppen were fully equipped with the Lichtenstein B/C model. A test detachment helped with II./NJG 2 availability. A crucial development was the use of IFF (identification friend or foe) devices in the night fighters and as attachments to the Freya. Signals, or pulses, were sent from the Freya, picked up by the night fighter, and returned at a certain rhythm. The Freya controllers could now see which blips on their screens were enemy and friendly. None of the devices had been tested in combat. Luftwaffe controllers opted to use radio transmissions (Y-service) at the time instead, since it was proven in bomber navigation. Through using transmitters, receivers and direction finding equipment, the bearing, height and range of the night fighter could be determined. In practice two Wurzburg sets controlled one fighter, while the Y-Service controlled two all within one zone or "box". The practice soon exposed the difficulties in Y-controlled night fighting; although it provided faultless IFF it was not as accurate as radar and vulnerable to British jamming and allowed their night fighters to home in on German aircraft. The use of IFF devices and airborne radar were the only ways to detect enemy aircraft and plan an interception. Prior to the use of IFF devices, a night fighter had to return to orbiting a radio beacon after each attack to allow its detection by German radar controllers.

NJG 2 was the most successful in January 1942, claiming 15 of the 18 enemy aircraft claimed by the Luftwaffe night fighter force. In February it led the Luftwaffe with eight claims. In March NJG 2 pilots claimed 28, in April 21, May 22 and in June 1942 99 enemy aircraft were claimed in total, including Africa. This declined to 49 in July and three by December 1942. Post war analysis mentions NJG 2 on 42 occasions in connection with specific downed British bombers during 1942. 687 bombers were claimed at night by the Luftwaffe in 1942 with another four in daylight by night fighters. A further 51 were claimed in the Mediterranean—where I./NJG 2 operated that year. 38 were claimed on the Eastern Front for a total of 780 approximate claims. NJG 2 claimed the approximate total of 800 aerial victories during the war.

=== North Africa and the Mediterranean ===
The Battle of the Mediterranean and North African Campaign began in June 1940 with the Italian Empire's entry into the war on the side of the Axis powers. Italian military defeats necessitated the dispatch of the German Africa Corps (Deutsches Afrika Korps) under the command of Erwin Rommel to prevent the collapse of Italian Libya after the failed Italian invasion of Egypt. The Luftwaffe High Command (Oberkommando der Luftwaffe) sent forces into North Africa and Mediterranean to support to Axis forces and lay siege to Malta, the base from which British sea and air forces interdicted Axis air and supply routes. I./NJG 2 was ordered to move to the Mediterranean in the autumn, 1941.

I./NJG 2 was ordered to Catania, Sicily. Though its Staffeln ended up spread throughout the Mediterranean and Africa from April 1942 but Catania was its headquarters. It remained in southern Europe until September 1942. The unit briefly returned to the Netherlands that month to undertake intruder operations against a possible United States Air Force (USAAF) night offensive but it did not materialise. It was not furnished with Lichtenstein radar and the crews had to fighter their war blind, supported by a few radar sets on the ground. The reasons lay in the fear of the OKL that an aircraft may land in enemy territory and captured. Daylight brought no respite for the pilots had to fly interceptions, convoy escort and close air support where possible. Only assistance from III./ZG 26 provided relief. The pilots were forced to fly to the limits of their aircraft and endurance. In June and July 1942 they were still able to claim 25 aircraft shot down. Four pilots were awarded the German Cross in Gold in Africa. In August 1942 the Gruppe was sent back to Sicily, presumably to fly in support of the invasion of Malta. On 10 August 1942, I./NJG 2 returned to Germany leaving only a small detachment Iraklion in Crete. 2. Staffel were the only formation from the Gruppe to see action in Africa, arriving by 18 November 1941. The unit operated from Benghazi; Sommer made a claim on 29 April and further claims were made on 4 May 1942. The Staffel located to Derna by 10 May. The unit was ordered to take part in Offensive counter air operations. On 25 May the Staffel reported one loss attacking Gasr el Arid airfield, followed by another on 27 May as 2./NJG 2 fought in the Battle of Gazala. 16 Ju 88Cs from the Gruppe were in Africa by 5 June 1942. They flew from airfields at Qasaba, Tobruk, along with aforementioned bases. Immediately following the arrival of the full Gruppe the Long Range Desert Group raided Qasaba destroying 20 Axis aircraft; five NJG 2 aircraft were among them. The night of 28/29 June 1942 proved the most expensive single action of the African campaign when one Ju 88 was destroyed and two more damaged. Heinz Rökker's aircraft was lost but he managed to survive. Rökker was a night fighter pilot who emerged to claim his early successes over the Mediterranean Sea. He made a claim on 19 June 1942, near Crete Rökker's unit moved to Africa and operated over Mersa Matruh, Egypt, where he claimed a further success on 25/26 June.

From 25 May to 31 December 1942, I./NJG 2 claimed 20 aircraft that can be confirmed post-war and 13 that cannot. 13 Ju 88s were destroyed and 7 damaged to all causes. Three men were posted missing, two captures and 16 killed. A further seven landed in enemy territory but were able to evade. Stab and II./NJG 2 transferred to the Mediterranean and in December 1942 were carrying out convoy escort patrols, anti-submarine warfare operations along with the night fighter missions. The Gruppe was commanded by Hauptmann Herbert Bönsch while based at Comiso. The night fighters were placed under the tactical command of Fliegerkorps II. The work and long and tedious, requiring crews to fly long hours circling convoys, escorting transports or hunting submarines. NJG 2 remained present in Africa through to the Battle of Tunisia. The last recorded action for the year was the reported destruction of a 104 Squadron by Hauptmann Patushka of II./NJG 2 in defence of Axis airfields in Sfax. From 1 January to 11 May 1943, II./NJG 2 are known to have claimed 13 aircraft for the loss of 7. Among the notable losses was Hauptmann Dr. Horst Patuschka, killed on 6 March 1943 with his personal total at 23. NJG 2 night fighters tried in vain to turn the tide of Allied air supremacy over the Tunis and Bizerte skies. The Allied air forces now had a strangle hold on the aerial routes which supplied and evacuated material and personnel (Operation Flax) from Africa. NJG 2 carried out counter-air operations across the sea. It is known to have attacked the Allied airfield at Bône, Algeria. The night fighter Staffeln located in Tunisia remained until 11 May, in effect the last hours, when radar and technical specialists were flown out via Fieseler Fi 156 Storch light aircraft. NJG 2 relocated to Comiso in May but were exposed to air attack. The Gruppe lost three Ju 88C-6s in an air raid on 26 May.

The Gruppe located to Aquino, Italy in 1943. In June 1943 the islands of Pantelleria and Lampedusa were captured by Allied forces. After these developments NJG 2 moved to Pontecorvo and Aquino in Central Italy. During June and July the night fighters managed to shoot down only three enemy bombers near the Strait of Messina, the area covered by the sole operational ground radar site. The II./NJG 2 was in such poor condition it was retired to Parchim and Neubrandenburg for rest and re-equipment. II./NJG 2 appears to have been active over Italy in to August 1943, for it reported the loss of a Ju 88 on the night of the 31 July/1 August during an air raid on Palermo. The growing danger Allied air power presented to Germany was considered the main threat and the Luftwaffe withdrew night fighting units back to Germany. Small numbers of Bf 110s and Dornier Do 217s with Lichtenstein installations were given to the Regia Aeronautica and their crews trained at Venlo. These aircraft were fitted with Lichtenstein FuG 202 and FuG 212 radar.

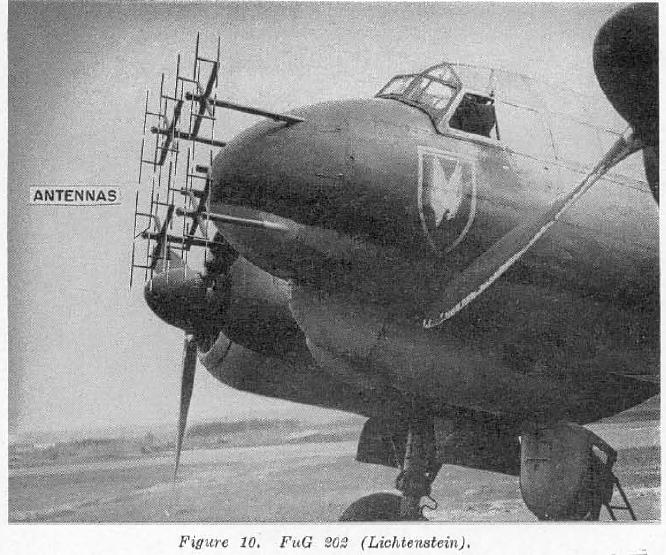
Ju 88R with Lichtenstein FuG 202, December 1943

=== The Ruhr, Hamburg, Peenemünde ===
In March 1943, Harris began his first concerted military campaign against a specific objective, known as the Battle of the Ruhr. Harris had 53 squadrons for the battle, and his pathfinders were now operating the H2S ground-mapping radar. The Air Marshal felt he had sufficient resources for a long offensive against the German industrial region. The German night fighter wings had improved also; their airborne radars accounted to an estimated 36 percent of British bombers shot down in the coming battle. Chief of the Air Staff, Charles Portal remarked that if "Window" had been used at the time, 230 bombers and crews could have been saved.

NJG 2's order of battle excluded I. Gruppe from the wing, then serving in the Mediterranean until early August 1943. From May 1942 to March 1943 Stab/NJG 2 under Hulshoff at Glize Rijn with the Ju 88C. Lent and Bönsch commanded II and III./NJG 2 from the same aerodrome with the same aircraft. At the start of the Ruhr campaign, Stab and II./NJG 2 were moved to Comiso, Sicily while I./NJG 2 had moved to Catania. III./NJG 2 ceased to exist on 1 October 1942 and became II./NJG 2 as the Gruppen swapped identity. The second formation, simultaneous with its disbandment, was made from V./NJG 6. NJG 2 was not listed on the Luftwaffe defences at the beginning of the campaign, but 5. Staffel is known to have served as an independent unit and claimed successes in April 1943. NJG 2 spent the majority of the mid-1942 to mid-1943 period in the Mediterranean.

No claims were made in March 1943 and eight in April. This single unit failed to score in May, claimed only two in June and one in July 1943 as the battle came to a close. The Nazi Reich Ministry of Public Enlightenment and Propaganda, Joseph Goebbels regarded the raids as a defeat for the Luftwaffe. Bomber Command had suffered heavy losses to German night fighters and anti-aircraft defences. 1,099 were lost to all causes. Nevertheless, steel production fell forcing a scale-back in production. This disruption caused the zulieferungskrise (sub-components crisis). The increases in aircraft production for the Luftwaffe also came to an abrupt halt. Monthly production failed to increase between July 1943 and March 1944. Adam Tooze concluded; "Bomber Command had stopped Speer's armaments miracle in its tracks." Production of locomotives halted after March 1943 in the Ruhr along with ammunition fuses. Over 100,000 people were dehoused in Essen, contributing to the inability to continue production at the Krupp plants.

On 24 July 1943, days after the end of the Ruhr campaign, Harris ordered "Operation Gomorrah", an attack on Hamburg. The objective was to disrupt or end U-boat production in the port city.The introduction of "Window" blew a hole in German radar coverage and the bomber streams, aided by OBOE and H2S radar were able to penetrate the defences to devastate the centre of the city. The Himmelbett (canopy bed) system of radar-controlled night fighters slipping into the bomber stream and then using its own radar to pick out and engage individual bombers had gone. The effects of the raid, and the realisation German radar was temporarily blinded, led to the widespread use of the Wild Boar (Wilde Sau) tactics over the summer, 1943. Bomber Command reacted to Wild Boar operations by shortening the time bombers spent over the cities, use of Mandrel and "spoof" or diversion raids. Extended "Window" operations obscured radar and left German single-seat and engine fighters without any guidance for a time. NJG 2 failed to shoot down any RAF bombers. 12 bombers were claimed by night fighter pilots; nine by NJG 3 and three by NJG 1.

In August 1943, I. and II./NJG 2 were deployed to the 4. Jagddivision covering Eastern Germany including Berlin, and the Baltic coast. The return of units from the Mediterranean left only one Gruppe fit for operations while the others resited and replenished. Bomber Command's attack on Peenemünde in August 1943 involved NJG 2 only peripherally. Parts of NJG 2 were at Gilze Rijn but only a single crew from the Ergänzungsstaffel reached Peenemunde and claimed a single bomber destroyed. On 15 October 1943, NJG 2 moved to the 1. Jagddivision covering the Netherlands and Belgium. I. Gruppe was positioned at Gilze Rijnen, II. Gruppe at Melsbroek, and III. Gruppe was based at Schiphol near Amsterdam. The attack on Kassel on 22/23 October was frustrated by Operation Corona which confused the defences and allowed Bomber Command to devastate the centre of the city. Prominent night fighter teams scored this night. Heinrich Prinz zu Sayn-Wittgenstein and Meurer claimed two and one apiece. 39 Bomber Command aircraft were reported lost; the Luftwaffe lost six night fighters. On 29 November 1943, NJG 2 and the 1st-5th night fighter wings were to reorganise. The plan was for each wing to be equipped with one type of aircraft. For NJG 2, the plan was to convert purely onto the Ju 88R for "Tame Boar" operations only though the goal was only partially realised. In August 1943 the Luftwaffe night fighter arm claimed 250 aircraft shot down on all fronts. The success was offset by losses of 40 killed, with only 28 replacements in August. 61 twin-engine night fighters were lost during the month, 59 were replaced.

In 1943 the development of the Serrate radar detector and their installation on de Havilland Mosquito and Bristol Beaufighters changed the air war significantly. They provided indirect fighter escort to Bomber Command over the Ruhr. These crews came from Fighter Command, and termed their operations as "flower" sorties. RAF pilots flew to known German night fighter airfields and patrolled them in an effort to destroy Luftwaffe interceptors as they got airborne or landed. As one German historian noted, the advent of the frequent Mosquito intruder operations from October 1943 meant "no airfield in Central Germany was safe."

=== Battle of Berlin, Nuremberg, Normandy ===
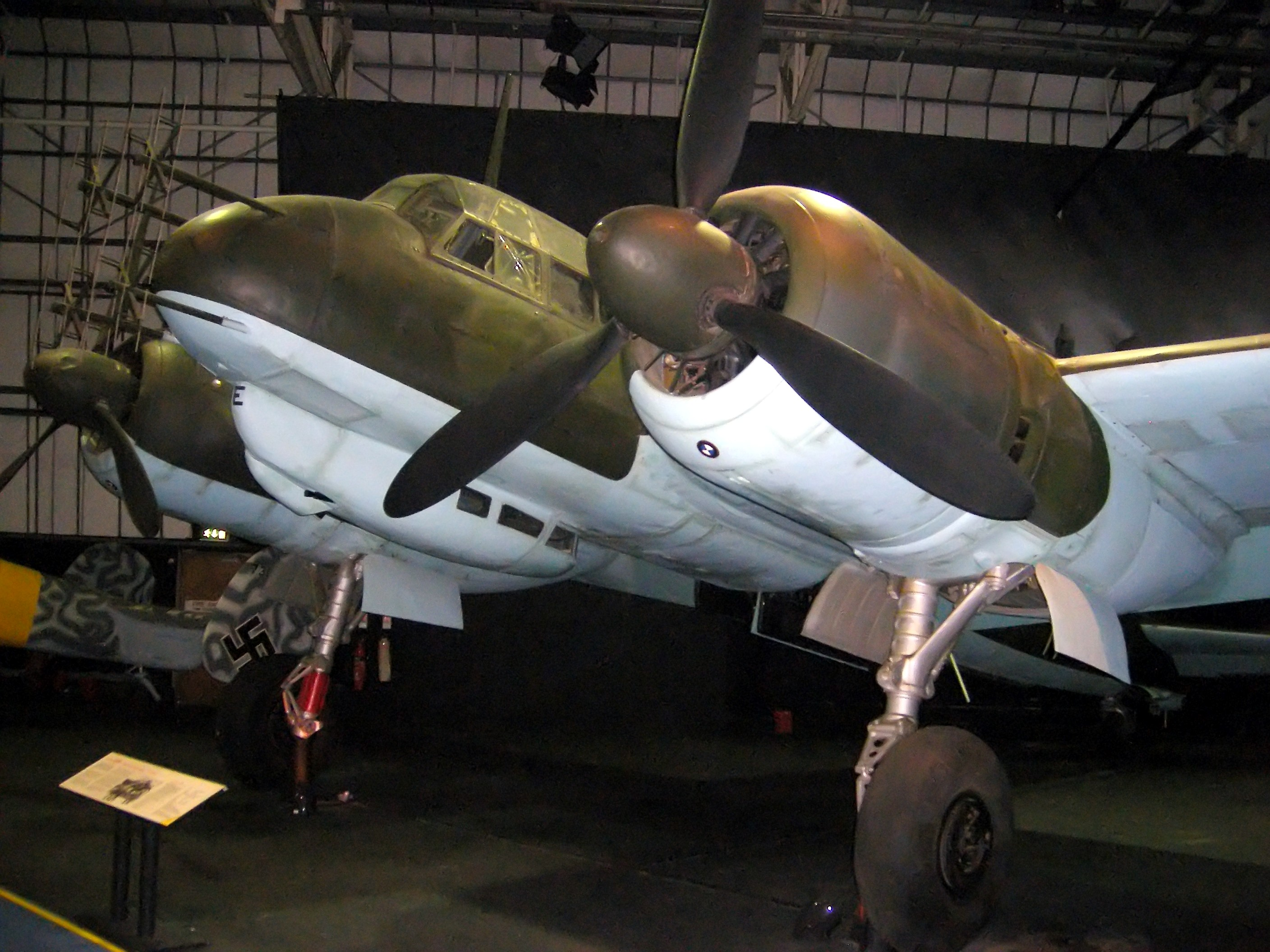
Ju 88 R-1, Werk Nr. 360043, RAF Museum (2007). The aircraft defected in May 1943.

In November 1943 Arthur Harris began the "Battle of Berlin" in the belief the destruction of the German capital would end the war without Operation Overlord, the planned amphibious invasion of France. The battle would end in March 1944, in a defensive victory for the German night fighter force. The introduction of SN-2 radar and the passive Flensburg radar detector helped the Luftwaffe crews. Flensburg had been able to detect the Monica radar emissions which warned RAF crews of an approaching night fighter. Naxos radar detector and the SN-2 radars had proved their worth along with Flensburg. They shrank the British lead in the science of jamming. The Monica radar gave only warning of a fighter within 1,000 metres (3,300 feet) in a 45 degree cone, while Flensburg could detect the bomber from 100 kilometres (62 miles) away. The capture of Monica and "Boozer" early warning receivers in March 1943 allowed the Germans to develop Flensburg. The Monica set was captured a week after its introduction in a major blow for Bomber Command. The capture of a NJG 2 Ju 88 night fighter that landed in England in July 1944 exposed these developments to the British who then developed counter-measures; mainly by stripping the tail radars from their bombers or switching them off.

On 10 October the main body of I./NJG 2 transferred from Parchim to Greifswald, but its period of tenure here was extremely brief; a mere eleven days later, yet another order from above moved the Gruppe to Kassel-Rothwesten. It moved to Kassel and II. Gruppe moved Parchim soon afterwards as the battle began, while III./NJG 2 was spread between Venlo, Schiphol and Neuruppin. III./NJG 2 was brought to Neuruppin to assist with the defence of the capital with support from I./Nachtjagdgeschwader 4 (NJG 4). On 3 December 1943 the Gruppe helped break up the attack on Berlin which cost Bomber Command 30 bombers after the German night fighter direction vessel Togo fed the crews into the bomber stream. The night fighters could not stop 1,800 tons of bombs falling on the city. Bomber Command attempted an alternate target on 20 December, when it bombed Frankfurt. On 24 December Bomber Command lost only 11 bombers and the Luftwaffe six night fighters when fog intervened; NJG 6 could not get off the ground.

Heinrich Prinz zu Sayn-Wittgenstein, commanding NJG 2, was killed in action on the night of the 21 January 1944. At the time of his death, he was the leading night fighter pilot with 83 aerial victories. He had become a victim of a Mosquito night fighter. The "Prince" had been in command just twenty days. His death came 19 days after claiming six RAF bombers in one night, a personal record. All the night fighter wings were active, and they sent 98 bombers up on the night. 35 bombers were shot down. Eight were known to have fallen to artillery fire, 18 to night fighters and nine to unknown circumstances; possibly to Luftwaffe fighters because of their intensive reaction to the raid. The night of the 28/29 January 1944 proved successful for Bomber Command. No. 1 Group RAF laid mines along the sea routes and No. 8 Group RAF bombed coastal targets near Heligoland. The diversions were successful, and only 17–21 bombers were shot down by night fighters from a total loss of 32. NJG 2 and all other wings were active as the bomber stream moved toward Hamburg. On 29/30 January 1944 Bomber Command struck Berlin for the thirteenth time. NJG 2 operated against the bomber stream in the Bremen area. RAF crews reported 150 sightings in the target area and 11 attacks by night fighters. The British lost 43 to all causes; four to ground-fire and 24 to night fighters. On 15/16 February 1944, Bomber Command began its fifteenth raid on Berlin. NJG 2, along with other wings, were ordered to fire green recognition flares upon making contact with the bomber stream. They were warned that many German crews were following in the same stream. Between Magdeburg and Berlin RAF bomber crews reported seeing many green flares. As late at 07:43 CET, NJG 2 crews were being vectored onto the trailing end of the bomber stream. Controllers ordered them north to pursue the withdrawing British between Westmerland and Esbjerg. Bomber Command dropped 2,642 tons of bombs in 39 minutes at a cost of 42 bombers.

Ju 88G-1 from 7./NJG 2 landed in England on 13 July 1944 leading to the capture of SN-2, Naxos and Flensburg devices. This PDF report was written by Squadron Leader H. F. King (click to open)

On 23/24 March 1944, Harris authorised a sixteenth, and final attack upon Berlin. 811 bombers set out, with 147 providing diversion raids to Le Havre in France. No. 105 Squadron RAF sent 12 Mosquitos to Twente, Venlo and Sint Truiden; all home to NJG 1 units. A further 17 Mosquitos were sent on pathfinder operations. NJG 2 and 3 were to plan their interceptions along the transit routes near Sylt. Nachtjagdgeschwader 5 (NJG 5) and NJG 6 were held for operations near the Baltic coast and Berlin and target area. NJG 4 and NJG 1 were apparently reserved for action against the returning bombers. The diversions had little effect. NJG 1, 2 and 3 operated along the bomber stream route all night. Of the 72 aircraft Bomber Command reported lost, 45 were against predictive anti-aircraft fire, 18 to night fighters and nine to unknown causes. The Battle of Berlin cost Bomber Command 497 aircraft with a further 72 crashing in England. Included damaged aircraft the total loss stood at 1,128 bombers. 256 night fighters were lost to all causes.

On 31 March 1944, Bomber Command carried out its single most costly operation during the war when it attacked Nuremberg. Bomber Command had chosen a direct route in favourable weather conditions enabling German night fighters to be fed easily into the bomber stream. Harris direct route took the stream across several night fighter assembly points and the resulting battles left 95 RAF bombers destroyed. II./NJG 2, now based further east at Quakenbrück, Germany scrambled at 23:41 CET and preceded, as ordered, to patrol west of the Ruhr on a southerly course in their fast Ju 88Rs. NJG 2 made contact with the bomber stream and its pilots claimed successes. One Ju 88, piloted by Günther Köberich and his crew, engaged two Lancasters from No. 156 Squadron RAF, flying in close formation. Using the Schräge Musik, he shot one of the pathfinders down. NJG 2 crews claimed 16 bombers during the raid. They were not the most successful. NJG 3, for example, claimed 27.

On 14 May 1944, NJG 2 remained with 3. Jagddivision. Stab/NJG 2 was based at Deelen, I./NJG 2 at Rhein-Main Air Base, II./NJG 2 based at Cologne, III./NJG 2 at Langendiebach. The wing remained at these stations on 25 May 1944. The wing remained with the division through the course of the Normandy Landings and subsequent Battle of Normandy. In 1944, regardless of Harris' objections, Bomber Command had diverted operations to the Transportation Plan in France and Belgium in the lead up to the 6 June invasion. During the summer months, Bomber Command made limited use of window but it did not benefit SN-2 equipped night fighters for the British flew in at such low altitudes it was of limited use. British jamming methods overcame German counter measures within a few days, and after the capture of the SN-2 Ju 88 in July, the German set was practically useless from September. It was a NJG 2 crew that presented the British with the aircraft. Obergefreiter Mäckle, 7. Staffel, was tracking Short Stirling bombers laying mines when the compass malfunctioned the inexperienced crew latched onto a radio beacon they believed to be in the Netherlands. The deception worked and he landed in England.

The Normandy battle ended with Operation Cobra, the simultaneous Battle of Caen leading to the Falaise Pocket. The loss of early warning sites, the jamming of ground radar, AI radar and R/T communications left the night fighter force to "react to every major night raid like a badly battered boxer swinging desperately in the hope of scoring a lucky hit on his opponent." The Allied bombing of oil caused chronic shortages in fuel leaving only the most experienced crews flying while the novices were inactive for weeks on end. The Luftwaffe command planned to make the night fighter force a large part of its aerial defence for any invasion in the west. The night fighter force was ordered to deploy to France and operate at dusk against Allied bomber and transport aircraft. The night fighters were expected to equip with bombs and act as heavy fighter-bombers. British electronic jamming concealed the direction of the invasion force and German forces were taken by surprise. The mass transfer of the NJG 2 never happened. Among those units that did fight were I. and II./NJG 2, which deployed to Chateaudun, Coulommiers and Epinoy. The Jagdwaffe day fighter force collapsed in Normandy due to terrible losses and the night fighters failed to achieve success. In June 1944 the interception rate fell from 4.5 to 2.9 percent. An attempt, as in 1940, for Schwerpunkt, a concentration of effort as decisive points failed. The constant moving lowered the morale of crews.

NJG 2 departed France before the collapse of the front in August 1944. In July, the three Gruppen redeployed from Luftflotte 3 to Luftflotte Reich and made their way to Cologne, Kassel and Langendiebach. NJG 2 remained until the last days of July; Heinz Rökker, Gerhard Raht and Heinz-Horst Hißbach recorded claims as late as the 30 July. The Allied breakout from Normandy in August 1944 destroyed a significant portion of German early warning systems supporting the Kammhuber Line. This weakened day and night defences but did not leave them helpless. German Y-services continued to provide intelligence on impending air attacks. By November 1944 Stab and II. Gruppe were at Cologne, III. Gruppe was placed at Gutersloh and IV./NJG 2 at Grove, Germany. In the event, the latter group did not become operational. All of them were placed under the command of the 3. Jagddivision. Bomber Command refocused its attention on Germany from September 1944, at which point the capture of the NJG 2 Ju 88 began to take effect against the Flensburg and SN-2 radars. Naxos reduced the losses of the Ju 88s, but other types such as the Heinkel He 219, were not fitted with the device and suffered high losses to Mosquito intruders. FuG 240 Berlin, and Neptune radar were developed by the end of the war which were equal too, if not better than the Allied equipment. These radars saw limited service by April 1945. The solutions were a stop-gap, for the future belonged to centimetric radar.

=== 1945: Destruction of the Kammhuber Line ===
The fuel shortage directly impacted the Luftwaffe night fighter defences. Training, already inadequate, was curtailed and the night fighters were not in a position to impose serious losses on Bomber Command after August 1944. In the winter 1944/45, the night fighter force contained 1,355 aircraft. This impressive force was 85 percent operational but the fuel shortages forced it to remain grounded. These problems coincided with Hitler's decision to take the offensive in the west. Germany's rapidly deteriorating military situation necessitated the use of the night fighters in roles for which they were not equipped or trained. In December 1944, the Wehrmacht and Waffen SS began the Ardennes Offensive to split the British and American armies and capture Antwerp. NJG 2 and other units were ordered to provide close air support during the operation, at night. On 14 November 1944, NJG 2, then attached to the 3. Fliegerdivision, received its orders. The wing was ordered to carry out strafing attacks and defend "German deployment", or defend against Allied aerial interdiction operations. On 18 December 1944, the Junkers Ju 87 night groups (NSGr—Nachtschlachtgruppe) were active on the night, NJG 2 were ordered to drop flares to light up the target for the Ju 87s. The crews warily trailed the columns and positions of the 82nd Airborne Division and 101st Airborne Division. The Americans knew of these operations and captured some crews that came to grief. One such pilot from NJG 2, Feldwebel Rudolf Haupt told his captors that he flew two to three sorties during the evening. 6./NJG 2 carried out interdiction against rail traffic the previous night near Charleville. 4./NJG 2 lost Leutnant Wolfram Möckel was captured on 24 December near Hasselt. NJG 2 flew intensively on 26 December losing four Ju 88s. One was lost to the US 422nd Night Fighter Squadron. A dozen NJG 2 Ju 88s patrolled near Chalons and a similar number patrolled over Belgium from 24 to 27 December with the loss of one on each night. 63 night fighters flew over Allied rear areas dropping bombs indiscriminately. 5./NJG 2 lost two Ju 88s. On the night of 1 January 1945, hours after the disastrous Operation Bodenplatte, NJG 2 attacked Liège, Belgium.

At the end of January 1945 Hitler's offensive had failed and German armies were back at their starting point, badly depleted and bereft of fuel. The night fighter force remained in the battle, and achieved some of its final successes in February 1945, but as an organisation it was no longer an effective weapon. Bomber Command's attack on Dresden, supported by the United States Army Air Force (USAAF) and Operation Clarion went virtually unopposed. Just six bombers were lost over Dresden, three of those losses were caused by bombs dropped upon lower flying bombers. Hans Leickhardt, NJG 5, was the only Luftwaffe night fighter pilot to submit a claim on this night. NJG 2 lost Geschwaderkommodore Paul Semrau killed in February during an ill-advised daylight test flight. Semrau was replaced by Wolfgang Thimmig. He was the second and last commanding officer of NJG 2 to die in action.

The last act of major resistance by NJG 2 was Operation Gisela. Crews of NJG 3 and NJG 2 were called to a briefing on Gisela under guard. The crews were told that all available night fighters would participate in an all-out attack against Bomber Command over their airfields in England. The tactical deployment for the operation, they were told, was for two waves of night fighters to cross the coast in the region of Hull. To avoid enemy radar raiders were told to fly at minimum altitude and then climb to 4,500 metres (14,800 feet) as they reached the coast, generally believed to be the average operating height of British bombers. The Luftwaffe Western Front Intelligence Summary Service prepared dossiers for crews to study. It advised on the layout of British airfields and the lighting systems, such as the Drem system, along with funnel lights and angle of glide indicators. Crews were warned about RAF lighting codes on the control towers which warned RAF bomber crews of a possible intruder in the vicinity. NJG 2 claimed eight bombers, claimed by five different pilots.

The Western Allied invasion of Germany was NJG 2's final battle. From February to May 1945 as the Allied armies advanced across Germany Luftwaffe units began to disappear, ground crews being syphoned off in infantry. I Gruppe claimed the final victory of the Geschwader on 27/28 April 1945. Erich Jung accounted for his 30th victory.

== Commanding officers ==
- Oberstleutnant Karl Hülshoff, 1 November 1941 – 31 December 1943
- Major Heinrich Prinz zu Sayn-Wittgenstein, 1 January 1944 – 21 January 1944
- Oberst Günther Radusch, 4 February 1944 – 11 November 1944
- Major Paul Semrau, 12 November 1944 – 8 February 1945
- Oberstleutnant Wolfgang Thimmig, 8 February 1945 – end of war

I. Gruppe

- Hauptmann Karl-Heinrich Heyse, 1 September 1940 – 23 November
- Major Karl Hülshoff, 24 November 1940 – 31 October 1941
- Major Rudolf Jung, 1 November 1941 – December 1943
- Hauptmann Franz Buschmann, December 1943 – January 1944
- Hauptmann Ernst Zechlin, 20 February 1944 – 12 May 1944
- Hauptmann Gerhard Rath, 12 May 1944 – end of war

II. Gruppe

- Major Helmut Lent, 1 November 1941
- Hauptmann Herbert Bönsch, 2 October 1942 – 1 August 1942 †
- Hauptmann Dr. Horst Patuschka, 3 December 1942 – 6 March 1943 †
- Hauptmann Herbert Sewing, 7 March 1943 – December 1943
- Major Heinrich Prinz zu Sayn-Wittgenstein, December 1943 – 1 January 1944
- Major Paul Semrau, 1 January 1944 – 1 November 1944
- Hauptmann Heinz-Horst Hißbach, 1 November 1944 – 14 April 1945
- Hauptmann Franz Brinkhaus, 15 April 1945 – end of war

III. Gruppe

- Hauptmann Herbert Bönsch, 3 April 1942 – 1 August 1942
- Major Paul Semrau, August 1943 – 1 January 1944
- Major Berthold Ney, 1 January 1944 – November 1944
- Hauptmann Heinz Ferger, November 1944 – 10 April 1945
- Hauptmann Hans-Hermann Merker, 11 April 1945 – end of war

IV. Gruppe

- Hauptmann Bengsch, August 1944 – 23 February 1945
