= Neuermark-Lübars =

- Ortsteil of Klietz
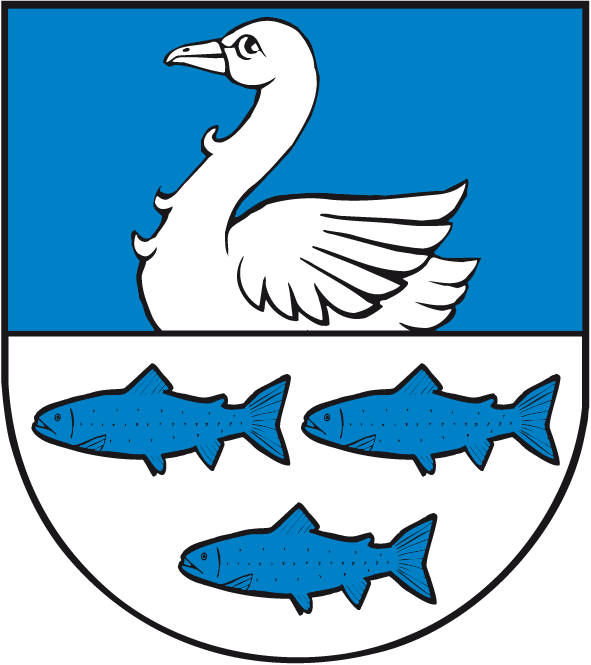
- Coat of arms
- Interactive map of Neuermark-Lübars
- Location within Germany Location within Saxony-Anhalt
- Coordinates: 52°38′35″N 12°02′06″E
- Country: Germany
- State: Saxony-Anhalt
- District: Stendal
- Municipality: Klietz

Area
  - Total: 20.65 km^{2} (7.97 sq mi)
- Elevation: 29 m (95 ft)

Population (2006-12-31)
  - Total: 343
  - Density: 16.6/km^{2} (43.0/sq mi)
- Time zone: UTC+01:00 (CET)
  - Summer (DST): UTC+02:00 (CEST)
- Postal codes: 39524
- Dialling codes: 039327
- Vehicle registration: SDL

Neuermark-Lübars is a village and a former municipality in the district of Stendal, in Saxony-Anhalt, Germany. Since 1 January 2010, it is part of the municipality Klietz.
