= List of Knight's Cross of the Iron Cross recipients (Bn–Bz) =

The Knight's Cross of the Iron Cross (German: Ritterkreuz des Eisernen Kreuzes) and its variants were the highest awards in the military and paramilitary forces of Nazi Germany during World War II. The Knight's Cross of the Iron Cross was awarded for a wide range of reasons and across all ranks, from a senior commander for skilled leadership of his troops in battle to a low-ranking soldier for a single act of extreme gallantry. A total of 7,321 awards were made between its first presentation on 30 September 1939 and its last bestowal on 17 June 1945. (Note: Großadmiral and President of Germany Karl Dönitz, Hitler's successor as Head of State (Staatsoberhaupt) and Supreme Commander of the Armed Forces, had ordered the cessation of all promotions and awards as of 11 May 1945 (Dönitz-decree). Consequently the last Knight's Cross awarded to Oberleutnant zur See of the Reserves Georg-Wolfgang Feller on 17 June 1945 must therefore be considered a de facto but not de jure hand-out.) This number is based on the analysis and acceptance of the order commission of the Association of Knight's Cross Recipients (AKCR). Presentations were made to members of the three military branches of the Wehrmacht—the Heer (Army), Kriegsmarine (Navy) and Luftwaffe (Air Force)—as well as the Waffen-SS, the Reichsarbeitsdienst (RAD—Reich Labour Service) and the Volkssturm (German national militia). There were also 43 recipients in the military forces of allies of the Third Reich.

These recipients are listed in the 1986 edition of Walther-Peer Fellgiebel's book, Die Träger des Ritterkreuzes des Eisernen Kreuzes 1939–1945 [The Bearers of the Knight's Cross of the Iron Cross 1939–1945]. Fellgiebel was the former chairman and head of the order commission of the AKCR. In 1996, the second edition of this book was published with an addendum delisting 11 of these original recipients. Author Veit Scherzer has cast doubt on a further 193 of these listings. The majority of the disputed recipients had been nominated for the award in 1945, when the deteriorating situation of Germany during the final days of World War II left a number of nominations incomplete and pending in various stages of the approval process.

Listed here are the 357 Knight's Cross recipients of the Wehrmacht and Waffen-SS whose last name is in the range "Bn–Bz". Fellgiebel himself delisted one and Scherzer has challenged the validity of eight more of these listings. This is the second of two lists of all 725 Knight's Cross of the Iron Cross recipients whose last name starts with "B". The recipients whose last name is in the range "Ba–Bm" is listed at List of Knight's Cross of the Iron Cross recipients (Ba–Bm). The recipients are initially ordered alphabetically by last name. The rank listed is the recipient's rank at the time the Knight's Cross was awarded.

== Background ==
The Knight's Cross of the Iron Cross and its higher grades were based on four separate enactments. The first enactment, Reichsgesetzblatt I S. 1573 of 1 September 1939 instituted the Iron Cross (Eisernes Kreuz), the Knight's Cross of the Iron Cross and the Grand Cross of the Iron Cross (Großkreuz des Eisernen Kreuzes). Article 2 of the enactment mandated that the award of a higher class be preceded by the award of all preceding classes. As the war progressed, some of the recipients of the Knight's Cross distinguished themselves further and a higher grade, the Knight's Cross of the Iron Cross with Oak Leaves (Ritterkreuz des Eisernen Kreuzes mit Eichenlaub), was instituted. The Oak Leaves, as they were commonly referred to, were based on the enactment Reichsgesetzblatt I S. 849 of 3 June 1940. In 1941, two higher grades of the Knight's Cross were instituted. The enactment Reichsgesetzblatt I S. 613 of 28 September 1941 introduced the Knight's Cross of the Iron Cross with Oak Leaves and Swords (Ritterkreuz des Eisernen Kreuzes mit Eichenlaub und Schwertern) and the Knight's Cross of the Iron Cross with Oak Leaves, Swords and Diamonds (Ritterkreuz des Eisernen Kreuzes mit Eichenlaub, Schwertern und Brillanten). At the end of 1944 the final grade, the Knight's Cross of the Iron Cross with Golden Oak Leaves, Swords, and Diamonds (Ritterkreuz des Eisernen Kreuzes mit goldenem Eichenlaub, Schwertern und Brillanten), based on the enactment Reichsgesetzblatt 1945 I S. 11 of 29 December 1944, became the final variant of the Knight's Cross authorized.

== Recipients ==
Knight's Cross of the Iron Cross (Bn–Bz)
Service	Number of presentations	Posthumous presentations
Heer	246	14
Kriegsmarine	17	1
Luftwaffe	78	7
Waffen-SS	16	0

The Oberkommando der Wehrmacht (Supreme Command of the Armed Forces) kept separate Knight's Cross lists, one for each of the three military branches, Heer (Army), Kriegsmarine (Navy), Luftwaffe (Air Force) and for the Waffen-SS. Within each of these lists a unique sequential number was assigned to each recipient. The same numbering paradigm was applied to the higher grades of the Knight's Cross, one list per grade. Of the 357 awards made to servicemen whose last name is in the range "Bn–Bz", 35 were later awarded the Knight's Cross of the Iron Cross with Oak Leaves, six the Knight's Cross of the Iron Cross with Oak Leaves and Swords and one the Knight's Cross of the Iron Cross with Oak Leaves, Swords and Diamonds; 22 presentations were made posthumously. Heer members received 246 of the medals; 17 went to the Kriegsmarine, 78 to the Luftwaffe, and 16 to the Waffen-SS. The sequential numbers greater than 843 for the Knight's Cross of the Iron Cross with Oak Leaves and 143 for the Knight's Cross of the Iron Cross with Oak Leaves and Swords are unofficial and were assigned by the Association of Knight's Cross Recipients (AKCR) and are therefore denoted in parentheses.

This along with the + (plus) indicates that a higher grade of Knight's Cross was awarded as well.
This along with the * (asterisk) indicates that the Knight's Cross was awarded posthumously.
This along with the ! (exclamation mark) indicates that author Walther-Peer Fellgiebel has expressed doubt regarding the veracity or formal correctness of the listing.
This along with the ? (question mark) indicates that historian Veit Scherzer has expressed doubt regarding the veracity or formal correctness of the listing.

Name	Service	Rank	Role and unit (Note: For an explanation of the various naming schemes used by the Luftwaffe, Heer, Kriegsmarine and Waffen-SS refer to nomenclature used by the Wehrmacht and Waffen-SS.)	Date of award	Notes	Image
Hans-Ekkehard Bob	Luftwaffe	Oberleutnant	Staffelkapitän of the 9./Jagdgeschwader 54	7 March 1941	—	
Reinhold Bobbe	Heer	Hauptmann	Commander of the I./Grenadier-Regiment 870	23 March 1945	—	—
Richard Bochentin	Heer	Major	Commander of the II./Grenadier-Regiment 405	12 February 1944	—	—
Georg Bochmann+	Waffen-SS	SS-Hauptsturmführer	Commander of SS-Panzer-Jäger-Abteilung "Totenkopf" (Note: According to Scherzer as leader of SS "Totenkopf"-Panzer-Jäger-Abteilung.)	3 May 1942	Awarded 246th Oak Leaves 17 May 1943; 140th Swords 26 March 1945	A black-and-white photograph of a man wearing a military uniform and neck order in shape of an Iron Cross. His hair is combed back and his facial expression is determined.
Helmut Bochnig	Heer	Major	Commander of Panzer-Jäger-Abteilung 228	9 June 1944	—	—
Albert Bock	Luftwaffe	Stabsfeldwebel	Observer in the Stab/Sturzkampfgeschwader 2 "Immelmann"	4 September 1941	—	—
Fedor von Bock	Heer	Generaloberst	Commander-in-Chief of Heeresgruppe Nord	30 September 1939	—	A portray of a man wearing a military uniform and peaked cap.
Friedrich-Wilhelm Bock+	Waffen-SS	SS-Obersturmführer and Oberstleutnant of the Schupo	Commander of the II./SS-Polizei-Artillerie-Regiment 4	28 March 1943	Awarded 570th Oak Leaves 2 September 1944	—
Hans Bock	Heer	Hauptmann	Commander of schwere Panzer-Abteilung "Großdeutschland"	5 February 1945	—	—
Karl Bock	Heer	Hauptmann of the Reserves	Commander of the III./Infanterie-Regiment 97	3 May 1942	—	—
Engelbert Bockhoff	Heer	Hauptmann	Commander of Panzer-Aufklärungs-Abteilung 9	18 November 1943	—	—
Oskar von Boddien+	Heer	Oberstleutnant	Commander of Divisions-Aufklärungs-Abteilung 22 (Note: According to Scherzer as commander of Aufklärungs-Abteilung 22.)	2 October 1941	Awarded 58th Oak Leaves 8 January 1942	—
Helmuth Bode	Luftwaffe	Hauptmann	Gruppenkommandeur of the III./Sturzkampfgeschwader 77	10 October 1941	—	—
Kurt Bodendörfer	Heer	Major	Leader of Grenadier-Regiment 689	14 February 1945	—	—
Erpo Freiherr von Bodenhausen	Heer	Generalmajor	Commander of the 12. Panzer-Division	17 December 1943	—	—
Hermann Böbel	Heer	Obergefreiter	Zugführer (platoon leader) in the 1./Divisions-Füsilier-Bataillon 88	18 February 1944	—	—
Wilhelm Böck	Heer	Oberst	Commander of Artillerie-Regiment 176	20 January 1943	—	—
Dr.-jur. Hermann Böckel	Heer	Oberst of the Reserves	Commander of Grenadier-Regiment 688	12 August 1944	—	—
Heinrich Boecker	Luftwaffe	Hauptmann	Staffelkapitän of the 12.(K)/Lehrgeschwader 1	29 February 1944	—	—
Hans Boeckh-Behrens	Heer	Generalleutnant	Commander of the 32. Infanterie-Division	9 December 1944	—	—
Herbert von Böckmann	Heer	Generalleutnant	Commander of the 11. Infanterie-Division	4 December 1941	—	—
Dr. phil. Rudolf Boeckmann	Heer	Major of the Reserves	Commander of schwere Artillerie-Abteilung 408	23 July 1942	—	—
Heinz Bödicker	Heer	Hauptmann of the Reserves	Leader of Panzer-Pionier-Bataillon 209	9 January 1944	—	—
Ehrenfried-Oskar Boege+	Heer	Oberst	Commander of Infanterie-Regiment 7	22 December 1941	Awarded 594th Oak Leaves 21 September 1944	
Hermann Bögel	Kriegsmarine	Leutnant zur See of the Reserves	Commander of Minensucher M-4040	13 October 1942	—	—
Rudolf Boehlein	Luftwaffe	Oberleutnant	Chief of the 2./Fallschirmjäger-Regiment 4 (Note: According to Scherzer as a company leader in the I./Fallschirmjäger-Regiment 4.)	30 November 1944	—	—
Hellmuth Böhlke+	Heer	Oberst	Commander of Infanterie-Regiment 430	24 September 1942	Awarded 716th Oak Leaves 25 January 1945	—
Ernst Böhm	Luftwaffe	Hauptmann	Chief of the 2./Flak-Regiment 241 (motorized)	20 June 1943	—	—
Fritz Böhm	Heer	Oberfeldwebel	Zugführer (platoon leader) in the 6./Panzer-Regiment 26	23 August 1944	—	—
Walter Böhm	Heer	Oberfeldwebel	Spähtruppführer (reconnaissance patrol leader) in the 1./Panzer-Aufklärungs-Abteilung 8	17 March 1945	—	—
Franz Böhme	Heer	Generalleutnant	Commander of the 32. Infanterie-Division	29 June 1940	—	A black-and-white photograph of a man with glasses wearing a military uniform underneath a fur collared coat, field cap and neck order in shape of an Iron Cross.
Friedrich Böhme	Kriegsmarine	Kapitän zur See	Einsatzleiter der Kriegsmarine-Kleinkampfmittel in Frankreich (Head of operations of the small naval forces in France) (Note: According to Scherzer as Kommandant der Kleinkampfmittel in Frankreich (Commander of operations of the small naval forces in France).)	26 August 1944	—	—
Herbert Böhme	Heer	Major	Commander of the III./Infanterie-Regiment 28	19 July 1940	—	—
Hans Boehmer	Heer	Rittmeister	Commander of Aufklärungs-Abteilung 238	10 September 1943	—	—
Kurt Böhmer	Kriegsmarine	Kapitän zur See	Chef des Stabes Befehlshaber der Sicherung der Nordsee (Chief of Staff of the commander of the security of the North Sea)	6 October 1940	—	—
Leopold Böhmer	Heer	Major (Note: According to Scherzer as Major zur Verwendung (for disposition).)	Commander of the III./Infanterie-Regiment 270	13 July 1940	—	—
Reinhold Böhmke	Heer	Oberfeldwebel	Zugführer (platoon leader) in the 13.(Infanteriegeschütz)/Grenadier-Regiment 162 (Note: According to Scherzer as a Zugführer (platoon leader) in the 13./Grenadier-Regiment 162.)	6 April 1944	—	—
Rudolf Böhmler	Luftwaffe	Major	Commander of the I./Fallschirmjäger-Regiment 3	26 March 1944	—	—
Max Böhrendt	Heer	Oberleutnant	Flugabwehr (anti-aircraft) Zugführer (platoon leader) in the Stabskompanie/Grenadier-Regiment "Großdeutschland"	8 February 1943	—	—
Dr.jur. Dr.rer.pol. Hans Boelsen	Heer	Oberst	Commander of Panzergrenadier-Regiment 111	17 September 1943	—	—
Johannes Bölter+	Heer	Leutnant	Zugführer (platoon leader) in the 1./schwere Panzer-Abteilung 502	16 April 1944	Awarded 581st Oak Leaves 10 September 1944	—
Georg Böhnk	Heer	Oberleutnant	Leader of the II./Panzer-Füsilier-Regiment "Großdeutschland"	18 February 1945	—	—
Walter Boenicke	Luftwaffe	Generalleutnant	Commander of the 3. Flieger-Division	14 May 1944	—	—
Georg Böning	Heer	Fahnenjunker-Oberfeldwebel	Zugführer (platoon leader) in the 13.(IG)/Grenadier-Regiment 412 (Note: According to Scherzer as a Zugführer (platoon leader) in the 13./Grenadier-Regiment 412.)	27 August 1944	—	—
Johannes de Boer	Heer	Oberstleutnant	Commander of Artillerie-Regiment 22	19 June 1940	—	—
Ernst Börngen	Luftwaffe	Hauptmann	Staffelkapitän of the 5./Jagdgeschwader 27 (Note: According to Scherzer on 27 July 1944 as Gruppenkommandeur of the I./Jagdgeschwader 27.)	3 August 1944	—	—
Alwin Boerst+	Heer	Oberleutnant	Pilot in the 3./Sturzkampfgeschwader 2 "Immelmann"	5 October 1941	Awarded 149th Oak Leaves 28 November 1942; 61st Swords 6 April 1944	—
Otto Bösel	Luftwaffe	Wachtmeister	Geschützführer (gun layer) in the 2./Flak-Regiment 43 (motorized) (Note: According to Scherzer in the Geschützführer (gun layer) in the 2./Flak-Regiment 43.)	11 June 1944	—	—
Georg Freiherr von Boeselager+	Heer	Oberleutnant	Chief of the 1.(reit)/Divisions-Aufklärungs-Abteilung 6 (Note: According to Scherzer as chief of the 1./Divisions-Aufklärungs-Abteilung 6.)	18 January 1941	Awarded 53rd Oak Leaves 31 December 1941; 114th Swords 28 November 1944	—
Philipp Freiherr von Boeselager	Heer	Major	Commander of the I./Kavallerie-Regiment Mitte	20 July 1944	—	
Karl Böttcher	Heer	Generalmajor	Commander of the 21. Panzer-Division	13 December 1941	—	
Kurt Boettcher	Heer	Major	Commander of the I./Artillerie-Regiment 27 (motorized)	4 September 1941	—	—
Kurt Böttcher	Heer	Major	Commander of Pionier-Bataillon 44	21 February 1943	—	—
Paul Böttcher	Heer	Oberwachtmeister	Squadron leader in the 2. Marschkompanie/Feldersatz-Abteilung 89 (Note: According to Scherzer as a leader in the 2. Schwadron/Feldersatz-Abteilung 89.)	30 September 1944	—	—
Walther-Hans Böttcher	Heer	Oberleutnant	Leader of the I./Grenadier-Regiment 216 (Note: According to Scherzer with Grenadier-Regiment 167, assigned to Grenadier-Regiment 216 as a battalion leader (leader I. Bataillon).)	8 February 1943	—	—
Johannes Böwe	Heer	Hauptmann of the Reserves	Chief of the 14.(Panzerjäger)/Grenadier-Regiment 397 (Note: According to Scherzer as chief of the 14./Grenadier-Regiment 397.)	11 December 1943	—	—
Wolfgang Böwing-Treuding	Luftwaffe	Oberleutnant	Staffelführer of the 10./Jagdgeschwader 51 "Mölders" (Note: According to Scherzer as Staffelkapitän of the 10./Jagdgeschwader 51 "Mölders".)	24 March 1943*	Killed in action 11 February 1943	—
Wilhelm Boffer	Heer	Major of the Reserves	Leader of Grenadier-Regiment 1039	16 October 1944	—	—
Rudolf Bogatsch	Luftwaffe	General der Flieger	General der Luftwaffe beim Oberbefehlshaber des Heeres (Note: According to Scherzer as General der Luftwaffe beim Oberbefehlshaber des Heeres und Inspekteur der Aufklärenden-Flieger im Reichsluftfahrtministerium (General of the Luftwaffe with the Supreme High Command of the German Army and Inspector of the Reconnaissance Flyers with the Ministry of Aviation).)	20 March 1942	—	—
Bruno Bogert	Heer	Hauptmann of the Reserves	Commander of Sicherungs-Bataillon 670	21 April 1944	—	—
Helmut Bohlens	Luftwaffe	Oberleutnant	Pilot in the 5./Fernaufklärungs-Gruppe 122 (Note: According to Scherzer on 9 October 1943 as a pilot in the Aufklärungsstaffel 1.(F)/122.)	21 June 1943*	Killed in action 19 April 1943	—
Erwin Bohlken	Heer	Feldwebel	Zugführer (platoon leader) in the 1./Panzer-Regiment 1	17 March 1945	—	—
Theodor Bohlmann-Combrinck	Heer	Oberst	Commander of Schützen-Regiment 111	8 August 1941	—	—
Wolfgang Bohn	Heer	Hauptmann	Commander of the III./Panzergrenadier-Regiment 8	9 December 1944	—	—
Hans Bohnenkamp	Heer	Major of the Reserves	Commander of the III./Artillerie-Regiment 295	22 January 1943	—	—
Wilhelm Bohnstedt	Heer	Generalmajor	Commander of the 32. Infanterie-Division	13 October 1941	—	—
Heinrich Boigk+	Heer	Oberjäger	Group leader of the 2./Jäger-Regiment 49	5 May 1943	Awarded 370th Oak Leaves 18 January 1944	
Hans Reichsfreiherr von Boineburg-Lengsfeld	Heer	Oberst	Commander of the 4. Schützen-Brigade	19 July 1940	—	—
Arthur Boje	Heer	Oberst	Commander of Infanterie-Regiment 134	5 February 1942	—	—
Johannes Boje	Heer	Oberst	Commander of Grenadier-Regiment 37	11 January 1944	—	—
Dipl.-Ing. Ernst Bolbrinker	Heer	Major	Commander of the I./Panzer-Regiment 5	15 May 1941	—	—
Gerhard Boldt	Heer	Oberleutnant of the Reserves	Leader of the 3./Divisions-Aufklärungs-Abteilung 158 (Note: According to Scherzer as leader of the 3./Aufklärungs-Abteilung 158.)	18 April 1943	—	—
Burghardt Bollmann	Heer	Hauptmann of the Reserves	Commander of the I./Grenadier-Regiment 1038	5 November 1944*	Killed in action 21 October 1944	—
Fred Bollmann	Luftwaffe	Major of the Reserves	Gruppenkommandeur of the III./Kampfgeschwader 55	29 October 1944	—	—
Hermann-Ernst Bolm	Heer	Hauptmann of the Reserves	Leader of the II./Grenadier-Regiment 434	20 April 1944	—	—
Walter von Boltenstern	Heer	Generalmajor	Commander of the 29. Infanterie-Division (motorized)	13 August 1941	—	—
[Dr.] Hans Bonath (Note: The brackets around the doctor title [Dr.] denotes that the academic title was attained after the Knight's Cross of the Iron Cross was awarded.)	Luftwaffe	Oberleutnant	Staffelkapitän of the Wettererkundungsstaffel 27	26 March 1944	—	—
Hans Bonertz	Heer	Hauptmann	Leader of the III./Infanterie-Regiment 46	27 March 1942	—	—
Dietrich-Siegwart von Bonin	Heer	Rittmeister of the Reserves	Commander of the I./Panzergrenadier-Regiment 21	18 February 1945	—	—
Eckart-Wilhelm von Bonin	Luftwaffe	Hauptmann	Gruppenkommandeur of the II./Nachtjagdgeschwader 1	5 February 1944	—	—
Hubertus von Bonin	Luftwaffe	Major	Gruppenkommandeur of the III./Jagdgeschwader 52	21 December 1942	—	—
Georg Bonk+	Heer	Obergefreiter	Machine gunner in the 6./Grenadier-Regiment 365	17 August 1943	Awarded 492nd Oak Leaves 9 June 1944	—
Friedrich Bonnke	Luftwaffe	Oberleutnant	Chief of the 3./Flak-Regiment 42 (motorized)	6 December 1944	—	—
Friedrich Bonte	Kriegsmarine	Kapitän zur See	Führer der Zerstörer (leader of the destroyers) and of Kampfgruppe Narvik	17 October 1940*	Killed in action 10 April 1940	—
Wilhelm Book	Heer	Oberleutnant	Leader of the 10./Infanterie-Regiment 6	26 November 1941	—	—
Johann Boos	Luftwaffe	Oberfeldwebel	Pilot in the 9./Kampfgeschwader 55 (Note: According to Scherzer as a pilot in the 9.(Eis)/Kampfgeschwader 55.)	9 October 1943	—	—
Joachim Boosfeld	Waffen-SS	SS-Obersturmführer	Chief of the 4./SS-Kavallerie-Regiment 16 "Florian Geyer" (Note: According to Scherzer as chief of the 4./SS-Kavallerie-Regiment 16.)	21 February 1945	—	—
Alfred Bopp	Heer	Oberleutnant	Chief of the 9./Infanterie-Regiment 216	21 December 1940	—	
Alhard Freiherr von der Borch	Heer	Rittmeister	Commander of Panzer-Aufklärungs-Abteilung 115	19 August 1944	—	—
Erich Borchardt	Heer	Oberfeldwebel	Leader of the 1./Grenadier-Regiment 122	17 March 1944	—	—
Helmut Borchardt+	Heer	Unteroffizier	Group leader of the 2./Grenadier-Regiment 409	30 April 1943	Awarded 828th Oak Leaves 14 April 1945	—
Herbert Borchardt	Heer	Leutnant of the Reserves	Shock troops leader in the 7./Grenadier-Regiment 189	20 March 1944	—	—
Robert Borchardt	Heer	Hauptmann	Chief of the Panzerspäh-Kompanie/Aufklärungs-Abteilung (motorized) 341	23 August 1941	—	—
Adolf Borchers	Luftwaffe	Hauptmann	Staffelkapitän of the 11./Jagdgeschwader 51 "Mölders"	22 November 1943	—	—
Hermann Borchers	Waffen-SS	SS-Hauptsturmführer	Leader of the I./SS-Panzergrenadier-Regiment 19 "Hohenstaufen" (Note: According to Scherzer as leader of the I./SS-Panzergrenadier-Regiment 19.)	16 October 1944	—	—
Walter Borchers	Luftwaffe	Major	Geschwaderkommodore of Nachtjagdgeschwader 5 (Note: According to Scherzer on 29 October 1944 as Gruppenkommandeur of the III./Nachtjagdgeschwader 5.)	27 July 1944	—	—
Ernst Borchert	Heer	Oberleutnant	Chief of the 1./Infanterie-Regiment 29 (motorized)	29 September 1941	—	—
Wilhelm Borchert	Heer	Hauptmann of the Reserves	Leader of the III./Grenadier-Regiment 121 (Note: According to Scherzer as leader of the 3./Grenadier-Regiment 121.)	11 March 1943	—	
Hans-Georg Borck	Heer	Oberleutnant of the Reserves	Chief of the 3./Panzer-Pionier-Bataillon 209	23 December 1943	—	—
Walter Bordellé	Luftwaffe	Oberleutnant	Pilot in the 5./Transportgeschwader 2	26 March 1944	—	—
Eberhard von Boremski	Luftwaffe	Oberfeldwebel	Pilot in the 7./Jagdgeschwader 3 "Udet" (Note: According to Scherzer as a pilot in the 9./Jagdgeschwader 3 "Udet".)	3 May 1942	—	—
Heinrich Borgmann+	Heer	Oberleutnant	Chief of the 9./Infanterie-Regiment 46	19 July 1940	Awarded 71st Oak Leaves 11 February 1942	—
Max Bork? (Note: Max Bork's nomination by his unit was received by the Heerespersonalamt (HPA—Army Staff Office) on 13 April 1945 via the Reichsführer-SS. Major Joachim Domaschk requested the explanatory statement from the Commander-in-Chief of AOK 1 via teleprinter message on 14 April 1945. He renewed his request on 5 May 1945. Domasck noted this in the book of "Verliehene Ritterkreuze" (Awarded Knight Crosses). In parallel the HPA received a second nomination by his unit, approved by all intermittent commanding officers, on 28 April 1945. This nomination apparently never made it to Major Domaschk. Both nominations by his unit fail to indicate further evidence that the nomination was processed or approved. The presentation date is an assumption of the Association of Knight's Cross Recipients (AKCR). Bork was a member of the AKCR.)	Heer	Generalleutnant	Commanding general of Korps "Bork" (Note: According to Scherzer as commander of the 47. Volksgrenadier Division.)	11 May 1945	—	—
Dr.-Ing. Ernst Bormann+	Luftwaffe	Oberstleutnant	Geschwaderkommodore of Kampfgeschwader 76	5 October 1941	Awarded 119th Oak Leaves 3 September 1942	
Ernst Born	Heer	Feldwebel	Zugführer (platoon leader) in the 7./Grenadier-Regiment 2	21 April 1944*	Killed in action 27 March 1944	—
[Dr.] Heinrich Born	Heer	Oberleutnant	Leader of the 4./Panzergrenadier-Regiment 104	14 April 1945	—	—
Gerd von Born-Fallois	Heer	Major	Commander of Panzer-Aufklärungs-Lehr-Abteilung 130	2 January 1945	—	A black-and-white photograph of a smiling man wearing a military uniform and neck order in shape of an Iron Cross. His hair is combed back.
Rolf Bornemann	Luftwaffe	Leutnant (Note: According to Scherzer as Leutnant of the Reserves and aide-de-camp in the Stab I./Flaksturm-Regiment 5.)	In the Stab I./Flaksturm-Regiment 5 (motorized)	17 April 1945	—	—
Rudolf Bornhof	Heer	Leutnant of the Reserves	Leader of the 1./Jäger-Regiment 38	3 May 1942	—	—
Walter Bornschein	Luftwaffe	Oberleutnant	Pilot in the II./Kampfgeschwader 2	24 September 1942	—	A portray of a man wearing a military uniform, side cap and neck order in shape of an Iron Cross.
Willibald Borowietz+	Heer	Oberstleutnant	Commander of Schützen-Regiment 10	24 July 1941	Awarded 235th Oak Leaves 10 May 1943	—
Hermann von Borries	Heer	Oberstleutnant	Leader of Infanterie-Regiment 46	3 May 1942	—	—
Karl Borris	Luftwaffe	Major	Gruppenkommandeur of the I./Jagdgeschwader 26 "Schlageter"	25 November 1944	—	—
Joachim Borrmann	Heer	Hauptmann	Commander of the III./Grenadier-Regiment 427	13 October 1943	—	—
Georg Bose	Heer	Leutnant	Zugführer (platoon leader) in the 1./Sturmgeschütz-Abteilung 177	21 September 1944	—	—
Jobst-Hilmar von Bose	Heer	Oberstleutnant (Note: According to Scherzer as Oberstleutnant (Ergänzungsoffizier—supplementary officer).)	Commander of the I./Infanterie-Regiment 289	4 December 1941	—	—
Karl-Heinz Boska	Waffen-SS	SS-Obersturmführer	Adjutant of the II./SS-Panzer-Regiment 2 "Das Reich" (Note: According to Scherzer as adjutant of the II./SS-Panzer-Regiment 2.)	16 December 1943	—	—
Wolfgang von Bostell+	Heer	Leutnant	Zugführer (platoon leader) in the Panzerjäger-Sturmgeschütz-Kompanie 1023 (Note: According to Scherzer as Zugführer (platoon leader) of the I. Zug/Sturmgeschütz-Abteilung 1023 in the Panzerjäger-Abteilung 23.)	2 September 1944	Awarded (859th) Oak Leaves 30 April 1945	—
Kuno-Hans von Both	Heer	General der Infanterie	Commanding general of the I. Armeekorps	9 July 1941	—	A man wearing a military uniform and peaked cap with two military orders at the front of his uniform collar.
Paul Both	Heer	Feldwebel	Zugführer (platoon leader) in the 3./Grenadier-Regiment 411	23 December 1942	—	—
Walter Botsch? (Note: Walter Botsch's nomination by his unit was already received by the Heerespersonalamt (HPA—Army Staff Office) on 27 October 1944, forwarded for approval on 3 November 1944 and apparently deferred. The file card notes in the field for the presentation: "see folder for further leadership reports". A second nomination by his unit, most likely related to a different act of bravery or leadership skills, according to the file card was received by the HPA on 5 April 1945. The book of "Verliehene Ritterkreuze" (Awarded Knight Crosses) states "deferred" because Botsch was considered missing in action on 16 April 1945. A nomination of the HPA with number 5082 was created. According to the Association of Knight's Cross Recipients (AKCR) the award was presented in accordance with the Dönitz-decree. This is illegal according to the Deutsche Dienststelle (WASt) and lacks legal justification. The presentation date was assigned by Walther-Peer Fellgiebel.)	Heer	Generalleutnant	Acting leader of the LVIII. Panzerkorps (Note: According to Scherzer as commanding general of the LIII. Armeekorps.)	9 May 1945	—	—
Alfred Bottler	Heer	Major	Commander of the I./Grenadier-Regiment 200 (motorized)	3 November 1944	—	—
Albrecht von Boxberg	Heer	Major	Commander of the II./Panzer-Regiment 3	7 February 1944	—	—
Günter Braake	Heer	Oberleutnant	Deputy leader of the I./Grenadier-Regiment 422	27 August 1944	—	—
Albert Brachat	Heer	Feldwebel	Zugführer (platoon leader) in the 1./Infanterie-Regiment 14	4 July 1940	—	—
Dr.-agrar. Hermann Bracher	Heer	Oberst	Commander of Grenadier-Regiment 460	23 August 1943	—	—
Dr.-jur. Bruno Freiherr von Brackel	Heer	Oberleutnant	Leader of the 3./Panzer-Regiment 15	23 August 1941*	Killed in action 13 August 1941	—
Ernst-Joachim Bradel	Heer	Oberstleutnant	Commander of Panzergrenadier-Regiment 113	15 December 1943	—	—
Walter Bradel	Luftwaffe	Hauptmann	Staffelkapitän of the 9./Kampfgeschwader 2	17 September 1941	—	
Kurt Brändle+	Luftwaffe	Hauptmann	Gruppenkommandeur of the II./Jagdgeschwader 3 "Udet"	1 July 1942	Awarded 114th Oak Leaves 27 August 1942	
Bruno Bräuer	Luftwaffe	Oberst	Commander of Fallschjäger-Regiment 1	24 May 1940	—	—
Kai Bräundle-Schmidt	Heer	Hauptmann of the Reserves	Regiment adjutant of Grenadier-Regiment 501 (Note: According to Scherzer as adjutant of Grenadier-Regiment 501.)	26 March 1944	—	—
Otto Brakat	Heer	Unteroffizier	Group leader in the 2./Radfahr-Abteilung 1	27 July 1941	—	—
Bernhard Brambrink	Heer	Oberleutnant	Leader of the 2./Pionier-Bataillon 97	1 September 1943	—	—
Heinrich Bramesfeld	Kriegsmarine	Kapitän zur See	Leader of the 2. Sicherungs-Division	21 January 1943	—	—
Hans-Joachim Brand	Luftwaffe	Oberleutnant	Staffelkapitän of the 1./Sturzkampfgeschwader 77	5 December 1943	—	—
Erich Brandenberger+	Heer	Generalmajor	Commander of the 8. Panzer-Division	15 July 1941	Awarded 324th Oak Leaves 12 November 1943	
Johannes Brandenburg	Luftwaffe	Oberleutnant	Staffelführer of the 2./Sturzkampfgeschwader 2 "Immelmann" (Note: According to Scherzer as Staffelführer of the 2./Sturzkampfgeschwader 2.)	18 September 1940	—	—
Max Brandenburg	Luftwaffe	Feldwebel	Pilot in the 5./Kampfgeschwader 101	11 June 1944	—	—
Ernst Brandes	Heer	Leutnant of the Reserves	Leader of the 6./Grenadier-Regiment 9	5 March 1945	—	—
Walter Brandes	Heer	Hauptmann	Commander of the II./Panzer-Regiment 25	28 October 1944	—	—
Albrecht Brandi+	Kriegsmarine	Kapitänleutnant	Commander of U-617	21 January 1943	Awarded 224th Oak Leaves 11 April 1943; 66th Swords 9 May 1944; 22nd Diamonds 24 November 1944	Man in navy uniform
Josef Brandner+	Heer	Hauptmann	Commander of Sturmgeschütz-Brigade 912 (Note: According to Scherzer as commander of Heeres-Sturmartillerie-Brigade 912.)	17 March 1943	Awarded (846th) Oak Leaves 26 April 1945? (Note: No evidence of the award can be found in the German Federal Archives. According to Josef Brandner's own account he received the Oak Leaves from the commanding general of the XXXVIII. Armeekorps, General der Artillerie Kurt Herzog in the Courland Pocket. He did not mention a date for the presentation. Presumably pictures showing him with Oak Leaves exist. The Association of Knight's Cross Recipients (AKCR) assumes a direct presentation from Berlin. The presentation date is also an assumption by the AKCR. A presentation of the Oak Leaves only four to five weeks after the Knight's Cross of the Iron Cross is very unlikely. The German Federal Archives holds numerous records of nominations which have been rejected on the grounds that a high-ranking military award had just been presented. Brandner was a member of the AKCR.)	—
Kaspar Brandner	Heer	Oberjäger	Group leader in the 8./Gebirgsjäger-Regiment 91	28 October 1944	—	—
Franz Brandt	Heer	Oberfeldwebel	Shock troops leader in the II./Grenadier-Regiment 953	30 September 1944	—	—
Friedrich Brandt	Heer	Oberleutnant	Chief of the 3./Panzer-Pionier-Bataillon 39	20 August 1942	—	—
Gerhard Brandt	Heer	Oberleutnant	Chief of the 1./Sturmgeschütz-Brigade 202	12 December 1944	—	—
Dr.-med. Günther Brandt	Kriegsmarine	Korvettenkapitän of the Reserves	Chief of the 21. U-Jagd-Flottille	23 December 1943	—	—
Hans-Georg Brandt	Heer	Oberstleutnant	Leader of Infanterie-Regiment 577	22 January 1943*	Killed in action 4 January 1943	—
Hans-Otto Brandt	Heer	Leutnant (Note: According to Scherzer as Leutnant of the Reserves.)	Zugführer (platoon leader) in the 10./Infanterie-Regiment 67	21 August 1941	—	—
Heinz Brandt	Heer	Stabsfeldwebel	Zugführer (platoon leader) in the 4./Grenadier-Regiment 1124	5 March 1945*	Killed in action 19 February 1945	—
Heinz Brandt	Heer	Leutnant of the Reserves	Company leader in the Panzergrenadier-Regiment 103 (Note: According to Scherzer as a leader in the 7./Panzergrenadier-Regiment 103.)	6 May 1945	—	—
Paul Brandt	Luftwaffe	Oberfeldwebel	Pilot in the IV./Jagdgeschwader 54	5 September 1944	—	—
Walter Brandt	Luftwaffe	Oberfeldwebel	Pilot in the I./Jagdgeschwader 77 (Note: According to Scherzer as a pilot in the 2./Jagdgeschwader 77.)	24 March 1943	—	
Walter Brandt	Heer	Major	Commander of Panzer-Pionier-Bataillon 130	18 July 1944	—	A man wearing a military uniform.
Günther Bransch	Heer	Hauptmann of the Reserves	Commander of Divisions-Aufklärungs-Abteilung 392 (kroatische) (Note: According to Scherzer as commander of Aufklärungs-Abteilung 392 (kroatische).)	9 December 1944	—	—
Paul Brasack	Kriegsmarine	Kapitänleutnant	Commander of U-737	30 October 1944	—	
Rudi Brasche	Heer	Obergefreiter	Group leader in the 4./Panzergrenadier-Regiment 93	9 November 1942	—	—
Karl Brassert	Heer	Oberst	Kampfkommandant (combat commander) Marienburg (Note: According to Scherzer as commander Festung (fortress) Marienburg.)	10 February 1945	—	—
Walther von Brauchitsch	Heer	Generaloberst	Oberbefehlshaber des Heeres (Commander-in-Chief of the Army)	30 September 1939	—	A man wearing a military uniform.
Walter Brauer	Heer	Oberleutnant of the Reserves	Chief of the 14.(Panzerjäger)/Grenadier-Regiment 507 (Note: According to Scherzer as chief of the 14./Grenadier-Regiment 507.)	10 September 1944	—	—
Alfred Braun	Heer	Oberfeldwebel	Zugführer (platoon leader) in the 3./Grenadier-Regiment 544	12 August 1944*	Killed in action 15 July 1944	—
Christian Braun+	Heer	Oberfeldwebel	Zugführer (platoon leader) in the 8.(MG)/Grenadier-Regiment 308 (Note: According to Scherzer as leader of the II. Zug/ 8./Grenadier-Regiment 308.)	15 July 1944	Awarded 677th Oak Leaves 9 December 1944	—
Rudolf Braun	Luftwaffe	Leutnant	Staffelführer of the 1./Sturzkampfgeschwader 3	14 June 1941	—	—
Wilhelm Braun	Heer	Major	Commander of the II./Infanterie-Regiment 576	20 January 1943	—	—
Willi Braun	Luftwaffe	Fahnenjunker-Feldwebel	Observer in the 4./Kampfgeschwader 55	9 June 1944	—	—
Hans-Günther Braun von Stumm	Heer	Rittmeister	Leader of Divisions-Aufklärungs-Abteilung 100 (Note: According to Scherzer as leader of Aufklärungs-Abteilung 100.)	20 July 1942*	Died in accident 15 September 1941	—
[Dr.] Herward Braunegg	Luftwaffe	Oberleutnant	Pilot and observer in the Nahaufklärungs-Gruppe 9 (Note: According to Scherzer on 26 March 1944 as a pilot and an observer in the Stab/Nahaufklärungs-Gruppe 9.)	28 March 1944	—	—
Erich Brauneis	Kriegsmarine	Fregattenkapitän	Chief of the 24. Landungsflottille	28 December 1944	—	—
Eugen Brecht	Heer	Major im Generalstab (in the General Staff)	Ib (quartermaster general) of the 131. Infanterie-Division	3 October 1943	—	—
Wilhelm Bredemeier	Heer	Feldwebel	Zugführer (platoon leader) in the 12.(MG)/Gebirgsjäger-Regiment 91 (Note: According to Scherzer as a Zugführer (platoon leader) in the 12./Gebirgsjäger-Regiment 91.)	9 November 1942	—	—
Franz Bredemeyer	Heer	Feldwebel	Zugführer (platoon leader) in the 2./Infanterie-Regiment 156 (motorized)	23 August 1943	—	—
Hermann Breer	Heer	Unteroffizier	Zugführer (platoon leader) in the 6./Grenadier-Regiment 78	8 August 1944*	Killed in action 19 July 1944	—
Werner Breese	Luftwaffe	Hauptmann	Pilot in the 5.(F)/Aufklärungs-Gruppe 122 (Note: According to Scherzer as a pilot in the Aufklärungsstaffel 5.(F)/122.)	29 February 1944	—	—
Josef Bregenzer+	Heer	Hauptmann	Commander of the I./Grenadier-Regiment 245	20 April 1943	Awarded 427th Oak Leaves 17 March 1944	—
Claus Breger+	Heer	Stabsfeldwebel	Zugführer (platoon leader) in the 1./Infanterie-Regiment 27	4 September 1942	Awarded 700th Oak Leaves 14 January 1945	—
Gerhard Brehme	Heer	Oberfeldwebel	Zugführer (platoon leader) in the 1./Panzer-Abteilung 52	23 August 1943*	Died of wounds 17 July 1943 (Note: According to Scherzer on 27 July 1943.)	—
Gustav Brehmer	Heer	Major of the Reserves	Commander of Pionier-Bataillon 271	9 December 1944	—	—
Rudolf Brehmer	Heer	Oberstleutnant	Commander of Infanterie-Regiment 347	22 February 1942	—	—
Friedrich-Wilhelm Breidenbach	Heer	Major	Leader of the Panzer-Brigade 101	30 September 1944	—	—
Hermann Breith+	Heer	Oberst	Commander of the 5. Panzer-Brigade	3 June 1940	Awarded 69th Oak Leaves 31 January 1942; 48th Swords 21 February 1944	The head and shoulders of a man. He wears a peaked cap and military uniform, and an Iron Cross displayed at the front of his uniform collar. His facial expression is a determined; his eyes are looking into the camera.
Fritz Breithaupt+	Kriegsmarine	Korvettenkapitän of the Reserves	Chief of the 12. Minensuchflottille	3 August 1941	Awarded 387th Oak Leaves 10 February 1944	—
Gerhard Bremer+	Waffen-SS	SS-Obersturmführer	Leader of the 1.(Kradschützen)/Aufklärungs-Abteilung "Leibstandarte SS Adolf Hitler"	30 October 1941	Awarded 668th Oak Leaves 26 November 1944	—
Oskar Bremermann? (Note: Oskar Bremermann's nomination by his unit was received on 19 April 1945. The Heerespersonalamt (HPA—Army Staff Office) did not create an internal nomination request. The existing file card in the German Archives is not contemporary! This card states: "nominated on 20 April 1945, forwarded by Major Joachim Domaschk on 28 April yes". The book "Verliehene Ritterkreuze" (Awarded Knight Crosses) states approval by Domaschk "Knight's Cross yes". No further evidence of the presentation can be found. According to the Association of Knight's Cross Recipients (AKCR) the award was presented in accordance with the Dönitz-decree. This is illegal according to the Deutsche Dienststelle (WASt) and lacks legal justification. The presentation date was assigned by Walther-Peer Fellgiebel. Bremermann was a member of the AKCR.)	Heer	Feldwebel	Zugführer (platoon leader) in the 6./Grenadier-Regiment 209	9 May 1945	—	—
Josef Bremm+	Heer	Leutnant of the Reserves	Chief of the 5./Infanterie-Regiment 426	18 February 1942	Awarded 165th Oak Leaves 23 December 1943 (159th) Swords 9 May 1945? (Note: Josef Bremm's nomination by his unit was rejected by Major Joachim Domaschk on 30 April 1945 and instead recommended for the German Cross in Gold. Just like all other nominations, which at this point in time were related to members of the 11. Armee, the nomination was not further processed since the 11. Armee had capitulated on 21 April 1945 and presentations to prisoners of war or missing in action were prohibited. In all other instances of similar circumstances a note on the nomination can be found stating: "postpone AOK 11" or "postpone according to AHA 44 Ziff. 572 (Allgemeines Heeresamt — General Army Office)". The entry date noted on the nomination list for the higher grades of the Knight's Cross of the Iron Cross is 28 April 1945. The list indicates a note "deferred". The Association of Knight's Cross Recipients (AKCR) claims that the award was presented in accordance with the Dönitz-decree. This is illegal according to the Deutsche Dienststelle (WASt) and lacks legal justification. The sequential number "159" was assigned by the AKCR. The presentation date was assigned by Fellgiebel. Bremm was a member of the AKCR.)	
Albert Brendel	Heer	Oberst	Commander of Infanterie-Regiment 274	20 January 1943	—	—
Hans Brendel	Heer	Oberst	Commander of Infanterie-Regiment 689	7 December 1942	—	—
Joachim Brendel+	Luftwaffe	Oberleutnant	Staffelkapitän of the 1./Jagdgeschwader 51 "Mölders"	22 November 1943	Awarded 697th Oak Leaves 14 January 1945	—
Peter Brenig	Heer	Unteroffizier	Group leader in the Regiments-Pionier-Zug/Grenadier-Regiment 669	15 June 1944*	Killed in action 23 March 1944	—
Kurt Brennecke	Heer	General der Infanterie	Commanding general of the XXXXIII. Armeekorps	12 July 1942	—	—
Wilhelm Brennecke	Luftwaffe	Oberfeldwebel	Pilot in the Stab II./Kampfgeschwader 55	26 March 1944	—	—
Gerhard Brenner	Luftwaffe	Leutnant of the Reserves	Pilot in the 2.(K)/Lehrgeschwader 1	5 July 1941	—	—
Dr. Dr. Harro Brenner	Heer	Leutnant of the Reserves	Leader of the Infanterie-Kompanie "De Kaste" (Note: According to Scherzer as leader of the infantry company in the Kampfstaffel [Kasta] of the Heeresgruppe Afrika.)	16 April 1943	—	—
Karl-Heinrich Brenner	Waffen-SS	SS-Gruppenführer and Generalleutnant of the Waffen-SS (Note: According to Scherzer as SS-Gruppenführer and Generalleutnant of the Police.)	Commander of 6. SS-Gebirgs-Division "Nord"	27 December 1944	—	
Gerhard Brentführer	Heer	Oberleutnant (Note: According to Scherzer as Oberleutnant of the Reserves and chief of the 4./Grenadier-Regiment 9.)	Chief of the 4.(MG)/Grenadier-Regiment 9	4 October 1944	—	—
Heinz Bretnütz	Luftwaffe	Hauptmann	Gruppenkommandeur of the II./Jagdgeschwader 53	21 October 1940 (Note: According to Scherzer on 22 October 1940.)	—	
Heinz Bretschneider	Luftwaffe	Oberwachtmeister	Battery officer in the I./Flak-Regiment 13 (motorized) (Note: According to Scherzer as a battery officer in the 1./Flak-Regiment (motorized) 13.)	3 February 1943	—	—
Klaus Bretschneider	Luftwaffe	Leutnant	Pilot in the 5./Jagdgeschwader 300 (Note: According to Scherzer as a pilot in the 5.(Sturm)/Jagdgeschwader 300.)	18 November 1944	—	—
Konrad Brettschneider	Heer	Oberleutnant	Leader of the 1./Sturmgeschütz-Brigade 904	1 February 1945	—	—
Hans Bretz? (Note: No evidence of the award can be found in the German Federal Archives. According to Walther-Peer Fellgiebel the presentation was made by Feldmarschall Ferdinand Schörner in accordance with the enabling act of 3 May 1945, which is incorrect, because Schörner wrote to Hans Bretz on 27 June 1955 that "in the last days of the month April 1945 the Knight's Cross of the Iron Cross was presented." Scherzer argues that this seems to have been a favour to Bretz because there was no communication link into the Führerhauptquartier at the end of April. The Order Commission of the Association of Knight's Cross Recipients (AKCR) processed this case in 1982. What evidence was analyzed and processed is unknown to Scherzer. Scherzer speculates that this was based on Schörner's favour to Bretz and the AKCR decided: Knight's Cross "yes on 27 April 1945". Apparently the AKCR later were unconvinced and changed the date to 6 May 1945. Scherzer posed the question if this was done in order to declare the bestowal as a Schörner presentation. Scherzer was denied access to files, which could help clarify the case, of the AKCR on the grounds of the Bundesarchivgesetz (German Archive Law). Bretz had been a member of AKCR but left the AKCR.)	Heer	Oberfähnrich	Zugführer (platoon leader) in the Panzer-Vernichtungs-Brigade Oberschlesien	6 May 1945	—	—
Peter-Paul Breu	Luftwaffe	Hauptmann	Gruppenkommandeur of the II./Kampfgeschwader 3 "Lützow"	2 October 1942	—	—
Helmuth Breuker	Heer	Hauptmann	Commander of the I./Gebirgsjäger-Regiment 141	26 November 1944	—	—
Hans Briegel	Luftwaffe	Major (Note: According to Scherzer as Major of the Reserves.)	Leader of Fallschirm-Panzergrenadier-Regiment 2 "Hermann Göring"	14 January 1945	—	—
Georg Briel	Heer	Major	Commander of Heeres-Flak-Bataillon 606 (Note: According to Scherzer as commander of Flak-Bataillon 606.)	23 July 1942	—	—
Kurt von Briesen	Heer	Generalleutnant	Commander of the 30. Infanterie-Division	27 October 1939	—	
Dr.-Ing. Karl-Friedrich Brill+	Kriegsmarine	Korvettenkapitän of the Reserves	Commander of Minenschiff Cobra and leader of a mine laying group (Note: According to Scherzer as commander of Minenschiff Cobra.)	27 December 1941	Awarded 330th Oak Leaves 18 November 1943	—
Kurt Brill	Heer	Major	Deputy leader of Grenadier-Regiment 956	4 July 1944	—	—
Friedrich Brinckmann	Luftwaffe	Oberleutnant	Pilot in the 6.(F)/Aufklärungs-Gruppe 122 (Note: According to Scherzer on 31 December 1943 and pilot in the Aufklärungsstaffel 6.(F)/122/Fernaufklärungs-Gruppe 1.)	30 December 1943	—	—
Hubert Brinkforth	Heer	Gefreiter	Richtschütze (gunner) in the 14.(Panzerjäger)/Infanterie-Regiment 25 (Note: According to Scherzer as a Richtschütze (gunner) in the 14./Infanterie-Regiment 25.)	7 March 1941	—	—
Helmuth Brinkmann	Kriegsmarine	Vizeadmiral	Kommadierender Admiral Schwarzes Meer (commanding admiral of the Black Sea)	17 May 1944	—	—
Karl Britzelmayr	Heer	Oberstleutnant	Commander of Infanterie-Regiment 217	2 February 1942	—	—
Achim von Britzke	Heer	Hauptmann (Note: According to Scherzer as Hauptmann of the Reserves and chief of Panzerjäger-Kompanie 1299.)	Chief of Panzerjäger-Sturmgeschütz-Kompanie 1299	23 October 1944	—	—
Hugo Broch	Luftwaffe	Feldwebel	Pilot in the 8./Jagdgeschwader 54	12 March 1945	—	—
Cay-Lorenz Baron von Brockdorff	Heer	Oberleutnant	Regiment adjutant of Panzer-Regiment 15 (Note: According to Scherzer as adjutant of Panzer-Regiment 15.)	14 April 1945	—	—
Ernst-Albrecht Graf von Brockdorff-Ahlefeldt	Heer	Rittmeister	Commander of Kradschützen-Bataillon 22	26 December 1942	—	—
Walter Graf von Brockdorff-Ahlefeldt+	Heer	General der Infanterie	Commanding general of the II. Armeekorps	15 July 1941	Awarded 103rd Oak Leaves 27 June 1942	—
Jürgen Brocke	Luftwaffe	Leutnant	Pilot in the 4./Jagdgeschwader 77	9 December 1942*	Killed in action 15 September 1942	A man sitting in folding chair wearing a military uniform, a peaked cap is resting on his knees.
Dr. Karl Brocks	Heer	Hauptmann of the Reserves	Regiment adjutant of Grenadier-Regiment 123 (Note: According to Scherzer as adjutant of Grenadier-Regiment 123.)	30 September 1944	—	—
Roland Brod	Heer	Hauptmann	Commander of the III./Grenadier-Regiment 467	23 February 1944*	Died of wounds 5 January 1944	—
Heinrich Brodowski	Heer	Obergefreiter	Machine gunner in the 8.(MG)/Grenadier-Regiment 386 (Note: According to Scherzer as a machine gunner in the 8./Grenadier-Regiment 386.)	18 December 1944	—	—
Wilhelm Bröckerhoff? (Note: No evidence of the award can be found in the German Federal Archives. According to Wilhelm Bröckerhoff's own account the presentation was noted in his pay book. The files of the Order Commission of the Association of Knight's Cross Recipients (AKCR) indicate that the former divisional commander, General Hermann Schulte-Heuthaus, in 1961 remembered that he had nominated Bröckerhoff for the Knight's Cross sometime between the middle and end of March 1945. Also noted in the files of the AKCR is that Bröckerhoff's pay book was missing when Von Seemen had asked for Bröckerhoff for a copy. An additional intermittent commander, the former Commander-in-Chief of the Panzer-Korps "Großdeutschland" General Georg Jauer, stated in 1961 "that he cannot remember this case" and "that he doesn't know when the Knight's Cross was approved and when the presentation was made." Jauer also stated that "he has no doubt that after the nomination was made and submitted—as stated by Schulte-Heuthaus—that Major Bröckerhoff would have received the Knight's Cross." The nomination was definitely not received by the Heerespersonalamt (HPA—Army Staff Office)—as stated by Von Seemen—nor rejected by the HPA. Karl Dönitz, who received Jauer's letter, accepted Jauer's assumption. Dönitz wrote to Bröckerhoff: "Everything is alright!" and testified on 18 April 1961 to have awarded Bröckerhoff "the Knight’s Cross on 8 May 1945". Bröckerhoff was a member of the AKCR.)	Heer	Major	Leader of Panzer-Artillerie-Regiment "Brandenburg"	8 May 1945	—	—
Wilhelm Broeffel	Heer	Hauptmann	Commander of the II./Grenadier-Regiment 502	14 November 1943	—	—
Jost Brökelmann	Kriegsmarine	Korvettenkapitän	Chief of the 2. Räumbootflottille	14 June 1942	—	—
Herbert Broennle	Luftwaffe	Oberfeldwebel	Pilot in the 4./Jagdgeschwader 54 (Note: According to Scherzer as a pilot in the 2./Jagdgeschwader 54.)	14 March 1943	—	—
Karl Brösamle	Heer	Unteroffizier	Rifle leader in the 4.(MG)/Grenadier-Regiment 330 (Note: According to Scherzer as a rifle leader in the 4./Grenadier-Regiment 330.)	26 June 1944	—	—
Eduard Brogsitter	Luftwaffe	Oberleutnant	Staffelführer in the II./Kampfgeschwader 76	24 March 1943	—	—
Friedrich Freiherr von Broich	Heer	Oberst	Commander of the 24. Panzergrenadier-Brigade	29 August 1942	—	—
Peter Broich	Luftwaffe	Oberfeldwebel	Pilot in the 2./Kampfgeschwader 2	24 September 1942	—	—
Wilhelm Bromen	Luftwaffe	Leutnant of the Reserves (Note: According to Scherzer as Leutnant (war officer) and pilot in the I./Sturzkampfgeschwader 2 "Immelmann".)	Pilot and z.b.V. Offizier (officer for special deployment) in the 4./Sturzkampfgeschwader 2 "Immelmann"	16 April 1943	—	—
Karl Brommann	Waffen-SS	SS-Untersturmführer	Leader of the 1./schwere SS-Panzer-Abteilung 503	29 April 1945	—	—
Heinrich-Walter Bronsart von Schellendorff+	Heer	Oberst	Commander of Panzergrenadier-Regiment 13	10 September 1943	Awarded 394th Oak Leaves 12 February 1944	—
Siegfried Brosow	Waffen-SS	SS-Hauptsturmführer	Chief of the 1./SS-Panzer-Pionier-Bataillon "Das Reich" (Note: According to Scherzer as chief of the 1./SS-Panzer-Pionier-Bataillon 2.)	13 November 1943	—	—
Paul Brucher	Heer	Leutnant	Zugführer (platoon leader) in the 3./Infanterie-Regiment 447	23 October 1941	—	—
Gerhard Bruchmann	Heer	Unteroffizier	Group leader in the 3./Grenadier-Regiment 12	6 August 1943	—	—
Helmut Bruck+	Luftwaffe	Hauptmann	Staffelkapitän of the 1./Sturzkampfgeschwader 77 (Note: According to Scherzer as Gruppenkommandeur of the I./Sturzkampfgeschwader 77.)	4 September 1941	Awarded 193rd Oak Leaves 19 February 1943	—
Victor Bruck	Heer	Hauptmann of the Reserves	Commander of the I./Grenadier-Regiment 376	20 October 1944	—	—
Johann Brucker	Heer	Oberstleutnant	Commander of Grenadier-Regiment 959	5 April 1945	—	—
Walter Brucker	Heer	Hauptmann	Leader of the III./Jäger-Regiment 56	16 April 1943	—	—
Heinrich Brücker	Luftwaffe	Hauptmann	Gruppenkommandeur of the III./Sturzkampfgeschwader 2 "Immelmann"	22 June 1941 (Note: According to Scherzer on 24 June 1941.)	—	—
Otto-Hermann Brücker	Heer	Generalmajor	Commander of the 6. Volks-Grenadier-Division	14 April 1945	—	—
Erich von Brückner	Heer	Oberst	Commander of Jäger-Regiment 1 "Brandenburg"	11 March 1945	—	—
Wilhelm Brückner	Heer	Unteroffizier	Geschützführer (gun layer) in the 14.(Panzerjäger)/Infanterie-Regiment 253 (Note: According to Scherzer as a Geschützführer (gun layer) in the 14./Infanterie-Regiment 253.)	5 October 1941	—	—
Wolfgang Brückner	Luftwaffe	Oberleutnant	Staffelkapitän of the 3./Kampfgeschwader 1 "Hindenburg"	5 December 1943*	Killed in action 14 July 1943	—
Heinrich Brüggemann	Heer	Feldwebel	Kompanietruppführer (company headquarters leader) in the 3./Grenadier-Regiment 178	5 April 1945	—	—
Karl Brüggemann	Heer	Unteroffizier	Group leader in the Stabskompanie/Infanterie-Regiment 5	28 November 1940	—	—
Friedrich-August Graf von Brühl	Heer	Hauptmann of the Reserves	Chief of the 8./Panzer-Regiment 2	3 November 1942	—	—
Walter Brüning	Heer	Leutnant (Note: According to Scherzer as Leutnant of the Reserves and adjutant and leader of the III./Infanterie-Regiment 508.)	Company chief in the III./Infanterie-Regiment 508	12 January 1942	—	—
Alfred Bruer	Heer	Oberst	Commander of Panzer-Artillerie-Regiment 155	30 July 1942	—	—
Josef Bruetsch	Heer	Unteroffizier	Group leader in the 1./Divisions-Füsilier-Bataillon 305	17 March 1945	—	—
Hans Bruhn	Heer	Oberleutnant	Chief of the 3./Grenadier-Regiment 90	29 December 1942	—	—
Johannes Bruhn	Heer	Oberst	Artilleriekommandeur 149	20 December 1943	—	—
Derk-Elsko Bruins	Waffen-SS	SS-Rottenführer	Geschützführer (gun layer) in the 1./SS-Panzer-Jäger-Abteilung 54 "Nederland" (Note: According to Scherzer as a Geschützführer (gun layer) in the 1./SS-Panzer-Jäger-Abteilung 54.)	23 August 1944	—	—
Edgar Brunk	Heer	Oberleutnant	Chief of the 2./Füsilier-Regiment 202	3 July 1944	—	—
Albert Brunner	Luftwaffe	Oberfeldwebel	Pilot in the 6./Jagdgeschwader 5	3 July 1943*	Killed in action 7 May 1943	
Eduard Brunner+	Heer	Hauptmann	Leader of the I./Grenadier-Regiment 62	27 February 1944	Awarded 638th Oak Leaves 28 October 1944 (Note: According to Scherzer on 18 October 1944.)	—
Arthur Bruns	Heer	Major	Leader of Grenadier-Regiment 245	3 April 1943*	Killed in action 4 February 1943	—
Dr.-jur. Axel Bruns	Heer	Oberleutnant of the Reserves	Leader of the 7./Artillerie-Regiment 241	29 August 1943	—	—
Diedrich Bruns	Heer	Major of the Reserves	Commander of the II./Infanterie-Regiment 16	9 August 1942	—	—
Gustav-Adolf Bruns	Heer	Oberstleutnant	Commander of Panzergrenadier-Regiment 74	15 October 1942	—	—
Karl-Heinz Brunsiek	Heer	Leutnant (Note: According to Scherzer as Leutnant of the Reserves.)	Leader of the 4./Grenadier-Regiment 43	5 April 1945	—	—
Fritz Brutscher	Heer	Leutnant of the Reserves	Leader of the 3./Panzer-Pionier-Bataillon 92	22 January 1943	—	—
Albert Brux+	Heer	Hauptmann	Commander of the I./Schützen-Regiment 66	12 September 1941	Awarded 504th Oak Leaves 24 June 1944	—
Fritz Buchenau	Heer	Major	Commander of Fahnenjunker-Regiment 4 of the Artillerie-Schule II Groß-Born (Note: According to Scherzer as commander of Fahnenjunker-Regiment 4 (Division "Märkisch-Friedland").)	28 March 1945	—	—
Hans Buchholz	Luftwaffe	Oberleutnant of the Reserves	Pilot in the 1./Kampfgeschwader 40	24 March 1941	—	—
Helmut-Wolfgang Buchler	Heer	Hauptmann	Commander of the I./Infanterie-Regiment 204	6 January 1942*	Killed in action 10 December 1941	—
Franz Buchner	Heer	Oberleutnant	Chief of the 5./Infanterie-Regiment 30 (motorized)	2 October 1941	—	—
Hermann Buchner	Waffen-SS	SS-Hauptsturmführer	Commander of the III./SS-Panzergrenadier-Regiment 5 "Totenkopf" (Note: According to Scherzer as commander of the III./SS-Panzergrenadier-Regiment 5 "Thule".)	16 June 1944	—	—
Hermann Buchner	Luftwaffe	Oberfeldwebel	Pilot in the 6./Schlachtgeschwader 2 "Immelmann" (Note: According to Scherzer as a pilot in the II./Schlachtgeschwader 2 "Immelmann".)	20 July 1944	—	—
Max Bucholz (Note: According to Scherzer his name is spelled Max Buchholz who received the Knight's Cross of the Iron Cross as a pilot in the Stab I./Jagdgeschwader 3.)	Luftwaffe	Oberleutnant	Staffelkapitän in the I./Jagdgeschwader 3	12 August 1941	—	
Ernst-Georg Buchterkirch+	Heer	Oberleutnant	Zugführer (platoon leader) in the 2./Panzer-Regiment 6	29 June 1940	Awarded 44th Oak Leaves 31 December 1941	
Albert Buck	Heer	Oberst	Commander of Infanterie-Regiment 305	17 July 1941	—	—
Friedrich Buck	Waffen-SS	SS-Oberscharführer	Leader of the 5./SS-Kavallerie-Regiment 15 "Florian Geyer" (Note: According to Scherzer as leader of the 5./SS-Kavallerie-Regiment 15.)	27 January 1945	—	—
Wilhelm Buck	Heer	Oberstleutnant	Commander of Panzergrenadier-Regiment 2	31 July 1943	—	—
Karl Buckel	Heer	Oberleutnant of the Reserves	Chief of the 3./Sturmgeschütz-Brigade 277	15 July 1944	—	—
Kurt Budäus	Heer	Oberleutnant (Note: According to Scherzer as Oberleutnant of the Reserves.)	Machine gun Zugführer (platoon leader) in the I./Infanterie-Regiment 307	21 December 1940	—	—
Georg Budahl	Heer	Leutnant	Zugführer (platoon leader) in the 1./Panzer-Jäger-Abteilung 121	21 September 1944	—	—
Franz Budka	Waffen-SS	SS-Untersturmführer	Leader of the 1./SS-Festungs-Regiment 1 "Besslein" (Note: According to Scherzer as leader of the 1./SS-Festungs-Regiment "Besslein"/Festung Breslau (fortress Breslau).)	19 April 1945	—	—
Bruno Büchau	Heer	Hauptmann of the Reserves	Leader of the II./Grenadier-Regiment 159	19 August 1944	—	—
Hermann Büchting	Kriegsmarine	Kapitänleutnant	Commander of Schnellboot S-27 in the 1. Schnellbootflottille (Note: According to Scherzer as commander of Schnellboot S-27 respectively S-51 in the 1. Schnellbootflottille.)	22 April 1943	—	—
Hermann Bühlbecker	Heer	Hauptmann	Commander of the II./Grenadier-Regiment 436	23 August 1944	—	—
Karl-Heinz Bühler? (Note: No evidence of the award to Karl-Heinz Bühler can be found in the German Federal Archives. The award was presumably awarded by SS-Oberstgruppenführer Sepp Dietrich, which would make it an unlawful presentation. The Order Commission of the Association of Knight's Cross Recipients (AKCR) processed this case in 1977 and decided: Knight's Cross no, 1 May 1945. The case Bühler was again processed in the fall of 1983. Whether or not additional or new evidence materialized remains unknown. The Order Commission decided this time: Knight's Cross yes, 8 May 1945. Von Seemen lists him on 7 May 1945, Krätschmer states 1 May 1945. Fellgiebel later re-dated the award on 6 May 1945. It remains subject to speculation why this was done. Bühler was a member of the AKCR.)	Waffen-SS	SS-Obersturmbannführer	Commander of SS-Panzergrenadier-Regiment 9 "Germania"	6 May 1945	—	—
Kurt Bühligen+	Luftwaffe	Oberfeldwebel	Pilot in the II./Jagdgeschwader 2 "Richthofen" (Note: According to Scherzer in the 4./Jagdgeschwader 2 "Richthofen".)	4 September 1941	Awarded 413th Oak Leaves 2 March 1944; 88th Swords 14 August 1944	
Karl-August Freiherr von Bülow	Heer	Oberst	Commander of Panzer-Regiment 24	12 December 1944	—	—
Otto von Bülow+	Kriegsmarine	Kapitänleutnant	Commander of U-404	20 October 1942	Awarded 234th Oak Leaves 26 April 1943	—
Harry von Bülow-Bothkamp	Luftwaffe	Oberstleutnant of the Reserves	Geschwaderkommodore of Jagdgeschwader 2 "Richthofen"	22 August 1940	—	
Alfred Bülowius	Luftwaffe	Oberst	Geschwaderkommodore of (K)Lehrgeschwader 1 (Note: According to Scherzer as Geschwaderkommodore of Lehrgeschwader 1.)	4 July 1940	—	
Rudolf von Bünau+	Heer	Oberst	Commander of Infanterie-Regiment 133	15 August 1940	Awarded 766th Oak Leaves 5 March 1945	—
Rudolf von Bünau	Heer	Hauptmann	Commander of Panzer-Aufklärungs-Abteilung 9	8 August 1943	—	—
Hans Büntemeyer	Heer	Hauptmann of the Reserves	Commander in the II./Grenadier-Regiment 399	18 February 1945	—	—
Wilhelm Bürgel	Heer	Oberwachtmeister	Battery officer in the 5./Gebirgs-Artillerie-Regiment 8	29 February 1944	—	—
Albert Bürger	Luftwaffe	Oberleutnant (Note: According to Scherzer as Oberleutnant of the Reserves.)	In the Stab 4. Flak-Division	17 April 1945	—	—
Otto Bürger	Heer	Oberleutnant	Chief of the 1./Panzergrenadier-Regiment 3	14 April 1945	—	—
Thomas Bürger	Heer	Hauptmann (Note: According to Scherzer as Oberleutnant and leader of the III./Infanterie-Regiment 528.)	Commander of the III./Infanterie-Regiment 528	4 March 1942	—	—
Wilhelm Bürgerhoff	Heer	Oberfeldwebel	Zugführer (platoon leader) in the 7./Grenadier-Regiment 166	5 May 1943	—	—
Ulrich Bürker	Heer	Oberstleutnant im Generalstab (in the General Staff)	Ia (operations officer) of the 10. Panzer-Division	19 January 1943	—	—
Dr. Nikolaus Büsen	Luftwaffe	Hauptmann	Staffelführer of the 1./Fernaufklärungs-Gruppe 122 (Note: According to Scherzer as Staffelführer of the Aufklärungsstaffel 1.(F)/122.)	4 September 1942*	Died of wounds 14 June 1942	—
Otto Büsing	Heer	Oberstleutnant	Commander of Panzer-Regiment 39	21 November 1942	—	—
Wilhelm Büsing	Heer	Hauptmann of the Reserves	Leader of the I./Grenadier-Regiment 280	28 February 1945	Died 16 April 1945	—
Arthur Büssecke	Luftwaffe	Unteroffizier	Geschützführer (gun layer) in the 2./Flak-Regiment 49 (motorized)	23 December 1942	—	—
Hans Bütow	Kriegsmarine	Kapitän zur See	Führer der Torpedoboote (leader of torpedo boats)	12 March 1941	—	—
Franz Büttner	Heer	Obergefreiter	Group leader in the 7./Grenadier-Regiment 67	18 December 1944	—	—
Manfred Büttner? (Note: No evidence of the award can be found in the German Federal Archives. Gerhard von Seemen in his second edition of the Die Ritterkreuzträger 1939–1945 from 1976 quotes that Manfred Büttner is listed by Böhmler Fallschirmjäger, 1. Auflage. Walther-Peer Fellgiebel states about Büttner in his book: "Knight's Cross of the Iron Cross recipients exist, who do not have official evidence in the Federal Archives, but are members of the Bundeswehr and claimed to be Knight's Cross recipients. This claim in some cases was investigated by the Militärischer Abschirmdienst (MAD—Military Counterintelligence Service ) and accepted." Büttner was a member of the Association of Knight's Cross Recipients (AKCR).)	Luftwaffe	Fahnenjunker-Feldwebel	Leader of the 2./Fallschirmjäger-Regiment 26	29 April 1945	—	A man wearing a camouflage military uniform and steel helmet.
Ernst Buffa	Luftwaffe	Generalleutnant	Commander of the 12. Flak-Division (motorized)	5 September 1944	—	
Martin Buhr	Heer	Major	Commander of Sturmgeschütz-Abteilung 202	11 September 1943	—	—
Rudolf de Buhr	Heer	Unteroffizier	Group leader in the 5./Infanterie-Regiment 76 (motorized)	2 October 1943	—	—
Rudolf Buhse	Heer	Oberstleutnant	Commander of Infanterie-Regiment 47	17 August 1942	—	—
Hans Bujak	Heer	Feldwebel	Zugführer (platoon leader) in the 10./Grenadier-Regiment 7	27 August 1944	—	—
Otto Bukatschek	Heer	Unteroffizier	Group leader in the 10./Schützen-Regiment 52	24 July 1941	—	—
Ludwig Bulla	Luftwaffe	Oberstleutnant	Commander of Flak-Regiment 164 (motorized)	11 June 1944	—	—
Herbert Bullinger	Heer	Rittmeister	Commander of the II./Kavallerie-Regiment 5 "Feldmarschall von Mackensen"	1 February 1945	—	—
Karl Bulmahn	Heer	Hauptmann	Commander of the II./Grenadier-Regiment 1126	31 January 1945	—	—
Robert Bumen	Luftwaffe	Feldwebel	Pilot in the 1./Sturzkampfgeschwader 77 (Note: According to Scherzer as a pilot in the Stab I./Sturzkampfgeschwader 77.)	29 October 1944	—	—
Walter Bund	Heer	Unteroffizier	Group leader in the 1./Grenadier-Regiment 669	20 October 1944	—	—
Heinz Bundesmann	Heer	Leutnant (Note: According to Scherzer as Leutnant of the Reserves.)	Leader of the 3./Grenadier-Regiment 88	14 January 1945	—	—
Kurt Bundrock	Luftwaffe	Oberfeldwebel	Radio/wireless operator in the Stab/Nachtjagdgeschwader 1 (Note: According to Scherzer on 24 June 1944 in the Stab/Nachtjagdgeschwader 1 [for his achievements as a radio/wireless operator with Geschwaderkommodore Major Werner Streib].)	30 June 1944	—	—
Ernst Bunge	Heer	Hauptmann of the Reserves	Commander of the II./Grenadier-Regiment 121 (Note: According to Scherzer as leader of the II./Grenadier-Regiment 121.)	16 November 1943	—	—
Hellmut Bunge	Heer	Hauptmann	Leader of the II./Panzergrenadier-Regiment "Feldherrnhalle"	1 February 1945	—	—
Fritz Bunse	Waffen-SS	SS-Sturmbannführer	Commander of SS-Freiwilligen-Pionier-Bataillon 11 "Nordland" (Note: According to Scherzer as commander of SS-Pionier-Bataillon 11.)	30 January 1944	—	—
Johannes Bunzek	Luftwaffe	Leutnant	Pilot in the 7./Jagdgeschwader 52	6 April 1944*	Killed in action 11 December 1943	—
Hans Bunzel	Heer	Oberfeldwebel	Zugführer (platoon leader) in the 3./Panzer-Abteilung 116	10 February 1943	—	—
Willi Bunzel	Heer	Major	Commander of the III./Infanterie-Regiment 426	11 October 1941	—	—
Hans Burbach	Heer	Unteroffizier	Geschützführer (gun layer) in the 2./Panzer-Jäger-Abteilung 41	18 November 1943	—	—
Dipl.-Ing. Heinrich Burchard! (Note: Walther-Peer Fellgiebel has struck Heinrich Burchard from the list of Knight's Cross recipients. He noted that Burchard never received the Knight's Cross but the German Cross in Gold on 15 March 1943 instead.)	Luftwaffe	Generalleutnant	Commander of the 7. Flak-Division	31 October 1944	—	—
Theodor Burchardi+	Kriegsmarine	Vizeadmiral	Commanding Admiral Ostland	29 September 1944	Awarded 823rd Oak Leaves 8 April 1945	A man wearing a military uniform and peaked cap with a military order in shape of a cross displayed at the front of his uniform collar.
Lutz-Wilhelm Burckhardt (Note: According to Scherzer his name is Ludwig-Wilhelm Burkhardt who received the Knight's Cross of the Iron Cross as a pilot in the 6./Jagdgeschwader 77.)	Luftwaffe	Leutnant	Pilot in the 4./Jagdgeschwader 77	15 October 1942	—	—
Karl Burdach	Heer	Generalleutnant	Commander of the 11. Infanterie-Division	23 February 1944	—	—
Jörg Burg+	Heer	Leutnant of the Reserves	Zugführer (platoon leader) in the 2./Panzer-Abteilung 18	3 March 1943	Awarded 604th Oak Leaves 4 October 1944	—
Wilhelm Burgdorf	Heer	Oberst	Commander of Infanterie-Regiment 529	29 September 1941	—	—
Alfred Burgemeister? (Note: In 1956 Mr. Steuer, formerly the chief of Heerespersonalamt/P 5 (HPA—Army Staff Office), found a machine written Knight's Cross presentation document dated 2 May 1945 from General der Gebirgstruppe Rudolf Konrad (commanding general of the LXVIII. Armeekorps) on behalf of the Commander-in-Chief of Heeresgruppe Süd, in the personal files at the Federal Ministry of Defence of Alfred Burgemeister. Steuer had sent a copy of this document to the department "III C5" at Federal Ministry of Defence, commenting that: "this documented is to be amended to the personal files of Oberst a.D. Burgemeister in which a presentation of the Knight's Cross is not noted." The presentation, according to this document, which was made on 2 May 1945 and "on behalf of" is therefore illegal. Burgemeister was a member of the Association of Knight's Cross Recipients (AKCR).)	Heer	Oberst	Commander of Grenadier-Regiment 524	2 May 1945	—	—
Georg Burgfeld	Heer	Hauptmann	Chief of the 14.(Panzerjäger)/Divisions-Gruppe 112 (Note: According to Scherzer as chief of the 14./Divisions-Gruppe 112.)	21 February 1944	—	—
Max Burghartswieser	Heer	Oberfeldwebel	Shock troops leader in the 7./Gebirgsjäger-Regiment 100	9 July 1941	—	—
August Burgholte	Heer	Oberfeldwebel	Zugführer (platoon leader) in the 3./Panzer-Abteilung 102	9 December 1944	—	—
Gert Burgmann	Heer	Hauptmann	Chief of the 1./Sturm-Bataillon AOK 4	18 December 1944*	Killed in action 26 October 1944	—
Dr.-jur. Curt von Burgsdorff	Heer	Major of the Reserves	Leader of Grenadier-Regiment 580	2 April 1943	—	—
Ewald Burian	Heer	Oberst	Commander of Grenadier-Regiment 980	4 October 1944	—	
Fritz Burkhardt	Heer	Oberleutnant	Chief of the 8./Grenadier-Regiment 417	17 April 1945	—	—
Arnold Burmeister	Heer	Generalmajor	Leader of the 25. Panzergrenadier-Division	14 January 1945	—	—
Hans-Jürgen Burmester	Heer	Hauptmann	Commander of schwere Panzer-Abteilung 509	2 September 1944	—	—
Leonhard Burr	Luftwaffe	Oberfeldwebel	Radio operator in the 7./Sturzkampfgeschwader 77 (Note: According to Scherzer as a radio operator in the III./Sturzkampfgeschwader 77.)	30 November 1944	—	—
Gustav-Adolf Bursche	Heer	Leutnant	Leader of the 6./Infanterie-Regiment 90	13 October 1941	—	—
Reinhard Burst	Heer	Major	Leader of Grenadier-Regiment 111	12 August 1944	—	—
Ernst Busch+	Heer	General der Infanterie	Commander-in-Chief of the 16. Armee	26 May 1940	Awarded 274th Oak Leaves 21 August 1943	Black-and-white outdoor shot of an older man wearing a military uniform and an Iron Cross decoration suspended from his neck.
Hans Busch	Heer	Major	Commander of the II./Grenadier-Regiment 4	10 September 1944	—	—
Rudolf Busch	Luftwaffe	Oberfeldwebel	Pilot in the 1./Fernaufklärungs-Gruppe 121 (Note: According to Scherzer as a pilot in the Aufklärungsstaffel 1.(F)/121.)	9 June 1944	—	—
Walter Busch	Heer	Leutnant of the Reserves	Leader of the 1./Infanterie-Bataillon z.b.V. 561	14 October 1943	—	—
Walter Busch	Luftwaffe	Hauptmann	Chief of the 1./Flak-Regiment 2 (motorized)	9 June 1944	—	—
Karl Busche	Heer	Oberst (Note: According to Scherzer as Oberstleutnant and leader of a Kampfgruppe in the 101. Jäger-Division and commander of Jäger-Regiment 228.)	Commander of Jäger-Regiment 228	28 February 1943	—	—
Erich Buschenhagen+	Heer	Generalleutnant	Commander of the 15. Infanterie-Division	5 December 1943	Awarded 521st Oak Leaves 4 July 1944	{
Friedrich-Wilhelm Buschhausen	Heer	Major	Commander of the I./Panzergrenadier-Regiment 69	9 May 1943 (Note: According to Scherzer on 10 May 1943.)	—	—
Wilhelm Buss	Heer	Oberfeldwebel	Panzer commander in the 1./Panzer-Regiment 31	9 December 1944	—	—
Axel Freiherr von dem Bussche-Streithorst	Heer	Hauptmann	Commander of the I./Grenadier-Regiment 9	7 March 1944	—	A black-and-white photograph of a smiling man wearing a military uniform and neck order in shape of an Iron Cross.
Heinrich Busse+	Heer	Major	Commander of Divisions-Füsilier-Bataillon 328	26 March 1944	Awarded 637th Oak Leaves 28 October 1944	—
Theodor Busse	Heer	Generalleutnant	Chief of the Generalstab of Heeresgruppe Süd	30 January 1944	—	
Wilhelm Busse	Heer	Major	Leader of Grenadier-Regiment 82	12 March 1944	—	—
Žanis Butkus	Waffen-SS	Waffen-Hauptsturmführer	Leader of the 10./SS-Feld-Ersatz-Bataillon 19 (Note: According to Scherzer as a company leader in the SS-Feld-Ersatz-Bataillon 19.)	21 September 1944	—	—
Pius Butz	Heer	Oberjäger	Geschützführer (gun layer) in the 16.(Infanteriegeschütz)/Jäger-Regiment 228 (Note: According to Scherzer as a Geschützführer (gun layer) in the 16./Jäger-Regiment 228.)	6 March 1944	—	—
Werner Buxa	Heer	Hauptmann	Commander of the I./Grenadier-Regiment 44	23 March 1945	—	—
