= List of Knight's Cross of the Iron Cross with Oak Leaves recipients (1942) =

The Knight's Cross of the Iron Cross (German: Ritterkreuz des Eisernen Kreuzes) and its variants were the highest awards in the military and paramilitary forces of Nazi Germany during World War II. The decoration was awarded for a wide range of reasons and across all ranks, from a senior commander for skilled leadership of his troops in battle to a low-ranking soldier for a single act of extreme gallantry. The Knight's Cross of the Iron Cross with Oak Leaves (Ritterkreuz des Eisernen Kreuzes mit Eichenlaub) was introduced on 3 June 1940 to further distinguish those who had already received the Knight's Cross of the Iron Cross and who continued to show merit in combat bravery or military success. A total of 7 awards were made in 1940; 50 in 1941; 111 in 1942; 192 in 1943; 328 in 1944, and 194 in 1945, giving a total of 882 recipients—excluding the 8 foreign recipients of the award.

The number of 882 Oak Leaves recipients is based on the analysis and acceptance of the order commission of the Association of Knight's Cross Recipients (AKCR). However, author Veit Scherzer has challenged the validity of 27 of these listings. With the exception of Hermann Fegelein, all of the disputed recipients had received the award in 1945, when the deteriorating situation during the final days of World War II in Germany left a number of nominations incomplete and pending in various stages of the approval process. Fegelein received the Oak Leaves in 1942, but was sentenced to death by Adolf Hitler and executed by SS-Gruppenführer Johann Rattenhuber's Reichssicherheitsdienst (RSD) on 28 April 1945 after a court-martial led by SS-Brigadeführer and Generalmajor of the Waffen-SS Wilhelm Mohnke. The sentence was carried out the same day. The death sentence, according to German law, resulted in the loss of all orders and honorary signs.

== Background ==
The Knight's Cross of the Iron Cross and its higher grades were based on four separate enactments. The first enactment, Reichsgesetzblatt I S. 1573 of 1 September 1939 instituted the Iron Cross (Eisernes Kreuz), the Knight's Cross of the Iron Cross and the Grand Cross of the Iron Cross (Großkreuz des Eisernen Kreuzes). Article 2 of the enactment mandated that the award of a higher class be preceded by the award of all preceding classes. As the war progressed, some of the recipients of the Knight's Cross distinguished themselves further and a higher grade, the Oak Leaves to the Knight's Cross of the Iron Cross, was instituted. The Oak Leaves, as they were commonly referred to, were based on the enactment Reichsgesetzblatt I S. 849 of 3 June 1940. In 1941, two higher grades of the Knight's Cross were instituted. The enactment Reichsgesetzblatt I S. 613 of 28 September 1941 introduced the Knight's Cross of the Iron Cross with Oak Leaves and Swords (Ritterkreuz des Eisernen Kreuzes mit Eichenlaub und Schwertern) and the Knight's Cross of the Iron Cross with Oak Leaves, Swords and Diamonds (Ritterkreuz des Eisernen Kreuzes mit Eichenlaub, Schwertern und Brillanten). At the end of 1944 the final grade, the Knight's Cross of the Iron Cross with Golden Oak Leaves, Swords, and Diamonds (Ritterkreuz des Eisernen Kreuzes mit goldenem Eichenlaub, Schwertern und Brillanten), based on the enactment Reichsgesetzblatt 1945 I S. 11 of 29 December 1944, became the final variant of the Knight's Cross authorized.

== Recipients of 1942 ==
Knight's Cross of the Iron Cross with Oak Leaves
Year	Number of presentations	Posthumous presentations
1940	7	0
1941	50	3
1942	111	7
1943	192	17
1944	328	46
1945	194	19

The Oberkommando der Wehrmacht (OKW—Supreme Command of the Armed Forces) kept separate Knight's Cross lists, one for each of the three military branches, Heer (Army), Kriegsmarine (Navy), Luftwaffe (Air force) and for the Waffen-SS. Within each of these lists a unique sequential number was assigned to each recipient. The same numbering paradigm was applied to the higher grades of the Knight's Cross, one list per grade. The sequential numbers greater than 143 for the Knight's Cross of the Iron Cross with Oak Leaves and Swords are unofficial and were assigned by the Association of Knight's Cross Recipients (AKCR) and are therefore denoted in parentheses. The recipients are ordered chronologically and numbered by the official sequential number assigned by the OKW. The rank listed is the recipient's rank at the time the Knight's Cross with Oak Leaves was awarded.

This along with the + (plus) indicates that a higher grade of Knight's Cross was awarded as well.
This along with the * (asterisk) indicates that the Knight's Cross with Oak Leaves was awarded posthumously.
This along with the ? (question mark) indicates that author Veit Scherzer has expressed doubt regarding the veracity or formal correctness of the listing.

Number	Name	Service	Rank	Role and unit (Note: For an explanation of the various naming schemes used by the Luftwaffe, Heer, Kriegsmarine and Waffen-SS refer to nomenclature used by the Wehrmacht and Waffen-SS.)	Date of award	Notes	Image
58	Oskar von Boddien	Heer	Oberstleutnant	Commander of Aufklärungs-Abteilung 22	8 January 1942*	Killed in action 6 January 1942	—
59	Hans Jordan+	Heer	Oberst	Commander of Infanterie-Regiment 49	16 January 1942	Awarded 64th Swords 20 April 1944	—
60	Karl-Wilhelm Specht	Heer	Oberst	Commander of Infanterie-Regiment 55	16 January 1942	—	—
61	Hans Freiherr von Wolff	Heer	Hauptmann	Commander of the I./Schützen-Regiment 28	16 January 1942	At the same time promoted to Major	—
62	Hans-Valentin Hube+	Heer	Generalmajor	Commander of 16. Panzer-Division	16 January 1942	Awarded 22nd Swords 21 December 1942; 13th Diamonds 20 April 1944	
63	Karl-Heinz Noak	Heer	Oberleutnant	Commander of the 1./Panzer-Jagd-Abteilung 137	16 January 1942	—	—
64	Joachim Helbig+	Luftwaffe	Hauptmann	Gruppenkommandeur of the I.(Kampf)/Lehrgeschwader 1	16 January 1942	Awarded 20th Swords 28 September 1942	
65	Otto Hitzfeld+	Heer	Oberstleutnant	Commander of Infanterie-Regiment 213	17 January 1942	Awarded (158th) Swords 9 May 1945? (Note: Otto Hitzfeld's nomination was rejected by Major Joachim Domaschk on 30 April 1945 and commented: "This is not a nomination!" (Only leadership and organisational achievements, no personal bravery) he additionally noted: "missing in cauldron AOK 11". The nomination was thus assessed as insufficient as well as postponed according to AHA 44 Ziff. 572. The entry date noted on the nomination list for the higher grades of the Knight's Cross of the Iron Cross is 28 April 1945. The list indicates a note "deferred". The approval cannot be proven. The order commission of the Association of Knight's Cross Recipients (AKCR) handled the case in 1981 and decided: Swords yes, 9 May 1945. The AKCR claims that the award was presented in accordance with the Dönitz-decree. This is illegal according to the Deutsche Dienststelle (WASt) and lacks legal justification. The sequential number "158" and presentation date was assigned by the AKCR. Hitzfeld was member of the AKCR.)	The head and shoulders of a man. He wears a peaked cap and a military uniform and an Iron Cross displayed at the front of his uniform collar. His facial expression is determined; his eyes are looking into the camera.
66	Wilhelm Wegener+	Heer	Oberst	Commander of Infanterie-Regiment 94	19 January 1942	Awarded 97th Swords 17 September 1944	—
67	Hans Traut	Heer	Oberst	Commander of Infanterie-Regiment 41 (motorized) and leader of 10. Infanterie-Division (motorized)	23 January 1942	—	—
68	Werner-Albrecht von und zu Gilsa	Heer	Generalmajor	Commander of 216. Infanterie-Division	24 January 1942	—	—
69	Hermann Breith+	Heer	Generalmajor	Commander of 3. Panzer-Division	31 January 1942	Awarded 48th Swords 21 February 1944	The head and shoulders of a man. He wears a peaked cap and military uniform, and an Iron Cross displayed at the front of his uniform collar. His facial expression is a determined; his eyes are looking into the camera.
70	Rolf Kaldrack	Luftwaffe	Hauptmann	Gruppenkommandeur of the II./Schnellkampfgeschwader 210	9 February 1942*	Killed in action 3 February 1942	
71	Heinrich Borgmann	Heer	Hauptmann	Commander of the III./Infanterie-Regiment 46	11 February 1942	Killed in action 6 April 1945	—
72	Paul Ludwig Ewald von Kleist+	Heer	Generaloberst	Commander-in-chief of Panzergruppe 1	17 February 1942	Awarded 60th Swords 30 March 1944	The head and shoulders of a man sitting, shown in semi profile. He wears a beaked cap and a military uniform, and an Iron Cross displayed at the front of his uniform collar. His left hand is gloved and he is holding the hilt of a saber in both hands. His facial expression is a determined; his head is pointed to the right of the camera.
73	Georg-Hans Reinhardt+	Heer	General der Panzertruppe	Commander-in-chief of Panzergruppe 3	17 February 1942	Awarded 68th Swords 26 May 1944	The head and torso of a man wearing a military uniform and greatcoat; an Iron Cross is displayed at the front of his uniform collar.
74	Walter Model+	Heer	General der Panzertruppe	Commanding general of the XXXXI. Panzerkorps	17 February 1942	Awarded 28th Swords 2 April 1943; 17th Diamonds 17 August 1944	
75	Willibald Freiherr von Langermann und Erlencamp	Heer	Generalmajor	Commander of 4. Panzer-Division	17 February 1942	—	The head and shoulders of an elderly man, shown in semi-profile. He wears a peaked cap and a military uniform with an Eagle above his right and various military decorations above and on his left breast pocket, and an Iron Cross displayed at the front of his shirt collar. His facial expression is a determined; his eyes are looking into the distance to the left of the camera.
76	Walter Wessel	Heer	Oberst	Commander of Infanterie-Regiment 15 (motorized)	17 February 1942	at the same time promoted to Generalmajor	—
77	Walter Hagen	Luftwaffe	Oberstleutnant	Geschwaderkommodore of Sturzkampfgeschwader 1	17 February 1942	—	
78	Albert Kesselring+	Luftwaffe	Generalfeldmarschall	Chief of Luftflotte 2 and OB Süd	25 February 1942	Awarded 15th Swords 18 July 1942; 14th Diamonds 19 July 1944	Head-and-shoulders portrait of a uniformed Nazi German air force general in his 50s wearing an Iron Cross.
79	Gerhard Köppen	Luftwaffe	Feldwebel	Pilot in the 8./Jagdgeschwader 52	27 February 1942	—	
80	Kurt Ubben	Luftwaffe	Hauptmann	Gruppenkommandeur of the III./Jagdgeschwader 77	12 March 1942	—	
81	Max-Hellmuth Ostermann+	Luftwaffe	Oberleutnant	Staffelkapitän of the 7./Jagdgeschwader 54	12 March 1942	Awarded 10th Swords 17 May 1942	
82	Franz Eckerle	Luftwaffe	Hauptmann	Gruppenkommandeur of the I./Jagdgeschwader 54	12 March 1942*	Killed in action 14 February 1942	
83	Wolf-Dietrich Huy	Luftwaffe	Oberleutnant	Staffelkapitän of the 7./Jagdgeschwader 77	17 March 1942	—	
84	Hans Strelow	Luftwaffe	Leutnant	Staffelführer of the 5./Jagdgeschwader 51 "Mölders"	24 March 1942	—	
85	Wilhelm Spies	Luftwaffe	Hauptmann	Gruppenkommandeur of the I./Zerstörergeschwader 26 "Horst Wessel"	5 April 1942*	Killed in action 27 January 1942	
86	Friedrich-Wilhelm Müller+	Heer	Oberst	Commander of Infanterie-Regiment 105	8 April 1942	Awarded 128th Swords 27 January 1945	—
87	Erich Topp+	Kriegsmarine	Kapitänleutnant	Commander of U-552	11 April 1942	Awarded 17th Swords 17 August 1942	Topp is seen on board, wearing his greatcoat. He is smiling broadly.
88	Theodor Eicke	Waffen-SS	SS-Obergruppenführer and General of the Waffen-SS	Commander of SS-Division "Totenkopf"	20 April 1942	—	A black-and-white photograph of a man in semi profile wearing a military uniform and neck order, in shape of an Iron Cross. His dark hair is combed to the back. He has determined facial expression.
89	Reinhard Hardegen	Kriegsmarine	Kapitänleutnant	Commander of U-123	23 April 1942	—	
90	Wolfgang Späte	Luftwaffe	Oberleutnant of the Reserves	Staffelkapitän of the 5./Jagdgeschwader 54	23 April 1942	—	
91	Alfred Wünnenberg	Waffen-SS	SS-Brigadeführer and Generalmajor of the Police	Commander of SS-Polizei-Division	23 April 1942	—	A black-and-white photograph of a man wearing a military uniform and a neck order in shape of an Iron Cross.
92	Theodor Scherer	Heer	Generalmajor	Commander of 281. Sicherungs-Division and defender of Cholm	5 May 1942	—	A black-and-white photograph of a man wearing a military uniform and a neck order in shape of an Iron Cross. He is wearing glasses and is looking up into the sky.
93	Hermann Graf+	Luftwaffe	Leutnant of the Reserves	Staffelführer of the 9./Jagdgeschwader 52	17 May 1942	Awarded 11th Swords 19 May 1942; 5th Diamonds 16 September 1942	
94	Adolf Dickfeld	Luftwaffe	Leutnant of the Reserves	Pilot in the 7./Jagdgeschwader 52	19 May 1942 (Note: According to Scherzer on 18 May 1942 and not 19 May 1942 as stated by Fellgiebel.)	—	
95	Eberhard von Mackensen	Heer	General der Kavallerie	Commanding general of the III. Panzerkorps	26 May 1942	—	
96	Leopold Steinbatz+	Luftwaffe	Oberfeldwebel	Pilot in the 9./Jagdgeschwader 52	2 June 1942	Awarded 14th Swords 23 June 1942	
97	Hans-Joachim Marseille+	Luftwaffe	Oberleutnant	Pilot in the 3./Jagdgeschwader 27	6 June 1942	Awarded 12th Swords 18 June 1942; 4th Diamonds 3 September 1942	The head and shoulders of a young man, shown in semi-profile. He wears a military uniform with an Iron Cross displayed at the front of his shirt collar. His hair appears blond and short and combed back, his nose is long and straight, and his facial expression is determined but smiling; looking to the left of the camera.
98	Helmut Lent+	Luftwaffe	Major	Gruppenkommandeur of the II./Nachtjagdgeschwader 2	6 June 1942	Awarded 32nd Swords 2 August 1943; 15th Diamonds 31 July 1944	Black-and-white photograph showing the face and upper body of a young man in uniform, his hands behind his back. His hair appears blond and combed to the back. The front right of his jacket bear eagle-and-swastika emblems; the front left of his jacket and the front of his shirt collar bear Iron Cross decorations, black with light outline. He is looking at the camera, his facial expression is secluded.
99	Robert-Georg Freiherr von Malapert	Luftwaffe	Hauptmann	Gruppenkommandeur of the II./Sturzkampfgeschwader 1	8 June 1942*	Killed in action 21 May 1942	—
100	Ludwig Wolff	Heer	Generalmajor	Commander of 22. Infanterie-Division (Luftlande)	22 June 1942	—	A black-and-white photograph of a man in semi profile wearing a military uniform and a neck order in shape of an Iron Cross. His hair appears blond and is combed back.
101	Friedrich Geißhardt	Luftwaffe	Oberleutnant	Pilot and adjutant in the Stab of the I./Jagdgeschwader 77 (Note: According to Scherzer as Staffelkapitän of the 3./Jagdgeschwader 77.)	23 June 1942	—	
102	Heinrich Setz	Luftwaffe	Oberleutnant	Staffelkapitän of the 4./Jagdgeschwader 77	23 June 1942	—	
103	Walter von Brockdorff-Ahlefeldt	Heer	General der Infanterie	Commanding general of the II. Armeekorps	27 June 1942	—	—
104	Rolf Mützelburg	Kriegsmarine	Kapitänleutnant	Commander of U-203	15 July 1942	—	
105	Adalbert Schnee	Kriegsmarine	Kapitänleutnant	Commander of U-201	15 July 1942	—	—
106	Erwin Clausen	Luftwaffe	Oberleutnant	Staffelkapitän of the 6./Jagdgeschwader 77	23 July 1942	—	
107	Viktor Bauer	Luftwaffe	Oberleutnant	Staffelkapitän of the 9./Jagdgeschwader 3 "Udet"	26 July 1942	—	
108	Franz-Josef Beerenbrock	Luftwaffe	Oberfeldwebel	Pilot in the 10./Jagdgeschwader 51 "Mölders"	3 August 1942	—	
109	Anton Hackl+	Luftwaffe	Hauptmann	Staffelkapitän of the 5./Jagdgeschwader 77	9 August 1942 (Note: According to Scherzer on 7 August 1942 and not 9 August 1944 as stated by Fellgiebel.)	Awarded 78th Swords 9 July 1944 (Note: According to Scherzer on 12 July 1944 and not 9 July 1944 as stated by Fellgiebel.)	
110	Traugott Herr+	Heer	Generalmajor	Commander of 13. Panzer-Division	9 August 1942	Awarded 117th Swords 18 December 1944	
111	Werner Kempf	Heer	General der Panzertruppe	Commanding general of the XXXXVIII. Panzerkorps	10 August 1942	—	
112	Gerhard Kollewe	Luftwaffe	Major	Gruppenkommandeur of the II.(Kampf)/Lehrgeschwader 1	16 August 1942	—	
113	Walter Gorn+	Heer	Oberstleutnant	Commander of Kradschützen-Bataillon 59	17 August 1942	Awarded 30th Swords 8 June 1943	—
114	Kurt Brändle	Luftwaffe	Hauptmann	Gruppenkommandeur of the II./Jagdgeschwader 3 "Udet"	27 August 1942	—	
115	Johannes Steinhoff+	Luftwaffe	Hauptmann	Gruppenkommandeur of the II./Jagdgeschwader 52	2 September 1942	Awarded 82nd Swords 28 July 1944	The head and shoulders of a man, shown in semi-profile. He wears a peaked cap and a military uniform with military decorations. His face is scared and his eyes are hidden behind glasses.
116	Walter Sigel	Luftwaffe	Oberstleutnant	Geschwaderkommodore of Sturzkampfgeschwader 3	2 September 1942	—	
117	Johann Zemsky	Luftwaffe	Hauptmann	Gruppenkommandeur of the II./Sturzkampfgeschwader 1	3 September 1942*	Killed in action 28 August 1942	
118	Alfred Druschel+	Luftwaffe	Hauptmann (Note: According to Scherzer as Oberleutnant and not Hauptmann as stated by Fellgiebel.)	Gruppenkommandeur of the I./Schlachtgeschwader 1	3 September 1942	Awarded 24th Swords 19 February 1943	
119	Dr. Ing. Ernst Bormann	Luftwaffe	Oberst	Commander of Gefechtsverband Bormann augmenting Kampfgeschwader 76	3 September 1942	—	
120	Gerhard Hein	Heer	Leutnant of the Reserves	Leader of the 5./Infanterie-Regiment 209	6 September 1942	—	
121	Werner Ziegler+	Heer	Oberleutnant	Leader of the 2./Infanterie-Regiment 186	8 September 1942	Awarded 102nd Swords 23 October 1944	—
122	Wolf-Dietrich Wilcke+	Luftwaffe	Hauptmann	Geschwaderkommodore of Jagdgeschwader 3 "Udet"	9 September 1942	Awarded 23rd Swords 23 December 1942	
123	Klaus Scholtz	Kriegsmarine	Korvettenkapitän	Commander of U-108	10 September 1942	—	—
124	Heinz Schmidt	Luftwaffe	Leutnant	Pilot in the 4./Jagdgeschwader 52	16 September 1942 (Note: According to Scherzer on 15 September 1942.)	—	—
125	Heinrich Bleichrodt	Kriegsmarine	Kapitänleutnant	Commander of U-109	23 September 1942	—	
126	Friedrich-Karl Müller	Luftwaffe	Oberleutnant	Staffelkapitän of the 1./Jagdgeschwader 53 (Note: Both Fellgiebel and Scherzer state that Friedrich-Karl Müller received the Oak Leaves while serving with 1./Jagdgeschwader 3 (JG 3) "Udet", while Prien states that he was serving with 1./Jagdgeschwader 53 (JG 53). 1./JG 53 seems to be correct based upon the chronicles of JG 53 which details the chain of events leading to the awarding of Oak Leaves just 4 days after the Knight's Cross of the Iron Cross.)	23 September 1942	—	—
127	Wilhelm Crinius	Luftwaffe	Feldwebel	Pilot in the 3./Jagdgeschwader 53	23 September 1942	—	
128	Wolfgang Tonne	Luftwaffe	Oberleutnant	Staffelkapitän of the 3./Jagdgeschwader 53	24 September 1942	—	
129	Bruno Ritter von Hauenschild	Heer	Generalmajor	Commander of 24. Panzer-Division	27 September 1942	—	—
130	Hans Beißwenger	Luftwaffe	Leutnant (Note: According to Scherzer as Oberleutnant (war officer) and not Leutnant as stated by Fellgiebel.)	Pilot in the 6./Jagdgeschwader 54	3 October 1942	—	—
131	Ernst-Wilhelm Reinert+	Luftwaffe	Feldwebel	Pilot in the 4./Jagdgeschwader 77	7 October 1942 (Note: According to Scherzer on 5 October 1942 and not 7 October 1942 as stated by Fellgiebel.)	Awarded 130th Swords 1 February 1945	
132	Karl Torley	Heer	Hauptmann	Commander of the I./Infanterie-Regiment 60 (motorized)	11 October 1942	—	—
133	Johannes Kümmel	Heer	Hauptmann	Commander of the I./Panzer-Regiment 8	11 October 1942	—	—
134	Günther Rall+	Luftwaffe	Oberleutnant	Staffelkapitän of the 8./Jagdgeschwader 52	26 October 1942	Awarded 34th Swords 12 September 1943	The head of a young man, shown in semi-profile. He wears a military uniform with a military decoration in shape of an iron cross displayed at the front of his shirt collar. His hair is dark and short and combed to back, his nose is long and straight, he is smiling broadly and looking to the left of the camera.
135	Ludwig Kirschner	Heer	Oberstleutnant	Commander of Infanterie-Regiment 72	28 October 1942	—	—
136	Konrad Hupfer	Heer	Hauptmann	Commander of the I./Infanterie-Regiment 72	28 October 1942	—	—
137	Max Stotz	Luftwaffe	Oberfeldwebel	Pilot in the 5./Jagdgeschwader 54	30 October 1942	—	
138	Heinrich Schweickhardt	Luftwaffe	Hauptmann	Staffelkapitän of the 8./Kampfgeschwader 76 (Note: According to Scherzer as pilot and not Staffelkapitän as stated by Fellgiebel.)	30 October 1942	—	
139	Wolfgang Schenck	Luftwaffe	Hauptmann	Gruppenkommandeur of the I./Zerstörergeschwader 1	30 October 1942	—	The head of a young man, shown in semi-profile. He wears a military uniform with an eagle above his right breast pocket, an iron cross is displayed at the front of his shirt collar. His hair is dark, short and combed to the back, his nose is long and straight, and his facial expression is determined; looking to the right of the camera.
140	Hermann Seitz	Heer	Oberstleutnant	Commander of Panzergrenadier-Regiment 63	31 October 1942	—	—
141	Josef Zwernemann	Luftwaffe	Oberfeldwebel	Pilot in the 7./Jagdgeschwader 52	31 October 1942	—	
142	Wolfgang Lüth+	Kriegsmarine	Kapitänleutnant	Commander of U-181	13 November 1942	Awarded 29th Swords 15 April 1943; 7th Diamonds 9 August 1943	—
143	Werner Töniges	Kriegsmarine	Kapitänleutnant	Commander of Schnellboot S-102 in the 1. Schnellbootflottille	13 November 1942	—	—
144	Hyazinth Graf Strachwitz von Gross-Zauche und Camminetz+	Heer	Oberstleutnant of the Reserves	Commander of the I./Panzer-Regiment 2	13 November 1942	Awarded 27th Swords 28 March 1943; 11th Diamonds 15 April 1944	A smiling man in uniform holding s sheaf of documents
145	Hermann-Bernhard Ramcke+	Luftwaffe	Generalmajor	Commander of Fallschirmjäger-Brigade "Ramcke"	13 November 1942	Awarded 99th Swords 19 September 1944; 20th Diamonds 19 September 1944	Upper body of a man wearing a military uniform with an Iron Cross displayed at the front of his uniform collar.
146	Josef Wurmheller+	Luftwaffe	Leutnant	Pilot in the 7./Jagdgeschwader 2 "Richthofen"	13 November 1942 (Note: According to Scherzer on 14 November 1942 and not on 13 November 1942 as stated by Fellgiebel.)	Awarded 108th Swords 24 October 1944	
147	Karl-Friedrich Merten	Kriegsmarine	Korvettenkapitän	Commander of U-68	16 November 1942	—	—
148	Friedrich Lang+	Luftwaffe	Hauptmann	Staffelkapitän of the 1./Sturzkampfgeschwader 2 "Immelmann"	21 November 1942 (Note: According to Scherzer on 28 November 1942 and not on 21 November 1942 as stated by Fellgiebel.)	Awarded 74th Swords 2 July 1944	
149	Alwin Boerst+	Luftwaffe	Oberleutnant	Staffelkapitän of the 3./Sturzkampfgeschwader 2 "Immelmann"	28 November 1942	Awarded 61st Swords 6 April 1944	—
150	Ekkehard Kylling-Schmidt	Heer	Oberleutnant	Chief of the 4./Füsilier-Regiment 26	4 December 1942	—	—
151	Ernst Nobis	Heer	Oberstleutnant	Commander of Jäger-Regiment 204	5 December 1942	—	—
152	Wolfgang Fischer	Heer	Generalleutnant	Commander of 10. Panzer-Division	9 December 1942	—	—
153	Karl Allmendinger	Heer	Generalleutnant	Commander of 5. Jäger-Division	13 December 1942	—	—
154	Heinrich Paepcke	Luftwaffe	Hauptmann	Gruppenkommandeur of the III./Kampfgeschwader 30 (Note: According to Scherzer as Gruppenkommandeur of the II./Kampfgeschwader 30 and not III. as stated by Fellgiebel.)	19 December 1942*	Killed in action 17 October 1942	
155	Hermann Balck+	Heer	Generalmajor	Commander of 11. Panzer-Division	20 December 1942	Awarded 25th Swords 4 March 1943; 19th Diamonds 31 August 1944	The head and shoulders of a man, shown from the front. He wears a military uniform, and an Iron Cross displayed at the front of his dark uniform collar. His hair is combed to the back, his facial expression is a determined; his eyes are looking into the camera.
156	Walter Heitz	Heer	General der Artillerie	Commanding general of the VIII. Armeekorps	21 December 1942	—	A black-and-white photograph of an older man in semi profile wearing a military uniform. His eyes are looking to the left of the camera
157	Hermann Fegelein? (Note: Hermann Fegelein was court-martialed and sentenced to death on 28 April 1945 by a court led by SS-Brigadeführer and Generalmajor of the Waffen-SS Wilhelm Mohnke. The sentence was carried out the same day. The death sentence resulted in the loss of all orders and honorary signs.)	Waffen-SS	SS-Oberführer	Commander of SS-Kampfgruppe "Fegelein"	22 December 1942	Awarded 83rd Swords 30 July 1944	A black-and-white photograph of a man in semi profile wearing a military uniform and a neck order in shape of an Iron Cross.
158	Helmuth von Ruckteschell	Kriegsmarine	Kapitän zur See of the reserves	Commander of Hilfskreuzer "Michel" (HSK 9)	23 December 1942	—	—
159	Felix Steiner+	Waffen-SS	SS-Gruppenführer and Generalleutnant of the Waffen-SS	Commander of 5. SS-Panzergrenadier-Division "Wiking"	23 December 1942	Awarded 86th Swords 10 August 1944	A man wearing a military uniform and neck order, in the shape of a cross. His hair is combed to the back.
160	Hubert Lanz	Heer	Generalleutnant	Commander of 1. Gebirgs-Division	23 December 1942	—	Lanz is seen at the Nuremberg Trials. He is heavily guarded and is wearing headphones.
161	Helmuth Schlömer	Heer	Generalmajor	Commander of 3. Infanterie-Division (motorized)	23 December 1942	—	—
162	Maximilian Reichsfreiherr von Edelsheim+	Heer	Oberst	Commander of Panzergrenadier-Regiment 26	23 December 1942	Awarded 105th Swords 23 October 1944	—
163	Hartwig von Ludwiger	Heer	Oberst	Commander of Jäger-Regiment 83	23 December 1942	—	—
164	Harald von Hirschfeld	Heer	Hauptmann	Leader of the II./Gebirgsjäger-Regiment 98	23 December 1942	—	—
165	Josef Bremm+	Heer	Oberleutnant of the reserves	Chief of the 5./Infanterie-Regiment 426	23 December 1942	Awarded (159th) Swords 9 May 1945? (Note: Josef Bremm's nomination by the troop was rejected by Major Joachim Domaschk on 30 April 1945 and instead recommended for the German Cross in Gold. Just like all other nominations, which at this point in time were related to members of the 11. Armee, the nomination was not further processed since the 11. Armee had capitulated on 21 April 1945 and presentations to prisoners of war or missing in action were prohibited. In all other instances of similar circumstances a note on the nomination can be found stating: "postpone AOK 11" or "postpone according to AHA 44 Ziff. 572". The entry date noted on the nomination list for the higher grades of the Knight's Cross of the Iron Cross is 28 April 1945. The list indicates a note "deferred". The Association of Knight's Cross Recipients (AKCR) claims that the award was presented in accordance with the Dönitz-decree. This is illegal according to the Deutsche Dienststelle (WASt) and lacks legal justification. The sequential number "159" was assigned by the AKCR. The presentation date was assigned by Walther-Peer Fellgiebel. Bremm was member of the AKCR.)	
166	Helmut Thumm	Heer	Oberst	Commander of Jäger-Regiment 56	23 December 1942	—	—
167	Helmuth von Pannwitz	Heer	Oberst	Leader of the Kampfgruppe "von Pannwitz"	23 December 1942	—	
168	Martin Fiebig	Luftwaffe	Generalleutnant	Commanding general of the VIII. Fliegerkorps	23 December 1942	—	—
