= Combrinck =

Combrinck is a surname. Notable people with the surname include:

- Hannes Combrinck (1971–2020), South African politician
- Peter Combrinck, South African judge
- Ruan Combrinck (born 1990), South African rugby player
- Theodor Bohlmann-Combrinck (1891–1956), general in the Wehrmacht of Nazi Germany
