= Karl Britzelmayr =

- Born: 26 May 1894; Passau, German Empire
- Died: 9 March 1988 (aged 93); Landshut, Bavaria, West Germany
- Military career
- Allegiance: Nazi Germany
- Branch: Army (Wehrmacht)
- Rank: Generalmajor
- Commands: 57 Infanterie-Division; 276. Volksgrenadier-Division; 347. Infanterie-Division; 19. Volksgrenadier-Division
- Conflicts: World War II
- Awards: Knight's Cross of the Iron Cross

Karl Britzelmayr (26 May 1894 – 9 March 1988) was a general in the Wehrmacht of Nazi Germany during World War II who commanded several divisions. He was also a recipient of the Knight's Cross of the Iron Cross.

== Awards and decorations ==
- Knight's Cross of the Iron Cross on 2 February 1942 as Oberstleutnant and commander of Infanterie-Regiment 217
- German Cross in Gold on 9 June 1943 as Oberst in Grenadier-Regiment 217
