= Walter Brandt =

German Luftwaffe pilot (1917–1977)

- Brandt as an Oberfeldwebel
- Born: 24 March 1917; Bad Salzuflen
- Died: 18 January 1977 (aged 59); Bottrop
- Military career
- Allegiance: Nazi Germany
- Branch: Luftwaffe
- Service years: 1939–1945
- Rank: Oberleutnant (first lieutenant)
- Units: LG 2, JG 77, JG 3
- Commands: 2./JG 3, 7./JG 3
- Conflicts: World War II: Operation Barbarossa; Siege of Malta; North African Campaign; Defense of the Reich
- Awards: Knight's Cross of the Iron Cross

Walter Brandt (24 March 1917 – 18 January 1977) was a German Luftwaffe ace and recipient of the Knight's Cross of the Iron Cross during World War II. The Knight's Cross of the Iron Cross, and its variants were the highest awards in the military and paramilitary forces of Nazi Germany during World War II. Brandt was credited with 43 aerial victories in 527 missions.

== Career ==
Brandt was born on 24 March 1917 in Bad Salzuflen in the Principality of Lippe within the German Empire. Following flight training, (Note: Flight training in the Luftwaffe progressed through the levels A1, A2 and B1, B2, referred to as A/B flight training. A training included theoretical and practical training in aerobatics, navigation, long-distance flights and dead-stick landings. The B courses included high-altitude flights, instrument flights, night landings and training to handle the aircraft in difficult situations.) he was transferred to the 2. Staffel (2nd squadron) of Lehrgeschwader 2 (LG 2—2nd Demonstration Wing), a fighter squadron within the I. (Jäger) Gruppe (I.(J)—1st fighter group). Brandt claimed his first aerial victory on 13 March 1941 against the Royal Air Force (RAF) during aerial combat with Supermarine Spitfire fighters 20 kilometers (12 miles) north of Cap Gris-Nez.

=== Eastern Front ===
On 18 June 1941, I.(J)/LG 2 was moved to Bucharest and placed under the command of Jagdgeschwader 77 (JG 77—77th Fighter Wing). The Geschwader was located in the sector of Heeresgruppe Süd (Army Group South). Three days later, I.(J)/LG 2 moved to Roman. That evening, the pilots and ground crews were briefed of the upcoming invasion of the Soviet Union, which opened the Eastern Front.

On 6 January 1942, I.(J)/LG 2 was officially redesignated and became the I. Gruppe of JG 77. On 27 June, I. Gruppe received new orders and began preparations for transfer to Sicily.

=== Malta and North Africa ===
On 29 June 1942, I. Gruppe under the command of Hauptmann Heinrich Bär relocated from the Eastern Front to the Mediterranean theatre of operations. The Gruppe moved from Baherove, via Odessa, Băneasa, Sofia, Thessaloniki to Eleusis, where they arrived on 1 July. The unit was then ordered to Sicily where it arrived at the Comiso airfield on 5 July and was subordinated to the command of Jagdgeschwader 53 Pik-As (JG 53—53rd Fighter Wing). Three days later, Brandt claimed a Spitfire fighter shot down. This was his first aerial victory during the Siege of Malta on a fighter escort mission for Junkers Ju 88 bombers attacking the RAF Luqa airfield. On 10 July, on another Ju 88 escort mission, he yet again claimed a Spitfire shot down. On 13 July, I. Gruppe flew three combat air patrol missions over Malta, during one of which Brandt claimed a further Spitfire destroyed.

On 25 October, I. Gruppe of JG 77 was ordered to trans to the North African theater, arriving at an airfield named Bir el Abd, located southwest of El Alamein, on 27 October. In December, Brandt was awarded the German Cross in Gold (Deutsches Kreuz in Gold).

On 14 January 1943, Brandt was shot down in his Messerschmitt Bf 109 G-2 trop (Werknummer 10744—factory number) 50 kilometers (31 miles) southwest of Buerat, Libya. A Spitfire projectile had nearly severed his right leg prior to him bailing out. Brandt landed in an Italian position and was immediately taken to a nearby field hospital where his right leg had to be amputated. Bär, the commander of I. Gruppe, nominated him for the Knight's Cross of the Iron Cross (Ritterkreuz des Eisernen Kreuzes) which was presented to him while hospitalized in Bavaria on 24 March.

=== Squadron leader and German surrender ===
In August 1944, Brandt was appointed Staffelkapitän (squadron leader) of 2. Staffel of Jagdgeschwader 3 "Udet" (JG 3—3rd Fighter Wing), replacing Oberleutnant Walter Bohatsch in this capacity. On 26 November, he was injured in a takeoff accident at Paderborn when he crashed his Bf 109 G. On 26 November, I. Gruppe, along with other Luftwaffe units, were ordered to participate in a Defense of the Reich mission. The Gruppe, led by Hauptmann Horst Haase, took off from Paderborn and flew into a heavy cloud cover over the airfield. Due to poor visibility conditions, Haase and his wingman, Leutnant Hans Fritz, were killed in a mid-air collision near Erkelenz. Three further aircraft also crashed due to adverse weather conditions. Brandt then took command of the Gruppe, and without sustaining further losses, he safely led the formation back to Paderborn. Following these events, Brandt was arrested and charged with cowardice before the enemy for not continuing the missions. Later, all charges against him were dropped. On 12 December, Brandt claimed a RAF Avro Lancaster heavy bomber shot down. That day, 140 Lancaster bombers attacked the steel works at Witten in the Ruhr. I. Gruppe was scrambled at 12:30 and were vectored to a point of intercept near Dortmund. The Gruppe attacked the bombers, which were unescorted, just prior to their bomb run. The Luftwaffe pilots claimed thirteen bombers shot down, including one by Brandt, for the loss of five of their own.

On 22 January 1945, I. Gruppe relocated to the Eastern Front where they initially occupied an airfield at Stettin-Altdamm, present-day Dąbie in Poland. Here, the Gruppe primarily supported the Army Group Vistula fighting in the Vistula–Oder offensive. On 10 February, the Gruppe was ordered to Pinnow airfield, located approximately 32 kilometers (20 miles) south-southwest of Kolberg, present-day Kołobrzeg. Here on 19 February, Brandt claimed a Lavochkin-Gorbunov-Gudkov LaGG-3 fighter shot down over Madüsee, present day Lake Miedwie. On 3 March, Brandt claimed he had destroyed three Soviet T-34 tanks with bombs, further twenty vehicles by strafing, and shot down three aircraft in aerial combat.This earned him a named reference in the Wehrmachtbericht, a propaganda bulletin. Following these events, Brandt was again injured when his Bf 109 G-14 (Werknummer 464278) was hit, resulting in an emergency landing near Augustwalde, present-day Rębusz in Poland. On 23 March, I. Gruppe was ordered to seize all operations. By 10 April, the Gruppe was fully disbanded and its pilots reassigned to other units. In consequence, Brandt was transferred to II. Gruppe of JG 3 where he was given command of 7. Staffel. He replaced Oberleutnant Herbert Mielke who had been killed in action on 3 April. At the time, II. Gruppe was based at Garz Airfield on the island of Usedom. Here, the Gruppe flew several ground attack missions against Soviet bridges crossing the lower Oder. On 30 April, the Gruppe relocated to Pütnitz and to Leck Airfield on 5 May where the remnants of the Luftwaffe surrendered to British forces.

== Later life ==
Brandt died from complications of his wartime injuries on 28 January 1977 in Bottrop.

== Summary of career ==
=== Aerial victory claims ===
According to US historian David T. Zabecki, Brandt was credited with 57 aerial victories. According to Heaton, Lewis, Olds and Schulze however, Brandt was credited with 42 aerial victories. Dixon also lists him 42 aerial victories claimed in 527 combat missions. Mathews and Foreman, authors of Luftwaffe Aces — Biographies and Victory Claims, researched the German Federal Archives and found records for 42 aerial victory claims. This figure includes 23 aerial victories on the Eastern Front and 19 over the Western Allies, including one four-engined heavy bomber.

Victory claims were logged to a map-reference (PQ = Planquadrat), for example "PQ 66642". The Luftwaffe grid map (Jägermeldenetz) covered all of Europe, western Russia and North Africa and was composed of rectangles measuring 15 minutes of latitude by 30 minutes of longitude, an area of about 360 square miles (930 km^{2}). These sectors were then subdivided into 36 smaller units to give a location area 3 km × 4 km (1.9 mi × 2.5 mi) in size.

Chronicle of aerial victories
This and the ? (question mark) indicates information discrepancies listed by Prien, Stemmer, Rodeike, Bock, Mathews and Foreman.
| Claim | Date | Time | Type | Location | Claim | Date | Time | Type | Location |
– 2.(Jagd) Staffel of Lehrgeschwader 2 – At the Channel and over England — 26 June 1940 – 30 March 1941
| 1 | 13 March 1941 | 15:20 | Spitfire | 20 km (12 mi) north of Cap Gris-Nez | | | | | |
– 2.(Jagd) Staffel of Lehrgeschwader 2 – Operation Barbarossa — 22 June – 5 December 1941
| 2 | 24 June 1941 | 13:10 | SB-2 | | 5 | 23 October 1941 | 16:10 | MiG-3 | |
| 3 | 16 October 1941 | 14:00? (Note: According to Mathews and Foreman claimed at 14:20.) | SB-2 | | 6 | 1 November 1941 | 12:07 | I-15 | |
| 4 | 19 October 1941 | 15:10 | I-15 | | 7 | 1 November 1941 | 12:08 | I-15 | |
– 2. Staffel of Jagdgeschwader 77 – Winter War — 6 January – 30 April 1942
| 8? (Note: This claim is not listed by Mathews and Foreman, nor in the 2005 book by Prien, Stemmer, Rodeike and Bock.) | 15 January 1942 | — | R-5 | | 10 | 20 February 1942 | 14:37 | Pe-2 | |
| 9 | 9 February 1942 | 13:45 | I-15 | | 11 | 3 March 1942 | 13:17 | I-301 (LaGG-3) | |
– 2. Staffel of Jagdgeschwader 77 – Eastern Front — 1 May – 30 June 1942
| 12 | 8 May 1942 | 07:05? (Note: According to Mathews and Foreman claimed at 07:01.) | I-153 | | 18 | 13 June 1942 | 16:15 | Il-2 | vicinity of Taman |
| 13 | 28 May 1942 | 05:21? (Note: According to Mathews and Foreman claimed at 05:24.) | I-16 | PQ 66642 | 19 | 14 June 1942 | 18:48 | I-16 | PQ 66623 |
| 14 | 28 May 1942 | 05:23? (Note: According to Mathews and Foreman claimed at 05:29.) | I-16 | PQ 66654 | 20? (Note: This claim is not listed by Mathews and Foreman, nor in the 2006 book by Prien, Stemmer, Rodeike and Bock.) | 15 June 1942 | — | U-2 | |
| 15 | 2 June 1942 | 12:33 | Yak-1 | | 21 | 26 June 1942 | 17:00 | LaGG-3 | |
| 16? | 4 June 1942 | 12:45 | Yak-1 | | 22 | 28 June 1942 | 16:15 | MiG-3 | |
| 17 | 10 June 1942 | 10:42 | Yak-1 | Taman | 23 | 28 June 1942 | 16:16? (Note: According to Mathews and Foreman claimed at 06:16.) | MiG-3 | |
– 2. Staffel of Jagdgeschwader 77 – Mediterranean Theater, Sicily — 1 July – October 1942
| 24? (Note: This claim is not listed by Mathews and Foreman, nor in the 2004 book by Prien, Stemmer, Rodeike and Bock.) | 8 July 1942 | — | Spitfire | | 33? | 10 August 1942 | — | Spitfire | |
| 25 | 10 July 1942 | 06:33? (Note: According to Mathews and Foreman claimed at 06:35.) | Spitfire | vicinity of Malta | 34? | 13 August 1942 | — | Spitfire | |
| 26 | 13 July 1942 | 08:22 | Spitfire | vicinity of Malta | 35? (Note: This claim is not listed in the 1995 book by Prien.) | 15 September 1942 | 10:17 | Spitfire | vicinity of Malta |
| 27? | 17 July 1942 | — | Spitfire | | 36? | 11 October 1942 | 08:25 | Spitfire | vicinity of Malta |
| 28? | 20 July 1942 | — | Spitfire | | 37 | 14 October 1942 | 08:10 | Spitfire | vicinity of Malta |
| 29? | 26 July 1942 | 16:55 | Spitfire | vicinity of Malta | 38 | 14 October 1942 | 17:50 | Spitfire | vicinity of Malta |
| 30? | 28 July 1942 | — | Spitfire | | 39 | 16 October 1942 | 17:40 | Spitfire | vicinity of Malta |
| 31? | 30 July 1942 | 18:20 | Spitfire | vicinity of Malta | 40? (Note: This claim is not listed by Mathews and Foreman.) | 17 October 1942 | — | Spitfire | |
| 32? | 3 August 1942 | — | Spitfire | | | | | | |
– 2. Staffel of Jagdgeschwader 77 – Mediterranean Theater, North Africa — October – 31 December 1942
| 41 | 7 December 1942 | 15:03 | Spitfire | | 43? | 10 December 1942 | 15:05 | P-40 | northwest of El Agheila |
| 42 | 10 December 1942 | 11:20? (Note: According to Mathews and Foreman claimed at 11:30.) | P-40 | northwest of El Agheila | 44? | 13 December 1942 | 15:37 | P-40 | |
– 2. Staffel of Jagdgeschwader 77 – Mediterranean Theater, North Africa — 1–14 January 1943
| 45? | 12 January 1943 | 15:10 | P-40 | | 47 | 14 January 1943 | 10:20 | P-40 | vicinity of Buerat |
| 46? | 13 January 1943 | 08:37 | P-40 | | | | | | |
– 2. Staffel of Jagdgeschwader 3 "Udet" – Action in the West — August – 31 December 1944
| 48 | 12 December 1944 | 13:54 | Lancaster | PQ 05 Ost KP; Bottrop-Recklinghausen | | | | | |
– 2. Staffel of Jagdgeschwader 3 "Udet" – Eastern Front — January – March 1945
| 49 | 19 February 1945 | 16:07 | LaGG-3 | | 51 | 3 March 1945 | 17:12 | Pe-2 | |
| 50 | 3 March 1945 | 17:10 | Pe-2 | | 52 | 3 March 1945 | 17:13 | LaGG-3 | |

=== Awards ===
- Iron Cross (1939) 2nd and 1st Class
- Honour Goblet of the Luftwaffe on 13 September 1942 as Feldwebel and pilot (Note: According to Obermaier on 5 September 1942.)
- German Cross in Gold on 12 December 1942 as Feldwebel in the 2./Jagdgeschwader 77
- Knight's Cross of the Iron Cross on 24 March 1943 as Oberfeldwebel and pilot in the I./Jagdgeschwader 77 (Note: According to Scherzer as pilot in the 2./Jagdgeschwader 77.)
