= Josef Bremm =

Recipient of the Knight's Cross (1914–1998)

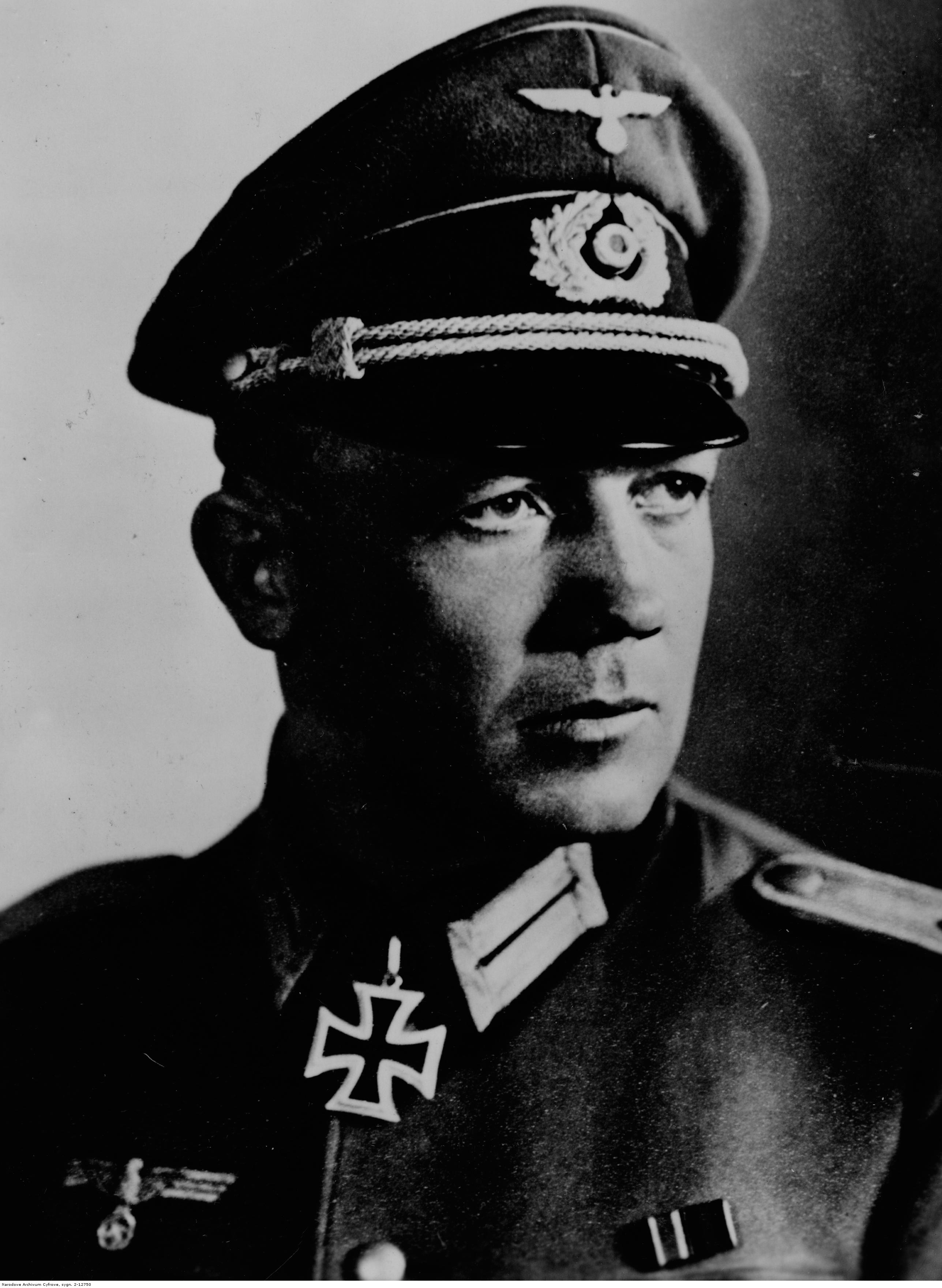
- Born: 3 May 1914; Mannebach, Vulkaneifel, German Empire
- Died: 21 October 1998 (aged 84); Monreal, Germany
- Military career
- Allegiance: Nazi Germany
- Branch: Heer
- Service years: 1935–45
- Rank: Oberstleutnant
- Units: 126th Infantry Division; 712th Infantry Division; 277th Infantry Division; 272nd Volksgrenadier Division
- Conflicts: See battles World War II: Battle of France; Battle of Belgium; Operation Barbarossa; Invasion of Normandy; Battle of the Bulge; Battle of Kassel
- Awards: Knight's Cross of the Iron Cross with Oak Leaves and Swords
- Other work: salesperson for agricultural machines

Josef Benedikt Bremm (3 May 1914 – 21 October 1998) was an officer in the Wehrmacht of Nazi Germany during World War II. He was a recipient of the Knight's Cross of the Iron Cross with Oak Leaves and Swords. Although Veit Scherzer challenged the presentation of the Swords in 2007, Bremm was the highest decorated soldier of the Eifel region.

== Early life and military career ==
Bremm was born in Mannebach, Vulkaneifel, in the German Empire, on 3 May 1914. He was the son of Volksschule teacher Adolf Bremm and his wife Maria, née Müller. He attended the Kurfürst-Balduin-Schule (Baldwin of Luxembourg school) in Münstermaifeld and graduated with his Abitur (university-preparatory high school diploma).

After the National Socialist seizure of power in Germany, he was conscripted into military service in the Heer (army of Nazi Germany) on 1 November 1935. Bremm was posted to Infantry Regiment 7 which was stationed in Schweidnitz, present-day Świdnica in south-western Poland. The regiment was initially subordinated to the 8th Infantry Division, and in October 1936 it formed the nucleus of the newly created 28th Infantry Division. Bremm served three years with this regiment and was promoted to Gefreiter on 1 October 1936, to Unteroffizier (sergeant) on 1 June 1937, to Feldwebel of the Reserves on 1 October 1937, and to Leutnant (second lieutenant) of the Reserves on 29 January 1938. On 31 October 1938, he was discharged from military service and was listed with Infantry Regiment 425. The next day, he joined the Nazi Party.

== World War II ==
Bremm was reactivated as an officer of the reserves on 30 August 1939, one day before the German Invasion of Poland which marked the beginning of World War II in Europe. Initially given the role of platoon leader (Zugführer) in the 2nd battalion of Infantry Regiment 453 (II./Inf.Rgt. 453), a regiment of the 253rd Infantry Division. On 1 November 1939, Bremm was appointed adjutant in II./Inf.Rgt. 453. On 10 May 1940, Bremm, as a member of the 253rd Infantry Division, participated in the Battle of Belgium and Battle of France.

=== Nomination for the Swords to his Knight's Cross ===
In April 1945, Kampfgruppe Bremm, which was also known as Grenadier-Battalion Bremm, and subordinated to the 326th Volksgrenadier Division as part of the 11th Army, had a strength of 150 soldiers and was made up of the remnants of Grenadier-Regiment 990 of the 277th Volksgrenadier Division. Bremm commanded this unit in the vicinity of Kassel. There, supported by Tiger II tanks, he led a number of counterattacks against an armored spearhead of the U.S. Third Army in the Battle of Kassel, for which he was nominated for the Knight's Cross of the Iron Cross with Oak Leaves and Swords (Ritterkreuz des Eisernen Kreuzes mit Eichenlaub und Schwertern). Bremm was never officially awarded the Swords to his Knight's Cross. By the time the nomination was processed, the 11th Army had already surrendered near Blankenburg. Adolf Hitler had forbidden the presentation of awards to soldiers who either were prisoners of war or who were reported as missing in action. Bremm had been nominated by the commanding general of the LXVII. Army Corps General der Infanterie Otto Hitzfeld on 12 April 1945. On 23 April 1945, the OB West, Generalfeldmarschall Albert Kesselring, approved this nomination. The Heerespersonalamt (Army Personnel Agency), department P5, deferred this nomination on 28 April 1945. The Association of Knight's Cross Recipients claims that the Swords were presented in accordance with the Dönitz-decree and assigned the presentation number 159. The Dönitz-decree was assessed by the Deutsche Dienststelle (WASt) in 1988. The WASt concluded the Dönitz-decree to be lacking legal justification.

== Later life ==
Bremm was married to Agnes Steffens (1925–2011), the marriage was childless. He died on 21 October 1998 in Monreal.

== Awards ==
- Iron Cross (1939)
  - 2nd Class (27 June 1940)
  - 1st Class (15 December 1940)
- Infantry Assault Badge (13 November 1941)
- Wound Badge (1939)
  - in Black (17 July 1941)
  - in Silver (1 June 1942)
  - in Gold (12 January 1943)
- Eastern Front Medal (25 July 1942)
- Tank Destruction Badge for Individual Combatants
- Close Combat Clasp in Bronze (1 July 1943)
- Knight's Cross of the Iron Cross with Oak Leaves and Swords
  - Knight's Cross on 18 February 1942 as Leutnant of the Reserves and chief of the 5./Infanterie-Regiment 426
  - 165th Oak Leaves on 23 December 1942 as Oberleutnant of the Reserves and chief of the 5./Grenadier-Regiment 426
  - 159th Swords on 9 May 1945 as Oberstleutnant and commander of Grenadier-Regiment 990 (Note: Josef Bremm's nomination by the troop was rejected by Major Joachim Domaschk on 30 April 1945 and instead recommended for the German Cross in Gold. Just like all other nominations, which at this point in time were related to members of the 11. Armee, the nomination was not further processed since the 11. Armee had capitulated on 21 April 1945 and presentations to prisoners of war or missing in action were prohibited. In all other instances of similar circumstances a note on the nomination can be found stating: "postpone AOK 11" or "postpone according to AHA 44 Ziff. 572". The entry date noted on the nomination list for the higher grades of the Knight's Cross of the Iron Cross is 28 April 1945. The list indicates a note "deferred". The Association of Knight's Cross Recipients (AKCR) claims that the award was presented in accordance with the Dönitz-decree. This is illegal according to the Deutsche Dienststelle (WASt) and lacks legal justification. The sequential number "159" was assigned by the AKCR. The presentation date was assigned by Walther-Peer Fellgiebel. Bremm was member of the AKCR.)

=== Promotions ===
1 October 1936:	Gefreiter
1 June 1937:	Unteroffizier
1 October 1937:	Feldwebel of the Reserves
29 January 1938:	Leutnant (second lieutenant) of the Reserves, effective as 1 January 1938, seniority date 1 October 1938
15 December 1941:	Oberleutnant (first lieutenant) of the Reserves, effective as 1 October 1941, seniority date 1 October 1941
25 March 1942:	Oberleutnant of the Reserves with a seniority date 1 October 1940
4 August 1942:	Oberleutnant, effective as 1 June 1942 transferred to active service in the Heer with a Leutnant seniority date changed to 1 January 1939 and a Oberleutnant seniority date changed to 1 June 1940
3 January 1943:	Hauptmann (captain), effective as 1 January 1943, seniority date 1 January 1943
14 February 1943:	Major (major), effective as 1 February 1942, seniority date 1 February 1943
1 November 1944:	Oberstleutnant, effective as 1 November 1944, seniority date 9 November 1944
