= Theodor Bohlmann-Combrinck =

- Born: 18 November 1891
- Died: 18 November 1956 (aged 65)
- Military career
- Allegiance: German Empire; Weimar Republic; Nazi Germany
- Branch: Army
- Service years: 1913–1920; 1935–1945
- Rank: Generalmajor
- Conflicts: World War II
- Awards: Knight's Cross of the Iron Cross
- Other work: Police officer

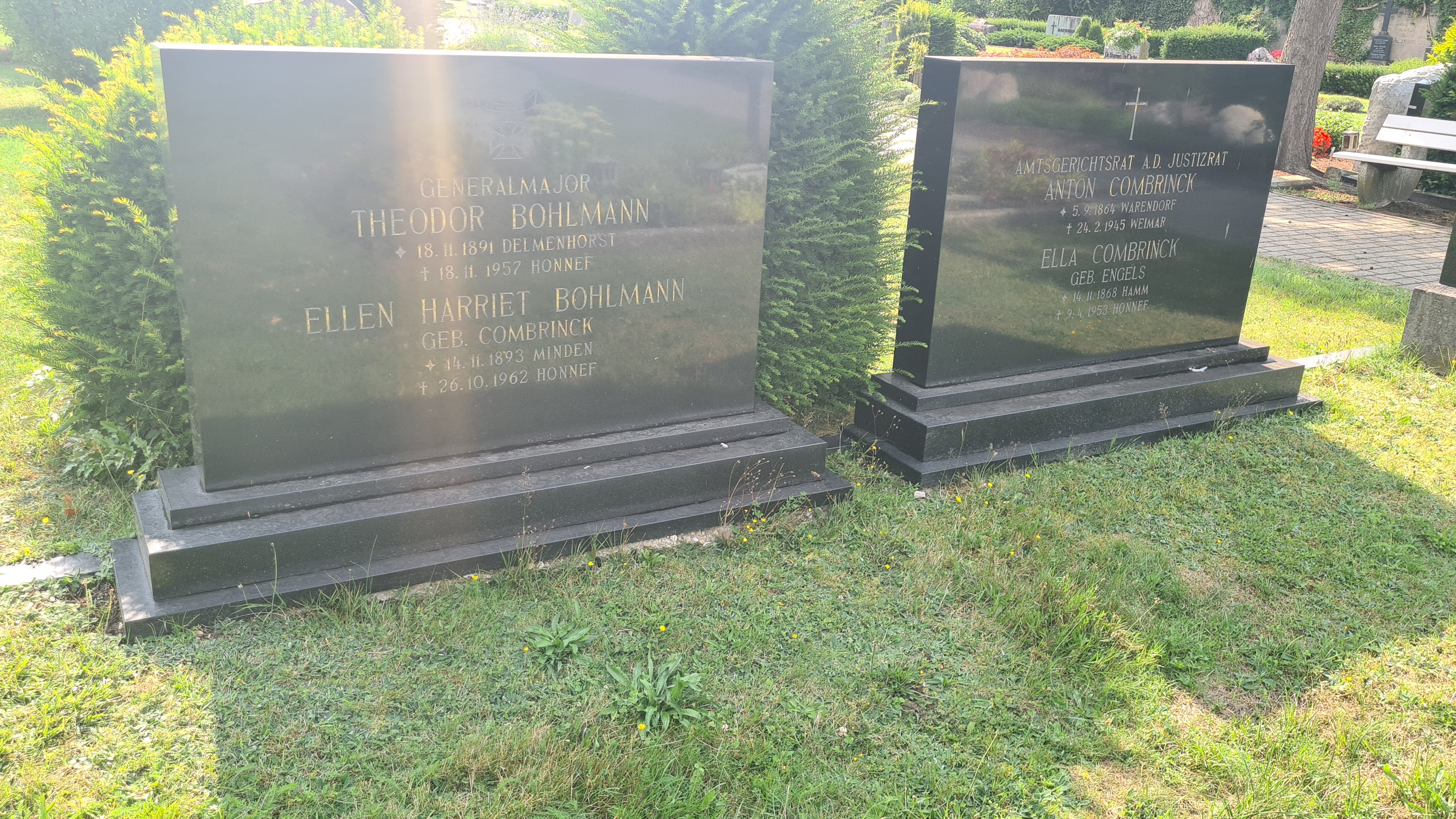
Tomb of Theodor Bohlmann-Combrinck and his wife Harriet at Osthofenfriedhof Hamm

Theodor Bohlmann-Combrinck (18 November 1891 – 18 November 1956) was a general in the Wehrmacht of Nazi Germany during World War II. He was a recipient of the Knight's Cross of the Iron Cross.

== Awards ==
- Knight's Cross of the Iron Cross on 8 August 1941 as Oberst and commander of Schützen-Regiment 111
