= Deutsche Dienststelle (WASt) =

German military archive agency (1939–2019)

Coordinates: 52°35′07″N 13°19′09″E

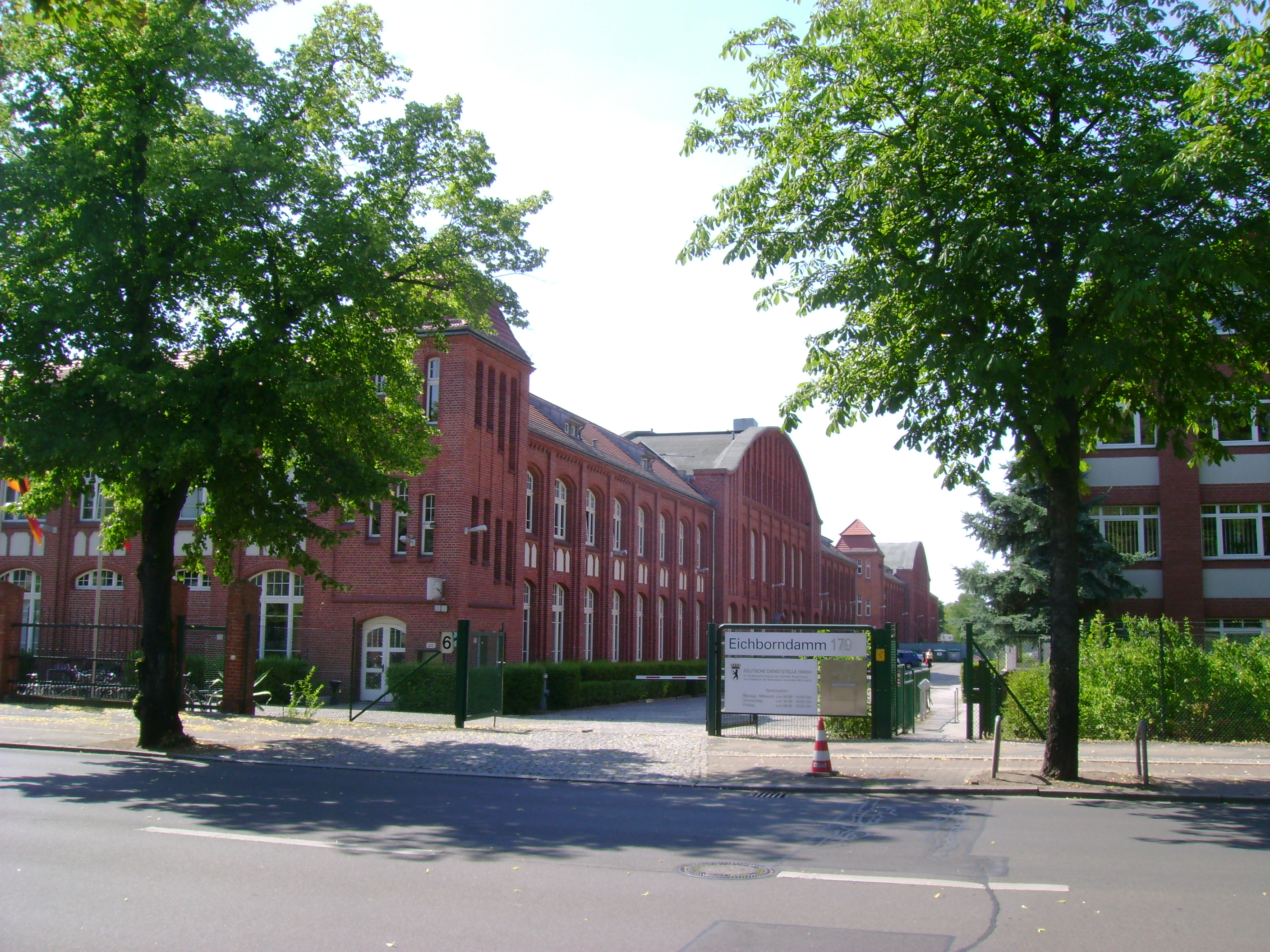
- Deutsche Dienststelle (WASt) in Berlin

Archives overview
- Formed: August 26, 1939 (87 years ago)
- Preceding Archives: Wehrmachtsauskunftstelle für Kriegerverluste und Kriegsgefangene (WASt)
- Dissolved: January 1, 2019
- Superseding Archives: German Federal Archives (German: Bundesarchiv)
- Type: Military archives
- Headquarters: Eichborndamm 179 13403 Berlin
- Website: www.dd-wast.de/de/startseite.html (in German)

Map
- Map of Berlin with the location of the Deutsche Dienststelle (WASt)

The Deutsche Dienststelle (WASt) was a German government agency based in Berlin which maintained records of members of the former German Wehrmacht who were killed in action, as well as official military records of all military personnel during World War II (ca. 18 million) as well as naval military records since 1871 and other war-related records. Formerly called the Wehrmachtsauskunftstelle für Kriegerverluste und Kriegsgefangene (WASt), the agency also provided information about the fate of foreign and German soldiers as well as prisoners of war in Germany. Such information is used for civil proceedings, for an official register of war graves, for historical research and as biographical and genealogical purposes.

The agency was established on 26 August 1939 and had been an agency of the state government of Berlin since 1951. As of 1 January 2019, the agency has been merged with the German Federal Archives (German: Bundesarchiv). The agency is a major source for genealogical and scientific research in various areas.

== History ==
It started its work on 26 August 1939 as Wehrmachtauskunftstelle für Kriegerverluste und Kriegsgefangene (WASt), part of the Wehrmacht, under the auspices of Article No. 77 of the Third Geneva Convention (which related to the treatment of prisoners of war from 27 July 1929).

The text of Article 77 is as follows:

The Detaining Powers shall provide all facilities for the transmission, through the Protecting Power or the Central Prisoners of War Agency provided for in Article 123, of instruments, papers or documents intended for prisoners of war or despatched by them, especially powers of attorney and wills.

In all cases they shall facilitate the preparation and execution of such documents on behalf of prisoners of war; in particular, they shall allow them to consult a lawyer and shall take what measures are necessary for the authentication of their signatures.

=== Headquarters moved several times ===
In August 1943, the archives were divided in two parts. One part of the WASt was transferred to Saalfeld/Saale in Thuringia, the other part moved to Meiningen, also in Thuringia. It was put under American military authority on 12 April 1945, after their occupation of Thuringia. The American forces moved WASt on 1 July 1945 to Fürstenhagen near Kassel, shortly before the Red Army moved in. In January 1946, the archive was relocated to Berlin and renamed the Deutsche Dienststelle. On 14 June 1946, the Allied Control Council devolved some of its role to the French Military Commission.

In 1951, the Federal Government of Germany and the State of Berlin agreed to rename WASt the Deutsche Dienststelle (WASt) für die Benachrichtigung der nächsten Angehörigen von Gefallenen der ehemaligen deutschen Wehrmacht and made it part of the administration of Land Berlin. WASt is now located in Berlin in the Wittenau quarter in the district of Reinickendorf. Its address is Eichborndamm 179.

=== Data from other archives ===
WASt integrated documents from other military and paramilitary archives. In December 1990, it received documents originating from the Potsdam military archive and from the GDR state archive in Dornburg near Zerbst/Anhalt.

WASt's archives were swelled by documents from various former army, navy/marine and other archives about casualties, prisoners of war and so on. WASt has now also become an important source for scientific research.

== Existing files ==
The French author Laurent Guillet, a native of Brittany, conducted research on the Franco-German history during World War II. He listed some important documents from the archives of WASt. The information is recorded below to further assist potential users of WASt.

- Combatants
  - WASt maintain a registry in alphabetical order of more than 18 million military and paramilitary participants of World War II.
- Heer and Luftwaffe
  - It has 100 million personal data records about transfers of World War II soldiers and airmen and their identity discs.
  - It has five million personal documents, e. g. service record books, from soldiers of land and air forces of World War II.
- Kriegsmarine/Seebataillon
  - The archive has two million personal files for naval personnel and minesweeping personnel in the period 1871—1947.
- War graves
- Prisoners of war
  - 15 million personal data files concerning German, Austrian and their allied soldiers, who were captured in the course of World War II by French, American or British troops. There are also discharge documents of prisoners of war coming back from post-war captivity in the Soviet Union.
  - Another 1.5 million files still existing from foreign soldiers who were captured by German forces.

== Role of the Deutsche Dienststelle (WASt) ==
Requests directed to WASt will pass through, according to the wishes of the individual, the following stages:

1. Alphabetical central data file
2. Prisoners of war
3. Marines/Naval forces
4. War cemeteries
5. Identification tags
6. Further external inquiries
7. Written notices

=== The Past ===
Formerly, WASt was tasked with searching for proper documents in order to evaluate old age pensions for German soldiers or their family members who had been left behind. On the other hand, persons who committed war crimes in the German Armed Forces (Wehrmacht), could be identified by this agency.

=== Transfer into Federal Archive ===
Until 2018 the Agency was called the Deutsche Dienststelle (WASt) and was part of the administration of Bundesland Berlin. Effective 1st of January 2019 this agency was dissolved and became a division of the German Federal Archive without changing its mission or location. Nowadays, enquiries are often still fruitful; for example, the German War Graves Commission relies in its search for unknown German war graves, among others, on information obtained from them. It can also provide proof of German descent for would-be immigrants looking to resettle from abroad (e.g. from Poland), as establishing a link to an ancestor who served in the German Armed Forces can provide this.

War children whose fathers were German soldiers or German Prisoners of War can also contact the Agency to research the history of their German fathers who were killed, are listed as missing, or are no longer traceable. Such enquiries to WASt derive mainly from France, Norway, Denmark, The Netherlands, and from Finland. In terms of numbers, there are about 500 enquiries per year from war children born in, or slightly after, World War II, with around 110 per year alone from France. This research is often undertaken as part of a genealogical search for their origins, their unknown procreator and relates to those soldiers who were declared missing, killed in action or are untraceable. WASt can also conduct inquiries for the German families of former German soldiers, for example, to find out if a French war child is searching for their father.
