= List of German brigades in World War II =

This is a list of German brigades in World War II. The list aims to include all brigade-level military formations of the German Wehrmacht and Waffen-SS during World War II.

Brigades, in German army parlance prior to 1944, generally designated formations of two regiments from the same branch of arms. For instance, 2. Panzer-Brigade contained the Panzer Regiments 3 and 4. The usage of the term shifted in the army after 30 May 1944, when it was redefined to apply to singular strengthened regiments.

== Heer ==
=== Infantry brigades ===
The number of infantry brigades increased notably after 30 May 1944, when the previously-accepted meaning of brigade, group of two regiments of the same branch, was changed to instead designate a singular strengthened regiment. In such a fashion, the Grenadier Regiments 193, 308 and 503 in Finland became Grenadier Brigades. Grenadier Brigade 761 was an emergency formation formed from Finland veterans in Danzig in July 1944, and the Grenadier Brigades 1131 through 1136 were rapidly raised in various military districts in late July 1944, to be used as autonomous military formations.

List of Wehrmacht infantry brigades
German name	Translated name	Notes
Afrika-Brigade 999	Afrika-Brigade 999	Main article: Afrika-Brigade 999 Formed on 6 October 1942 on Heuberg Training Area as a penal unit. It consisted of convicted political prisoners and violent criminals pressed into military service. Initially consisted of Afrika Riflemen Regiments 691 and 962 as well as the Signals Company 999. Upgraded to divisional status on 2 February 1943 (999th Division).
Brigade 1005	Brigade 1005	Active in the Upper Rhine area between 7 January and 8 April 1945. Staffed at times by customs officers and Volkssturm units as well as by the staff of Grenadier Regiment 726 of 716th Infantry Division. Dissolved on 8 April 1945, along with Brigade Baur, and used in the redeployment of 89th Infantry Division. Known initially as Brigade Hübner (see below).
Brigade Baur	Brigade Baur	Formed in February 1945 in the Upper Rhine area with two grenadier regiments. Dissolved on 8 April 1945, along with Brigade 1005, and used in the redeployment of 89th Infantry Division.
Brigade Hübner	Brigade Hübner	Formed in January 1945 from the staff of Reserve Grenadier Regiment 28 in German-occupied southwestern France; became Brigade 1005 (see above) almost immediately.
Brigade Lötzen	Brigade Lötzen	Main article: Lötzen Infantry Brigade (Wehrmacht) Formed on 16 August 1939 from Landwehr formations in the Lötzen area in East Prussia for defensive purposes. Under command of 3rd Army during the Invasion of Poland, as part of Corps Brand. Participated in the Battle of Lomza by contributing the Landwehr Infantry Regiment 162 to the German attack on 10 September. Dissolved on 1 November 1939 and subsequently integrated into the 311th Infantry Division, along with the other elements of its ad-hoc formation.
Brigade z.b.V. 100	Brigade z.b.V. 100	Formed in February 1945 in Lusatia from parts of Group Berger. Likely contained elements of Volksgrenadier Regiments 94 and 97 as well as Anti-Tank Company 100.
Grenadier-Brigade (mot.) 92	Grenadier Brigade (motorized) 92	After 11 January 1945: Panzergrenadier Brigade 92 (Panzer-Grenadier-Brigade 92), formed on 5 June 1944 from Grenadier Regiment (mot.) 92, which in turn had been formed on 2 May 1943 from forces of Sonderverband 287 (Free Arabian Legion). Spent most of the war under Army Group F in German-occupied Yugoslavia.
Grenadier-Brigade 193	Grenadier Brigade 193	Formed by decree of 30 May 1944 from Grenadier Regiment 193, which as Infantry Regiment 193 had previously served with 16th Infantry Division. Later used as part of 69th Infantry Division in German-occupied Norway.
Grenadier-Brigade 388	Grenadier Brigade 388	Formed on 30 May 1944 from the Reinforced Grenadier Regiment 388 (15 October 1942 redesignation of Grenadier Regiment 388 of 214th Infantry Division). Part of 20th Mountain Army. Participated in the German defense against the Sovet Petsamo–Kirkenes offensive as part of the 6th Mountain Division.
Grenadier-Brigade 503	Grenadier Brigade 503	Formed in June 1944 from Luftwaffe Field Regiment 503. Part of 20th Mountain Army.
Grenadier-Brigade (bo) 761	Grenadier Brigade (static) 761	Sent to the Eastern Front in response to Operation Bagration; arrival on 7 July 1944 in Vilnius without heavy weapons or proper brigade-level equipment. Failed to keep Vilnius air port secure long enough to enable 16th Parachute Regiment to fully land in Vilnius. Part of Korps-Abteilung D. Dissolved on 10 September 1944 and remnant parts integrated into 56th Division as Grenadier Regiment 234.
Grenadier-Brigade (mot.) 1027	Grenadier Brigade (motorized) 1027	Redesignation of Grenadier Regiment (mot.) 1027 on 30 May 1944. Dissolved on 1 July 1944 and integrated in Panzergrenadier Regiments 9 and 67 of 26th Panzer Division.
Grenadier-Brigade 1131	Grenadier Brigade 1131	Formed on 27 July 1944 as a valkyrie unit, eventually integrated into the 542nd Grenadier Division around November 1944.
Grenadier-Brigade 1132	Grenadier Brigade 1132	Formed on 28 July 1944 as a valkyrie unit, integrated on 22 September 1944 into Grenadier Regiment 130 as staff and 1st Battalion.
Grenadier-Brigade 1133	Grenadier Brigade 1133	Formed on 24 July 1944 as a valkyrie unit, integrated on 18 August 1944 into the 88th Infantry Division.
Grenadier-Brigade 1134	Grenadier Brigade 1134	Formed on 26 July 1944 as a valkyrie unit. Reduced on 1 September 1944 into Combat Battalion 1134 (Kampf-Bataillon 1134) as a result of casualties; grouped under 359th Infantry Division. Dissolved on 18 September 1944.
Grenadier-Brigade 1135	Grenadier Brigade 1135	Formed on 27 July 1944 as a valkyrie unit. Dissolved on 28 August 1944 and integrated into 291st Infantry Division.
Grenadier-Brigade 1136	Grenadier Brigade 1136	Initially designated Gebirgsjäger Regiment 36. Formed on 27 July 1944 as a valkyrie unit. Dissolved on 14 September 1944. Remnants initially intended for 544th Volksgrenadier Division, but then used to form Division Fusilier Battalion 545 instead.
Grenadier-Lehr-Brigade	Grenadier Training Brigade	Formed on 4 June 1944 from Infantry Training Regiment (Infanterie-Lehr-Regiment) of Army Group C, intended first to become part of 98th Infantry Division as Grenadier Training Brigade 290 on 19 September and then to become part of 44th Infantry Division as Grenadier Regiment 131 on 17 October, but was instead integrated into 98th Infantry Division as Grenadier Training Regiment 117 (organizationally absorbing the previous 117th Regiment, which did not carry the "Lehr" designation) on 18 October 1944.
Infanterie-Brigade 599 (russ.)	Infantry Brigade 599 (Russian)	Formed in German-occupied Denmark. Part of the RLA ("Vlasov Army"). Spent the end of the war as parts of Division z.b.V. 614 and Regiment 1604.
Kroatische Ausbildungs-Brigade	Croatian Training Brigade	Formed on 20 April 1943 in Stockerau (Wehrkreis XVII) from the Croatian Training Regiment 369 (see also: 369th (Croatian) Infantry Division) with a total of 21 companies, including an officer training company, an infantry signals company, a German wounded soldiers recovery company, and two bicycle training companies. Also included an artillery training detachment and a mixed training detachment. Still in Stockerau in 1944, when it also included the Croatian-French-Arab Special Company Döllersheim.
Lehr-Brigade (mot.) 900	Training Brigade (motorized) 900	Main article: Lehr-Brigade (mot.) 900 Formed on 17 June 1941 by Döberitz Infantry School, staffed with a motorized infantry regiment (no. 900), as well as a Panzerjäger detachment, an artillery detachment, a pioneer battalion, a signals detachment and supply units, each designated with the ordinal number 900. Dissolved on 7 April 1942; staff reintegrated into Döberitz Infantry School.
MG-Ski-Brigade Finnland	Machine Gun Ski Brigade Finland	Formed in July 1944 in Finland to serve as joint command for the Machine Gun Battalions 4, 13, and 14, all deployed in Finland.
Skijäger-Brigade 1	Ski Jäger Brigade 1	Formed in September 1943 under Army Group Centre from six separate Jäger battalions under command of the army group. Consisted of two Ski Jäger Regiments (no. 1&2) and a heavy ski battalion (no. 1). Fought between February and May 1944 as part of 2nd Army, first under XXIII Corps and then under LVI Corps. Expanded on 2 June 1944 into 1st Ski Division.

=== Assault brigades ===
List of Wehrmacht assault brigades
German name	Translated name	Notes
Sturm-Brigade XI	Assault Brigade XI	Staff formed on 2 March 1943 in Wehrkreis XI; later used on 12 May 1943 to form the Division Sardinia on Sardinia (used on 6 July 1943 to form 90th Panzergrenadier Division).
Sturm-Brigade Rhodos	Assault Brigade Rhodes	Formed in March 1943 from those elements of 22nd Infantry Division that had been previously transferred from Crete to Rhodes. Initially contained four companies that were initially from Infantry Regiments 16 and 65 (2./16, 3./16, 8./65, 11./65), as well as an anti-tank company. Subsequently formed Grenadier Regiment Rhodes (Grenadier-Regiment Rhodos) in June 1943 as part of Assault Division Rhodes (formed 31 May 1943); the regiment was eventually destroyed near Belgrade in October 1944 and its remnants absorbed into Panzergrenadier Division Brandenburg.

=== Gebirgsjäger brigades ===
List of Wehrmacht Gebirgsjäger brigades
German name	Translated name	Notes
Gebirgsjäger-Brigade 139	Mountain Brigade 139	Redesignation (5 June 1944) of Mountain Regiment 139 (Gebirgsjäger-Regiment 139), which had been formed in August 1938 from Austrian formations. Placed under supervision of Division z.b.V. 140 in late 1944. Carried the designation "Generaloberst Dietl" in 1945. Saw service in the Lapland War in late 1944.

=== Fortress brigades ===
List of Wehrmacht fortress brigades
German name	Translated name	Notes
Festungsbrigade 135	Fortress Brigade 135	Staff formed in April 1944 and placed in command of the three fortress battalions on occupied Corsica (no. 905, 906, 907) and the two fortress battalions on occupied Elba (no. 902, 908). Placed under command of Army Liguria in 1945. Commanded by Kurt Almers. Alternatively known as Festungsbrigade Almers.
Festungsbrigade 963	Fortress Brigade 963	4 July 1944 redesignation of Fortress Infantry Regiment 963 (formerly Afrika Riflemen Regiment 963), deployed to occupied Lemnos. Placed in charge of III through V fortress infantry battalions of the 999th.
Festungsbrigade 964	Fortress Brigade 964	4 July 1944 redesignation of Fortress Infantry Regiment 964. Placed under XXII Corps in Army Group E. Deployed first to Lefkos island, then from Sept. 1944 in Albania, 1945 in Croatia.
Festungsbrigade 966	Fortress Brigade 966	4 July 1944 redesignation of Fortress Infantry Regiment 966 (leadership unit for fortress infantry battalions VII through XI of 999th Division). Placed under XXII Corps and deployed to Cephalonia, later in Serbia. 1945 in Croatia.
Festungsbrigade 967	Fortress Brigade 967	4 July 1944 redesignation of Fortress Infantry Regiment 967 (leadership unit for fortress infantry battalions X through XIII of 999th Division). Initially deployed to Kos island, then to Athens and eventually to Salonika. 1945 in Brod, Croatia.
Festungsbrigade 968	Fortress Brigade 968	4 July 1944 redesignation of Fortress Infantry Regiment 968 (leadership unit for fortress infantry battalions XIV through XVII of 999th Division). Initially deployed to Leros island.
Festungsbrigade 969	Fortress Brigade 969	4 July 1944 redesignation of Fortress Infantry Regiment 969 (subordinate unit of Replacement Brigade 999 (see replacement brigades)) Initially deployed at Larissa.
Festungsbrigade 1017	Fortress Brigade 1017	4 July 1944 redesignation of Fortress Brigade Corfu (see below). Redeployed from Corfu in September 1944 to Albania, 1945 to Croatia.
Festungsbrigade Almers	Fortress Brigade Almers	Alternative name for Fortress Brigade 135 (see above).
1. Festungsbrigade Kreta	1st Fortress Brigade Crete	Formed on 15 January 1942 from staff personnel of 713th Infantry Division with elements of Infantry Regiment 746 and Landesschützen Battalions 832 through 834. Redesignated "German Railway Security Staff Croatia" (Deutscher Eisenbahn-Sicherungsstab Kroatien) on 23 November 1942.
2. Festungsbrigade Kreta	2nd Fortress Brigade Crete	Formed on 10 February 1942 in Dresden. Redesignated "Fortress Brigade Crete" (Festungsbrigade Kreta; without ordinal number) on 20 July 1942. Equipped with Panzer Detachment Crete (from 5th Detachment, Panzer Regiment 31; later became Panzer Detachment 212), as well as Fortress Infantry Regiment 746 and Fortress Battalions 621, 622, and 623. Strengthened on 9 September 1942 by elements of Fortress Division Crete (164th Infantry Division). Redesignated 133rd Fortress Division on 2 February 1944.
Festungsbrigade Korfu	Fortress Brigade Corfu	13 June 1944 redesignation of Fortress Infantry Regiment 1017. Placed under command of XXII Corps. Redesignated Fortress Brigade 1017 on 4 July 1944.
Festungsbrigade Lofoten	Fortress Brigade Lofoten	Formed in November 1944 to guard the Lofoten archipelago in occupied Norway. At times under LXXI Army Corps and Army Detachment Narvik, both under 20th Mountain Army.

=== Replacement brigades ===
List of Wehrmacht replacement brigades
German name	Translated name	Notes
Ersatz-Brigade 201	Replacement Brigade 201	Formed on 15 June 1941 in Fulda (Wehrkreis IX), simply known as Brigade 201 until 24 June 1941. Assembled as part of the 16th Aufstellungswelle. Deployed to the General Government on 11 July 1941 with Infantry Replacement Regiments 601, 609 and 611. Transferred three battalions to Army Group North on 6 December 1941. Redeployed from Krakow to the Army Group Rear Area of Army Group Centre on 19 January 1942. Became Security Brigade 201 (see: Security brigades) on 5 February 1942 (eventually: 201st Security Division).
Ersatz-Brigade 202	Replacement Brigade 202	Formed on 15 June 1941 in Mannheim (Wehrkreis XII), simply known as Brigade 202 until 17 June 1941. Assembled as part of the 16th Aufstellungswelle. Deployed to the General Government in July 1941 with Infantry Replacement Regiments 602, 610 and 612. Transferred one battalion to Army Group North on 10 October 1941. Redeployed to German-occupied Belarus; redesignated Security Brigade 202 on 24 December 1941; subsequently became Oberfeldkommandantur 392.
Ersatz-Brigade 203	Replacement Brigade 203	Formed on 14 June 1941 in Potsdam (Wehrkreis III), simply known as Brigade 203 until 25 June 1941. Assembled a part of the 16th Aufstellungswelle. Deployed to the General Government in July 1941 with the Infantry Replacement Regiments 603, 608 and 613. Redesignated Security Brigade 203 on 24 December 1941 and sent to Kielce in the Rear Area of Army Group Centre; subsequently upgraded into the 203rd Security Division.
Ersatz-Brigade 204	Replacement Brigade 204	Formed on 15 June 1941 in Wehrkreis XVII, simply known as Brigade 204 until 25 June 1941. Assembled as part of the 16th Aufstellungswelle. Deployed to the General Government and subsequently to the German-occupied Baltic States in July 1941. Contained the Infantry Replacement Regiments 605, 606, and 607. Transferred four battalions to Army Group North between 10 and 15 December 1941 and subsequently became Oberfeldkommandantur 394 (Riga) on 27 April 1942.
Ersatz-Brigade 999	Replacement Brigade 999	Alternative designation for Replacement Battalion 999, which had been formed on 14 February 1943 on Heuberg Training Area as a replacement provision unit for 999th Division. Alternate designation as "Replacement Brigade 999" in use between 10 December 1943 and September 1944, when the battalion/brigade was present at Baumholder Military Base. Dissolved in September 1944 and split into four separate formations, each titled Action Battalion (Einsatz-Bataillon), numbered 1./999, 2./999, 3./999 and 4./999.
Ersatz-Brigade Feldherrnhalle	Replacement Brigade Feldherrnhalle	Formed on 1 September 1944 in Danzig as replacement brigade for Panzergrenadier Division Feldherrnhalle. Destroyed in West Prussia, partially reassembled in Magdeburg and Parchim. Those reassembled elements were integrated into Panzer Division Clausewitz on 6 April 1945.
Ersatz-Brigade Großdeutschland	Replacement Brigade Großdeutschland	Staff formed on 1 June 1942 to oversee the replacement units of Großdeutschland division. Temporarily equipped with a training detachment for mobile forces between 10 February 1943 and 1 January 1944. Staffed with a dedicated officer cadet training school after 1 August 1944. Deployed to the Lusatia region in February 1945 and absorbed into Panzergrenadier Division Brandenburg on 10 March 1945. Redeployed in Schleswig-Holstein on 4 April 1945 as Panzer Training Unit Großdeutschland. Ultimately taken prisoner by British forces as part of 15th Panzer Division.

=== Rifle/Panzergrenadier brigades ===
The Rifle Regiments and Cavalry Rifle Regiments of the Wehrmacht mobile troops, as well as the brigades overseeing them, had their own numbering, separate from the more conventional infantry forces.

In the 1939 basic layout of a Panzer Division, each division was equipped with a Rifle Brigade (German: Schützen-Brigade), which in turn was the superior unit of one Rifle Regiment (German: Schützen-Regiment) of three battalions and of a separate motorcycle battalion (German: Kradschützen-Bataillon). This basic layout was overhauled in 1940; from then on, Rifle Brigades generally oversaw two Rifle Regiments instead of one, and each Rifle Regiment had two battalions each instead of three, thus bringing the number of total rifle battalions in a Rifle Brigade from three to four, but dropping the motorcycle battalion.

On 15 October 1942, the motorized infantry formations, including all previous Rifle Brigades, were given the new designation "Panzergrenadier", becoming Panzergrenadier Brigades.

List of Wehrmacht Panzergrenadier brigades
German name	Translated name	Notes
Führer-Begleit-Brigade	Führer Escort Brigade	Main article: Führerbegleitbrigade Formed in November 1944 by upgrading the Führer Escort Battalion. Originally assembled in Rastenburg. Consisted of two Panzergrenadier Battalions, the Sturmgeschütz Brigade 200, a reconnaissance company, an artillery detachment and a field replacement battalion as well as a bicycle battalion. Upgraded on 26 January 1945 to divisional status to become the Führer Escort Division (Führer-Begleit-Division), assigned to the Eastern Front and destroyed in the Spremberg cauldron towards the end of April 1945.
Führer-Grenadier-Brigade	Führer Grenadier Brigade	Main article: Führer Grenadier Brigade Formed in July 1944 in East Prussia by upgrading the strengthened Führer Grenadier Battalion. Included a panzer detachment of Panther tanks. Upgraded on 26 January 1945 to divisional status to become the Führer-Grenadier-Division. Surrendered to American forces in Zwettl, later handed over to the Red Army.
1. Schützen-Brigade	1st Rifle Brigade	Formed on 12 September 1935, renamed 1. Panzergrenadier-Brigade on 5 July 1942. Part of 1st Panzer Division. Dissolved in summer of 1943.
2. Schützen-Brigade	2nd Rifle Brigade	Formed on 15 October 1935 to provide staff support to the rifle units of 2nd Panzer Division. Redesignated 2. Panzergrenadier-Brigade on 5 July 1943. Dissolved in summer 1943.
3. Schützen-Brigade	3rd Rifle Brigade	Formed on 15 October 1935 to provide staff support to the rifle units of 3rd Panzer Division. Redesignated 3. Panzergrenadier-Brigade on 5 July 1942. Dissolved in November 1942.
4. Schützen-Brigade	4th Rifle Brigade	Formed on 1 November 1939 in Bamberg to provide staff support to the rifle units of 4th Panzer Division. Redesignated 4. Panzergrenadier-Brigade on 5 July 1942. Became Brigade z.b.V. 4 (Brigade z.b.V. 4) on 7 November 1942.
5. Schützen-Brigade	5th Rifle Brigade	Formed on 1 November 1939 to provide staff support to the rifle units of 5th Panzer Division (Rifle Regiments 13 and 14). Redesignated 5. Panzergrenadier-Brigade on 5 July 1942. Dissolved in November 1942.
6. Schützen-Brigade	6th Rifle Brigade	Formed on 1 April 1939 to provide staff support for the rifle units of 1st Light Division. Redesignated 6. Panzergrenadier-Brigade on 5 July 1942. Dissolved on 10 November 1942.
7. Schützen-Brigade	7th Rifle Brigade	Formed on 27 October 1939 to provide staff support for the rifle regiments of the 7th Panzer Division (Rifle Regiments 6 and 7). Redesignated 7. Panzergrenadier-Brigade on 5 July 1942. Likely effectively dissolved in November 1942, but present in German postal records until December 1943.
8. Schützen-Brigade	8th Rifle Brigade	Formed on 4 November 1939 from the staff of Cavalry Rifle Regiment 9 to provide staff support for the rifle regiments of 8th Panzer Division (Cavalry Rifle Regiments 8 and 9). Redesignated 8. Panzergrenadier-Brigade on 5 July 1942. Dissolved in November 1942.
9. Schützen-Brigade	9th Rifle Brigade	Formed on 16 February 1940 in Wehrkreis XVII to provide staff support for the rifle regiments of 9th Panzer Division (Rifle Regiments 10 and 11). Commanded by Wilhelm von Apell between 1941 and 1942. Redesignated 9. Panzergrenadier-Brigade on 5 July 1942. Dissolved on 15 December 1942.
10. Schützen-Brigade	10th Rifle Brigade	Formed on 27 October 1939 in Wehrkreis IX to provide staff support for the rifle regiments of 10th Panzer Division (Rifle Regiments 69 and 86). Redesignated 10. Panzergrenadier-Brigade on 5 July 1942. Dissolved in 1943.
11. Schützen-Brigade	11th Rifle Brigade	Formed on 8 December 1939 as an autonomous Rifle Brigade for the Rifle Regiments 110 and 111. Participated in Operation Weserübung as part of XXXI Army Corps. Used to form the 11th Panzer Division on 1 August 1940; a formation by the previous designation is subsequently formed anew in the 11th Panzer Division. Redesignated 11. Panzergrenadier-Brigade on 5 July 1942. Dissolved in 1943. Plagued by mobility problems while preparing offensive operations in 1943.
12. Schützen-Brigade	12th Rifle Brigade	Formed on 9 December 1940 in Wehrkreis II to provide staff support to the rifle regiments of 12th Panzer Division. Redesignated 12. Panzergrenadier-Brigade on 11 July 1942. Dissolved on 22 November 1942.
13. Schützen-Brigade	13th Rifle Brigade	Formed on 18 October 1940 in Wehrkreis XI to provide staff support for the rifle regiments of 13th Panzer Division (Rifle Regiments 66 and 93). Staff sent to Romania on 8 November 1940 as "Training Infantry Staff R" (Lehr Infanterie Stab R). Recalled to Germany on 20 May 1941 and redesignated 13th Rifle Brigade. Renamed to 13. Panzergrenadier-Brigade on 5 July 1942. Dissolved on 1 November 1942.
14. Schützen-Brigade	14th Rifle Brigade	Formed on 19 August 1940 to provide staff support for the rifle regiments of 14th Panzer Division (Rifle Regiments 103 and 108). Redesignated 14. Panzergrenadier-Brigade on 18 July 1942. Dissolved on 15 November 1942.
15. Schützen-Brigade	15th Rifle Brigade	Formed on 15 October 1940 in Wehrkreis XII from elements of Rifle Regiments 104 and 115 to serve as a brigade staff for both. Redesignated 15. Panzergrenadier-Brigade on 5 July 1942. Dissolved in 1943.
16. Schützen-Brigade	16th Rifle Brigade	Formed on 3 August 1940 in Wehrkreis VI from parts of the dissolved staff of 3rd Battalion, Rifle Regiment 4. Provided staff support to Rifle Regiments 64 and 79. Redesignated 16. Panzergrenadier-Brigade on 5 July 1942. Dissolved in November 1942.
17. Schützen-Brigade	17th Rifle Brigade	Formed on 1 November 1940 in Wehrkreis VII for the rifle regiments of 17th Panzer Division (Rifle Regiments 40 and 63). Redesignated 17. Panzergrenadier-Brigade on 5 July 1942. Personnel used on 10 October 1944 to form part of the staff of the IV Panzer Corps.
18. Schützen-Brigade	18th Rifle Brigade	Formed on 26 October 1940 in Wehrkreis IV to provide staff support to the rifle regiments of 18th Panzer Division (Rifle Regiments 52 and 101). Redesignated 18. Panzergrenadier-Brigade on 5 July 1942. Later becomes Bicycle Infantry Brigade 10 in January 1945.
19. Schützen-Brigade	19th Rifle Brigade	Formed on 1 November 1940 in Wehrkreis XI to lead Rifle Regiments 73 and 74. Redesignated 19. Panzergrenadier-Brigade on 5 July 1942. Used in June 1944 to form the staff of the 1st Ski Division.
20. Schützen-Brigade	20th Rifle Brigade	Formed on 1 November 1940 in Wehrkreis IX to provide staff support for the rifle regiments of 20th Panzer Division (Rifle Regiments 59 and 112). Redesignated 20. Panzergrenadier-Brigade on 5 July 1942. Dissolved in 1943.
22. Schützen-Brigade	22nd Rifle Brigade	Formed on 24 October 1941 in northern France under the supervision of 7th Army to provide staff support for the Rifle Regiments 129 and 140. Redesignated 22. Panzergrenadier-Brigade on 5 July 1942. Dissolved in November 1942.
23. Schützen-Brigade	23rd Rifle Brigade	Formed on 15 October 1941 in Stuttgart (Wehrkreis V) to provide staff support for the rifle regiments of 23rd Panzer Division (Rifle Regiments 126 and 128). Redesignated 23. Panzergrenadier-Brigade on 5 July 1942. Dissolved in November 1942.
24. Schützen-Brigade	24th Rifle Brigade	Formed on 2 December 1941 in Stablack in East Prussia from personnel of Horse Brigade 1. Redesignated 24. Panzergrenadier-Brigade on 5 July 1942. Destroyed in the Battle of Stalingrad.
26. Panzergrenadier-Brigade	26th Panzergrenadier Brigade	Formed on 27 July 1942 using personnel of 23rd Division in German-occupied France staff to provide staff support for the rifle regiments of 26th Panzer Division. (Rifle Regiments 9 and 67). Dissolved on 10 November 1942.
92. Panzergrenadier-Brigade	92nd Panzergrenadier Brigade	11 January 1945 redesignation of 92nd (motorized) Grenadier Brigade. Reinforced on 31 January 1945 and strengthened by Artillery Detachment 192, Pioneer Battalion 192, and Panzerjäger Detachment 192. Placed under command of Army Group South (2nd Panzer Army in March, 8th Army in April/May).
190. Panzergrenadier-Brigade	190th Panzergrenadier Brigade	Staff marked up for deployment on German-occupied Sardinia with 90th Panzergrenadier Division in July 1943. Never actually saw deployment.

=== Panzer brigades ===
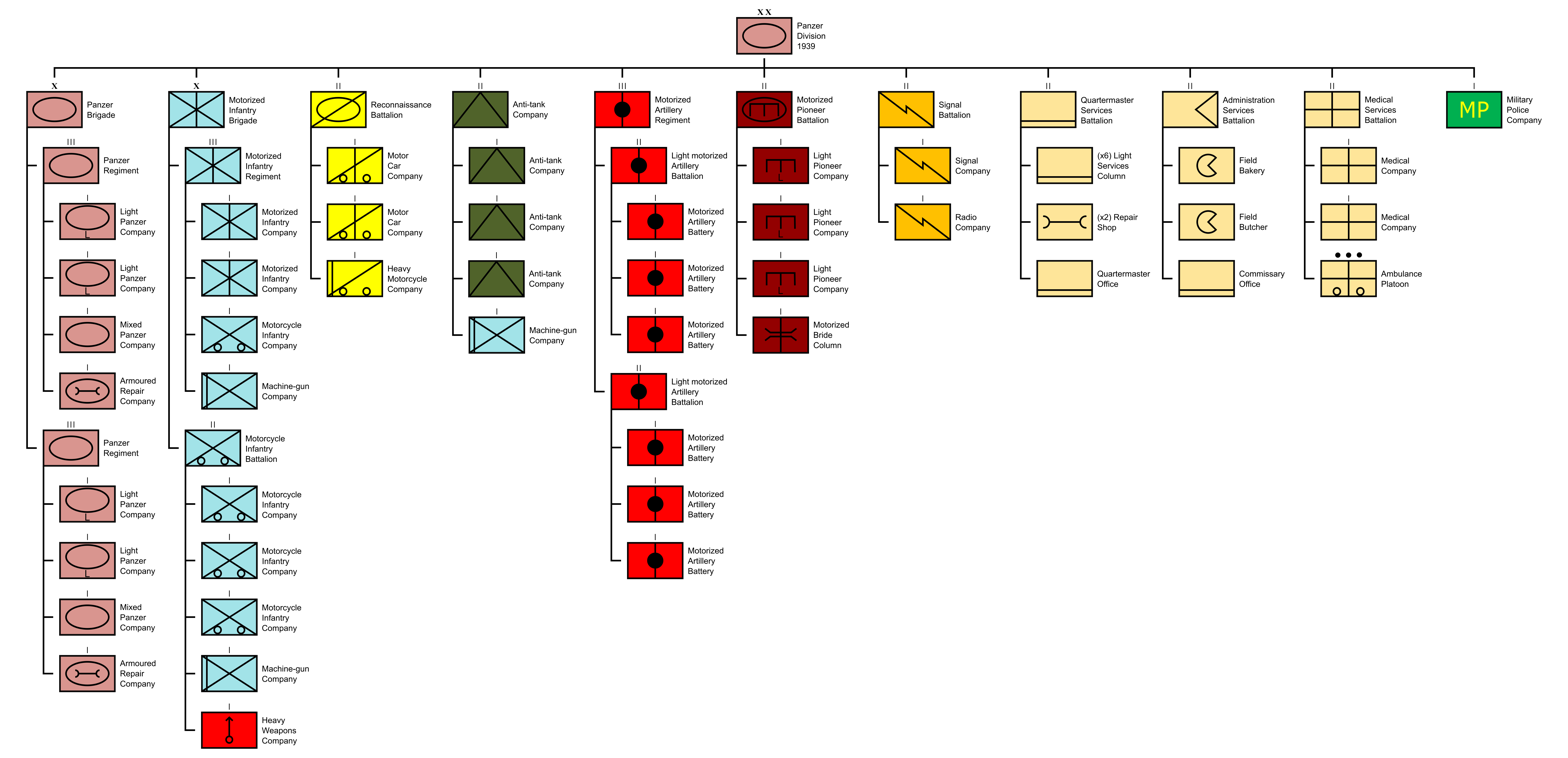
1939 planned Panzer Division layout, Panzer Brigade on the far left.

In the initial formation and conception of the German Panzerwaffe, the Panzer Brigade played an administrative role in the concept of its respective superior unit, the Panzer Division. In the prewar discussions, advocates of the establishment of Panzer Division (such as Heinz Guderian) faced opposition by a set of officers (such as Ludwig Beck) that favored independent Panzer Brigades and opposed division-level armored units.

To each Panzer Division was assigned a Panzer Brigade, which in turn contained two Panzer Regiments (each with two Panzer Detachments, for a total of four detachments in the Panzer Brigade). Additionally, a 1939 Panzer Division was supposed to be equipped with a Rifle Brigade (see above), a motorcycle battalion, a reconnaissance detachment, an engineer battalion, a panzer signals detachment, and a divisional services unit.

Only the original three Panzer Divisions (1st, 2nd, 3rd) actually contained all necessary parts in September 1939 (and even they did not receive the complete number of vehicles planned), and the divergences between the different divisions only increased as the war progressed. For instance, the 6th, 7th, 8th, and 9th Panzer Divisions (formed from the four Light Divisions after the Invasion of Poland) did not contain Panzer Brigades at all, instead opting for a single Panzer Regiment with three instead of two Panzer Detachments.

The collapse of Army Group Centre in 1944 (Operation Bagration), soon followed by the collapse of Army Group South Ukraine (Second Jassy–Kishinev offensive), resulted in the emergency formation of several new Panzer Brigades, numbered 101 through 113.

List of Wehrmacht armored brigades
German name	Translated name	Notes
1. Panzer-Brigade	1st Armored Brigade	Deployment begun in secret in February 1935 by absorbing three former cavalry regiments. Assembled officially on 1 October 1935 during the formation process of 1st Panzer Division. Dissolved by decree on 1 November 1942.
2. Panzer-Brigade	2nd Armored Brigade	Assembled on 15 October 1935 in Vienna to provide staff support for Panzer Regiments 3 and 4 during the formation process of 2nd Panzer Division. Dissolved by decree on 1 November 1942.
3. Panzer-Brigade	3rd Armored Brigade	Assembled on 15 October 1935 in Berlin to provide staff support for Panzer Regiments 5 and 6 during the formation process of 3rd Panzer Division. Commanded for some time by Georg Kühn. Contained the Panzer Training Detachment (Panzer-Lehr-Abteilung) during the Invasion of Poland. Restructured on 15 January 1941 into the staff of the 5th Light Division (later: 21st Panzer Division). Commanded by Hans von Funck.
4. Panzer-Brigade	4th Armored Brigade	Assembled on 10 November 1938 in Stuttgart. Formed the staff of Panzer Division Kempf on 1 September 1939, the beginning of the Invasion of Poland. Panzer Division Kempf dissolved on 15 October 1939 and the staff was once again designated as 4. Panzer-Brigade, now part of 10th Panzer Division. Dissolved in winter 1941/42.
5. Panzer-Brigade	5th Armored Brigade	Assembled on 10 November 1938 in Bamberg to provide staff support for the Panzer Regiments 35 and 36 of 4th Panzer Division. Placed under command of 3rd Panzer Division on 27 January 1941. Dissolved on 21 February 1942.
6. Panzer-Brigade	6th Armored Brigade	Assembled on 10 November 1938 in Würzburg to provide staff support for the Panzer Regiments 11 and 25. Assigned to 2nd Light Division on 1 April 1939. Dissolved later in 1939.
8. Panzer-Brigade	8th Armored Brigade	Formed on 10 November 1938 in Sagan (Wehrkreis VIII) for the Panzer Regiments 15 and 31 of 5th Panzer Division. Staff became the staff of 100th Armored Brigade in 1942.
10. Panzer-Brigade	10th Armored Brigade	Formed on 27 June 1943 from the staff of Panzer Regiment 10 after previously having been listed in OKH reserves since 16 September 1942. Deployed to Reims in May 1945. Later becomes the staff of Panzer Division Döberitz.
18. Panzer-Brigade	18th Armored Brigade	Staff-only; staff formed on 15 February 1942 from the staff of Panzer Regiment 18. Subordinate to 18th Panzer Division. Dissolved on 4 January 1943.
21. Panzer-Brigade	21st Armored Brigade	Staff formed on 25 June 1943 near Orel on the Eastern Front from personnel of Panzer Regiment 21. Used in October 1943 to build the divisional staff of Panzer Division Norway.
100. Panzer-Brigade	100th Armored Brigade	Formed on 1 March 1941 from the staff of 8th Armored Brigade (see above), to be used in German-occupied France. Contained the Beute Panzer Regiments 201 and 202, as well as the Panzer Detachment 301. Staff used in 1943 to become the staff of the General of Panzer Troops under OB West. Became Panzer Group Command West in winter 1943/44.
101. Panzer-Brigade	101st Armored Brigade	Main article: 101st Panzer Brigade Formed twice, once in 1941 and once in 1944.: Formed on 5 July 1941 under 1st Army in German-occupied France from the coordination staff for salvage armored formations (Arbeitsstab für Aufstellung von Beute-Panzerverbänden). Initially deployed with Beute Panzer Regiments 203 and 204. Used on 21 September 1941 to become the staff of 23rd Panzer Division and subsequently dissolved.; Formed on 21 July 1944 in Wehrkreis I with Panzer Detachment 2104, Panzergrenadier Battalion 2104 and Brigade Units 2101. Used in October 1944 to reinforce the 20th Panzer Division, which had been largely destroyed during combat in Romania. Subsequently absorbed into Panzer Regiment 21 and, in the case of Pz.Gren.Btl. 2104, became a Jagdkommando under 20th Panzer Division.
102. Panzer-Brigade	102nd Armored Brigade	Main article: 102nd Panzer Brigade Formed on 20 July 1944 in Wehrkreis XI with Panzer Detachment 2102 (four companies, formed from Panzer Replacement Detachment 5) and Panzergrenadier Battalion 2102 (three companies). Placed under XXIII Army Corps in October 1944. Dissolved on 27 November 1944 and integrated into the 7th Panzer Division in Arys. Staff and Panzer Detachment sent to Neuruppin after transferring all tanks to Panzer Regiment 25.
103. Panzer-Brigade	103rd Armored Brigade	Formed on 26 July 1944 in Wehrkreis XIII from the remnants of 25th Panzer Division, which had been largely destroyed during heavy fighting in northern Ukraine. Staff elements were provided by Panzergrenadier Regiment 146. The brigade initially contained Panzer Detachment 1203 (four companies from Panzer Detachment Norway) and Panzergrenadier Battalion 2103 (three companies). Placed in the army reserves of 3rd Panzer Army, then 4th Army and 3rd Panzer Army again in 1944, then placed under LVII Corps (17th Army) in Silesia in early 1945.
104. Panzer-Brigade	104th Armored Brigade	Formed on 18 July 1944 in Wehrkreis XI with Panzer Detachment 2104 (four companies) and Panzergrenadier Battalion 2104 (three companies), as well as Brigade Units 2104. Placed under the Cavalry Corps in August 1944, under XX Corps in September 1944, and under XXIII Corps in October to November 1944. Dissolved on 6 November 1944 and integrated into 25th Panzer Division.
105. Panzer-Brigade	105th Armored Brigade	Formed on 28 July 1944 in Wehrkreis I at Mielau Training Area, partially drawn from the remnants of 18th Panzergrenadier Division, which had previously been destroyed near Bobruisk. Initially contained Panzer Detachment 2105 (four companies, drawn from Wehrkreis XIII), Panzergrenadier Battalion 2105 (5 companies, drawn from the remnants of 18th Panzergrenadier Division), as well as the Brigade Units 2105. Redeployed from Mielau to Belgium on 31 August 1944. Under command of LXXXI Corps in September 1944. Moved into position forward of the Meuse river between 1 and 5 September, then fought forward of the river on 6 and 7 September. Withdrew across the Meuse and fought between it and the Westwall ("Siegfried Line") between 8 and 12 September, then defended the Westwall itself between 13 and 15 September. Defended Westwall fortifications at Stolberg between 15 and 23 September. Dissolved near the Lower Rhine on 23 September 1944 and used to reinforce the 9th Panzer Division, which had suffered heavy casualties during Operation Overlord. The Panzer Detachment was later used to form part of Panzer Regiment 10 under 8th Panzer Division.
106. Panzer-Brigade "Feldherrnhalle"	106th Armored Brigade "Feldherrnhalle"	Formed on 28 July 1944 in Wehrkreis I at Mielau Training Area from the remnants of Panzer-Grenadier-Division Feldherrnhalle as well as Feldherrnhalle's replacement units. Initially contained Panzer Detachment 2106 (4 companies), Panzergrenadier Battalion 2106 (5 companies), and Brigade Units 2106. Deployed from Mielau into the Trier sector on 31 August 1944. Under XIII SS Corps in September 1944, LXXXV Corps in October 1944, LXIV Corps between November 1944 and January 1945, army reserves of 15th Army in February 1945, army reserves of 1st Parachute Army in March 1945, and LXXXI Corps (15th Army) in April 1945.
107. Panzer-Brigade	107th Armored Brigade	Main article: 25th Panzergrenadier Division (Wehrmacht) Formed on 28 July 1944 in Wehrkreis I at Mielau Training Area from the remnants of 25th Panzergrenadier Division. Initially equipped with Panzer Detachment 2107 (4 companies), Panzergrenadier Battalion 2107 (five companies), and Brigade Units 2107. Placed under LXXXVI Corps (under 1st Parachute Army and eventually 5th Panzer Army, both Army Group B) between September and November 1944. In mid-September, the brigade was sent to assist the German response against the Allied paradrops of Operation Market Garden, being the most important German panzer unit sent against American paratroopers. Dissolved on 7 November 1944 and used to strengthen the Kampfgruppe-strength 25th Panzergrenadier Division to full divisional strength. Staff and Panzergrenadier Battalion 2107 joined the Panzergrenadier Regiment 119; Panzer Detachment 2107 became Panzer Detachment 5.
108. Panzer-Brigade	108th Armored Brigade	Formed in July 1944 at Grafenwoehr Training Area. Parts of the personnel intended for the brigade staff were rerouted to SS Panzer Brigade Gross instead, then substituted by the staff of Panzer Regiment 39 instead. The brigade initially contained Panzer Detachment 2108 (four companies), Panzergrenadier Battalion 2108 (5 companies), and Brigade Units 2108. The 108th Panzer Brigade was ordered vom Grafenwoehr to Gerolstein on 16 September 1944. Under command of II Parachute Corps (1st Parachute Army) in September 1944 and under I SS Panzer Corps (7th Army) in October 1944 (both corps under Army Group B). Dissolved in November 1944.
109. Panzer-Brigade	109th Armored Brigade	Formed on 19 July 1944 (deployment completion: 25 September 1944) on Estergom Training Area in Hungary from remnants of 25th Panzer Division and elements of 233rd Reserve Division. Initially contained Panzer Detachment 2109 (4 companies, deployed in Wehrkreis XVII), Panzergrenadier Battalion 2109 (5 companies), and Brigade Units 2107. Dissolved in October 1944 and used for the formation of Panzer Division Feldherrnhalle.
110. Panzer-Brigade "Feldherrnhalle"	110th Armored Brigade "Feldherrnhalle"	Formed on 19 July 1944 (deployment completion: 25 September 1944) on Oerkeny Training Area in Hungary from personnel of Replacement Brigade Feldherrnhalle, as well as donations to the panzer detachment from Wehrkreis IV, V, VIII and XI. Initially contained Panzer Detachment 2110 (4 companies) and Panzergrenadier Battalion 2110 (5 companies). Dissolved in September 1944 and used to redeploy the 13th Panzer Division which had been destroyed in Romania (later became Panzer Division Feldherrnhalle 2).
111. Panzer-Brigade	111th Armored Brigade	Formed on 4 September 1944 as a valkyrie unit in Wehrkreis VI with Panzer Detachment 2111, Panzergrenadier Regiment 2111, and Brigade Units 2111. Strengthened by a Panther-equipped Panzer Detachment from 116th Panzer Division. Sent from Wehrkreis VI to Remiremont on 6 September 1944. Placed under command of XXXXVII Corps in September 1944. Decreed on 25 September 1944 to be dissolved and integrated into 15th Panzergrenadier Division, but instead integrated into 11th Panzer Division on 1 October 1944 (swapped with 113th Panzer Brigade (see below)). Panzergrenadier Regiment 2111 was later used in December 1944 to form part of Panzer Regiment 9 of 25th Panzer Division.
112. Panzer-Brigade	112th Armored Brigade	Formed on 4 September 1944 in Wehrkreis V; initially equipped with Panzer Detachment 2112, Panzergrenadier Regiment 2112 and Brigade Units 2112. Redeployed from Wehrkreis V to Epinal on 6 September 1944 and placed under command of XXXXVII Corps of 5th Panzer Army. Dissolved as per a decree of 23 September 1944 and integrated into 21st Panzer Division.
113. Panzer-Brigade	113th Armored Brigade	Main article: 113th Panzer Brigade Formed on 4 September 1944 as a valkyrie unit in Wehrkreis XII; initially equipped with Panzer Detachment 2113, Panzergrenadier Regiment 2113 and Brigade Units 2113. Strengthened by a Panther-equipped Panzer Detachment (I./130) of Panzer Lehr Division. Redeployed from Wehrkreis XII to Kolmar on 6 September and from there to Saarburg on 16 September. Decreed on 23 September to be dissolved and integrated into 11th Panzer Division. Used instead on 1 October 1944 to reinforce the 15th Panzergrenadier Division (swapped with 111th Panzer Brigade (see above)).
Panzer-Brigade 150	Armored Brigade 150	Main article: Panzer Brigade 150 Combined unit of the Wehrmacht and Waffen-SS; see SS panzer brigades
Panzer-Ausbildungs-Verband Ostsee	Panzer Training Unit Baltic Sea	Formed on 28 March 1945 as part of Aktion Leuthen and gathered in Prenzlau. Although the formation was not nominally called "brigade", it would have reached brigade strength if all of its assigned subordinate units (staff, two Panzer training detachments, two Panzergrenadier training regiments, four Panzergrenadier training battalions, two Panzer reconnaissance detachments, one Panzer engineer battalions and one Panzer signal training detachment, as well as several miscellaneous training units and military schools) had properly gathered in full strength. Several of the assigned subordinate formations never joined the unit, and the Panzer Training Unit Baltic Sea consequently never reached proper brigade-level strength. The formation was assigned to Army Group Vistula.
Panzer-Brigade Norwegen	Armored Brigade Norway	Formed on 13 July 1944 from the downgraded Panzer Division Norway (active October 1943 – July 1944). Equipped with Panzer Detachment Norway and Panzergrenadier Battalion Norway (previously Assault Battalion Norway). Placed under XXXVI Corps of 20th Mountain Army between January and April 1945.

=== Panzerjäger brigades ===
List of Wehrmacht Panzerjäger brigades
German name	Translated name	Notes
Heeres-Panzerjagd-Brigade 1	Army Anti-Tank Brigade 1	Received a military postal code in March 1945. Staff units placed under command of 4th Panzer Army. Staff-only unit.
Heeres-Panzerjagd-Brigade 2	Army Anti-Tank Brigade 2	First appears in German records in April 1945. Limited combat in Upper Silesia.
Panzerjagd-Brigade 104	Anti-Tank Brigade 104	Formed on 26 January 1945 near Berlin as brigade-level staff unit for 6th Anti-Tank Detachment and 1st Panzer Reconnaissance Detachment using elements of the staff of Panzer Detachment 2102. Contained Anti-Tank Detachments 1 through 6. Used on 15 February 1945 as staff for Kampfgruppe General Müntzel.
Panzerjagd-Brigade Feldherrnhalle	Anti-Tank Brigade Feldherrnhalle	Formed in April 1945 using personnel of Replacement Brigade Feldherrnhalle, intended to field three anti-tank units. Did not see action before the end of the war.
Panzerjagd-Brigade Freie Ukraine	Anti-Tank Brigade Free Ukraine	Appears in German records in April 1945, intended to field three subordinate anti-tank units. Unlikely to have seen action before the end of the war.
Panzerjagd-Brigade West	Anti-Tank Brigade West	Planned for deployment as per an April 1945 listing. Intended to be equipped four Anti-Tank regiments (Blücher I, Blücher II, Nürnberg, Stuttgart) with two battalions each, for a total of eight anti-tank battalions, each with three companies, each with 6 commands (16 men each). Likely never deployed in reality.
Panzerjäger-Brigade Oberschlesien	Anti-Tank Brigade Upper Silesia	First appears in German records in April 1945. Formed in Wehrkreis VIII with three subordinate anti-tank units.
Panzer-Nahkampf-Brigade Hitlerjugend	Armored Melee Brigade Hitlerjugend	Formed in March 1945 in Wehrkreis III. Deployed in April 1945 in the Nauen, Berlin, and Potsdam sectors.
Schnelle Brigade West	Fast Brigade West	Formed in summer 1943 in German-occupied France. Equipped with a Panzergrenadier Regiment (two battalions), a Sturmgeschütz detachment, two motorcycle companies, a pioneer company, a signals company, supply units, and a field replacement company. The brigade briefly carried the ordinal number 931, and the Panzergrenadier Regiment was numbered 433. Used on 15 July 1943 near Rennes to redeploy the 21st Panzer Division, which had been destroyed in the North African theater. Panzergrenadier Regiment 433 became Panzergrenadier Regiment 125. The two motorcycle companies combined into Panzer Reconnaissance Detachment 21, Artillery Regiment 931 became Panzer Artillery Regiment 155. Dissolved after redeployment of 21st Panzer Division.

=== Reconnaissance brigades ===
Wehrmacht reconnaissance forces were usually organized well below the brigade level, for instance in the form of Kradschützen Battalions or Panzer Reconnaissance Detachments. The sole exceptions were four formations that were largely based around the idea of bicycle infantry. Two such brigades, the Fast Brigades 20 and 30, were first deployed in the German occupation zones in Belgium and the Netherlands in May 1943.

List of Wehrmacht reconnaissance brigades
German name	Translated name	Notes
Radfahr-Aufklärungs-Brigade Norwegen	Bicycle Reconnaissance Brigade Norway	Formed in July 1944 from the Bicycle Reconnaissance Regiment Norway (which had been assembled in April 1944). Placed under command of 20th Mountain Army (initially under XIX Corps). Underwent a major restructuring in February 1945.
Radfahr-Jäger-Brigade 10	Bicycle Infantry Brigade 10	Formed in January 1945, staff taken from staff personnel of Panzergrenadier Brigade 18. Consisted of three battalions with five companies each. Attached to VI Corps in February and March 1945 and used in the Braunsberg area in East Prussia. Attached to 131st Infantry Division in March 1945. Under Army East Prussia in April 1945.
Schnelle Brigade 20	Fast Brigade 20	Formed from Reserve Bicycle Regiment 20 (Reserve-Radfahr-Regiment 20; formed 22 February 1943) in May 1943. Staff became Brigade Staff z.b.V. 20 after the bicycle detachments were reassigned to 245th Volksgrenadier Division and 246th Volksgrenadier Division.
Schnelle Brigade 30	Fast Brigade 30	Formed from Reserve Bicycle Regiment 30 (Reserve-Radfahr-Regiment 30; formed 22 February 1943) on 7 March 1943. Dissolved on 5 September 1944 after suffering severe casualties during Operation Overlord.

=== Cavalry brigades ===
List of Wehrmacht cavalry brigades
German name	Translated name	Notes
1. Kavallerie-Brigade	1st Cavalry Brigade	Formed on 1 October 1934 as 5th Horse Brigade (5. Reiterbrigade), initially disguised as Cavalry Command Insterburg. On 1 April 1936, it remained as the sole cavalry brigade of the Wehrmacht (the others were motorized and merged into the armored force) and was redesignated 1st Cavalry Brigade. It contained the Horse Regiments 1 and 2. Participated in the Invasion of Poland; fought against the Polish 7th Uhlans on 3 September, then assigned to 12th Infantry Division. Participated in the Battle of Krasnobród against the 25th Uhlans on 23 September 1939. The 1st Cavalry Brigade was upgraded on 25 October 1939 to become the 1st Cavalry Division (24 November 1941: 24th Panzer Division).
3. Kavallerie-Brigade	3rd Cavalry Brigade	Formed in March 1944 under command of Army Group Centre from the Reinforced Cavalry Regiment Centre (Verstärktes Kavallerie-Regiment Mitte). It initially consisted of 105th Cavalry Regiment, Light Artillery Detachment Cavalry Regiment Centre, Sturmgeschütz Detachment 177, Heavy Cavalry Detachment 3rd Cavalry Brigade, and Cossack Detachment 3rd Cavalry Brigade, but was restructured in September 1944. Afterwards, it consisted of two Horse Regiments (numbered 31 and 32), as well as Artillery Regiment 869 and Panzer Reconnaissance Detachment 69 as well as Cossack Detachment 69. On 10 June 1944, Sturmgeschütz Detachment 177 had itself been upgraded to brigade status. Became 3rd Cavalry Division in September 1944.
4. Kavallerie-Brigade	4th Cavalry Brigade	Formed on 29 May 1944 under command of Army Group Centre using personnel of Cavalry Regiments North and South. It consisted of two Horse Regiments (numbered 5 "Field Marshal Mackensen" and 41) as well as Artillery Regiment 870. Became 4th Cavalry Division in February 1945 and was taken prisoner by British forces in Mauterndorf in May.
I. Kosaken-Reiter-Brigade	1st Cossack Horse Brigade	Formed on 5 August 1943. Redesignated "Cossack Brigade (Don)" (Kosaken-Brigade (Don)) on 11 January 1944. Placed under command of the Waffen-SS in December 1944 as part of the 1st Cossack Division.
II. Kosaken-Reiter-Brigade	2nd Cossack Horse Brigade	Formed on 5 August 1943. Redesignated "Cossack Brigade (Caucasus)" (Kosaken-Brigade (Kaukasus)) on 15 January 1944. Placed under command of the Waffen-SS in December 1944 as part of the 2nd Cossack Division.
Reiter-Brigade 1	Horse Brigade 1	Formed on 1 March 1940 as "Horse Brigade" (Reiterbrigade, without an ordinal number), as a redesignation of the previous Horse Brigade 2 (see below). Placed under command of 1st Cavalry Division. Repurposed into a brief period of organizational autonomy as "Mixed Mobile Brigade Senger" (Gemischte schnelle Brigade Senger), returned on 5 August 1940 to 1st Cavalry Division. Redesignated "Horse Brigade 1" on 2 April 1941. Transformed on 2 December 1941 into Rifle Brigade 24 upon the 1st Cavalry Division's transformation into 24th Panzer Division.
Reiter-Brigade 2	Horse Brigade 2	Formed on 7 December 1939 in Torgau, became "Horse Brigade" on 1 March 1940 (see above).

=== Army artillery brigades ===
List of Wehrmacht army artillery brigades
German name	Translated name	Notes
Heeres-Artillerie-Brigade 70	Army Artillery Brigade 70	Staff formed on 18 June 1944 from the regiment staff of Artillery Regiment 70.
Heeres-Artillerie-Brigade 88	Army Artillery Brigade 88	Formed on 25 July 1944 from Mot. Artillery Regiment 88 after the dissolution of 18th Artillery Division through the addition of Artillery Detachment 854. Deployed to the Eastern Front and fought in Central Russia, Northern Ukraine and ultimately East Prussia.
Heeres-Artillerie-Brigade 140	Army Artillery Brigade 140	Staff formed from Artillery Regiment Staff z.b.V. (mot.) 140 on 28 February 1943 with 6th Army in the immediate aftermath of the Battle of Stalingrad.
Heeres-Artillerie-Brigade 288	Army Artillery Brigade 288	Formed in July 1944 from Artillery Regiment 288. Under 4th Panzer Army and near Krakow towards the end of the war.
Heeres-Artillerie-Brigade 388	Army Artillery Brigade 388	Formed on 18 September 1944 from Artillery Regiment 388. Redesignated Volks-Artillerie-Korps 388 on 30 October 1944.
Heeres-Artillerie-Brigade 401	Army Artillery Brigade 401	Formed in September 1944 with five detachment in Wehrkreis XIII. Deployed from the Protectorate of Bohemia and Moravia to the Western Front on 4 November 1944. Redesignated Volks-Artillerie-Korps 401 in November 1944.
Heeres-Artillerie-Brigade 402	Army Artillery Brigade 402	Formed on 18 September 1944 in Wehrkreis IX with 5 detachments. Redesignated Volks-Artillerie-Korps 402 in November 1944.
Heeres-Artillerie-Brigade 403	Army Artillery Brigade 403	Formed on 15 October 1944 in Wehrkreis XI with 6 detachments. Redesignated Volks-Artillerie-Korps 403 in November 1944.
Heeres-Artillerie-Brigade 404	Army Artillery Brigade 404	Formed on 15 October 1944 in Wehrkreis X with 6 detachments. Redesignated Volks-Artillerie-Korps 404 in November 1944.
Heeres-Artillerie-Brigade 405	Army Artillery Brigade 405	Formed on 15 October 1944 in Wehrkreis II, with 5 detachments, in the Rügenwalde area. Redesignated Volks-Artillerie-Korps 405 in November 1944.
Heeres-Artillerie-Brigade 406	Army Artillery Brigade 406	Formed on 15 October 1944 in Wehrkreis III, with 5 detachments, in the Jüterbog area. Redesignated Volks-Artillerie-Korps 406 in November 1944.
Heeres-Artillerie-Brigade 407	Army Artillery Brigade 407	Formed on 15 October 1944 in Wehrkreis IV, with 5 detachments, in the Meissen area. Redesignated Volks-Artillerie-Korps 407 in November 1944.
Heeres-Artillerie-Brigade 408	Army Artillery Brigade 408	Formed on 15 October 1944 in Wehrkreis XVII, with 5 detachments, in the Bruck an der Leitha area. Redesignated Volks-Artillerie-Korps 408 in November 1944.
Heeres-Artillerie-Brigade 409	Army Artillery Brigade 409	Formed on 15 October 1944 in Wehrkreis VII in the Augsburg area. Redesignated Volks-Artillerie-Korps 409 in November 1944.
Heeres-Artillerie-Brigade 410	Army Artillery Brigade 410	Formed on 21 October 1944 in the Wuppertal area. Redesignated Volks-Artillerie-Korps 410 on 28 November 1944.
Leichte Heeres-Artillerie-Brigade 704	Light Army Artillery Brigade 704	Formed on 11 June 1944 (with Artillery Detachments 131, 861, 934) from the Artillery Regiment Staff z.b.V. 704. Sent to Normandy to oppose Operation Overlord, then sent to the Eastern Front. Placed under command of 2nd Army in winter 1944/45.
Heeres-Artillerie-Brigade 732	Army Artillery Brigade 732	Formed in January 1945 from the staff of Army Artillery Brigade 140 (see above) as well as elements of Artillery Regiment 36 and Heavy Artillery Detachment 154. Later traded one of its detachments (I./732) with Army Artillery Detachment 777 (see below), receiving III./777 in return. Placed under command of 9th Army on the Vistula and later Oder fronts.
Heeres-Artillerie-Brigade 766	Army Artillery Brigade 766	Formed on 25 July 1944 near Schwerin (Wehrkreis II) with three detachments under the staff of Artillery Regiment 766. Later joined by a fourth detachment formed from Artillery Regiment 68 (which had been redeployed after its previous destruction near Vitebsk). Became Volks-Artillerie-Korps 766 in September 1944.
Heeres-Artillerie-Brigade 777	Army Artillery Brigade 777	Formed in October 1944 in Wehrkreis XII, received a battery from Heavy Artillery Detachment 731 on 24 October 1944. Later, it traded a detachment (III./777) with Army Artillery Brigade 732, receiving the I./732 in return. Placed under 4th Panzer Army at the Vistula and later in Lusatia.
Heeres-Artillerie-Brigade 959	Army Artillery Brigade 959	Formed on 25 June 1944 from the Artillery Regiment Staff z.b.V. 959. Placed under command of 8th Army and fought in Slovakia.

=== Sturmgeschütz brigades ===
The army had fielded dedicated Sturmgeschütz units starting with the Sturmgeschütz Detachments that were first deployed on 7 February 1941. In February 1944, those Sturmgeschütz Detachments with three batteries received the designation of Sturmgeschütz Brigades. Some of those brigades (those that were additionally equipped with an escort company) were later again redesignated to become Army Assault Artillery Brigades (see below).

A Sturmgeschütz brigade contained (at least) three batteries, each typically with 10 to 14 assault guns.

List of Wehrmacht Sturmgeschütz brigades
German name	Translated name	Notes
Sturmgeschütz-Brigade 177	Sturmgeschütz Brigade 177	Formed on 17 February 1944 from Sturmgeschütz Detachment 177. Used on 9 August 1944 to form Anti-Tank Detachment 69 under 3rd Cavalry Brigade.
Sturmgeschütz-Brigade 184	Sturmgeschütz Brigade 184	Formed on 14 February 1944 from Sturmgeschütz Detachment 184. Became Army Assault Brigade 184 on 10 June 1944.
Sturmgeschütz-Brigade 185	Sturmgeschütz Brigade 185	Formed on 14 February 1944 from Sturmgeschütz Detachment 185. Redesignated Heeres-Sturmgeschütz-Brigade 185 on 10 July 1944. Destroyed in Russia in 1944.
Sturmgeschütz-Brigade 189	Sturmgeschütz Brigade 189	Formed on 10 June 1944 from Sturmgeschütz Detachment 189. Assigned to 78th Assault Division. Redesignated "Anti-Tank Detachment North" (Panzerjagd-Abteilung Nord) later in June 1944.
Leichte Sturmgeschütz-Brigade 190	Light Sturmgeschütz Brigade 190	Formed on 14 January 1944 from Light Sturmgeschütz Detachment 190. Assigned to the 4th Army in the Mogilev sector. Close to Danzig at the end of the war.
Sturmgeschütz-Brigade 191	Sturmgeschütz Brigade 191	Formed on 28 February 1944 from Sturmgeschütz Detachment 191. Strengthened on 29 July 1944 by the addition of forces from the Army Assault Artillery Brigade 201 to a total of four batteries.
Sturmgeschütz-Brigade 201	Sturmgeschütz Brigade 201	Formed on 14 February 1944 from Sturmgeschütz Detachment 201. Integrated into other forces in 1945.
Sturmgeschütz-Brigade 202	Sturmgeschütz Brigade 202	Formed on 14 February 1944 from Sturmgeschütz Detachment 202. Became Army Artillery Assault Brigade 202.
Sturmgeschütz-Brigade 203	Sturmgeschütz Brigade 203	Formed on 14 February 1944 from Sturmgeschütz Detachment 203. Spent the end of the war under command of 1st Panzer Army in Silesia.
Sturmgeschütz-Brigade 209	Sturmgeschütz Brigade 209	Formed on 14 February 1944 from Sturmgeschütz Detachment 209.
Sturmgeschütz-Brigade 210	Sturmgeschütz Brigade 210	Formed on 14 February 1944 from Sturmgeschütz Detachment 210. Deleted from German military postal records in April 1945. Under command of the 1st Hungarian Army in northern Ukraine in 1944 and under 4th Panzer Army on the Vistula front towards the end of the war in 1945.
Sturmgeschütz-Brigade 226	Sturmgeschütz Brigade 226	Formed on 14 February 1944 from Sturmgeschütz Detachment 226. Became Army Assault Artillery Brigade 226.
Sturmgeschütz-Brigade 228	Sturmgeschütz Brigade 228	Formed on 14 February 1944 from Sturmgeschütz Detachment 228. Suffered large casualties in the Second Jassy–Kishinev offensive in August 1944. Spent the end of the war with 8th Army.
Sturmgeschütz-Brigade 232	Sturmgeschütz Brigade 232	Formed on 14 February 1944 from Sturmgeschütz Detachment 232. Placed under command of 3rd Panzer Army in East Prussia, then under 17th Army in Silesia.
Sturmgeschütz-Brigade 236	Sturmgeschütz Brigade 236	Formed on 14 February 1944 from Sturmgeschütz Detachment 236. Became Army Assault Artillery Brigade on 10 June 1944.
Sturmgeschütz-Brigade 237	Sturmgeschütz Brigade 237	Formed on 14 February 1944 from Sturmgeschütz Detachment 237. Was split into the newly-found Assault Panzer Detachments 218 and 219 in September 1944.
Sturmgeschütz-Brigade 239	Sturmgeschütz Brigade 239	Formed on 14 February 1944 from Sturmgeschütz Detachment 239. Became Army Assault Artillery Brigade 239 on 10 June 1944.
Sturmgeschütz-Brigade 243	Sturmgeschütz Brigade 243	Formed on 14 February 1944 from Sturmgeschütz Detachment 243. Became Army Assault Artillery Brigade 243 in winter 1944/45.
Sturmgeschütz-Brigade 244	Sturmgeschütz Brigade 244	Formed on 14 February 1944 from Sturmgeschütz Detachment 244. Joined the 9th Army at Babruysk in June 1944. After receiving reinforcements, redeployed from Altengrabow Training Area to Breda in the German-occupied Netherlands. Sent to Gerolstein on 10 December 1944. Participated in the Ardennes Offensive with 5th Panzer Army. Final assignment was to 15th Army in the Cologne area.
Sturmgeschütz-Brigade 245	Sturmgeschütz Brigade 245	Formed on 14 February 1944 from Sturmgeschütz Detachment 245. Destroyed in June 1944 at Vitebsk.
Sturmgeschütz-Brigade 249	Sturmgeschütz Brigade 249	Formed on 14 February 1944 from Sturmgeschütz Detachment 249. Under command of 4th Panzer Army in northern Ukraine in June 1944. Became Army Assault Artillery Brigade 249 in 1945.
Sturmgeschütz-Brigade 259	Sturmgeschütz Brigade 259	Formed on 14 February 1944 from Sturmgeschütz Detachment 259. Under command of the 6th Army (Army Group South Ukraine) in June 1944. Under command of the 4th Army in East Prussia towards the end of the war.
Sturmgeschütz-Brigade 261	Sturmgeschütz Brigade 261	Formed on 14 February 1944 from Sturmgeschütz Detachment 261. Became Army Assault Artillery Brigade 261 in winter 1944/45.
Sturmgeschütz-Brigade 270	Sturmgeschütz Brigade 270	Formed on 14 February 1944 from Sturmgeschütz Detachment 270. Became Anti-Tank Detachment 152 under 1st Ski Division on 9 August 1944.
Sturmgeschütz-Brigade 276	Sturmgeschütz Brigade 276	Formed on 14 February 1944 from Sturmgeschütz Detachment 276. Reinforced in Wehrkreis XX on 21 June 1944. Deployed near Danzig under 2nd Army towards the end of the war.
Sturmgeschütz-Brigade 277	Sturmgeschütz Brigade 277	Formed on 14 February 1944 from Sturmgeschütz Detachment 277. Became Army Assault Artillery Brigade 277 in winter 1944/45.
Sturmgeschütz-Brigade 278	Sturmgeschütz Brigade 278	Formed on 14 February 1944 from Sturmgeschütz Detachment 278. Ordered on 15 November 1944 to be redeployed to the Western Front, but incapable of fulfilling the order due to high casualties taken in the Memelland. No deployments listed in the German records in 1945.
Sturmgeschütz-Brigade 279	Sturmgeschütz Brigade 279	Formed on 14 February 1944 from Sturmgeschütz Detachment 279. Reinforced on 21 June 1944. Under command of 4th Army in East Prussia towards the end of the war.
Sturmgeschütz-Brigade 280	Sturmgeschütz Brigade 280	Formed on 14 February 1944 from Sturmgeschütz Detachment 280. Reinforced in German-occupied Denmark in September 1944; subsequently deployed to the German-occupied Netherlands and placed under command of 15th Army. Sent to Colmar on 20 November 1944. Subordinate to 1st Army in the Saarpfalz region towards the end of the war.
Sturmgeschütz-Brigade 281	Sturmgeschütz Brigade 281	Formed on 14 February 1944 from Sturmgeschütz Detachment 281. Mostly annihilated at Vitebsk in September 1944; remnants used for the assembly of Artillery Anti-Tank Detachment 1052.
Sturmgeschütz-Brigade 286	Sturmgeschütz Brigade 286	Formed on 14 February 1944 from Sturmgeschütz Detachment 286. Deployed to Army Group South Ukraine in summer 1944, saw action near Chișinău in June. Recalled to Germany for reinforcement, then redeployed to the front in Slovakia in 1945 under command of 8th Army.
Sturmgeschütz-Brigade 300	Sturmgeschütz Brigade 300	Formed on 14 February 1944 from Sturmgeschütz Detachment 300. Under command of 1st Panzer Army (Army Group North Ukraine) in June 1944. Deployed to the 17th Army towards the end of the war. Became Army Assault Artillery Brigade 300 in April 1945.
Sturmgeschütz-Brigade 301	Sturmgeschütz Brigade 301	Formed on 14 February 1944 from Sturmgeschütz Detachment 301. Sent to the Eastern Front in February/March 1944. Placed under command of 1st Panzer Army (Army Group North Ukraine) in June 1944; positioned near Brody. Still under command of 1st Panzer Army towards the end of the war (fighting in Upper Silesia and Moravia).
Sturmgeschütz-Brigade 303	Sturmgeschütz Brigade 303	Formed on 14 February 1944 from Sturmgeschütz Detachment 303. Sent in mid-1944 to assist Finnish forces in the Vyborg sector along with the German 122nd Infantry Division to assist Finland against the Soviet Union; later recalled to the German lines. Became Army Assault Artillery Brigade 303 in autumn 1944.
Sturmgeschütz-Brigade 311	Sturmgeschütz Brigade 311	Formed on 14 February 1944 from Sturmgeschütz Detachment 311. Equipped with StuGs at Altengrabow Training Area in March 1944. Under command of 1st Panzer Army (Army Group North Ukraine) and deployed near Brody in June 1944. Subordinate to 17th Army in Silesia towards the end of the war.
Sturmgeschütz-Brigade 322	Sturmgeschütz Brigade 322	Formed on 14 February 1944 from Sturmgeschütz Detachment 322. Dissolved in winter 1944/45 and joined into the 210th. Belatedly removed from German military postal records in April 1945.
Sturmgeschütz-Brigade 325	Sturmgeschütz Brigade 325	Formed on 14 February 1944 from Sturmgeschütz Detachment 325. Sent to Altengrabow Training Area in March 1944 to be equipped with StuGs. Subordinate to 4th Romanian Corps under 8th Army in southern Ukraine in June 1944. Still under 8th Army (in Slovakia) towards the end of the war.
Sturmgeschütz-Brigade 341	Sturmgeschütz Brigade 341	Main article: Sturmgeschütz Brigade 341 Formed on 14 February 1944 from Sturmgeschütz Detachment 341. Sent from Toulouse to Rennes on 25 July 1944 to plug the breakout of the US third Army at Avaranches, fighting in Pontorson, Saint Malo/Dinard area, the final vehicles were destroyed at Mayenne during the capture of the important crossing of the Mayenne river on the 5th of August. The majority of the brigade were lost in the fighting retreat east to Chartes. Participated in the Ardennes Offensive in December 1944 as part of 15th Army. Still part of 15th Army (now in the Cologne region) towards the end of the war.
Sturmgeschütz-Brigade 393	Sturmgeschütz Brigade 393	Formed on 10 March 1944 in Schweinfurt (Wehrkreis XIII) with three batteries. Became Army Assault Artillery Brigade 393 in winter 1944/45.
Sturmgeschütz-Brigade 394	Sturmgeschütz Brigade 394	Formed on 10 June 1944 from Sturmgeschütz Detachment 394. Assigned initially to 18th Artillery Division; subsequently part of 6th Panzer Army during the Battle of the Bulge and under command of 1st Parachute Army in 1945; deployed to Wesel towards the end of the war.
Sturmgeschütz-Brigade 395	Sturmgeschütz Brigade 395	Formed on 1 May 1944 (as ordered in a decree dated 6 March 1944) in Neiße (Wehrkreis VIII) with three batteries. Dissolved on 17 July 1944 and used to form the Sturmgeschütz Detachments 1550–1553, 1558, and 1559. Deleted from German military postal records in August 1944.
Sturmgeschütz-Brigade 396	Sturmgeschütz Brigade 396	Formed on 22 March 1944 in German-occupied Denmark with three batteries. Dissolved on 17 July 1944 and used to form the Sturmgeschütz Detachments 1550–1553, 1558, and 1559.
Sturmgeschütz-Brigade 397	Sturmgeschütz Brigade 397	Intended for deployment in March 1944 in Posen (Wehrkreis XXI). Deployment never completed.
Sturmgeschütz-Brigade 398	Sturmgeschütz Brigade 398	Intended for deployment in May 1944 in Posen (Wehrkreis XXI). Deployment never completed.
Sturmgeschütz-Brigade 600	Sturmgeschütz Brigade 600	Formed on 14 February 1944 from Sturmgeschütz Detachment 600. Became Army Assault Artillery Brigade in autumn 1944.
Sturmgeschütz-Brigade 667	Sturmgeschütz Brigade 667	Formed on 14 February 1944 from Sturmgeschütz Detachment 667. Became Assault Artillery Brigade 667 on 10 June 1944.
Sturmgeschütz-Brigade 720	Sturmgeschütz Brigade 720	Intended designation for Sturmgeschütz Detachment 914, to be assigned on 14 February 1944. Designation never used; Sturmgeschütz Detachment 914 instead became Sturmgeschütz Brigade 914 (see below). Sturmgeschütz Brigade 720 never existed.
Sturmgeschütz-Brigade 901	Sturmgeschütz Brigade 901	Listed in German records in 1945. Unlikely to actually have been deployed in reality.
Sturmgeschütz-Brigade 902	Sturmgeschütz Brigade 902	Formed on 14 February 1944 from the Tours Sturmgeschutz training school France, Sturmgeschütz Brigade 902 officers and Ncos were drawn from Panzer Lehr ausbildung and sturmgeschutz brigade 247 members. Moved to the Normandy front on the 12th and attached to 91st Luftlande Division on the 19th of June. One company was attached to 247 Infantry Division and was trapped in Cherbourg after the Normandy landings. The remaining two companies fought with the 91st Luftlande Division in the lower Cotentin peninsula, were almost totally destroyed during operation Cobra, retreated through the Falaise gap. Subsequently redeployed to Holland for refit, then Germany; participated in the Battle of the Bulge as part of 15th Army. Part of 5th Panzer Army in the Lower Rhine region towards the end of the war.
Sturmgeschütz-Brigade 904	Sturmgeschütz Brigade 904	Formed on 14 February 1944 from Sturmgeschütz Detachment 904. Deployed near Brest-Litovsk under command of 2nd Army in June 1944; subsequently withdrawn westwards to East Prussia. No record of combat in 1945.
Sturmgeschütz-Brigade 905	Sturmgeschütz Brigade 905	Formed on 14 February 1944 from Sturmgeschütz Detachment 905. Became Army Assault Artillery Brigade 905 in autumn 1944.
Sturmgeschütz-Brigade 907	Sturmgeschütz Brigade 907	Formed on 14 February 1944 from Sturmgeschütz Detachment 907. Under 10th Army in 1944 and under 14th Army in 1945.
Sturmgeschütz-Brigade 909	Sturmgeschütz Brigade 909	Formed on 14 February 1944 from Sturmgeschütz Detachment 909. Initially equipped with three batteries, but received a fourth battery on 30 July 1944. Deployed to 16th Army in June 1944 in the Polotsk region, subsequently withdrawn westwards to East Prussia. No record of military engagements in 1945.
Sturmgeschütz-Brigade 911	Sturmgeschütz Brigade 911	Formed on 14 February 1944 from Sturmgeschütz Detachment 911. Deployed to 6th Army in the Chisinau area in June 1944. Temporarily withdrawn to receive reinforcements on 10 December 1944. Became Army Assault Artillery Brigade 911 in winter 1944/45.
Sturmgeschütz-Brigade 912	Sturmgeschütz Brigade 912	Formed on 14 February 1944 from Sturmgeschütz Detachment 912. Part of 16th Army and deployed to Daugavpils in June 1944. Became Army Assault Artillery Brigade 912 in winter 1944/45.
Sturmgeschütz-Brigade 914	Sturmgeschütz Brigade 914	Formed in September 1944 from Sturmgeschütz Detachment 914. Subordinate to 14th Army in 1945.
Sturmgeschütz-Lehr-Brigade 920	Sturmgeschütz Training Brigade 920	Formed in September 1944 with a strength of four batteries. Fourth battery eventually reassigned to Sturmgeschütz Brigade 209. Temporarily redesignated "Tank Annihilation Detachment 303" (Panzer-Vernichtungs-Abteilung 303) in February 1945, then reassigned its original designation.

=== Army assault artillery brigades ===
List of Wehrmacht army assault artillery brigades
German name	Translated name	Notes
Heeres-Sturmartillerie-Brigade 184	Army Assault Artillery Brigade 184	Redesignation of Sturmgeschütz Brigade 184 on 10 June 1944. Sent to the Eastern Front and placed under command of 16th Army. Eventually reassigned to 18th Army at Pskov and ultimately to Army Group Vistula.
Heeres-Sturmartillerie-Brigade 202	Army Assault Artillery Brigade 202	Formed from Sturmgeschütz Brigade 202 after February 1944.
Heeres-Sturmartillerie-Brigade 226	Army Assault Artillery Brigade 226	Formed from Sturmgeschütz Brigade 226 after February 1944.
Heeres-Sturmartillerie-Brigade 236	Army Assault Artillery Brigade 236	Redesignation of Sturmgeschütz Brigade 236 on 10 June 1944. Deployed on the Eastern Front, placed under command of the 4th Panzer Army towards the end of the war in 1945.
Heeres-Sturmartillerie-Brigade 239	Army Assault Artillery Brigade 239	Formed from Sturmgeschütz Brigade 239 on 10 June 1944.
Heeres-Sturmartillerie-Brigade 243	Army Assault Artillery Brigade 243	Formed from Sturmgeschütz Brigade 243 on 10 June 1944. Strengthened through the addition of a fourth battery.
Heeres-Sturmartillerie-Brigade 249	Army Assault Artillery Brigade 249	Formed from Sturmgeschütz Brigade 249 in 1945.
Heeres-Sturmartillerie-Brigade 261	Army Assault Artillery Brigade 261	Formed from Sturmgeschütz Brigade 261 in winter 1944/45. Strengthened by the addition of a fourth battery. Deployed in Hungary towards the end of the war.
Heeres-Sturmartillerie-Brigade 277	Army Assault Artillery Brigade 277	Formed from Sturmgeschütz Brigade 277 in winter 1944/45. Deployed to Burg bei Magdeburg for restructuring towards the end of the war.
Heeres-Sturmartillerie-Brigade 300	Army Assault Artillery Brigade 300	Formed from Sturmgeschütz Brigade 300 in April 1945. Under command of 17th Army in Silesia.
Heeres-Sturmartillerie-Brigade 303	Army Assault Artillery Brigade 303	Formed from Sturmgeschütz Brigade 303 in autumn 1944. Equipped with four batteries. Subordinate to 6th Army in Hungary towards the end of the war.
Heeres-Sturmartillerie-Brigade 393	Army Assault Artillery Brigade 393	Formed from Sturmgeschütz Brigade 393 in winter 1944/45. Subordinate to 16th Army in the Courland pocket.
Heeres-Sturmartillerie-Brigade 600	Army Assault Artillery Brigade 600	Formed from Sturmgeschütz Brigade 600 in autumn 1944. Subordinate to 18th Army and eventually trapped in the Courland pocket.
Sturmartillerie-Brigade 667	Assault Artillery Brigade 667	Formed from Sturmgeschütz Brigade 667 on 10 June 1944. Participated in the Battle of the Bulge as part of 6th Panzer Army. Eventually part of the 1st Army in the Landau region towards the end of the war.
Heeres-Sturmartillerie-Brigade 905	Army Assault Artillery Brigade 905	Formed from Sturmgeschütz Brigade 905 in autumn 1944. Reinforced in 1945 and deployed to 5th Panzer Army in the Eifel region.
Heeres-Sturmartillerie-Brigade 911	Army Assault Artillery Brigade 911	Formed from Sturmgeschütz Brigade 911 in winter 1944/45. Integrated into the Führer Grenadier Division on 26 January 1945, (with a final strength of three companies of ten StuGs each).
Heeres-Sturmartillerie-Brigade 912	Army Assault Artillery Brigade 912	Formed from Sturmgeschütz Brigade 912 in winter 1944/45. Part of the 18th Army (trapped in the Courland Pocket) in 1945.
Heeres-Sturmartillerie-Brigade 1178	Army Assault Artillery Brigade 1178	Staff only; deployment began in April 1945; still in assembly at the Replacement Army when the war ended; never deployed.

=== Army anti-aircraft artillery brigades ===
The army flak artillery (Heeresflakartillerie) had become its own branch of the Wehrmacht artillery on 15 June 1941, after first army flak artillery detachments had started to see deployment in February 1941. In January 1945, ten army flak artillery brigades, numbered 501 through 510, were established. Each of them consisted of two battalions (or a total of ten companies), and several of them incorporated preexisting formations, the Infantry Flak Battalions.

List of Wehrmacht army anti-aircraft artillery brigades
German name	Translated name	Notes
Heeres-Flakartillerie-Brigade 501	Army Flak Artillery Brigade 501	Formed on 15 January 1945 from Infantry Flak Battalions 821 and 824. Sent to the Western Front; active in the Eifel region.
Heeres-Flakartillerie-Brigade 502	Army Flak Artillery Brigade 502	Formed on 15 January 1945 from Infantry Flak Battalions 822 and 823. Placed under command of 7th Army on the Western Front; active in the Eifel region.
Heeres-Flakartillerie-Brigade 503	Army Flak Artillery Brigade 503	Formed on 15 January 1945 from Infantry Flak Battalions 825 and 826. Sent to the Western Front; active in the Eifel region.
Heeres-Flakartillerie-Brigade 504	Army Flak Artillery Brigade 504	Formed on 15 January 1945 from Infantry Flak Battalions 832 and 833. Deployment never fully completed; staff personnel last deployed to Göttingen. Some elements in combat near Cottbus.
Heeres-Flakartillerie-Brigade 505	Army Flak Artillery Brigade 505	Formed on 15 January 1945 from Infantry Flak Battalion 834 as well as an unknown battalion. Never saw action. Staff in Gotha and combat elements in Würzburg at the end of the war.
Heeres-Flakartillerie-Brigade 506	Army Flak Artillery Brigade 506	Formed on 15 January 1945 from Infantry Flak Battalions 835 and 836. Never saw action. Staff and some elements in Denmark, other elements under 1st Parachute Army at the end of the war.
Heeres-Flakartillerie-Brigade 507	Army Flak Artillery Brigade 507	Formed on 15 January 1945 in Wehrkreis II. Never saw action.
Heeres-Flakartillerie-Brigade 508	Army Flak Artillery Brigade 508	Formed on 15 January 1945 in Jüterbog (Wehrkreis III). Still in deployment at the end of the war; tentatively assigned to 7th Army.
Heeres-Flakartillerie-Brigade 509	Army Flak Artillery Brigade 509	Formed on 15 January 1945 in Wehrkreis X. Never saw action.
Heeres-Flakartillerie-Brigade 510	Army Flak Artillery Brigade 510	Formed on 15 January 1945 in Ried (Wehrkreis XVII). Never saw action.

=== Rocket launcher brigades ===
List of Wehrmacht rocket launcher brigades
German name	Translated name	Notes
Stellungs-Werfer-Brigade 300	Emplacement Launcher Brigade 300	Formed in August 1944 with two Emplacement Launcher Regiments (numbered 102 and 103). Dissolved in January 1943 and remnants integrated into People's Launcher Brigade 3.
Volks-Werfer-Brigade 1	People's Launcher Brigade 1	November 1944 redesignation of Launcher Brigade 1 (Werfer-Brigade 1).
Volks-Werfer-Brigade 2	People's Launcher Brigade 2	November 1944 redesignation of Launcher Brigade 2 (Werfer-Brigade 2).
Volks-Werfer-Brigade 3	People's Launcher Brigade 3	November 1944 redesignation of Launcher Brigade 3 (Werfer-Brigade 3).
Volks-Werfer-Brigade 4	People's Launcher Brigade 4	November 1944 redesignation of Launcher Brigade 4 (Werfer-Brigade 4).
Volks-Werfer-Brigade 7	People's Launcher Brigade 7	Redesignation of the reassembled Launcher Brigade 7 (Werfer-Brigade 7) which had been destroyed during Operation Overlord. Participated in the Battle of the Bulge under 5th Panzer Army.
Volks-Werfer-Brigade 8	People's Launcher Brigade 8	28 October 1944 redesignation of Launcher Brigade 8, which had been destroyed during Operation Overlord. Participated in the Battle of the Bulge as part of 7th Army. Withdrawn to the Eifel region (still under command of 7th Army) towards the end of the war.
Volks-Werfer-Brigade 9	People's Launcher Brigade 9	November 1944 redesignation of Launcher Brigade 9, which had been destroyed during Operation Overlord. Participated in the Battle of the Bulge as part of 6th Panzer Army. Withdrawn to the Eifel region in Germany and placed under command of 7th Army towards the end of the war.
Volks-Werfer-Brigade 15	People's Launcher Brigade 15	Formed on 25 September 1944 in Celle. Deployed to the Western Front on 27 October 1944 with Launcher Regiments 55 and 85. Participated in the Battle of the Bulge under 5th Panzer Army. Subordinate to the 15th Army towards the end of the war.
Volks-Werfer-Brigade 16	People's Launcher Brigade 16	Formed on 6 October 1944 in Bremen (Wehrkreis X). Sent from Hildesheim to the Western Front on 27 November 1944 with Launcher Regiments 86 and 87 as subordinate units. Participated in the Battle of the Bulge under 5th Panzer Army. Placed under command of 1st Parachute Army in 1945; in the Lower Rhine region towards the end of the war.
Volks-Werfer-Brigade 17	People's Launcher Brigade 17	Formed on 11 October 1944 in Bremen (Wehrkreis X). Sent from Seesen to the Western Front on 23 November 1944 with Launcher Regiments 88 and 89 as subordinate units. Participated in the Battle of the Bulge as part of 6th Panzer Army; subsequently sent to Hungary and made subordinate to 6th Army.
Volks-Werfer-Brigade 18	People's Launcher Brigade 18	Formed on 30 November 1944 in Bremen (Wehrkreis X). Sent from Verden to the Western Front on 7 December 1944 with Heavy Launcher Regiments 21 and 22. Participated in the Battle of the Bulge as part of 7th Army; subsequently part of 1st Army in the Saar Palatinate region.
Volks-Werfer-Brigade 19	People's Launcher Brigade 19	Formed on 10 December 1944 in Celle (Wehrkreis XI). Sent from Salzwedel to the Western Front on 17 December 1944 with Heavy Launcher Regiments 23 and 24. Subsequently redeployed to Hungary, where it was placed under 6th Army towards the end of the war.
Volks-Werfer-Brigade 20	People's Launcher Brigade 20	Formed on 10 December 1944 in Celle (Wehrkreis XI). Sent from Hildesheim to the Western Front on 20 December 1944 with Heavy Launcher Regiments 25 and 26. Part of the 1st Army in the Saarpfalz towards the end of the war.
Werfer-Brigade 1	Launcher Brigade 1	Formed on 1 March 1944 (as per decree of 7 January 1944) under AG South with Launcher Regiments 1 and 57. Renamed People's Launcher Brigade 1 in November 1944.
Werfer-Brigade 2	Launcher Brigade 2	Formed on 1 March 1944 from the staff of Kommandeur der Nebeltruppe 2, strengthened by the addition of Heavy Launcher Regiment 3 and Launcher Regiment 70. Redesignated People's Launcher Brigade 2 in November 1944.
Werfer-Brigade 3	Launcher Brigade 3	Formed on 1 March 1944 from the staff of Kommandeur der Nebeltruppe 3 with Heavy Launcher Regiment 13 and Launcher Regiment 52. Renamed People's Launcher Brigade 3 in November 1944.
Werfer-Brigade 4	Launcher Brigade 4	Formed on 1 March 1944 from the staff of Kommandeur der Nebeltruppe 4 with Launcher Regiments 51 and 53. Redesignated People's Launcher Brigade 4 (Volks-Werfer-Brigade 4) in November 1944.
Werfer-Brigade 5	Launcher Brigade 5	Formed on 7 January 1944 with Launcher Regiments 56 and 71.
Werfer-Brigade 6	Launcher Brigade 6	Formed on 31 January 1944 in Munster Training Area with Launcher Regiments 81 and 82. Sent to the Eastern Front. Subordinate to 4th Army in East Prussia towards the end of the war.
Werfer-Brigade 7	Launcher Brigade 7	Formed in March 1944 in Munster Training Area with Launcher Regiments 83 and 84. Sent to the Western Front and subsequently destroyed during Operation Overlord. Renamed People's Launcher Brigade 7 (Volks-Werfer-Brigade 7).
Werfer-Brigade 8	Launcher Brigade 8	Formed in March 1944 in Munster Training Area with Launcher Training Regiment 1 and Heavy Launcher Regiment 2. Annihilated in Normandy and reassembled; subsequently renamed People's Launcher Brigade 8 on 28 October 1944.
Werfer-Brigade 9	Launcher Brigade 9	Formed on 16 March 1944 in Munster Training Area with Heavy Launcher Regiment 14 and Launcher Regiment 54. Destroyed during Operation Overlord; subsequently reassembled under the name People's Launcher Brigade 9 in November 1944.

=== Engineer brigades ===
This list includes engineer brigades, Volkspionier brigades, army construction engineer brigades, blockade brigades, engineer blockade brigades and railroad engineer brigades.

List of Wehrmacht engineer brigades
German name	Translated name	Notes
Eisenbahn-Pionier-Brigade-Stab 1	Railroad Engineer Brigade Staff 1	Formed on 10 December 1942 through redesignation of Railway Engineer Regiment 3 (Eisenbahn-Pionier-Regiment 3). Placed under command of Army Group A in 1944.
Eisenbahn-Pionier-Brigade-Stab 2	Railroad Engineer Brigade Staff 2	Formed on 1 January 1944 under command of Army Group Centre as a result of a decree dated 9 July 1943.
Eisenbahn-Pionier-Brigade-Stab 3	Railroad Engineer Brigade Staff 3	Formed on 1 October 1944 under command of Army Group North as a result of a decree dated 9 July 1943. Served with Army Group (later Army Group Courland) in 1944. Ended the war with Army Group Vistula in 1945.
Heeres-Baupionier-Brigade 8	Army Construction Engineer Brigade 8	Formed in December 1944 under command of Army Group A from Engineer Regiment Staff 8 and the Construction Engineer Battalions 81, 305, and 407. Placed under command of 4th Panzer Army.
Heeres-Baupionier-Brigade 18	Army Construction Engineer Brigade 18	Formed in December 1944 under Army Group A; staff formed from personnel of Emplacement Construction Engineer Staff 2 (Stellungsbau-Pionier-Stab 2), other elements from Construction Engineer Battalions 18, 523 and 538.
Heeres-Baupionier-Brigade 106	Army Construction Engineer Brigade 106	Does not appear in German military postal records, but is listed in the documents of 16th Army (then trapped in the Courland Pocket) as a subordinate unit.
Heeres-Baupionier-Brigade 107	Army Construction Engineer Brigade 107	Formed in November 1944 under command of Army Group South; three battalions formed from the former Construction Engineer Battalions 109, 24, and 63 (became 1st, 2nd and 3rd battalions). Deployed to the Eastern Front. Subordinate of 8th Army in Slovakia towards the end of the war.
Heeres-Baupionier-Brigade 153	Army Construction Engineer Brigade 153	Formed in November 1944 under Army Group A; staff formed from Emplacement Construction Engineer Staff 5, battalions formed from the Construction Engineer Battalions 153, 214, and 414 (became 1st, 2nd, and 3rd battalions). Sent to Galicia and later Upper Silesia on the Eastern Front; subordinate to 17th Army towards the end of the war.
Heeres-Baupionier-Brigade 155	Army Construction Engineer Brigade 155	Formed in November 1944 from Army Group A; staff formed from the staff of Engineer Regiment 522; battalions formed from the Construction Eingeer Battalions 155, 410, and 723 (became 1st, 2nd, and 3rd battalions). Sent to the Vistula and later to Silesia; placed in the Oder region under command of 9th Army towards the end of the war.
Heeres-Baupionier-Brigade 549	Army Construction Engineer Brigade 549	Formed on 10 August 1944 under command of Army Group A from elements of Engineer Regiment Staff z.b.V. 549 as well as Construction Engineer Battalions 679, 724, and 733 (became 1st, 2nd, and 3rd battalions). Sent to Bohemia-Moravia for reinforcements in 1945.
Heeres-Baupionier-Brigade 686	Army Construction Engineer Brigade 686	Formed in July 1944 under command of Army Group A from elements of Engineer Regiment Staff z.b.V. 686 as well as Construction Engineer Battalions 402, 722, and 726. Fought on the Eastern Front, in German-occupied Poland and later in Silesia.
Heeres-Pionier-Brigade 42	Army Engineer Brigade 42	Formed in November 1944; staff formed from the staff of Engineer Regiment 677, the two battalions formed from Engineer Battalion 42 and Engineer Training Battalion 1. Staff and 1st Battalion deployed to the 17th Army, whereas the 2nd Battalion was detached and separately subordinate to the 9th Army.
Heeres-Pionier-Brigade 44	Army Engineer Brigade 44	Not listed in German military postal records, but appears in reports related to Engineer Battalion 44 under Army Group Courland and the Courland Pocket. Actual deployment questionable.
Heeres-Pionier-Brigade 47	Army Engineer Brigade 47	Formed in November 1944; staff formed from the staff of Engineer Regiment 512, the two battalions formed from Engineer Battalion 47 and from Engineer Training Battalion 2. Became Volks-Pionier-Brigade 47 later in 1944.
Heeres-Pionier-Brigade 52	Army Engineer Brigade 52	Formed in November 1944 under command of Army Group South from the staff of Engineer Regiment 520 as well as the Engineer Battalions 52 and 666. Deployed in Hungary as part of the 6th Army.
Heeres-Pionier-Brigade 62	Army Engineer Brigade 62	Staff listed in German records as formed in July 1944 from the staff of Engineer Regiment 517. Full conversion from regiment to brigade probably never conducted.
Heeres-Pionier-Brigade 70	Army Engineer Brigade 70	Staff formed from 18 June 1944 from the regimental staff of Artillery Regiment 70. Sent to the Eastern Front; deployed to East Prussia towards the end of the war.
Heeres-Pionier-Brigade 127	Army Engineer Brigade 127	Formed in November 1944 in Wehrkreis V; staff formed from the staff of Engineer Regiment 511, two battalions formed from the Engineer Battalions 127 and 651.
Heeres-Pionier-Brigade 655 (Radf.)	Army Engineer Brigade 655 (bicycle)	Formed in November 1944 from Engineer Battalions 655 and 676. Placed under command of 4th Panzer Army; finished the war near Görlitz.
Heeres-Pionier-Brigade 687	Army Engineer Brigade 687	Formed in January 1945 in Wehrkreis III with two bicycle-based battalions. Sent on 16 February 1945 from Rathenow to SS Brigade Dirlewanger (see SS infantry brigades) to strengthen the Dirlewanger Brigade into the 36th SS Division; became part of 36th SS Division on 1 March 1945.
Heeres-Pionier-Brigade 688	Army Engineer Brigade 688	Formed in January 1945 in Wehrkeis IV with staff and one battalion. Never saw action; last present in Weißenfels.
Heeres-Pionier-Sturm-Brigade 46	Army Engineer Assault Brigade 46	Formed in November 1944; deleted from German military records soon after. Appears in records regarding Army Group B.
Heeres-Pionier-Sturmbrigade 627	Army Engineer Assault Brigade 627	Formed in October 1944; staff taken from Engineer Regiment Staff 669, battalions integrated by absorbing Engineer Assault Battalion 627, 501, and 500 (became 1st, 2nd, and 3rd battalions).
Pionier-Sperrbrigade 1100	Engineer Blockade Brigade 1100	Started to undergo deployment at the Ersatzheer in April 1945. Never finished deployment.
Sperrbrigade 1	Blockade Brigade 1	Formed in German-occupied Poland in 1944. Placed under command of XXXXVI Corps (2nd Army) in West Prussia in January 1945.

=== Supply brigades ===
List of Wehrmacht supply brigades
German name	Translated name	Notes
Brigade-Nachschubführer 40	Brigade Resupply Leader 40	Formed on 1 August 1939 in Wehrkreis I. Becomes Division Resupply Leader 40 (Divisions-Nachschubführer 40) on 1 December 1939.
Kommandeur Brigade-Nachschubtruppen 152	Commander Brigade Supply Troops 152	Formed on 18 October 1943 from Commander of Infantry Division Resupply Troops 152 (Kommandeur der Infanterie-Divisions-Nachschubtruppen 152) as a result of the dissolution of the 52nd Infantry Division. Later joined 1st Ski Brigade (see infantry brigades); became Commander of Division Supply Troops 152 (Kommandeur der Divisions-Nachschubtruppen 152) on 2 June 1944.
Kommandeur Brigade-Nachschubtruppen 999	Commander Brigade Supply Troops 999	Formed on 6 October 1942 in Heuberg in Wehrkreis V as a support element for Afrika-Brigade 999 (see infantry brigades). Became Commander of Division Supply Troops 999 (Kommandeur der Divisions-Nachschubtruppen 999) on 2 February 1943.
Mineralöl-Brigade Krasnodar	Mineral Oil Brigade Krasnodar	Formed before 1943 in anticipation of the success of Case Blue to prepare German oil production in the Caucasian oil fields. Also known as Mineral Oil Brigade Caucasus (Mineralöl-Brigade Kaukasus). Made superfluous by the German withdrawal from the Caucasus. Assigned a dedicated signals company in 1942.
Wirtschafts-Kraftwagen-Transport-Brigade z.b.V. 1	Economic Motor Vehicle Transport Brigade z.b.V. 1	11 November 1941 redesignation of the Economic Motor Vehicle Transport Regiment z.b.V. 603 (Wirtschafts-Kraftwagen-Transport-Regiment z.b.V. 603). Redesignated "Economic Road Transport Brigade z.b.V. 1" (see below) on 1 May 1943.
Wirtschafts-Straßen-Transport-Brigade z.b.V. 1	Economic Road Transport Brigade z.b.V. 1	Redesignation on 1 May 1943 of Economic Motor Vehicle Transport Brigade z.b.V. 1 (see above). Dissolved 30 April 1944.
Wirtschafts-Straßen-Transport-Brigade z.b.V. 2	Economic Road Transport Brigade z.b.V. 2	Formed as result of a decree dated 12 April 1943, intended to oversee road network construction on the Eastern Front. Dissolved on 30 March 1944.

=== Security brigades ===
List of Wehrmacht security brigades
German name	Translated name	Notes
Sicherungs-Brigade 74	Security Brigade 74	Formed in June 1944 in German-occupied France; initially deployed in Montargis. Equipped with Security Regiments 1000 and 1010 as well as Reconnaissance Detachment 100. Participated in combat on the Western Front, last near Belfort.
Sicherungs-Brigade 201	Security Brigade 201	Formed on 15 June 1941 in Fulda as Replacement Brigade 201, redesignated Security Brigade 201 on 5 February 1942 and assigned to the Army Group Rear Area Command of Army Group Centre. Became 201st Security Division on 1 June 1942.
Sicherungs-Brigade 202	Security Brigade 202	Formed on 24 December 1941 from Replacement Brigade 202, subsequently became Oberfeldkommandantur 392.
Sicherungs-Brigade 203	Security Brigade 203	Formed on 24 December 1941 from Replacement Brigade 203; sent to Kielce in the Rear Area of Army Group Centre; subsequently upgraded into the 203rd Security Division.

== Kriegsmarine ==
=== Naval infantry brigades ===
As the Kriegsmarine was not initial designed to field centralized large-scale naval infantry formations, German naval infantry was usually organized below brigade level prior to 1944 (for example in the form of autonomous Naval Rifle Battalions). Two exceptions existed: Naval Brigade Weber was formed in August 1944 to enable naval infantry forces in German-occupied southwestern France to withdraw and to escape the Allied invasion forces. Subsequently, the formation of compact naval infantry formations was prepared at the division level. To that end, a short-lived brigade, the Naval Rifle Brigade North, was formed in November 1944. It was eventually integrated into the first of the newly-formed naval infantry divisions in early 1945.

List of Wehrmacht naval infantry brigades
German name	Translated name	Notes
Marine-Brigade Weber	Naval Brigade Weber	Formed in August 1944 in Bordeaux (German-occupied France) with three naval infantry regiments (named "v. Pflugk-Harttung", "Badermann", and "Kühnemann"). Formed for the purpose of withdrawing from France to Germany. Dissolved in September 1944. Remnant elements integrated into 1st Marine Division in February 1945.
Marine-Schützen-Brigade Nord	Naval Rifle Brigade North	Formed in November 1944 in Husum for the purpose of coastal defense in the North Sea coast area. Initially equipped with Naval Rifle Regiments 1, 2, 3, and 4, each with four Naval Rifle Battalions (301 to 304, 305 to 308, 309 to 312 and 313 to 316, respectively). Naval Rifle Regiment 3 was subsequently sent to the Eastern Front to fight on the Vistula front, whereas the other three regiments were used to form the 1st Marine Division in Stettin in February 1945. Naval Rifle Brigade North subsequently ceased to exist.

=== Naval anti-aircraft brigades ===
List of Wehrmacht naval anti-aircraft brigades
German name	Translated name	Notes
Marine-Bordflak-Brigade Nord	Naval Board Flak Brigade North	Formed on 15 March 1942 in Hamburg. Contained four Board Flak Detachments in 1943 (each named after its headquarter city until mid-1943, then numbered sequentially). Existed until 1945. Contained seven Board Flak Detachment in January 1945.
Marine-Flak-Brigade I	Naval Flak Brigade I	Formed on 1 May 1942.
Marine-Flak-Brigade II	Naval Flak Brigade II	Formed from 2nd Naval Flak Regiment on 1 May 1942. Deployed to East Frisia for the purpose of coastal air defense.
Marine-Flak-Brigade III	Naval Flak Brigade III	Formed on 3 October 1943 from Naval Board Flak Detachment Oslo with eight companies (Kristiansand, Bergen, Trondheim, Tromsö, Oslo, Narvik, Hammerfest, Kirkenes) in German-occupied Norway. Three companies later transferred to Naval Board Flak Detachment 7 on 18 December 1944.
Marine-Flak-Brigade IV	Naval Flak Brigade IV	Formed in April 1943 in Lorient from the renamed 20th Naval Flak Regiment.
Marine-Flak-Brigade V	Naval Flak Brigade V	Formed in April 1943 in St Nazaire from the renamed 22nd Naval Flak Regiment.

== Luftwaffe ==
=== Air force infantry brigades ===
List of Wehrmacht air force infantry brigades
German name	Translated name	Notes
Brigade General Göring	Brigade General Göring	Formed in July 1942 in German-occupied France using Flak Regiment General Göring, Flak Detachment 211 and Rifle Regiment Herrmann Göring. Later expanded in November 1942 to become Division General Göring (subsequently: 1st Fallschirm-Panzer Division Hermann Göring). Named after Hermann Göring.
Luftwaffen-Brigade Oberrhein	Air Force Brigade Upper Rhine	Formed in December 1944 as a subordinate unit of 19th Army in the Upper Rhine area. Never exceeded regimental strength. Also known as Regiment Heckel of Brigade Baur.

=== Air force Fallschirmjäger brigades ===
List of Wehrmacht air force Fallschirmjäger brigades
German name	Translated name	Notes
Fallschirmjäger-Brigade "Ramcke"	Paratrooper Brigade "Ramcke"	Formed in August 1942 in the North African theater; equipped with elements of Fallschirmjäger Regiment 3 and Airborne Assault Regiment 1 as well as Luftwaffe Regiment Barenthin; part of the 10th Italian Corps between September 1942 and February 1943. Redesignated Luftwaffen-Jäger-Brigade 1 (see below) on 2 February 1943.
Luftwaffen-Jäger-Brigade 1	Air Force Light Infantry Brigade 1	2 February 1943 redesignation of Paratrooper Brigade "Ramcke" (see above). Surrendered on 1 May 1943.
Schützen-Brigade der Luftwaffe z.b.V.	Luftwaffe Rifle Brigade z.b.V.	Formed in the winter of 1941/42 as a unit of paratroopers.

=== Air force mobile brigades ===
List of Wehrmacht air force mobile brigades
German name	Translated name	Notes
Fallschirm-Panzer-Ausbildungs- und Ersatz-Brigade Hermann Göring	Parachute Panzer Training and Replacement Brigade Hermann Göring	Formed on 25 January 1945 from a regimental unit of approximately the same name (Fallschirm-Panzer-Ausbildungs- und Ersatz-Regiment Hermann Göring). Initially deployed in Rippin (West Prussia) to be subsequently deployed on the Eastern Front. Consisted of two regiments. Destroyed by Red Army forces at Graudenz. Remnants used in March 1945 to assemble a second brigade of the same type (see below).
Fallschirm-Panzer-Ausbildungs- und Ersatz-Brigade 2 Hermann Göring	Parachute Panzer Training and Replacement Brigade 2 Hermann Göring	Formed on 14 March 1945 in Velten and Joachimsthal from the remnants of the first brigade of the same type (see above). Contained two regiments.

=== Air force parachute Sturmgeschütz brigades ===
List of Wehrmacht air force Sturmgeschütz brigades
German name	Translated name	Notes
Sturmgeschütz-Brigade 1 der Luftwaffe	Luftwaffe Sturmgeschütz Brigade 1	Formed in April 1944 from Luftwaffe Sturmgeschütz Detachment 1. Became Fallschirm-Sturmgeschütz-Brigade 11 in June 1944.
Sturmgeschütz-Brigade 2 der Luftwaffe	Luftwaffe Sturmgeschütz Brigade 2	Formed in March 1944 from Luftwaffe Sturmgeschütz Detachment 2. Became Fallschirm-Sturmgeschütz-Brigade 12 in June 1944
Fallschirm-Sturmgeschütz-Brigade Schmitz	Parachute Sturmgeschütz Brigade Schmitz	Formed before January 1945; later became Fallschirm-Sturmgeschütz-Brigade 21.
Fallschirm-Sturmgeschütz-Brigade 12	Parachute Sturmgeschütz Brigade 12	Formed in June 1944 from Luftwaffe Sturmgeschütz Brigade 2. Became Fallschirm-Sturmgeschütz-Brigade 121 on 28 March 1945.
Fallschirm-Sturmgeschütz-Brigade 21	Parachute Sturmgeschütz Brigade 21	Formed on 19 January 1945 from Parachute Sturmgeschütz Brigade Schmitz; equipped with 4 batteries. Eventually renamed Fallschirm-Sturmgeschütz-Brigade 210 (see below) on 28 March 1945. Nominally placed under command of 1st Parachute Army on the Western Front, but likely saw action in the Italian theater instead.
Fallschirm-Sturmgeschütz-Brigade 111	Parachute Sturmgeschütz Brigade 111	Formed on 28 March 1945 from Luftwaffe Sturmgeschütz Brigade 11.
Fallschirm-Sturmgeschütz-Brigade 121	Parachute Sturmgeschütz Brigade 121	Formed on 28 March 1945 from Luftwaffe Sturmgeschütz Brigade 12.
Fallschirm-Sturmgeschütz-Brigade 210	Parachute Sturmgeschütz Brigade 210	Formed on 28 March 1945 from Parachute Sturmgeschütz Brigade 21. Nominally placed under command of 1st Parachute Army on the Western Front, but likely saw action in Italy instead.

=== Flak brigades ===
List of Wehrmacht air force anti-aircraft brigades
German name	Translated name	Notes
Flak-Brigade I	1st Flak Brigade	Formed twice, once in 1940–1941 as Flak-Brigade I and once in 1944–1945 as Flak-Brigade 1.: Flak-Brigade I: Formed on 1 June 1940 in German-occupied France as part of I Flak Corps with Flak Regiments 102 and 103. Redeployed to Dessau on 14 December 1940 and dissolved altogether in March 1941 to form the new 1st Flak Corps.; Flak-Brigade 1: Assembled in German-occupied Paris in February 1944. Retreated from occupied France via Meaux (Aug. 1944), Trier (Sep./Oct. 1944), Amersfoort (Nov. 1944), Aldenhoven (Dec. 1944–Feb. 1945), Cologne (Feb./Mar. 1945) and Düsseldorf (Apr. 1945). Trapped in the Ruhr cauldron and captured on 18 April 1945. Part of 16th Flak Division after November 1944, part of 7th Flak Division after February 1945. Under III Flak Corps after September 1944.
Flak-Brigade II	2nd Flak Brigade	Formed twice, once in 1940–1941 as Flak-Brigade II and once in 1944–1945 as Flak-Brigade 2.: Flak-Brigade II: Formed on 1 June 1940 in German-occupied France as part of I Flak Corps with Flak Regiments 101 and 104. Dissolved in April 1942.; Flak-Brigade 2: Assembled in Dessau under Luftgau III in February 1944. Positioned in Bielefeld-Brackwede in February 1945.
Flak-Brigade III	3rd Flak Brigade	Formed twice, once in 1940–1942 as Flak-Brigade III and once beginning in 1943 as Flak-Brigade 3.: Flak-Brigade III: Formed on 1 June 1940 in Cambrai in preparation of the anticipated Operation Sea Lion. Headquartered at Lumbres in March 1941. Redeployed to Ploiesti (Romania) in late 1941. Redesignated 15th Flak Division in April 1942.; Flak-Brigade 3: Assembled in German-occupied northern Italy on 1 November 1943 from Flakführer Oberitalien. Participated in the Battle of Anzio. Headquartered in Cremona in October 1944.
Flak-Brigade IV	4th Flak Brigade	Formed twice, once as Flak-Brigade IV (after 1943: Flak-Brigade 4) in 1940–1944 and once as Flak-Brigade 4 in 1944–1945.: Formed (as Flak-Brigade IV) on 1 June 1940 in Cambrai as part of II Flak Corps. Deployed to Munich under control of Luftgau VII on 29 September 1942. Redesignated Flak-Brigade 4 in 1943. Upgraded to become 26th Flak Division on 1 May 1944.; Formed (as Flak-Brigade 4) in Dresden in October 1944 from Flak Regiment Staff 184. Headquartered in Dresden-Mockritz in January 1945. Sent to Bohemia-Moravia on 11 February 1945 to take command of all Flak forces of Luftgau VIII. Deployed to Plzen at the very end of the war.
Flak-Brigade V	5th Flak Brigade	Formed as Flak-Brigade V in August 1940 in Rennes in German-occupied France from the staff of Flak Regiment 20 (Flak Brigade Veith) to oversee air defense in the Orleans-Nantes-Brest area. Became Flak-Brigade 5 in 1943 and was redeployed to Nîmes in southern France in May 1944. Afterwards, it retreated to Belfort/Strasbourg after the Allied invasion. Reassigned in October 1944 to take command of all railroad Flak units. Upgraded to divisional level in March 1945 to become 30th Flak Division.
Flak-Brigade VI	6th Flak Brigade	Formed twice, once as Flak-Brigade VI in 1939–1943 and once as Flak-Brigade 6 in 1944–1945.: Flak-Brigade VI: Formed on 1 December 1939 in Luftgau XI. Later redeployed to Mönchengladbach (Luftgau VI) and Rendsburg (Luftgau XI). Participated in the Battle of France with the Flak Regiments 40 and 45. Under II Flak Corps after 16 December 1940. Briefly deployed to Romania in 1942. Used to form 21st Flak Division on 1 March 1943.; Flak-Brigade 6: Assembled in Stettin on 25 August 1944 from Flak Regiment Staff 172. Deployed in the Oder sector towards the end of the war, equipped with Flak Regiments 3, 7, 121 and 184.
Flak-Brigade VII	7th Flak Brigade	Formed twice, once as Flak-Brigade VII (1940–1942) and once as Flak-Brigade 7 (1944–1945).: Flak-Brigade VII: Formed on 1 February 1940 in Mayen from Anti Aircraft Command Moselle (Luftabwehr-Kommando Mosel). Integrated the Flak Regiment 7 in summer 1940. Deployed to Luxembourg and latter to the Caen-Cherbourg-Channel Islands area in occupied France. Used in August 1942 to form the 19th Flak Division.; Flak-Brigade 7: Assembled in Linz on 1 April 1944. Under V Flak Corps in April 1945.
Flak-Brigade VIII	8th Flak Brigade	Formed as Flak-Brigade VIII on 7 February 1941 in Oldenburg from the staff of Flak Regiment 26. Deployed to Hannover on 5 June 1941 and to Wismar in January 1943. Redesignated Flak-Brigade 8 in 1943. Deployed to Oldenburg in February 1944 and to Hannover on 5 May 1944.
Flak-Brigade IX	9th Flak Brigade	Formed three times, once as Flak-Brigade IX and twice as Flak-Brigade 9.: Formed as Flak-Brigade IX on 1 August 1941 in Voision near Ramboullet from the staff of Flak Regiment 129. Placed under command of Army Group Centre on the Eastern Front. Used in March 1942 for the staff of the 12th Flak Division. Equipped with an air signals detachment (later: Signals Detachment 132, 12th Flak Division).; Formed as Flak-Brigade 9 in August 1944 in Stuttgart from the staff of Flak Regiment 75. Used in October 1944 to form the staff of 28th Flak Division.; Formed as Flak-Brigade 9 in January 1945 in the German-occupied Netherlands, by the redesignation of Flak Brigade 20 (see below). Initially under 16th Flak Division. Under VI Flak Corps after 10 February 1945. Deployed in Huis ter Heide with the 25th Army.
Flak-Brigade X	10th Flak Brigade	Formed on 1 April 1941 in Dortmund as Flak Brigade z.b.V. (Flak-Brigade z.b.V.) for the purpose of aerial defensive operations in the eastern Ruhr region and the Münsterland. Redesignated Flak-Brigade X in summer 1941. Sent to the Eastern Front to serve in the Bakhmach sector in the Army Group Rear Area Command of Army Group Centre. Redesignated Flak-Brigade 10 in summer 1943. Saw frontline combat in the Vitebsk area between November 1943 and February 1944, then sent to Brest-Litovsk and Baranivichy in the rear area. Deployed to East Prussia in September 1944. Dissolved on 1 October 1944 to form the staff of Flak Regiment 116.
Flak-Brigade XI	11th Flak Brigade	Formed twice, once as Flak-Brigade XI (later: Flak-Brigade 11) and once as Flak-Brigade 11.: Formed on 29 November 1941 in German-occupied Belgium/Northern France at Lumbres; deployed to Saintes in southwestern France in November 1942 covering airspace between Gironde and the Spanish border; deployed to Guernsey in the German-occupied Channel Islands on 1 April 1943 (position swap with Flak Brigade XII (see below)); redesignated Flak-Brigade 11 in 1943 before being used to form the staff for the staff of Air Force General Channel Islands (General der Luftwaffe Kanalinseln).; Formed on 1 June 1944 in East Prussia from elements of Flak Group Königsberg (Flakgruppe Königsberg); upgraded to become 27th Flak Division in September 1944. Under Luftgau-Kommando I.
Flak-Brigade XII	12th Flak Brigade	Formed in December 1941 in the German-occupied Channel Islands. Traded positions with Flak Brigade XI (see above) on 1 April 1943 and redeploys to southwestern France. Redesignated Flak-Brigade 12 in 1943. Dissolved after the post-Overlord withdrawal from southern France; used to form Regiment Staff 145. Continues to appear in German military records until 1945.
Flak-Brigade XIII	13th Flak Brigade	Formed in June 1942; deployed to northern Finland. Became Flak-Brigade 13 in 1943. Deployed to German-occupied northern Norway in July 1944. Probably dissolved on 27 January 1945, but continues to appear (first at the Rhine and then at Berlin) in German military postal records.
Flak-Brigade XIV	14th Flak Brigade	Formed on 1 June 1942 in Oslo (German-occupied Norway) to oversee air space defense in occupied Norway. Became Flak-Brigade 14 in 1943. Upgraded on 27 February 1945 to become 29th Flak Division; subsequently dissolved.
Flak-Brigade XV	15th Flak Brigade	Formed twice, once as Flak-Brigade XV (later: Flak-Brigade 15) and once as Flak-Brigade 15.: Formed as Flak-Brigade XV in June 1942 in Hannover (Luftgau XI); became Flak-Brigade 15 in 1943. Sent to Upper Silesia in May 1944 to guard the local industrial plants, especially the chemical plants. Became 11th Flak Division in September 1944. Under Luftgau-Kommando I after October 1944.; Formed as Flak-Brigade 15 in October 1944 in Danzig from the staff of Flak Regiment 62 (Flak Group Danzig); fought on the Eastern Front under 3rd Panzer Army in Pomerania, then under II Flak Corps south of Stettin with Flak Regiments 6, 138 and 145.
Flak-Brigade XVI	16th Flak Brigade	Formed twice, once as Flak-Brigade XVI in 1942–1943 and once as Flak-Brigade 16 in 1944–1945: Formed in September 1942 in Vienna; became 24th Flak Division in December 1943.; Formed on 24 October 1944 in Goldap (East Prussia) from the staff of Flak Regiment 110 to protect Wolf's Lair; withdrawn westwards in March 1945, deployed near Wittenberge towards the end of the war.
Flak-Brigade XVII	17th Flak Brigade	Formed twice, once active in 1942–1943 and once in 1944–45, Formed as Flak-Brigade XVII in winter 1942/43 in Italy. Redesignated Flak-Brigade 17 in 1943. Became General of Flak Artillery South (General der Flakartillerie Süd) later in 1943; subsequently further reformed to become 25th Flak Division.; Formed as Flak-Brigade 17 in April 1944 in Hungary from the staff of Flak Regiment 71, headquartered at Budapest. Created to serve under the commanding Luftwaffe general for German aerial forces in Hungary (Kommandierender General der Deutschen Luftwaffe in Ungarn). Contained not just German but also Hungarian anti-aircraft units as subordinate forces. Destroyed in Budapest and dissolved on 1 February 1945; remnants subsequently used to assemble Flak Regiment 37 towards the very end of the war.
Flak-Brigade XVIII	18th Flak Brigade	Formed as Flak-Brigade XVIII on 27 January 1943 in Nîmes in southern German-occupied France. Redesignated Flak-Brigade 18 in 1943. Sent to Cambrai (German-occupied Belgium/northern France) in November 1943, with Flak Regiments 87, 85 and 656. Under III Flak Corps after September 1944, with headquarters at Sonsbeck and in charge of Flak Regiments 95, 100, and 124 (positioned at Xanten, Mönchengladbach and Kempen, respectively). Under VI Flak Corps after 10 February 1945. Deployed with the 1st Parachute Army. Deployed to Münster, Oldenburg and Cuxhaven towards the end of the war.
Flak-Brigade XIX	19th Flak Brigade	Formed in early 1943 in Amsterdam (Luftgau Holland) in the German-occupied Netherlands. Became Flak-Brigade 19. Equipped (among others) with Flak Regiment 111. In Hertogenbosch in May 1944. Under III Flak Corps after September 1944. Active in the Eifel region in November 1944 near Waxweiler, Kyllburg, and Hives. Finished the war in Luftgau XIV near Frankfurt/Main.
Flak-Brigade XX	20th Flak Brigade	Formed in June 1943 in Stuttgart from the staff of Flak Regiment 75. Became Flak-Brigade 20 in 1943; sent to Doullens (German-occupied Belgium/northern France). Attached in September 1944 as z.b.V. formation of Luftwaffe Command West. Under III Flak Corps after September 1944. Became Flak-Brigade 9 (see above), resulting in subsequent dissolution, in January 1945.
Flak-Brigade XXI	21st Flak Brigade	Formed on 19 April 1943 in Nuremberg from the staff of Flak Regiment 93 (Flak Group Nuremberg). Became Flak-Brigade 21 in 1943; sent to Halle-Merseburg in October 1944. Remnant elements attached to Flak Brigade z.b.V. Roessner in 1945.
Flak-Brigade 22 (mot.)	Motorized Flak Brigade 22	Formed in January 1943 on Sicily to secure the airspace of the Strait of Messina; subsequently under 10th Army during the Italian campaign.
Flak-Scheinwerfer-Brigade I	Anti-Aircraft Searchlight Brigade I	Formed in July 1940 near Arnhem in the German-occupied Netherlands to assist nighttime air defense. Upgraded to Anti-Aircraft Searchlight Division 1 (Flak-Scheinwerfer-Division 1) on 1 August 1941. Dissolved on 31 July 1942.
Flak-Scheinwerfer-Brigade II	Anti-Aircraft Searchlight Brigade II	Formed in September 1940 in northern Germany to assist nighttime air defense. Upgraded to Anti-Aircraft Searchlight Division 2 (Flak-Scheinwerfer-Division 2) on 1 August 1941. Rearranged into Nachtjagddivision 2 on 31 July 1942 and subsequently dissolved.

=== Air force air space protection brigades ===
List of Wehrmacht air force air space protection brigades
German name	Translated name	Notes
Luftschutz-Brigade der Luftwaffe 1	Luftwaffe Air Space Protection Brigade 1	Formed in 1942/43, dissolved in 1944.

=== Air force construction brigades ===
List of Wehrmacht air force construction brigades
German name	Translated name	Notes
Luftwaffen-Bau-Brigade I	Luftwaffe Construction Brigade I	Staff formed in 1942, dissolved in winter 1942/43.
Luftwaffen-Bau-Brigade II	Luftwaffe Construction Brigade II	Staff formed in 1942, dissolved in winter 1942/43.
Luftwaffen-Bau-Brigade III	Luftwaffe Construction Brigade III	Staff formed in 1942, dissolved in winter 1942/43.
Luftwaffen-Bau-Brigade IV	Luftwaffe Construction Brigade IV	Staff formed in summer 1941, dissolved in winter 1942/43.
Luftwaffen-Bau-Brigade V	Luftwaffe Construction Brigade V	Staff formed in summer 1941, dissolved in winter 1942/43.
Luftwaffen-Bau-Brigade VI	Luftwaffe Construction Brigade VI	Staff formed in 1941. Deployed to western France in October 1941. Dissolved in Winter 1942/43.

=== Air force NSKK brigades ===
Two brigades of the National Socialist Motor Corps (NSKK) were formed under the supervision of the Luftwaffe.

List of Wehrmacht air force NSKK brigades
German name	Translated name	Notes
NSKK-Brigade der Luftwaffe 1	Air Force NSKK Brigade 1	Staff formed in summer 1941 to serve as leadership institution for NSKK Regiments. After 1943: NSKK Brigade z.b.V. (NSKK-Brigade z.b.V.), without an ordinal number.
NSKK-Brigade der Luftwaffe 2	Air Force NSKK Brigade 2	Staff formed in summer 1941, dissolved in winter 1943/44.

== Schutzstaffel (SS) ==
=== SS infantry brigades ===
List of SS infantry brigades
German name	Translated name	Notes
Französische SS-Freiwilligen-Sturmbrigade	French SS Volunteer Assault Brigade	Main article: SS Volunteer Sturmbrigade France Collection of French volunteers for German military service (see also LVF), recruited after an order of 3 March 1943 and designated French SS Volunteer Regiment 57 on 12 November 1943. Later upgraded to the French Volunteer SS Assault Brigade in July 1944. Integrated (as 1st Regiment) into the Charlemagne Brigade on 28 August 1944.
Schutzmannschaft-Brigade Siegling	Protective Forces Brigade Siegling	Main article: Schutzmannschaft-Brigade Siegling Formed in late July 1944 from several Schutzmannschaft battalions located northeast of Warsaw in German-occupied Poland, under the leadership of Hans Siegling. Consisted of four rifle regiments, one artillery unit and one cavalry unit. Ordered by a decree dated 31 July 1944 to be upgraded to 30th Waffen Grenadier Division of the SS (2nd Russian).
SS-Brigade 1 Reichsführer-SS	SS Brigade 1 Reichsführer-SS	Formed in 1941 under the supervision of Southeastern Command, with SS Infantry Regiments 8 and 10. Redesignated "1st SS Infantry Brigade (motorized)" (1. SS-Infanterie-Brigade (mot.)) in 1943.
SS-Brigade 2 Reichsführer-SS	SS Brigade 2 Reichsführer-SS	Formed in 1941 under the supervision of Northwestern Command, with SS Infantry Regiments 4, 5, and 14. 14th Regiment dissolved already in summer of 1941. 5th Regiment dissolved in winter 1941/42. 4th Regiment reassigned to 2nd SS Panzer Division in December 1941 (where it became SS Regiment Langemark on 20 April 1942), leaving SS Brigade 2 with only a collection of smaller units (Volunteer Legion Netherlands, Flemish Legion, Escort Battalion RFSS). Redesignated 2nd SS Infantry Brigade (motorized) in 1942, which became the 2nd Latvian SS Brigade (see below) on 18 May 1943.
SS-Feldersatz-Brigade 102	SS Field Replacement Brigade 102	Formed in January 1945 in Altenkirchen under command of II SS Panzer Corps.
1. SS-Polizei-Jäger-Brigade	1st SS Police Light Brigade	Not strictly part of the Waffen-SS but rather the Ordnungspolizei. Paramilitary police unit active in early 1945. Formed in the Angermünde area, listed in the German military postal service as Polizei-Jäger-Brigade and in the documents of Army Group Vistula as SS-Polizei-Brigade 1. Both unit designations likely refer to the same force. Probably designated Polizei-Jäger-Brigade 8 between 19 March and 28 March 1945, before appearing in the documents at regimental strength, as Regiment Polizei-Jäger-Brigade 1 under 1st Naval Infantry Division.
1. SS-Infanterie-Brigade (mot.)	1st SS Infantry Brigade (motorized)	Main article: 1st SS Infantry Brigade 1943 redesignation of SS Brigade 1 Reichsführer-SS (see above). Equipped with SS Grenadier Regiments 39 and 40, as well as several support detachments, companies and battalions. Integrated into 18th SS Volunteer Panzergrenadier Division Horst Wessel in the Zagreb-Cilli area in January 1944.
2. Lettische SS-Freiwilligen-Brigade	2nd Latvian SS Volunteer Brigade	Main article: 2nd Latvian SS Infantry Brigade 22 October 1943 redesignation of SS Brigade 2 Reichsführer-SS (see above). The brigade consisted of SS Volunteer Grenadier Regiments 42 and 43 (previously Latvian SS Volunteer Regiments 1 and 2). Expanded by an additional two SS Training Regiments (no. 1 and 2 2nd SS Brigade) in winter 1943/44. Upgraded to divisional status on 7 January 1944; became 19th Waffen Grenadier Division of the SS (2nd Latvian).
3. Estnische SS-Freiwilligen-Brigade	3rd Estonian SS Volunteer Brigade	Main article: 3rd Estonian SS Volunteer Brigade 22 October 1943 redesignation of the Estonian SS Volunteer Brigade, whose assembly had begun under the designation "Estonian SS Legion" in winter 1942/43. The 3rd SS Volunteer Brigade consisted of two SS Volunteer Grenadier Regiments (numbered 45 and 46), as well as several smaller formations. As per a decree issued in January 1944, the brigade was upgraded to divisional status and became the 20th Waffen Grenadier Division of the SS (1st Estonian).
5. SS-Freiwilligen-Sturmbrigade "Wallonien"	5th SS Volunteer Assault Brigade "Wallonia"	Main article: 5th SS-Volunteer Sturmbrigade Wallonien Formed on 1 June 1943 at Wildflecken Training Area as a result of the inclusion of the Walloon Legion (formerly Walloon Infantry Battalion 373) from the Heer into the Waffen-SS, as had been the request of Walloon fascist leader Léon Degrelle. Given the ordinal number 5 as part of the 22 October 1943 sequential numbering of SS formations. After severe casualties in the Cherkassy cauldron, the brigade was refreshed in accordance with an order of 28 April 1944. It received a second battalion on 28 June 1944. On 18 October 1944, the brigade was ordered to be upgraded to divisional status, becoming the 28th SS Volunteer Grenadier Division "Wallonien".
6. SS-Freiwilligen-Sturmbrigade Langemarck	6th SS Volunteer Sturmbrigade Langemarck	Main article: 6th SS Volunteer Sturmbrigade Langemarck Formed on 31 May 1943 at Heidelager Training Area to integrate the Flemish Legion. Given the ordinal number 6 as part of the 22 October 1943 sequential numbering of SS formations. After severe casualties, the brigade was refreshed in accordance with an order of 28 June 1944 and received a second Panzergrenadier Battalion. On 18 October 1944, the brigade was ordered to be upgraded to divisional status, becoming the 27th SS Volunteer Division "Langemarck".
SS-Sturm-Brigade Dirlewanger	SS Assault Brigade Dirlewanger	Main article: SS-Sturmbrigade Dirlewanger Originally upgraded to 2.SS-Sturmbrigade Dirlewanger on 19 December 1944 but had already been unofficially referred to as a "brigade" in early October 1944 during the suppression of the Slovak National Uprising, using the existing SS-Sonderregiment Dirlewanger, which consisted of six battalions. It was later upgraded again to 2. SS-Sturmbrigade Dirlewanger in 14 November 1944 before being sent to the Hungary-Slovakia border at Ipolyság. However, it was delayed due to several issues. The unit had been a penal formation since June 1940, originally subordinated to the 5th Totenkopf-Infanterie-Regiment and had conducted anti-partisan operations in German-occupied Belarus and Poland, notably including the Wola massacre, the mass murder of tens of thousands of Polish civilians following the failed Warsaw Uprising. Named after its commander, Oskar Dirlewanger. Strengthened in February through the addition of Volkdeutsches regiment and Heer battalions. Following a decree of 14 February 1945, it became the 36th Waffen Grenadier Division of the SS, after which it was later placed under supervision of the V Army Corps.
SS-Sturm-Brigade Reichsführer-SS	SS Assault Brigade Reichsführer-SS	Main article: Sturmbrigade Reichsfuhrer SS Formed in summer 1943 from the escort battalion Reichsführer-SS. Deployed to German-occupied Corsica, where it was expanded on 2 October 1943 to become the 16th SS Panzergrenadier Division Reichsführer-SS.
SS-Sturm-Brigade Roma	SS Assault Brigade Roma	First appears in German records in June 1944, probably a staff-only formation. Deployed near Münsingen at the end of the war.
Waffen-Gebirgs-Brigade der SS (tatar. Nr. 1)	SS Waffen Mountain Brigade (1st Tatar)	Formed in Hungary on 8 July 1944 using Crimean Tatars. Initially intended to receive SS ordinal number 58, the assembly of the brigade was never completed. The formation was instead dissolved in Slovakia on 1 January 1945 and its personnel integrated into the Eastern Turkic Waffenverband (Osttürkischer Waffenverband der SS).
Waffen-Grenadier-Brigade der SS "Charlemagne" (franz. Nr. 1)	Waffen Grenadier Brigade SS "Charlemagne" (1st French)	Main article: 33rd Waffen Grenadier Division of the SS Charlemagne Assembled between 28 August 1944 and 30 September 1944 in SS Training Area West Prussia near Konitz from elements of the French SS Volunteer Assault Brigade (see above) as well as Infantry Regiment 638, transferred from the Army into the Waffen-SS. Upgraded in February 1945 to become 33rd SS Waffen Grenadier Division Charlemagne.
Waffen-Grenadier-Brigade der SS (ital. Nr. 1)	Waffen Grenadier Brigade SS (1st Italian)	Main article: Waffen Grenadier Brigade of the SS (1st Italian) Assembled on 7 September 1944 in the German-occupied part of Italy from elements of Italian army forces loyal to the Italian Social Republic. The Italian soldiers were organized in two infantry regiments (numbered 81 and 82), and the intended brigade ordinal number was 59. In February 1945, the brigade was upgraded to divisional status and became the 29th Waffen Grenadier Division of the SS (1st Italian).
Weißruthenische SS-Grenadier-Brigade	White Ruthenian SS Grenadier Brigade	Formed on 15 January 1945 on Grafenwoehr Training Area from the non-Russian remnants of 30th Waffen Grenadier SS Division (2nd Russian). Contained one regiment of three battalions as well as a Panzerjäger detachment, an artillery detachment, a field replacement battalion, a horse squadron, an engineer. Once more upgraded to divisional status and reassigned the ordinal number 30 on 9 March 1945, becoming 30th SS Waffen Grenadier Division (1st White Ruthenian), with the regiment being redesignated SS Waffen Grenadier Regiment 75 (1st White Ruthenian).
SS-Verband "Drushina"	SS Unit Drushina	The SS Unit Drushina was formed in June 1942 from Soviet prisoners of war and placed under the command of Vladimir Gil, known to the Germans as "Radionov". Around 400 members of the unit defected on 13 August 1943. Most of the defectors subsequently joined the Soviet partisans and formed the 1st Anti-Fascist Brigade. Those soldiers who declined to defect later joined the 1st Battalion of the Russian Liberation Army.

=== SS Panzergrenadier brigades ===
List of SS Panzergrenadier brigades
German name	Translated name	Notes
4. SS-Freiwilligen-Panzergrenadier-Brigade "Nederland"	4th SS Volunteer Panzergrenadier Brigade "Nederland"	Main article: 4th SS Volunteer Panzer Grenadier Brigade Nederland Assembled on 23 October 1943 in Thuringia from the Dutch SS Volunteer Legion (announced on 10 July and founded on 12 July, 1941). When the formations of the Waffen-SS were redesignated and sequentially numbered on 12 November 1943, the formation's two grenadier regiments had initially received the ordinal numbers 45 and 46, but were ultimately numbered 48 "General Seyffardt" and 49 "De Ruiter". These designations were extended by the addition of "1st Dutch" and "2nd Dutch" (respectively) on 22 January 1944. The Brigade was restructured on 1 August 1944, leaving the two regiments with only two (rather than the previous three) battalions each. After 11 October 1944, the ordinal number 4 was no longer used. On 10 February 1945, the brigade was upgraded to divisional status and became 23rd SS Volunteer Panzergrenadier Division "Nederland". The brigade had served most of its time with III SS Panzer Corps, with a brief assignment to LXIX Corps in December 1943.
SS-Panzergrenadier-Brigade 49	SS Panzergrenadier Brigade 49	Main article: SS Panzergrenadier Brigade 49 Formed in June 1944 from SS Combat Group 1 (SS-Kampfgruppe 1) as well as elements of SS Combat Group 2 (SS-Kampfgruppe 2). Redesignated 26th SS Panzer Division on 10 August 1944, then promptly dissolved on 8 September 1944; later integrated into SS Panzergrenadier Regiment 37 of 17th SS Panzergrenadier Division Götz von Berlichingen.
SS-Panzergrenadier-Brigade 51	SS Panzergrenadier Brigade 51	Main article: SS Panzergrenadier Brigade 51 Formed in June 1944 from SS Combat Group 3. Briefly became 27th SS Panzer Division between 10 August 1944 and 8 September 1944; then integrated into the SS Panzergrenadier Regiment 38 of 17th SS Panzergrenadier Division Götz von Berlichingen.

=== SS cavalry brigades ===
List of SS cavalry brigades
German name	Translated name	Notes
SS-Kavallerie-Brigade	SS Cavalry Brigade	Main article: SS Cavalry Brigade Created in August 1941 in the opening stages of Operation Barbarossa and attached to Army Group Centre. Consisted of the SS Cavalry Regiments 1 and 2. Fought in the Pripyat Marshes and then around Gomel between July and September 1941. As the activity of Soviet partisans increased, the SS Cavalry Brigade was increasingly used for anti-partisan warfare duties. The brigade was affected heavily by the Soviet winter offensive of 1941/42 and was reduced to Kampfgruppe strength by late March 1942. Remnant elements were gradually withdrawn from the frontline between January and August 1942 (the last one to withdraw being Kampfgruppe Zehender). Became the 8th SS Cavalry Division Florian Geyer in 1942, with the nucleus of the new division being assembled on 21 June 1942.

=== SS panzer brigades ===
List of SS panzer brigades
German name	Translated name	Notes
Panzer-Brigade 150	Panzer Brigade 150	Main article: Panzer Brigade 150 Combined unit of SS and Wehrmacht soldiers (partially selected by English-language skills). Infiltrated Allied lines in US uniforms and with disguised tanks as part of Operation Greif in preparation of the Ardennes Offensive of December 1944. Commanded by Otto Skorzeny.
SS-Brigade Westfalen	SS Brigade Westphalia	Main article: SS Brigade Westfalen The SS Panzer Brigade "Westphalia" was formed on 29 March 1945, and mainly active in early April. It first engaged American forces on 30 March 1945 just outside of Paderborn. After the Allied capture of Paderborn on 1 April, Brigade Westphalia withdrew eastwards in the direction of 11th Army in the Harz.
SS-Panzer-Brigade Gross	SS Panzer Brigade Gross	Formed in August 1944 in the Courland Pocket from the replacement units of the SS armored formations at Seelager Training Area. The brigade contained two infantry battalions, a mixed panzer detachment (four companies), and a panzer reconnaissance detachment (3 companies).

=== SS rocket launcher brigades ===
List of SS rocket launcher brigades
German name	Translated name	Notes
Werfer-Brigade I. SS-Korps	Launcher Brigade 1st SS Corps	Intended as a designated rocket launcher unit under I SS Corps, first appears on paper in the German records in April 1945. Unlikely to have actually existed.

=== SS construction brigades ===
The SS construction brigades were formed from forced laborers (usually male non-Jewish concentration camp inmates) starting in late 1942. These brigades were frequently sent to major German cities damaged by war for clearance wars, and satellite camps of the concentration camps they were originally interned in were often formed to house them.

List of SS construction brigades
German name	Translated name	Notes
SS-Frontarbeiter-Bau-Brigade	SS Front Workers Construction Brigade	Staff-only formation that appears in the German records in February 1944. Likely temporarily in service with Army Group Courland.
SS-Bau-Brigade I	1st SS Construction Brigade	Formed in Sachsenhausen concentration camp in October 1942 from around 1,000 concentration camp inmates. Initially used in Düsseldorf (600 inmates) and Duisburg (400 inmates) to remove rubble after Allied bombing attacks. Sent in early 1943 to Lager Sylt on Alderney (German-occupied Channel Islands) to construct coastal fortifications against a potential Allied invasion. Arrived on Alderney on 23 February 1943, headed by Maximilian List and his deputies Kurt Klebeck and Georg Braun, with some 1060 prisoners (appr. half of them Soviet). Recalled on 24 June 1944 to the European mainland, where the forced laborers had to construct infrastructure for ballistic missiles near the prewar Franco-Belgian border.
SS-Bau-Brigade II	2nd SS Construction Brigade	Assembled from inmates of Neuengamme concentration camp in October 1942; 750 inmates sent to Bremen and 250 to Osnabrück for rubble-clearance operations. Another unit of some 175 inmates existed in Wilhelmshaven between early 1943 and November 1943. 930 inmates sent to Hamburg for clearance operations between 7 August 1943 and April 1944. In mid-April 1944, the brigade was sent from Hamburg to Berlin. As part of this transfer, the subordination of 2nd SS Construction Brigade was transferred from KZ Neuengamme to KZ Sachsenhausen.
SS-Bau-Brigade III	3rd SS Construction Brigade	Formed in September 1942, mainly from inmates of Messelager Köln (but also from Düsseldorf, Dortmund, and Bergisch Gladbach) to conduct construction and rubble clearance labor. Parts sent to Krupp in Essen for forced labor in heavy industry. Elements sent to the camp in Wieda in early May 1944 to assist railway construction as part of the Helmetalbahn project. Such labor included direct railway construction but also the cutting-down of trees. Until late October 1944, the brigade was placed under the supervision of Buchenwald concentration camp, before being transferred to the supervision of Mittelbau concentration camp. Most of the inmates of Wieda concentration camp were forced into a death march into the Harz mountains on 7 April 1945. Many were massacred by German forces in the Gardelegen massacre on 13 April 1945.
SS-Bau-Brigade IV	4th SS Construction Brigade	Formed from forced laborers of Buchenwald concentration camp; used in German cities (notably Wuppertal) for rubble-clearing starting in August 1943. Participated in the construction of KZ Königshöher Weg in August 1943. Remained in Wuppertal until May 1944; subsequently sent to Ellrich, where they participated in the construction of the Helmetalbahn project. The brigade's laborers were forced on a death march between 6 and 10 April 1945 in response to approaching Allied forces. While many inmates were freed in mid-August 1945 by United States forces, a group of some 350 forced laborers of 4th Brigade were massacred along with many forced laborers of 3rd SS Construction Brigade (see above) in the Gardelegen massacre.
SS-Bau-Brigade V	5th SS Construction Brigade	Staff formed in March 1944. Initially assembled in Cologne and then sent to German-occupied northern France, where the brigade took headquarters at Doullens. The forced laborers were tasked with assisting the assembly of V-2 rocket ("Aggregat 4") ballistic missile sites for the Luftwaffe. Last listed as deployed in Osnabrück. Dissolved in late 1944; forced laborers either sent to 3rd and 4th SS Construction Brigades (see above) or used to form the 5th SS Railway Construction Brigade.
SS-Bau-Brigade VI	6th SS Construction Brigade.	First appears in the German records in February 1945.

== Reichsarbeitsdienst (RAD) ==
List of Reich Labour Service brigades
German name	Translated name	Notes
RAD-Brigade Enns	RAD Brigade Enns	Appears in German records in April 1945. Assembled as part of the mobilization (starting 29 March 1945) of the Reich Labour Service (RAD) into four divisions and two mountain brigades. Did not see action.
RAD-Brigade Steiermark	RAD Brigade Styria	Deployment ordered on 25 April 1945. Assembled as part of the mobilization (starting 29 March 1945) of the Reich Labour Service (RAD) into four divisions and two mountain brigades. Did not see action.

== See also ==
- List of World War II military units of Germany
- List of German army groups in World War II
- List of German corps in World War II
- List of German divisions in World War II
- List of Waffen-SS units
