= 1st Ski Division =

- 1. Skijäger-Division
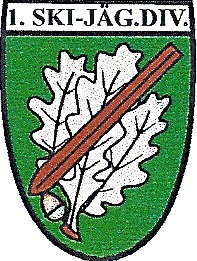
- Unit insignia
- Active: 1943–45
- Country: Nazi Germany
- Branch: German Army; Waffen-SS
- Type: Infantry
- Role: Cold-weather warfare Raiding; Ski warfare
- Size: Division
- Garrison/HQ: Wehrkreis XIII
- Engagements: World War II

The 1st Ski Division (German: 1. Skijäger-Division) was an elite mountain infantry unit of the German Waffen-SS/Army trained to use skis for movement during winter. It was created on the Eastern Front in the autumn of 1943 in preparation for upcoming winter operations. It was enlarged into a full division in the summer of 1944. The division fought exclusively on the Eastern Front as part of Army Group Centre, including an approach to the Vistula river and during the retreat into Slovakia, southern Poland and the Czech lands (now the Czech Republic), where it surrendered to the Red Army in May 1945.

== History ==
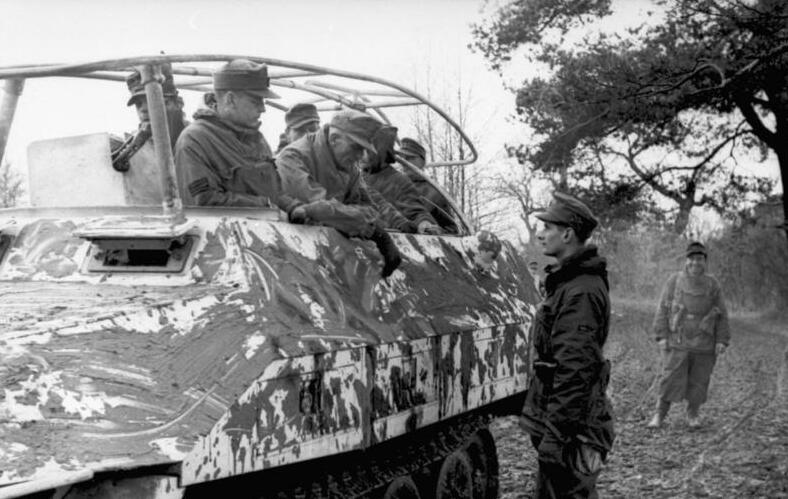
Skijäger-Brigade in 1944.

The American writer and publisher George Nafziger states that the 1st Skijäger Division was formed on 2 June 1944 by expanding the 1st Skijäger Brigade, which had been initially formed in September 1943. As was usual for German formations at this point in the war, the division was formed around existing units which were strengthened with new recruits. Elements of the 19th Panzergrenadier Brigade, the 65th Heavy Artillery Regiment, the 152nd Panzerjäger Battalion and the 18th Werfer (Rocket) Battalion with the 615th Flak (anti-aircraft) Battalion which was used to expand the brigade into a division.

On 1 January 1945, the 1st Ski Division (then under Army Group Heinrici of Army Group A) had a strength of 12,014 men.

== Structure ==
Structure of the division:

- Division Headquarters
- 1st Ski Jäger Regiment
- 2nd Ski Jäger Regiment
- 1st Heavy Ski Battalion
- 152nd Artillery Regiment (eventually included the 18th Panzerwerfer Battalion)
- 1st Ski Fusilier Battalion
- 152nd Ski Tank Destroyer Battalion
- 270th Assault Gun Battalion
- 85th Ski Engineer Battalion
- 152nd Ski Signal Battalion
- 152nd Ski Field Replacement Battalion
- 152nd Ski Division Supply Group

== Commanding officers ==
- Günther von Manteuffel, 1 April 1943 – September 1943
- Martin Berg, 13 May 1944 – 2 August 1944
- Gustav Hundt, 3 October 1944 – 15 November 1944
- Emmanuel von Kiliani, 15 November – 7 December 1944
- Gustav Hundt, 8 December 1944 January 1945
- Hans Steets, January – February 1945
- Gustav Hundt, February – April 1945
- Bruno Weiler, April – May 1945

== Sources ==
- Anderson, Thomas, Skijäger: une "nouvelle race" de guerriers, Batailles & Blindés n°40, décembre 2010–janvier 2011, éditions Caraktère.
- Georg Gunter: Die deutschen Skijäger bis 1945. Podzun-Pallas, Friedberg 2005, ISBN 978-3-8955-5334-9.
- Gustav Fochler-Hauke: Schi-Jäger am Feind. Kurt Vowinckel Verlag, Heidelberg u. a. 1943, DNB-IDN 576010898.
- Mitcham, Samuel W. Jr. (2007). German Order of Battle. Volume Two: 291st – 999th Infantry Divisions, Named Infantry Divisions, and Special Divisions in WWII. PA; United States of America: Stackpole Books. S. 237+238, ISBN 978-0-8117-3437-0.
- Georg Tessin: Verbände und Truppen der deutschen Wehrmacht und Waffen-SS im Zweiten Weltkrieg 1939–1945, Band 2, Frankfurt/Main und Osnabrück, 1966, Seite 25 ff.
- Gordon Williamson: German Mountain & Ski Troops 1939–45. Bloomsbury Publishing, 2012.
- H.Dv. 374/2 Ausbildungsvorschrift für die Gebirgstruppen (A.V.G.) – Heft 2: Der militärische Schilauf (Schivorschrift) – 1938, ISBN 978-3-7519-9969-4.
- Merkblatt Nr. 25b/31 Hinweise für den winterbeweglichen Einsatz der Infanterie – 1943, ISBN 978-3-7534-9569-9.
