= 18th Artillery Division (Wehrmacht) =

- 18. Artillerie-Division
- Active: October 1943 - July 1944
- Country: Nazi Germany
- Branch: German Army
- Type: Artillery
- Role: Fire support
- Size: Division
- Part of: XXXVIII. Armeekorps
- Engagements: World War II: Eastern Front; Kamenets-Podolsky pocket

Commanders
- Notable commanders: Generalleutnant Karl Thoholte

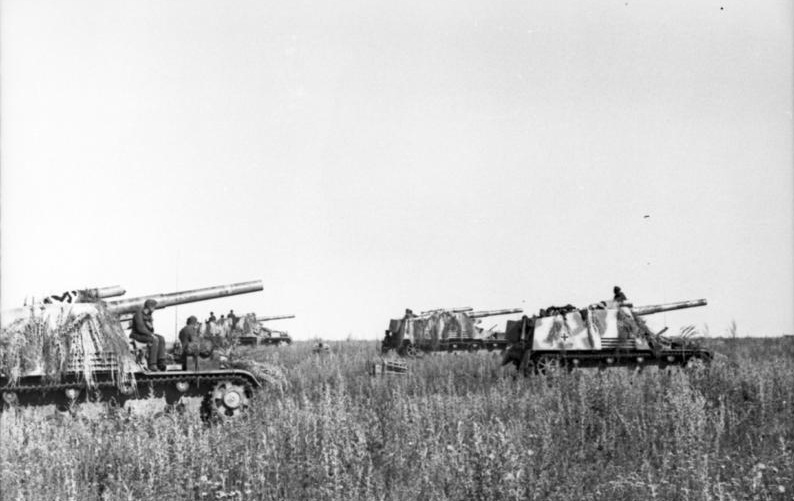
A battery of Hummel 15 cm self-propelled howitzers of the Artillerie-Regiment 88 (mot) ready for firing in 1943

The 18th Artillery Division (German: 18. Artillerie-Division) was a German artillery division formed during World War II in 1943. Being the first independent mobile artillery force it never raised to its planned strength. The division fought at the Eastern Front, suffered heavy losses and was disbanded in 1944.

== Operational history ==
The 18th Artillery Division was formed by combining the staff and some of the remaining corps troops from the 18th Panzer Division, being disbanded on October 1, with other stray units. This division was the first unit planned as an independent and mobile artillery force; and the planned strength for the division was never achieved.

According to General Erhard Raus's memoirs, in December 1943 near Kiev the division included nine artillery battalions and was equipped with sixty light and forty medium artillery pieces, as well as twenty-four assault guns. A special element of this division was that it had its own (heavy) infantry element, the Schützen-Abteilung 88 (tmot) (also known as Art.-Kampf-Btln. 88 and Art.-Alarm-Abteilung 18). Having the mission of defending the artillery in all dangerous situations this battalion, thoroughly trained in rear guard actions, saved the division from total destruction no less than three times.

The division was part of the XXXVIII Army Corps in the 1st Panzer Army. It was in action until late March 1944, when it was encircled in the Kamenets-Podolsky pocket. With the defeat of the Army Group North Ukraine in April 1944, the division’s combat path came to an end. Though it managed to break through it was depleted and lost all of its heavy equipment. It was listed as an integral unit for the last time in April 1944 as Kampfgruppe 18. Art.Div.; and was disbanded in practice in April 1944. Until November 4, 1944, it was engaged in mostly infantry battles; and due to heavy casualties the division nearly ceased to exist. It was formally disbanded on July 27, 1944. The remaining officers and men from staff and corps troops were used to form the Panzerkorps Großdeutschland and the artillery regiments were reformed into several independent artillery brigades.

== Commanders ==
- Generalmajor Karl Thoholte (October 20, 1943 - February 28, 1944)
- Generalmajor Gerhard Müller (February 28, 1944 - April 1944)
- Generalleutnant Karl Thoholte (April 1944 - July 1944)
