= Walter Feyerabend =

German equestrian

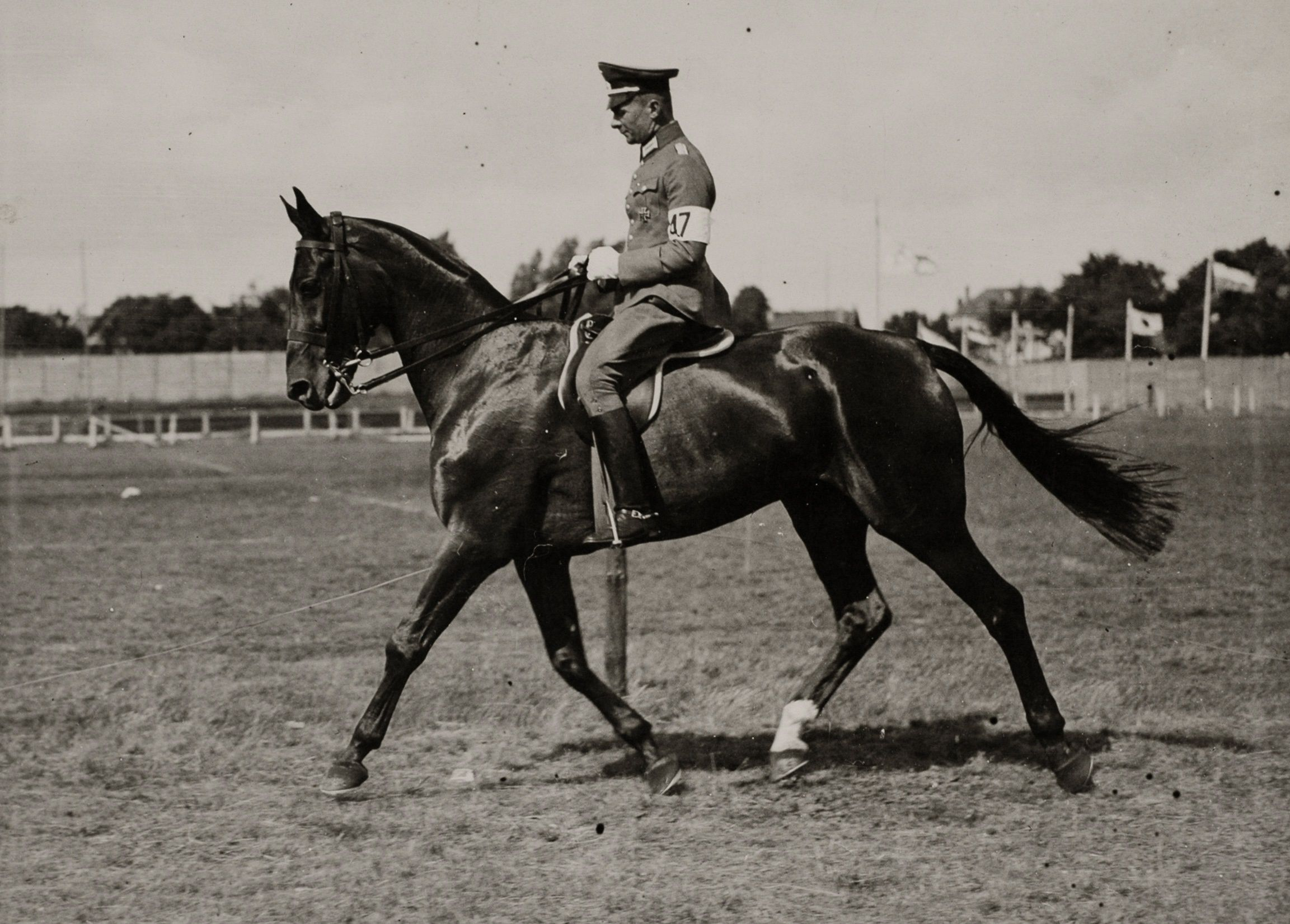
- Born: 3 December 1891; Warthen Estate southwest of Königsberg, Province of East Prussia, Kingdom of Prussia, German Empire
- Died: 17 April 1962 (aged 70); Detmold, North Rhine-Westphalia, West Germany
- Relatives: ∞ 16 October 1924 Margot Johst
- Military career
- Allegiance: Kingdom of Prussia; German Empire; Weimar Republic; Nazi Germany
- Branch: Prussian Army; Imperial German Army; Reichsheer; Luftwaffe
- Service years: 1910–1942/45
- Rank: Generalleutnant
- Commands: Flak-Regiment 25; 2. Flak-Division; 14. Flak-Division; 27. Flak-Division
- Conflicts: World War I World War II
- Awards: Iron Cross
- Other work: Equestrian and participant of the Olympic Games

Walter Franz Georg Feyerabend (3 December 1891 – 17 April 1962) was a German career officer and equestrian. He competed in two events at the 1928 Summer Olympics.

== Life ==
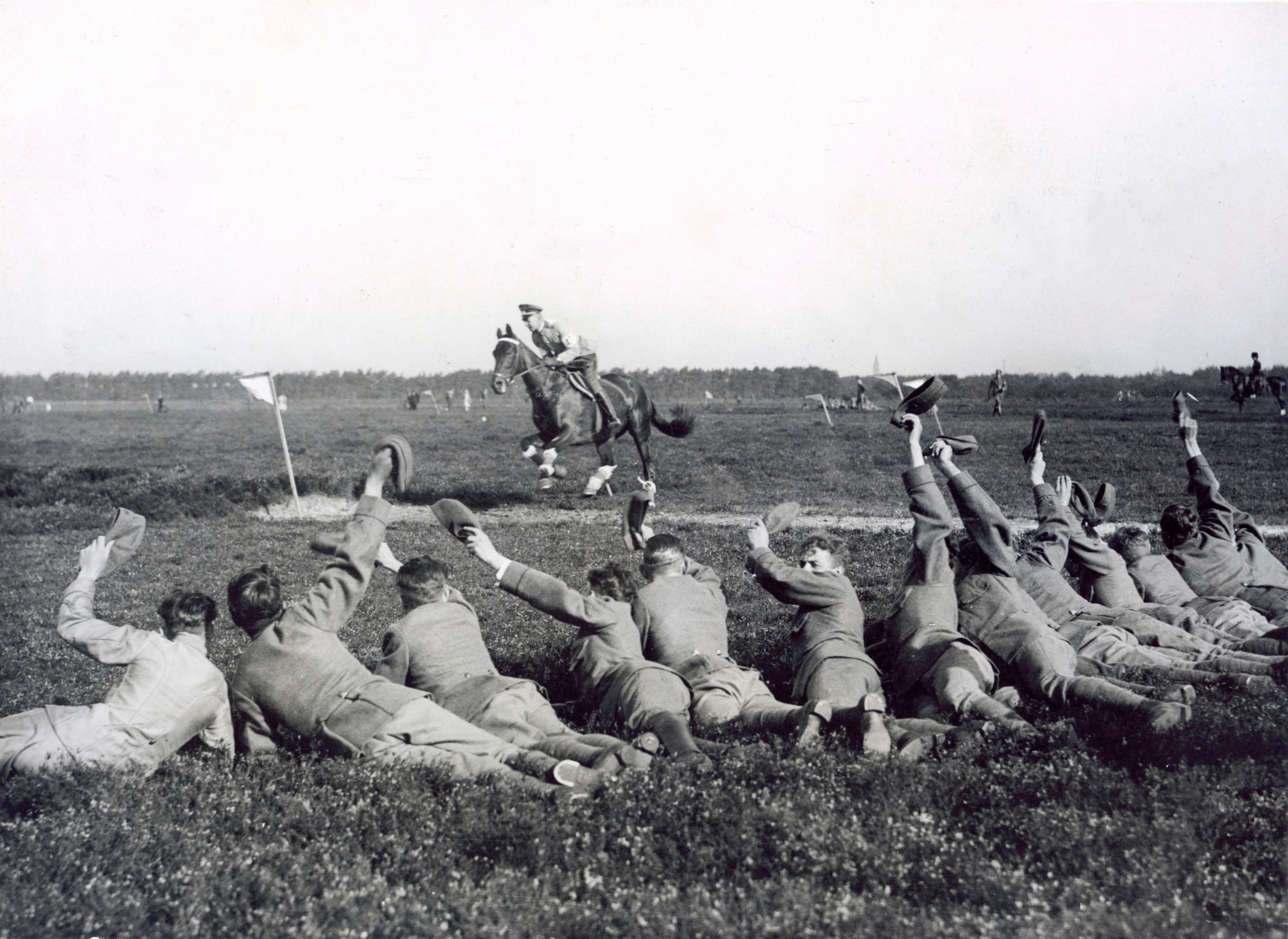

Walter Feyerabend was born in 1891 on the family estate (Gut Warthen) where his father was lord of the manor. Having graduated with honors from the cadet corps, was transferred to the 1st East Prussian Field Artillery Regiment No. 16 as a commissioned 2nd Lieutenant on 1 March 1910. The Feldartillerie (field artillery) was equipped with the lighter cannons to guarantee speed in the field, whereas the Fußartillerie (foot artillery) was equipped with the larger (heavier) calibers.

From 1 March to 30 April 1914, he was seconded to the artillery school in Jüterbog. At the outbreak of the First World War, he initially served as a platoon leader in his regiment. From 18 August 1914, he was the regimental adjutant. On 5 January 1916, he was transferred as adjutant to the staff of Army Group Prince Leopold of Bavaria. From 1 June to 14 July 1917, he was seconded to an anti-aircraft training course in Lille, followed by another course in Valenciennes. On 1 August 1917, he returned to the front as battery commander of Heavy Anti-Aircraft Battery 149. From 1 April 1918, he served in Brussels, before being transferred to the replacement detachment of his parent regiment on 15 December 1918.

From 15 January 1919, he was battery commander in the 1st East Prussian Field Artillery Regiment No. 16 (presumably with the Grenzschutz Ost). On 1 October 1919, he was transferred to the Preliminary Reichswehr and became battery commander in the 1st Artillery Regiment. From 1 April 1920 to 30 September 1922, Feyerabend served at the Cavalry School in Hanover. As a captain, he then briefly joined the staff of the 1st (Prussian) Artillery Regiment in Königsberg, before heading the training battalion of his regiment from 1 November 1922 to 31 March 1927. From 1 April 1927, he was again seconded to the Cavalry School to prepare intensively for the Olympic Games.

From 1 February 1929, he was a riding instructor and squadron commander at the Infantry School in Dresden. On 1 July 1933, he took command of the disguised motorized transport battalion (Fahrabteilung) in Königsberg. On 1 April 1935, he was transferred from the Heer to the Luftwaffe with a rank of Major. His battalion was now reclassified as I. Battalion/Flak-Regiment 1. On 1 October 1936, he was appointed commander of the new Flak-Regiment 25 in Ludwigsburg. On 1 November 1937, he was appointed Higher Flak Artillery Leader 1 in Königsberg.

From 26 September 1938, he was commander of the Leipzig Air Defense Area, renamed Air Defense Area 2 on 1 July 1939. On 20 April 1939, he had been promoted to the rank of Generalmajor. On 10 April 1940, he was appointed commander of the German air defense forces in Norway. On 24 July 1941, he again took command of Air Defense Area 2. From 1 September 1941, he was commander of the 2nd Flak Division in Leipzig.

When the 2nd Flak Division was sent to the Eastern Front and replaced in its garrison of Leipzig by the creation of the 14th Flak Division on 3 February 1942, Feyerabend took command of that division and remained in charge until 30 November 1942 when he was honorably discharged from the Wehrmacht, Rudolf Schulze took over the division on 1 December 1942.

On 1 February 1945, Generalleutnant Feyerabend was partially reactivated and held the deputy command of the 27th Flak Division, which had retreated from Königsberg to West Prussia and then to Stettin. It is presumed he represented Generalleutnant Walter von Hippel who had officially been appointed commander, but remained Flak Leader of the 10th Army in Italy. On 2 May 1945, Generalmajor Oskar Vorbrugg took over command of the division which capitulated in Schwerin on 4 May 1945.

== Promotions ==
- 1 March 1910 Leutnant (2nd Lieutenant) without Patent
  - 1 June 1910 received Patent
- 18 December 1915 Oberleutnant (1st Lieutenant)
- 1 February 1922 Hauptmann (Captain)
- 1 September 1932 Major
  - 1 April 1935 Major (Luftwaffe)
- 1 June 1935 Oberstleutnant (Lieutenant Colonel)
- 1 August 1937 Oberst (Colonel)
- 20 April 1939 Generalmajor (Major General) with effect and Rank Seniority (RDA) from 1 April 1939
- 1 April 1941 Generalleutnant (Lieutenant General)

== Awards and decorations (excerpt) ==
- Iron Cross (1914), 2nd and 1st Class
- Military Merit Order (Bavaria), 4th Class with Swords (BMV4X/BM4X)
- Military Merit Cross (Austria-Hungary), 3rd Class with the War Decoration (ÖM3K)
- Wound Badge (1918) in Black
- Honour Cross of the World War 1914/1918 with Swords
- Wehrmacht Long Service Award, 4th to 1st Class
- Repetition Clasp 1939 to the Iron Cross 1914, 2nd Class

Military offices
Preceded by none	Commander of 2nd Flak Division; July 1938 – 10 April 1940	Succeeded by Heinrich Burchard
Preceded by Heinrich Burchard	Commander of 2nd Flak Division; 1 July – 31 August 1941	Succeeded by Oskar Bertram
Preceded by Oskar Bertram	Commander of 2nd Flak Division; 12 January – 3 February 1942	Succeeded by Heino von Rantzau
Preceded by None	Commander of 14th Flak Division; 3 February – 1 December 1942	Succeeded by Rudolf Schulze
Preceded by None	Commander of 27th Flak Division; April 1945 – 2 May 1945	Succeeded by Oskar Vorbrugg
