= Walther von Axthelm =

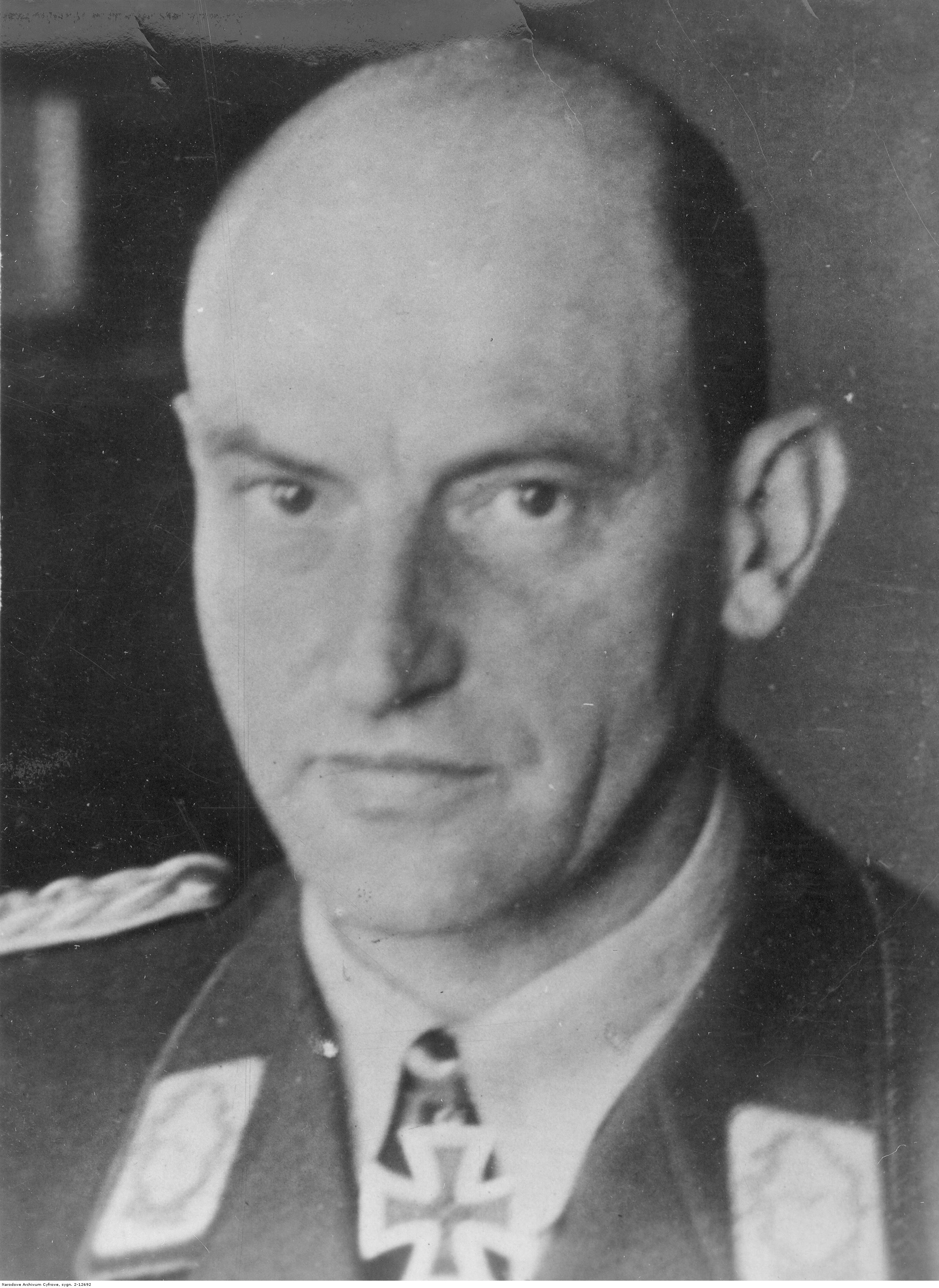
- Born: 23 December 1893; Hersbruck
- Died: 6 January 1972 (aged 78); Traunstein
- Military career
- Allegiance: German Empire; Weimar Republic; Nazi Germany
- Branch: Bavarian Army; Reichsheer; Luftwaffe
- Service years: 1913–1945
- Rank: General der Flakartillerie
- Commands: Fallschirm-Panzer Division 1 Hermann Göring; I. Flakkorps
- Conflicts: World War II
- Awards: Knight's Cross of the Iron Cross

Walther Moritz Heinrich Wolfgang von Axthelm (23 December 1893 – 6 January 1972) was a German general (General der Flakartillerie) in the Luftwaffe during World War II who commanded the I Flak Corps. He was a recipient of the Knight's Cross of the Iron Cross of Nazi Germany. Axthelm served with the Ministry of Aviation (Reichsluftfahrtministerium) from 12 January 1942 to the end of March 1945, holding the position of General der Flakwaffe (Inspector of Anti-Aircraft Artillery). Axthelm surrendered to American troops in 1945 and was interned until 1947.

== Awards and decorations ==
- Knight's Cross of the Iron Cross on 4 September 1941 as Generalmajor and commander of the I. Flak-Korps

Military offices
Preceded by Oberstleutnant der Landespolizei Friedrich Wilhelm Jakoby	Commander of Fallschirm-Panzer Division 1 Hermann Göring; 13 August 1936 – 31 May 1940	Succeeded by Oberst Paul Conrath
Preceded by Generaloberst Hubert Weise	Commander of I Flak Corps; 1 April 1941 – 20 December 1941	Succeeded by General der Flakartillerie Richard Reimann
Preceded by —	General der Flakwaffe; 12 January 1942 – 31 March 1945	Succeeded by General der Flakartillerie Wolfgang Pickert
Preceded by General der Flakartillerie Richard Reimann	Commander of I Flak Corps; 2 May 1945 – 8 May 1945	Succeeded by None
