= Flak division =

In the Luftwaffe of Nazi Germany during World War II, a Flak division (German: Flak-Division) was a division-sized military formation that was officially tasked with the conduct of anti-aircraft warfare, often against the Allied strategic bombing campaigns.

== History ==
German anti-aircraft forces (dubbed Flak, an abbreviation of Flugzeugabwehrkanone, '[anti-]aircraft defense cannon') had been organized in the years 1939 and 1940 into Flak Detachments (Flak-Abteilungen), some of which were mobilized for the Battle of France and placed into the newly formed Flak Corps (Flakkorps), I Flak Corps and II Flak Corps, which were attached to Army Group A, responsible for the central sector, and Army Group B, responsible for the northern sector, respectively.

Besides the Flak Corps and the Flak Detachments, air defense in the German homeland was handled by the Air Defense Commands (Luftverteidigungskommandos), of which 6 had been formed by the beginning of war in September 1939 (Berlin, Leipzig, Hamburg, Düsseldorf, Frankfurt/Main, Hanover), which were joined by 5 more throughout the years of 1940 and 1941 (Cologne, German-occupied Denmark, German-occupied France, Romanian oilfields, Fortress Flak).

These eleven air defense commands were collectively renamed on 1 September 1941 to become the 1st through 11th Flak Divisions. For instance, Air Defense Command No. 1 Berlin became the 1st Flak Division. The Flak Divisions were usually in charge of several Flak Regiments, which might also be dubbed "Flak Groups" (Flakgruppen) in the context of the defense of major cities. For example, the 16th Flak Regiment of 3rd Flak Division in Hamburg was alternatively dubbed "Flak Group Hamburg South".

In summer of 1942, the German casualties on the Eastern Front forced military reorganizations. The field armies of the Heer had previously been supported by Luftwaffe commands dubbed Koluft ("Commanders of the Aerial Forces"), but these staffs were now dissolved. Whereas the home defense had generally been organized by the "Flak Divisions", the two "Flak Corps" had served on the front, without major overlaps between the two. Now, Flak Divisions were also inserted on the frontline, where the flak guns were used not just for anti-aircraft fire, but also to support ground-level combat, notably against enemy armored vehicles. The 12th Flak Division was the first such new mobile Flak division to see action, participating in the battles outside of Moscow in early 1942. Several of the experienced Flak Divisions at home were now to be freed up for frontline action through the formation of new units. In this way, the 2nd Flak Division was sent to the front and replaced by the 14th Flak Division, the 9th Flak Division was mobilized and replaced by the new 13th Flak Division, the 15th Flak Division freed up the 10th Flak Division in Romania, and the 16th Flak Division was formed to free up the 6th Flak Division in German-occupied Belgium. The 2nd, 6th, 9th and 10th divisions were all deployed to the Eastern Front to assist against the counteroffensives by the Red Army. Additionally, the 15th Flak Division, 17th Flak Division and 18th Flak Division were all newly formed and deployed to the Eastern Front as well.

In August 1942, the 19th Flak Division was created from the 7th Flak Brigade in Sicily to assist Panzer Army Africa. Additionally, the 20th Flak Division was assembled to assist the 5th Panzer Army. Both divisions were soon destroyed in the Axis surrender at the end of the Tunisian campaign in May 1943. Additionally, the 9th Flak Division on the Eastern Front was destroyed in the Battle of Stalingrad.

A new 19th Flak Division was formed and deployed to German-occupied Greece in 1943. Likewise, a new 20th Flak Division was sent to German-occupied Yugoslavia. The 21st Flak Division was newly created (from the 6th Flak Brigade) to replace the 5th Flak Division, which was thus freed up to be deployed to Romania. Other new creations of the year 1943 also included the 22nd Flak Division for the Ruhr area, the 23rd Flak Division for the Eastern Front (formed from the abortive 22nd Luftwaffe Field Division) and, in December 1943, the 24th Flak Division in Vienna, formed through the expansion of the 16th Flak Brigade.

The 25th Flak Division was formed in April 1944 on the Italian front by the former 17th Flak Brigade. The 4th Flak Brigade in Munich was expanded in May 1944 to become the 26th Flak Division, bringing the total number of flak divisions at the point of Operation Bagration and Operation Overlord in June 1944 to 26.

The rapid Allied advances of June and July 1944 caused panicked reorganizations. The 11th Flak Division in France was upgraded to become III Flak Corps and replaced in September 1944 by a new 11th Flak Division, formed from 15th Flak Brigade. More and more Flak Brigades were now nominally upgraded to become Flak Divisions, resulting in the creation of 27th Flak Division from 11th Flak Brigade in East Prussia in September, the creation of 28th Flak Division from 9th Flak Brigade in Stuttgart in October, the creation of 29th Flak Division in Oslo (German-occupied Norway) from 14th Flak Brigade on 27 February 1945, and the 30th Flak Division, also known as "30th Railway Flak Division", in Berlin in the final weeks of the war, responsible for all railway anti-aircraft units in Germany.

== Organization ==
Although the German military often adhered to an order of battle in which divisions were subordinate to corps and brigades to divisions, this was not the case with Flak Divisions: Flak Divisions were only rarely part of one of the Flak Corps, and Flak Brigades were only rarely placed under the supervision of a Flak Division.

== List of Flak and Flaklight divisions ==
- 1st Flak Division
- 2nd Flak Division
- 3rd Flak Division
- 4th Flak Division
- 5th Flak Division
- 6th Flak Division
- 7th Flak Division
- 8th Flak Division
- 9th Flak Division
- 10th Flak Division
- 11th Flak Division
- 12th Flak Division
- 13th Flak Division
- 14th Flak Division
- 15th Flak Division
- 16th Flak Division
- 17th Flak Division
- 18th Flak Division
- 19th Flak Division
- 20th Flak Division
- 21st Flak Division
- 22nd Flak Division
- 23rd Flak Division
- 24th Flak Division
- 25th Flak Division
- 26th Flak Division
- 27th Flak Division
- 28th Flak Division
- 29th Flak Division
- 30th Flak Division
- 31st Flak Division
- 1st Flaklight Division
- 2nd Flaklight Division
