= 5th Flak Division =

5th Flak Division (W) 5th Flak Division (5th) Air Defense Command West
- German: 5. Flak-Division (W); Flak-Division 5 Luftverteidigungs-Kommando (Nr. 5) West
- Active: 1 July 1938 – May 1945
- Country: Nazi Germany
- Branch: Luftwaffe
- Type: Flak
- Role: Anti-aircraft warfare
- Size: Division
- Garrison/HQ: Frankfurt; Darmstadt
- Engagements: Bombing of Frankfurt in World War II; Bombing of Romania in World War II; Operation Tidal Wave; Operation Crossbow

Commanders
- Notable commanders: Job Odebrecht; Georg Neuffer

The 5th Flak Division (German: Flak-Division 5) was a Flak division of the Luftwaffe of Nazi Germany during World War II.

== History ==
=== Air Defense Command West ===
On 1 June 1938, the Air Defense Command West (Luftverteidigungskommando West) was established in Frankfurt to coordinate anti-aircraft warfare measures along the Westwall (Allied parlance: "Siegfried Line"). When the air defense commands were numbered, Air Defense Command West received the number 5. It was designated to defend the Koblenz—Mannheim—Kassel area, then redeployed to Darmstadt and adjusted to defend the Frankfurt—Mannheim—Saarbrücken area. The initial head of the staff was Karl Kitzinger, who was succeeded by Job Odebrecht on 15 October 1939, by Wilhelm von Stubenrauch on 5 October 1940 and by Kurt Menzel on 5 May 1941.

=== 5th Flak Division ===
On 1 September 1941, the 5th Air Defense Command was designated "5th Flak Division". At this time, it contained the Flak Regiments 29 and 49, the Flak Searchlight Regiments 109 and 119, and the 5th Air Signal Battalion. On 18 April 1942, Georg Neuffer took command of the division; he was replaced by Julius Kuderna on 13 November 1942. Kuderna remained in charge until September 1944, though he was briefly interrupted by a tenure by Adolf Wolf that started on 27 November 1942 and ended in early December.

In December 1942, the division was sent to the Ploiești area in Romania, where the 10th Flak Division had previously served. A major United States Army Air Forces attack against Ploiești ("Operation Tidal Wave") took place on 1 August 1943. On 3 August 1943, senior German and Romanian leaders in Romania held a joint conference following the major air raid by the USAAF, which Kuderna attended.

After a brief stay on the Italian theater in 1943, the 5th Flak Division returned to Romania in 1944.

The 5th Flak Division was the primary anti-aircraft formation on the ground that opposed the USAAF air raid against Ploiești on 5 April 1944. It did so armed with 48 heavy flak batteries (mostly German-made, though with Romanian and Bulgarian support), over 40 medium and light flak batteries, and eight searchlight batteries. As of 15 August 1944, the 5th Flak Division was part of Luftflotte 4, along with 1st Air Corps and 15th Flak Division.

Following the 1944 Romanian coup d'état on 23 August 1944, desperate orders were given out around midnight by Adolf Hitler and the Wehrmacht high command to available German forces to crush the putschists. The German force, under the initial overall command of Alfred Gerstenberg, who happened to be besieged by Romanian troops and thus trapped inside the German embassy in Bucharest, along with Erik Hansen and German ambassador Manfred von Killinger, also included the 5th Flak Division. Due to Gerstenberg's state of siege, command over the German intervention force was passed instead to Horst Hoffmeyer of the Waffen-SS. Hoffmeyer soon sent out the vanguard of the 5th Flak Division from Ploiești. The division was assigned to crush the coup in Bucharest, an operation that started around 07:30 on 24 August and by 11:30 was reported by Gerstenberg to have run into stiff resistance, leading to German requests to urgently redeploy German infantry from the front to Bucharest. By 26 August, elements of the division were in combat at Ploiești against Romanian tanks and were eventually encircled. On 29 August, the 5th Flak Division reported the loss of Ploiești at 14:30. The attempts by the nearby Kampfgruppe Stahel formation under Rainer Stahel to reach the 5th Flak Division (in which case Stahel was to take command of all remaining troops, including 5th Flak Division) failed.

In late August 1944, the 5th Flak Division was annihilated in the Ploiești area. The remnants of the division surrendered to the Red Army on 31 August 1944, though some remnants managed to join the 15th Flak Division. Both the divisional commander Julius Kuderna and his operational chief Hans-Joachim Schulz were captured. The division's surrender was not reported to its superior formation, which laconically noted the continued absence of reports from Kampfgruppe Stahel as well as 5th Flak Division for several days in early September 1944.

=== 5th Flak Division (W) ===
A new 5th Flak Division, then under the title 5th Flak Division (W) (5. Flakdivision (W)), was recreated on 1 November 1944 in Meschede to coordinate V-1 flying bomb attacks on the Western Front. The divisional commander of this new V-1 staff was Walter Kathmann. It contained the Flak Regiment 155 (W) and the Flak Regiment 255 (W). In the final days of the war, the 5th Flak Division was in the South Hamburg—Bad Segeberg area. The final commander was Max Wachtel, who had assumed command on 6 February 1945.
