= 8th Flak Division =

8th Flak Division 8th Air Defense Command Air Defense Command Denmark
- German: Flak-Division 8 Luftverteidigungs-Kommando Nr. 8 Luftverteidigungs-Kommando Dänemark
- Active: May 1940 – 1945
- Country: Nazi Germany
- Branch: Luftwaffe
- Type: Flak
- Role: Anti-aircraft warfare
- Size: Division
- Garrison/HQ: Hanover; Bremen
- Engagements: Bombing of Bremen in World War II

Commanders
- Notable commanders: Alexander Kolb

The 8th Flak Division (German: Flak-Division 8) was a Flak division of the Luftwaffe of Nazi Germany during World War II.

== History ==
In May 1940, the "Air Defense Command Denmark" (Luftverteidigungs-Kommando Dänemark) staff was formed in German-occupied Denmark, which had been seized by Wehrmacht forces in Operation Weserübung in April 1940. The initial head of the staff was Hans-Jürgen von Witzendorff, succeeded soon after on 4 June 1940 by Alexander Kolb. This staff was designated "8th Air Defense Command" (Luftverteidigungs-Kommando Nr. 8) in June 1940 and sent to Hanover. Subsequently, it was deployed to the city of Bremen on 5 June 1941. Here, the 8th Flak Division was part of Luftgau XI, which by February 1944 also would contain 3rd Flak Division (Hamburg), 8th Flak Brigade (Wismar) and 15th Flak Brigade (Hanover).

Its subordinate formations included the Flak Regiment 56 as well as the Flak Searchlight Regiment 56. The Flak Regiment 26 was "Flak Group Bremen North", Flak Regiment 89 was "Flak Group Bremen Center", Flak Regiment 13 was "Flak Group Bremen South", Flak Searchlight Regiment 160 was "Flak Searchlight Group Bremen".

On 30 June 1941, Kurt Wagner took command of the staff (from 1 September: the division). He held this office until 4 December 1944, when he was succeeded by Max Schaller.

On 1 September 1941, 8th Air Defense Command, then headquartered at Bremen-Oberneuland, was redesignated "8th Flak Division". It was responsible for the defense of the Weser—Ems area. As part of its duties as a flak division, the formation also received auxiliaries (Luftwaffenhelfer), including underage students.

Around January 1945, the city of Bremen possessed around 300 flak batteries.

Near the end of the war, the 8th Flak Division was, along with 3rd Flak Division, placed under the supervision of the VI Flak Corps, which had been formed on 10 February 1945 in the northern sector of the Western Front.
