= Gotthard Frantz =

- Born: 5 May 1888
- Died: 21 January 1973 (aged 84)
- Military career
- Allegiance: Nazi Germany
- Branch: Luftwaffe
- Service years: 1907–1921; 1935–1945
- Rank: Generalleutnant
- Commands: 12th Flak Division; 19th Flak Division
- Conflicts: World War II
- Awards: Knight's Cross of the Iron Cross

Gotthard Frantz (5 May 1888 – 21 January 1973) was a general in the Luftwaffe of Nazi Germany during World War II. He was a recipient of the Knight's Cross of the Iron Cross.

== Awards ==
- Knight's Cross of the Iron Cross on 18 May 1943 as Generalleutnant and commander of 19th Flak Division

Military offices
Preceded by Generalleutnant Rudolf Eibenstein	Commander of 12th Flak Division; 1 December 1941 – 21 December 1942	Succeeded by Generalleutnant Ernst Buffa
Preceded by General der Flakartillerie Dipl.Ing. Heinrich Burchard	Commander of 19th Flak Division; 21 December 1942 – 13 May 1943	Succeeded by Generalmajor Paul Pavel
