= Hubert Weise =

Nazi general (1884–1950)

- Weise as a Generalleutnant
- Born: 22 December 1884; Erfurt, German Empire
- Died: 14 February 1950 (aged 65); Bad Kohlgrub, West Germany
- Military career
- Allegiance: German Empire; Weimar Republic; Nazi Germany
- Branch: Luftwaffe
- Service years: 1904–1945
- Rank: Generaloberst
- Commands: I Flak Corps
- Conflicts: World War I; World War II; Battle of France; Defense of the Reich; Bombing of Peenemünde
- Awards: Knight's Cross of the Iron Cross

Hubert Weise (22 December 1884 – 14 February 1950) was a German general (Generaloberst) in the Luftwaffe during World War II. He was a recipient of the Knight's Cross of the Iron Cross of Nazi Germany. Weise surrendered to the Allied troops in May 1945 and was released in 1947.

== Awards and decorations ==
- German Cross in Gold on 14 January 1944 as Generaloberst and former Luftwaffen-Befehlshaber Mitte (Luftwaffe Commander Central)
- Knight's Cross of the Iron Cross on 24 June 1940 as General der Flakartillerie and commander of I Flak Corps

Military offices
Preceded by None	Commander of I Flak Corps; 3 October 1939 - 23 March 1941	Succeeded by General der Flakartillerie Walther von Axthelm
Preceded by None	Commander of Luftwaffen-Befehlshaber Mitte; 24 March 1941 - 23 December 1943	Succeeded by Generaloberst Hans-Jürgen Stumpff
