= Richard Reimann =

- Born: 2 November 1892; Minden, German Empire
- Died: 28 October 1970 (aged 77); Rottach-Egern, West Germany
- Military career
- Allegiance: German Empire (to 1918); Weimar Republic (to 1933); Nazi Germany
- Branch: Prussian Army (1911–1918); Reichsheer (1918–1933); Army (1933–1935); Luftwaffe (1935–1945)
- Service years: 1911–1945
- Rank: General der Flakartillerie
- Commands: 18. Flak-Division; I Flak Corps
- Conflicts: World War I World War II
- Awards: Knight's Cross of the Iron Cross

Richard Reimann (2 November 1892 – 28 October 1970) was a General der Flakartillerie in the Luftwaffe during World War II. He was a recipient of the Knight's Cross of the Iron Cross, awarded by the Germany military to recognize successful military leadership.

Reimann surrendered to the American forces on 8 May 1945 and was later handed over to Soviet forces. Convicted as a war criminal in the Soviet Union, he was held until 1955.

== Awards and decorations ==
- German Cross in Gold (1 August 1942)
- Knight's Cross of the Iron Cross on 3 April 1943 as Generalmajor and commander of 18th Flak Division

Military offices
Preceded by General der Flakartillerie Walther von Axthelm	Commander of I Flak Corps; 20 December 1941 - 2 April 1942	Succeeded by Generaloberst Otto Dessloch
Preceded by None	Commander of 18th Flak Division; 10 April 1942 - 9 March 1943	Succeeded by Generalleutnant Prinz Heinrich Reuss
Preceded by Generaloberst Otto Dessloch	Commander of I Flak Corps; June 1943 - 2 May 1945	Succeeded by General der Flakartillerie Walther von Axthelm
