= Hermann Lichtenberger =

Hermann Lichtenberger may refer to:

- Hermann Lichtenberger (general)
- Hermann Lichtenberger (theologian)
