= General Anton =

General Anton may refer to:

- Constantin Anton (1894–1993), Romanian Armed Forces brigadier general
- Prince Karl Anton of Hohenzollern (1868–1919), Prussian Army lieutenant general
- Paul II Anton, Prince Esterházy (1711–1762), Holy Roman Empire general
- Werner Anton (1895–1948), German Luftwaffe lieutenant general
