= Heino von Rantzau =

- Born: 8 March 1894; Karlsruhe, German Empire
- Died: 2 November 1946 (aged 52); Allendorf, Allied-occupied Germany
- Military career
- Allegiance: German Empire (to 1918); Weimar Republic (to 1920); Nazi Germany
- Branch: Prussian Army (1913–1918); Reichsheer (1918–1933); Army (1933–1935); Luftwaffe (1935–1945)
- Service years: 1913–1945
- Rank: Generalleutnant
- Commands: 2nd Flak Division; III Flak Corps
- Conflicts: World War I World War II: Battle of France; Siege of Leningrad; Defense of the Reich; Ruhr Pocket
- Awards: Knight's Cross of the Iron Cross

Heino von Rantzau (8 March 1894 – 2 November 1946) was a highly decorated Generalleutnant in the Luftwaffe during World War II. He was also a recipient of the Knight's Cross of the Iron Cross. Heino von Rantzau was captured by American troops in April 1945, and died in captivity on 2 November 1946.

== Awards and decorations ==
- Iron Cross (1914)
  - 2nd Class
  - 1st Class
- Wound Badge (1914)
  - in Black
- Hanseatic Cross of Hamburg
- Military Merit Cross, 1st and 2nd class (Mecklenburg-Schwerin)
- Honour Cross of the World War 1914/1918
- Iron Cross (1939)
  - 2nd Class (17 May 1940)
  - 1st Class (28 July 1940)
- Eastern Front Medal
- Anti-Aircraft Flak Battle Badge
- German Cross in Gold (24 December 1942)
- Knight's Cross of the Iron Cross on 29 August 1943 as Generalleutnant and commander of 2. Flak-Division (mot.)

Military offices
Preceded by Generalleutnant Walter Feyerabend	Commander of 2. Flak-Division (mot.); 23 January 1942 – 1 October 1943	Succeeded by Generalleutnant Alfons Luczny
Preceded by General der Flakartillerie Wolfgang Pickert	Commander of III. Flakkorps; 20 March 1945 – 18 April 1945	Succeeded by None
