= Johannes Hintz =

German general (1898–1944)

- Born: 1 October 1898
- Died: 21 May 1944 (aged 45); Paris
- Military career
- Allegiance: Nazi Germany
- Branch: Luftwaffe
- Rank: Generalleutnant (Posthumously)
- Commands: 4th Flak Division; III Flak Corps
- Conflicts: World War II
- Awards: Knight's Cross of the Iron Cross

Johannes Hintz (1 October 1898 – 21 May 1944) was a German general during World War II. He was also a recipient of the Knight's Cross of the Iron Cross of Nazi Germany. Hintz was injured in a car-accident on 14 May 1944 in Paris and died on 21 May 1944. He was posthumously promoted to Generalleutnant.

== Awards and decorations ==
- Knight's Cross of the Iron Cross on 29 July 1940 as Oberstleutnant and commander of Flak-Regiment 101

Military offices
Preceded by General der Flakartillerie Gerhard Hoffmann	Commander of 4th Flak Division; 5 March 1942 – 26 February 1944	Succeeded by Generalleutnant Ludwig Schilffarth
Preceded by None	Commander of III Flak Corps; 26 February 1944 – 14 May 1944	Succeeded by General der Flakartillerie Wolfgang Pickert
