= Capture of Hamburg =

Battle in World War II

- Part of the Western Allied invasion of Germany in the Western Front of the European theatre of World War II
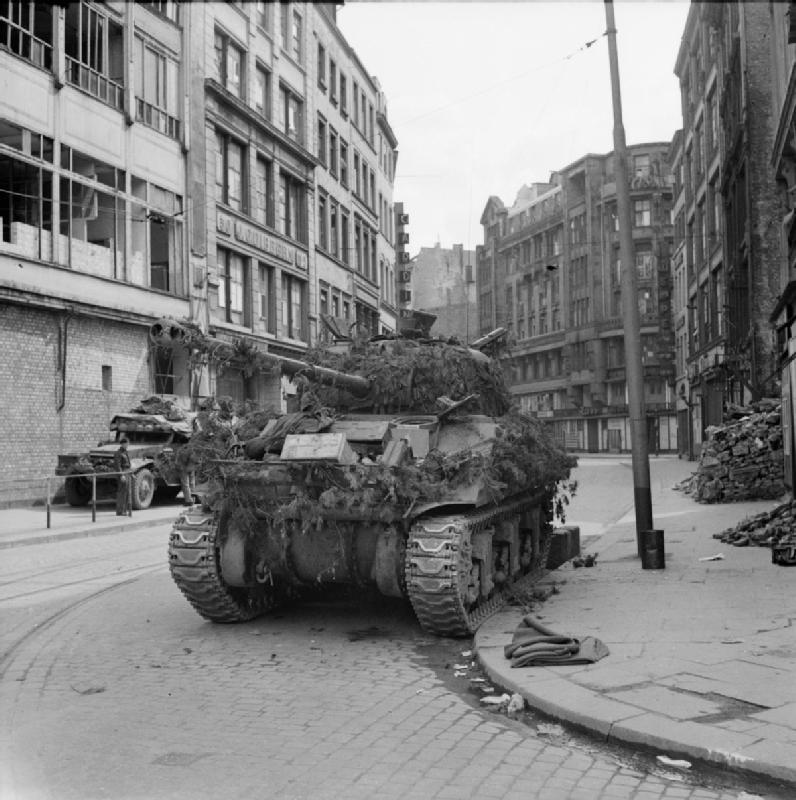
- A British Sherman Firefly tank in the city centre after the battle.
Date	18 April – 3 May 1945
Location	Hamburg, Germany
Result	British victory
Territorial changes	Occupation of Hamburg in Northern Germany by Allied forces

Belligerents
United Kingdom: Newfoundland	Germany

Commanders and leaders
Miles Dempsey; Evelyn Barker; Lewis Lyne	Kurt Student; Alwin Wolz (POW)

Units involved
VIII Corps (7th Armoured Division); XII Corps (elements)	1st Parachute Army (elements)

Strength
3 divisions	2 divisions (understrength) (~3,000 troops)

The Capture of Hamburg was one of the last battles of the Western Front of the Second World War, where the remaining troops of the German 1st Parachute Army fought the British XII Corps in Lower Saxony for the control of Hamburg, Germany, between 18 April and 3 May 1945. British troops were met with fierce resistance when they advanced toward the city as Hamburg was the last remaining pocket of resistance in the north. When the British troops reached the outskirts of Hamburg, Germany eventually surrendered the city. Once the British had captured the city, they continued their advance north-east and sealed off the remnants of the 1st Parachute Army and Army Group Northwest in the Jutland peninsula.

== Background ==
After the Western Allies crossed the Rhine River, the German armies in the west began to fall apart. Army Group B, under the command of Walter Model, was the last effective German defence in the west. The Army Group, consisting of three armies, was encircled and captured by the 1st and 9th American Armies. After the defeat of Army Group B, the Germans were only able to organize resistance in a few cities and were not able to communicate with each other very well. The Allied armies started a general advance across Germany, with the Americans pushing the centre and the British holding the north. The main British thrust came from the British Second Army, under the command of Lieutenant General Miles C. Dempsey.

The objective of the army was to advance across northern Germany and push on to Berlin. The British came across little resistance compared with the Americans further south and advanced at a steady and fast pace. The 1st Parachute Army and the new Army Group Northwest were the last German forces in the north. As the British continued their advance, Oberkommando der Wehrmacht, the German high command in Berlin, which was under siege by the Red Army, refused to send reinforcements. The Germans managed to resist the British in Bremen for a week; the surviving troops retreated to the Jutland peninsula. The last remaining defence was of the city of Hamburg and the Germans sought to make their stand there. After capturing Soltau, the 7th Armoured Division of the VIII Corps was poised to assault the city.

== Battle ==
=== Preliminary moves ===
The British advance to Hamburg was spearheaded by the 7th Armoured Division, attacking Harburg and advancing to the River Elbe across from Hamburg, with the 15th (Scottish) Infantry Division assaulting the town of Uelzen to the south of the city. Elements of the XII Corps attacked Hamburg itself from the northwest. On their way to Harburg, the 7th Division captured Welle and Tostedt on 18 April and advanced into Hollenstedt the next day. By this time, the Germans had built up defences in Harburg as the British moved closer. On 20 April, the 7th Division captured Daerstorf, 13 km (8 mi) west of the city. The RHA Forward Observation Officers (FOOs), reached the Elbe and began to direct artillery fire upon troops and trains on the other side of the river. On the same day, the British 131st Infantry Brigade took Vahrendorf just two miles south of Harburg. The 7th Division halted the advance for five days just short of Hamburg; it set up a perimeter and prepared for its assault on the city. On 26 April, the 12th SS Reinforcement Regiment (12. SS-Verstärkungsregiment), supported by Hitler Youth and assorted Hamburg sailors and policemen, counter-attacked at Vahrendorf. They were supported by 88 mm guns and 75 mm howitzers and reached the town centre, but were pushed back once British tanks arrived. The battle continued until the next day, when the Germans retreated back to Harburg, leaving 60 dead and losing 70 men as prisoners.

=== German surrender ===
On 28 April the British began their assault on the city. The 5th Royal Tank Regiment, 9th Durham Light Infantry and 1st Rifle Brigade captured Jesteburg and Hittfeld, reaching the autobahn. Nevertheless, the Germans blew up parts of the autobahn at Hittfeld, slowing the British advance.

As the British advanced on the city, it was clear that the Germans would still not give up. The troops of the 1st Parachute Army were now a mix of a few SS, paratroopers, Volkssturm, along with regular Wehrmacht soldiers, supported by sailors, police, firemen, and Hitler Youth. They were supported by 88 mm guns, which were no longer needed for air defense.

Many German units, including a tank destroyer battalion, a Hungarian SS unit and many Panzerfaust anti-tank troops were also still located in the woods south of Hamburg, as the British had bypassed the area and were now mopping it up. The 53rd (Welsh) Infantry Division, supported by the 1st Royal Tank Regiment assaulted the woods and captured all remaining German troops, a total of 2,000 men.

On 28 April, the 3rd Regiment Royal Horse Artillery began shelling the Phoenix Rubber Works in Hamburg. The shelling eventually brought about a white flag delegation. On 29 April, a deputation from the city came out to discuss surrender. On 1 May, General Alwin Wolz's staff car, under a white flag, approached D Company of the 9th Durham Light Infantry. On 30 April, Adolf Hitler had committed suicide in Berlin and Grand Admiral Karl Dönitz, who was commanding the forces in the north, had ordered Wolz to discuss surrendering the city to the British. Wolz, along with a small German delegation, arrived at Division HQ on 2 May and formally surrendered Hamburg on 3 May. That same afternoon, the 11th Hussars led the 7th Armoured Division into the ruined city.

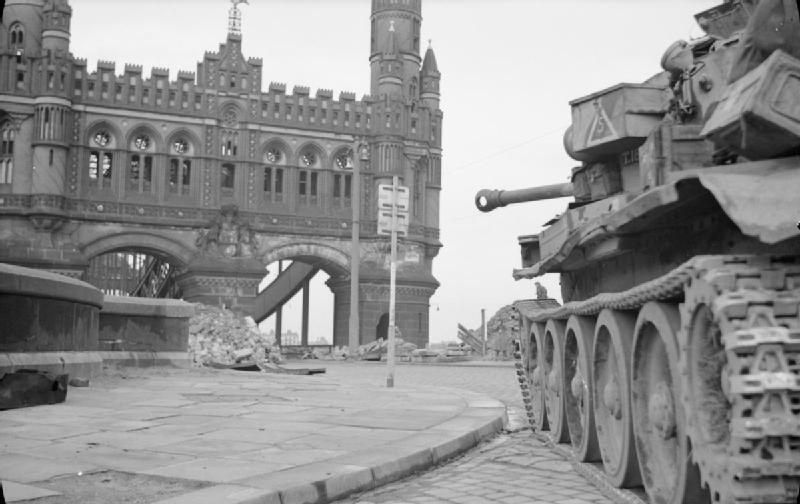
Cromwell tank of 7th Armoured Division, in position by the Neue Elbbrücke in Hamburg on 3 May 1945.

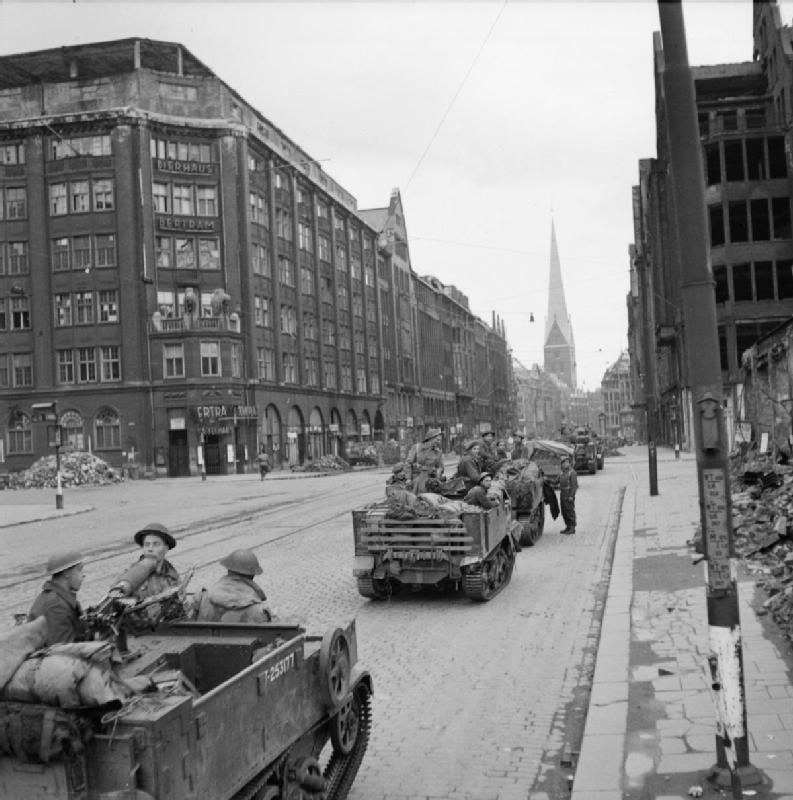
Universal carriers of 1/5th Queen's Regiment, 7th Armoured Division in Hamburg on 3 May 1945.

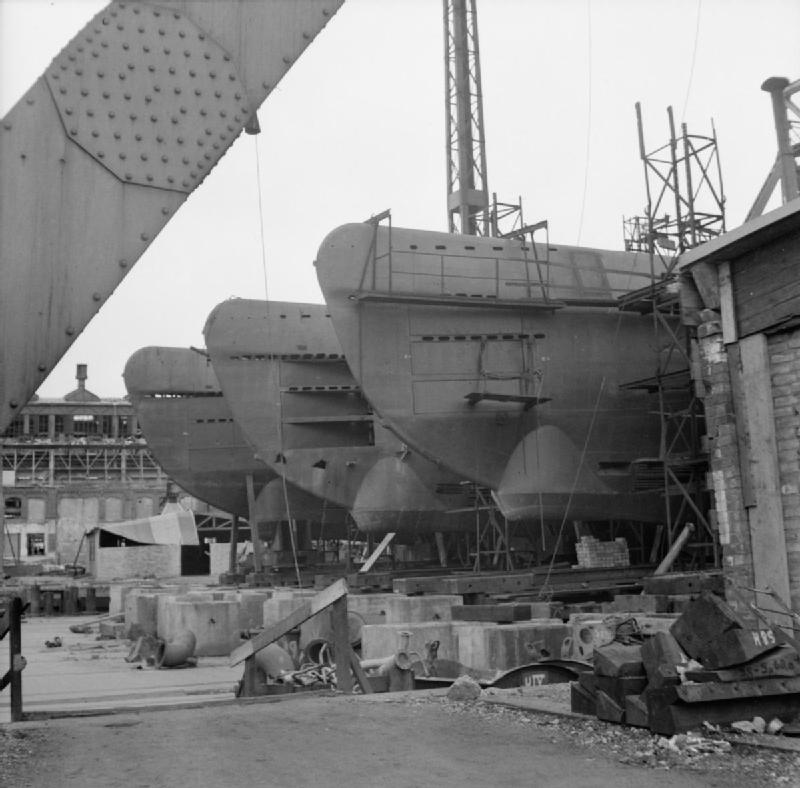
Incomplete German U-boats abandoned at the Blohm and Voss shipyard.

== Aftermath ==
Hamburg was the last remaining defence for the Germans in the north. After the British had captured the city, the surviving troops of the 1st Parachute Army along with Army Group Northwest retreated into the Jutland Peninsula. Most of them retreated to Kiel, where they met soldiers of Army Group Vistula, who were fleeing from the Soviets on the Eastern Front. The 7th Armoured Division advanced unopposed to Lübeck, where news of the German surrender at Lüneburg Heath came on 4 May, followed by the German Instrument of Surrender on 8 May.
