= Alwin Wolz =

- Born: 22 September 1897
- Died: 15 September 1978 (aged 80)
- Military career
- Allegiance: Nazi Germany
- Rank: Generalmajor
- Commands: 3rd Flak Division
- Conflicts: Defense of the Reich; Bombing of Hamburg
- Awards: Knight's Cross of the Iron Cross

Alwin Wolz (22 September 1897 – 15 September 1978) was a general in the Luftwaffe of Nazi Germany during World War II who commanded the 3rd Flak Division. He was a recipient of the Knight's Cross of the Iron Cross.

Wolz commanded the 3rd Flak Division between 1 May 1944 and 2 April 1945.

Wolz was appointed combat commander of Hamburg on 15 April 1945. He surrendered the city to the British 7th Armoured Division on 3 May 1945.

== Awards and decorations ==
- German Cross in Gold (21 August 1942)
- Knight's Cross of the Iron Cross on 4 June 1943 as Oberst and commander of Flak-Regiment 135 (mot.)

Military offices
Preceded by Generalleutnant Walter von Hippel	Commander of 3rd Flak Division; 1 May 1944 – 2 April 1945	Succeeded by Generalmajor Otto Stange
