= Alfons Luczny =

German general and Knight's Cross recipient

- Born: 4 June 1894
- Died: 12 August 1985 (aged 91)
- Military career
- Allegiance: Nazi Germany
- Branch: Luftwaffe
- Rank: Generalleutnant
- Commands: 2nd Flak Division
- Conflicts: World War II
- Awards: Knight's Cross of the Iron Cross

Alfons Luczny (4 June 1894 – 12 August 1985) was a German general in the Luftwaffe during World War II.

Luczny entered the Prussian Army in 1913 and fought in World War I. After the end of the war, he remained in the military until December 1920, when he joined the police force in Upper Silesia. From July 1923 until June 1935, he served with the Schutzpolizei in Oppeln (today, Opole). He was commissioned as a major in the Luftwaffe in June 1935. He fought throughout World War II, achieving the rank of Generalleutnant. He was a recipient of the Knight's Cross of the Iron Cross of Nazi Germany. Luczny surrendered to the American troops in May 1945. He was handed over to Soviet forces and was held as a prisoner of war in the Soviet Union until October 1955.

== Awards and decorations ==
- Knight's Cross of the Iron Cross on 9 June 1944 as Generalleutnant and commander of 2nd Flak Division

Military offices
Preceded by Generalleutnant Heino von Rantzau	Commander of 2nd Flak Division; 1 October 1943 – 15 November 1944	Succeeded by Oberst Fritz Laicher
