= 2nd Flak Division =

2nd Flak Division (2nd) Air Defense Command Leipzig
- German: Flak-Division 2 Luftverteidigungs-Kommando (Nr. 2) Leipzig
- Active: 1 July 1938 – April 1945
- Country: Nazi Germany
- Branch: Luftwaffe
- Type: Anti-aircraft unit
- Role: Anti-aircraft warfare
- Size: Division
- Engagements: Eastern Front; Battle of the Bulge; Ruhr pocket

Commanders
- Notable commanders: Walter Feyerabend; Heinrich Burchard; Heino von Rantzau; Alfons Luczny

The 2nd Flak Division (German: Flak-Division 2) was an anti-aircraft division unit of the Luftwaffe of Nazi Germany during World War II. It was initially deployed as a stationary formation in Leipzig for the defense of the German homeland's air space, but became a mobile division in January 1942 and was deployed to the Eastern Front. Eventually, it was shuffled to the Western Front, where it was destroyed in 1945.

== History ==
On 1 July 1938, the "Air Defense Command Leipzig" (Luftverteidigungs-Kommando Leipzig) staff was assembled in Leipzig. The staff's name received its number on 1 August 1939 and became "2nd Air Defense Command Leipzig" (Luftverteidigungs-Kommando Nr. 2 Leipzig). On 1 September 1941, the name of the formation was changed to 2nd Flak Division (Flak-Division 2). The initial head of the air defense staff was Walter Feyerabend, who commanded the staff and subsequent divisions in three tenures between July 1938 and 3 February 1942, with interruptions by Heinrich Burchard (in command from 10 April 1940 until 1 July 1941) and Oskar Bertram (in command from 1 September 1941 until 12 January 1942).

In January 1942, the 2nd Flak Division was replaced in its stationary defensive task by 14th Flak Division, which had been newly created for just this purpose. The 2nd Flak Division was turned into a mobile division for service in the field. It was sent to the Eastern Front, where it was assigned to support Army Group North. It contained the Flak Regiments 41 (at Luga, air support for the army group rear area), 151 (at Medved, support for 16th Army) and 164 (in support of 18th Army), as well as an air signals company and a divisional supply staff. On 3 February 1942, Feyerabend's third and final tenure as divisional commander ended, and he was replaced by Heino von Rantzau.

In September 1942, the newly inserted 6th Flak Division was deployed to the front. The 2nd Flak Division was subsequently restrained to the army group's rear area. Von Rantzau was replaced by Alfons Luczny on 1 October 1943.

The withdrawal to the Narva river had resulted in numerous damaged formations; the 2nd Flak Division was bolstered with scattered survivors of the heavily battered 9th Luftwaffe Field Division and 10th Luftwaffe Field Division. In February 1944, the 2nd Flak Division was deployed from Luga to Pskov and subsequently to Dorpat. In 1944, the 2nd Flak Division supported the 18th Army with its flak guns, including on ground level against enemy tanks. By 15 June 1944, the division was part of "Coastal Defense Command East" under Army Detachment Narwa.

In September 1944, the 2nd Flak Division was sent to the Western Front, where it was reformed with three Assault Flak Regiments and used in the Battle of the Bulge. On 8 January 1945, the division had a strength of 18 heavy flak batteries and 17 light or medium flak batteries, with the 2 cm Flak counted as light, the 3.7 cm Flak 18/36/37 and 5 cm FlaK 41 counted as medium, and the 8.8 cm Flak 18/36/37/41 as well as any other larger calibers counted as heavy flak. During the Battle of the Bulge, the 2nd Flak Division was involved in numerous friendly fire incidents.

After the Western Allies had beaten back the German counteroffensive, the 2nd Flak Division was in the Eifel mountain range and found itself, in February 1945, in the city of Bonn. In March, the division participated in the Battle of Cologne. Eventually, the 2nd Flak Division was annihilated in the Ruhr pocket in April 1945. The final divisional commander of the war had been a colonel-rank officer named Fritz Laicher, who had held this post since 15 November 1944.

== Noteworthy individuals ==
The 2nd Flak Division was commanded by the following persons:

- Walter Feyerabend (July 1938 – 10 April 1940, 1 July – 31 August 1941, 12 January – 3 February 1942)
- Heinrich Burchard (10 April 1940 – 1 July 1941)
- Oskar Bertram (1 September 1941 – 12 January 1942)
- Heino von Rantzau (3 February 1942 – 1 October 1943)
- Alfons Luczny (1 October 1943 – 15 November 1944)
- Fritz Laicher (after 15 November 1944)
