= General der Flakartillerie =

Luftwaffe branch rank position

General of the Anti-aircraft Artillery General der Flakartillerie
- Collar patch and flying suit insignia

- Luftwaffe shoulder board
- Country: Nazi Germany
- Service branch: Luftwaffe
- Rank: Three-star
- NATO rank code: OF-8
- Non-NATO rank: O-9
- Formation: 1939
- Abolished: 1945
- Next higher rank: Generaloberst
- Next lower rank: Generalleutnant
- Equivalent ranks: See list

General der Flakartillerie (English: General of anti-aircraft artillery) was a General of the branch rank of the Luftwaffe (English: German Air Force) in Nazi Germany. Until the end of World War II in 1945, this particular general officer rank was on three-star level (OF-8), equivalent to a US Lieutenant general.

The "General of the branch" ranks of the Luftwaffe were in 1945:

- General of parachute troops
- General of anti-aircraft artillery
- General of the aviators
- General of air force communications troops
- General of the air force

The rank was equivalent to the General of the branch ranks of the Heer (army) as follows:

Heer

- General of artillery
- General of mountain troops
- General of infantry
- General of cavalry
- General of the communications troops
- General of panzer troops (armoured troops)
- General of engineers
- General of the medical corps
- General of the veterinary corps

junior Rank; Generalleutnant	(German officer rank); General der Flakartillerie	senior Rank; Generaloberst

Other services

The rank was also equivalent to the German three-star ranks:

- Admiral of the Kriegsmarine, equivalent to (US Vice admiral) and
- SS-Obergruppenführer und General der Waffen-SS in the Waffen-SS.

== A ==
- Walther von Axthelm (1893-1972)

== B ==
- Heinrich Burchard (1894-1945)

== D ==
- Otto Deßloch (1889-1977) (later promoted to Generaloberst)

== G ==
- Hugo Grimme (1872-1943)

== H ==
- Alfred Haubold (1887-1969)
- Friedrich Heilingbrunner (1891-1977)
- Friedrich Hirschhauer (1883-1979)
- Gerhard Hoffmann (1887-1969)

== O ==
- Job Odebrecht (1892-1982)

== P ==
- Wolfgang Pickert (1897-1984)

== R ==
- Richard Reimann (1892-1970)
- Otto Wilhelm von Renz (1891-1968)
- Helmut Richter (1891-1977)
- Karl von Roques (1880-1949) (Reentered the Wehrmacht as a General der Infanterie)
- Günther Rüdel (1883-1950) (later promoted to Generaloberst)
- Camillo Ruggera (1885-1947)

== S ==
- August Schmidt (1883-1955)
- Ludwig von Schröder (1884-1941)

== W ==
- Hubert Weise (1884-1950) (later promoted to Generaloberst)
- Eugen Weissmann (1892-1951)

== Z ==
- Emil Zenetti (1883-1945)

== See also ==
- General (Germany)
