= Job Odebrecht =

German general (1892–1982)

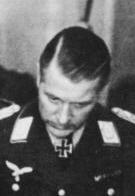
- Born: 25 February 1892
- Died: 20 November 1982 (aged 90)
- Military career
- Allegiance: German Empire; Nazi Germany
- Branch: Imperial German Navy; Reichsmarine; Luftwaffe
- Service years: 1909–20; 1935–45
- Rank: General der Flakartillerie
- Commands: 6th Flak Division; III Luftwaffe Field Corps; II Flak Corps
- Conflicts: World War I World War II
- Awards: Knight's Cross of the Iron Cross

Job Odebrecht (25 February 1892 – 20 November 1982) was a German general during World War II. He was also a recipient of the Knight's Cross of the Iron Cross of Nazi Germany.

Odebrecht entered the German navy as an officer cadet in 1909 and was commissioned in 1912. After serving on flotilla craft and capital ships, he was assigned to East Africa. He commanded a company of naval troops there when World War I broke out, and was captured by the Belgians in 1916, when German East Africa fell to the Allies.

During the inter-war period, he served as a policeman, attaining the rank of major. He joined the German air force in 1935, and was promoted to Lt. Col at the end of that year. His commands included the 1st bn., 11th flak rgt. (1936), 71st flak bn. (1937), 1st bn., 34th flak rgt. (1938), 25th flak rgt. (1938), 8th flak rgt. (1939), 5th Luftwaffe defense command (1940), 6th Luftwaffe Defense Command (1941).

He was promoted to General der Flakartillerie on 1 December 1942 and commanded the 6th Flak Division (1942), 21st Luftwaffe Field Division (1942), III Luftwaffe Field Corps (1943) and II Flak Corps (1944–45).

== Awards and decorations ==
- Knight's Cross of the Iron Cross on 5 September 1944 as General der Flakartillerie and commanding general of the II. Flakkorps (motorized)

Military offices
Preceded by Unknown	Commander of 6th Flak Division; 1 September 1941 – 1 September 1942	Succeeded by Generalleutnant Werner Anton
Preceded by Generaloberst Otto Deßloch	Commander of II Flak Corps; 1 October 1943 – 8 May 1945	Succeeded by None
