= 4th Flak Division =

Nazi German Military unit during WW II

4th Flak Division (4th) Air Defense Command Düsseldorf Air Defense Command Essen
- German: Flak-Division 4 Luftverteidigungs-Kommando (Nr. 4) Düsseldorf; Luftverteidigungs-Kommando Essen
- Active: 1 July 1938 – 18 April 1945
- Country: Nazi Germany
- Branch: Luftwaffe
- Type: Flak
- Role: Anti-aircraft warfare
- Size: Division
- Engagements: Bombing of Duisburg in World War II; Battle of the Ruhr; Western Front; Ruhr pocket

Commanders
- Notable commanders: Johannes Hintz

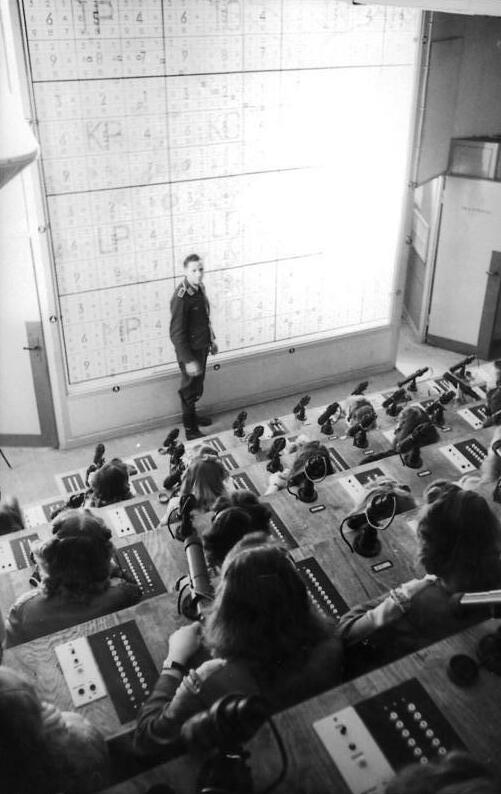
4th Flak division

The 4th Flak Division (German: Flak-Division 4) was a Flak division of the Luftwaffe of Nazi Germany during World War II.

== History ==
On 1 July 1938, the "Air Defense Command Essen" (Luftverteidigungskommando Essen) staff was formed, later redesignated "Air Defense Command Düsseldorf" (Luftverteidigungskommando Düsseldorf). On 1 August 1939, this Air Defense Command received its ordinal number 4, becoming "4th Air Defense Command" (Luftverteidigungskommando 4). The initial head of the staff was Kurt Steudemann, who was replaced on 31 October 1939 by Otto-Wilhelm von Renz. It was initially the only air defense command in the Ruhr area. It was assigned to Luftgau VI, headquartered at Münster, along with 7th Flak Division (created in March 1940) in Cologne.

On 1 September 1941, the 4th Air Defense Command was officially designated the "4th Flak Division" and initially remained headquartered at Düsseldorf, though its HQ was subsequently redeployed in July 1942 to Ratingen. Along with the designation as 4th Flak Division, command passed to Gerhard Hoffmann. Initially, the 4th Flak Division was responsible to protect the entire Ruhr industrial area from the Allied strategic bombing campaign, but the creation of an additional formation, the 22nd Flak Division, in Dortmund in June 1943 meant that the 4th Flak Division was only left responsible for the western Ruhr area. The 4th Flak Division staff was concurrently redeployed to Duisburg. On 5 March 1942, command passed to Johannes Hintz, who was later succeeded by Ludwig Schilffarth on 20 February 1944. The final commander was a colonel-ranked officer named Max Hecht, who took command on 15 November 1944.

By 1 November 1943, the 4th Flak Division was still part of the heaviest-defended region in terms of flak divisions, as Luftgau VI with its three flak divisions (4th, 7th, 22nd) had more flak divisions than any other Luftgau. At this point, the entire Luftgau VI, then under August Schmidt, was armed, across its three flak divisions, with 320 heavy flak batteries, 35 medium flak batteries, 125 light flak batteries, 107 searchlight batteries, and 41 various flak support batteries.

In 1945, the 4th Flak Division was used in ground-level combat on the Western Front, along the Rhine river.

On 18 April 1945, the 4th Flak Division surrendered as part of the Ruhr pocket.
