= 6th Flak Division =

6th Flak Division 6th Air Defense Command
- German: Flak-Division 6 Luftverteidigungs-Kommando Nr. 6
- Active: 1 August 1939 – May 1945
- Country: Nazi Germany
- Branch: Luftwaffe
- Type: Flak
- Role: Anti-aircraft warfare
- Size: Division
- Garrison/HQ: Hanover; Oldenburg; Brussels
- Engagements: Siege of Leningrad; Battle of Narva; Courland Pocket

Commanders
- Notable commanders: Alexander Kolb; Job Odebrecht; Werner Anton

The 6th Flak Division (German: Flak-Division 6) was a Flak division of the Luftwaffe of Nazi Germany during World War II.

== History ==
On 1 August 1939, a staff named Air Defense Command No. 6 (Luftverteidigungs-Kommando 6) was formed in Hanover from a staff that had previously deployed to Stettin. The initial head of the staff was Alexander Kolb, who was succeeded on 29 February 1940 by Wolfgang Rüter and on 15 October 1940 by Job Odebrecht.

In May 1940, the air defense command was moved to Oldenburg and, after the German invasion of Belgium, to Brussels. In mid-1941, Air Defense Command No. 6 was temporarily posted to Upper Silesia in eastern Germany, where it was tasked with the prevention of bombing attacks by the Soviet Air Forces.

On 1 September 1941, the air defense command received the official designation "6th Flak Division". Odebrecht remained divisional commander. On 1 April 1942, it was replaced in its defense task in Brussels by the newly formed 16th Flak Division and mobilized for service in the field. The 6th Flak Division was sent to the Eastern Front and attached to Luftflotte 1. It was assigned to support Army Group North and took over several regiments from the 2nd Flak Division to facilitate its task. These were Flak Regiment 18 in Duderhof (attached to the 11th Army), Flak Regiment 164 in Roshdestvenno (attached to 18th Army) and Flak Regiment 151 at Medved (attached to 16th Army). The 6th Flak Division assisted Army Group North's Siege of Leningrad and later fought in the Battle of Narva during the army group's withdrawal.

On 16 November 1942, Werner Anton took command of the 6th Flak Division. He held his command for the rest of the war.

The 6th Flak Division remained with Army Group North for the rest of the war. After 25 January 1945, the parent army group became designated "Army Group Courland". Along with its army group, the 6th Flak Division remained trapped in the Courland Pocket and eventually captured by Red Army forces when Liepāja surrendered to the Soviets.
