= Walter von Hippel =

- Born: 27 May 1897
- Died: 29 November 1972 (aged 75)
- Military career
- Allegiance: Nazi Germany
- Branch: Luftwaffe
- Rank: Generalleutnant
- Commands: 1st Flak Brigade; 3rd Flak Division; 25th Flak Division
- Conflicts: World War II
- Awards: Knight's Cross of the Iron Cross

Generalleutnant Walter von Hippel (Luftwaffe) (27 May 1897 – 29 November 1972) was a general in the Luftwaffe of Nazi Germany during World War II who commanded several flak divisions. He was also a recipient of the Knight's Cross of the Iron Cross.

Promotions:

- Portepee-Fähnrich: 8 August 1914
- Degen-Fähnrich: 21 December 1914 (Patent 24 December 1914)
- Leutnant (without Patent): 24 December 1914 (Patent established 27 January 1915)
- Oberleutnant: 10 August 1925 (RDA 1 April 1925)
- Rittmeister/Hauptmann: 1 April 1931
- Major: 1 January 1936
- Oberstleutnant: 1 January 1939
- Oberst: 19 July 1940
- Generalmajor: 1 April 1943
- Generalleutnant: 1 August 1944

Commands & Assignments:

- 8 August 1914 – 23 December 1914: Portepee-Fähnrich in Infanterie-Regiment Großherzhog von Sachsen (5. Thüringisches) Nr.94.
- 24 December 1914 – 11 March 1915: Platoon Leader, Infantry Regiment 94.
- 11 March 1915 – 5 October 1915: Wounded/hospital.
- 18 May 1915 – 11 September 1915: At the same, detached to War School Courses in Kassel.
- 6 October 1915 – 13 August 1916: Company chief in Infantry Regiment 94.
- 14 August 1916 – 21 August 1916: Deputy Adjutant of I./Infantry Regiment 94.
- 22 August 1916 – 4 November 1916: Sick/in hospital.
- 5 November 1916 – 1 September 1918: Adjutant of I./Infantry Regiment 94.
- 1 September 1917 – 20 October 1917: At the same time, detached as Deputy Adjutant of Infantry Regiment 94. 2 September 1918 – 8 October 1918: Commander of I./Infantry Regiment 94.
- 8 October 1918 – 17 July 1919: Wounded and in British captivity.
- 17 July 1919 – 24 August 1919: At the disposal of. 25 August 1919 – 4 September 1919: Ordnance Officer on the staff of Brigade von Taysen / Guard Cavalry Schützen Division.
- 5 September 1919 – 14 May 1920: Ordnance Officer on the staff of Schützen Regiment 59, unit later renamed Infantry Regiment 6.
- 15 May 1920 – 18 May 1920: Ordnance Officer on the staff of Infantry Regiment 5.
- 19 May 1920 – 31 August 1920: Ordnance Officer on the staff of II (Guard Jäger Battalion)/Infantry Regiment 5.
- 1 September 1920 – 31 December 1920: Platoon leader in Infantry Regiment 5.
- 3 September 1920 – 20 October 1920: At the same time, detached as Deputy Ordnance Officer to the Operations Officer (Ia) of Reichswehr Brigade 3.
- 1 January 1921 – 23 October 1921: Platoon leader in Infantry Regiment 9.
- 24 October 1921 – 22 October 1922: Detached as Commandant of Staff Quarters on the staff of the 3rd Division.
- 23 October 1922 – 25 August 1924: Platoon leader in Infantry Regiment 9.
- 25 June 1923 – 15 July 1923: At the same time, detached as deputy company leader in Infantry Regiment 9.
- 26 August 1924 – 14 October 1926: Transferred to the staff of Infantry Regiment 9.
- 15 October 1926 – 30 September 1929: Platoon leader in Infantry Regiment 9.
- 4 April 1927 – 12 June 1927: Detached to II Officers' Weapons School Course Dresden.
- 1 April 1928 – 30 September 1928: Detached as Assistance Officer to the Operations Officer (Ia) on the staff of the 3rd Division.
- 1 April 1929 – 30 September 1929: Detached to II./Schiffsstamm-Division, Baltic Sea.
- 1 October 1929 – 30 September 1932: Transferred to Cavalry Regiment 11 and, at the same time, detached as Training Officer to the Commanding Officer of Oppeln.
- 1 October 1932 – 31 March 1933: On the staff of the Training Battalion of Infantry Regiment 9.
- 10 January 1933 – 31 March 1933: Detached to Tactical Technical Officers' Course with the Kraftfahr-Lehrstab [Motorized Instruction/Demonstration Staff], Berlin.
- 1 April 1933 – 21 May 1934: Company chief in Infantry Regiment 9.
- 22 May 1934 – 24 September 1934: Leader of Machinegun Experimental Command Döberitz.
- 22 May 1934 – 8 June 1934: Detached to the Air Defense Course Pillau.
- 19 July 1934 – 28 July 1934: Detached to Antiaircraft Machinegun Course in Schillig-Reede.
- 24 August 1934 – 19 September 1934: Detached to Antiaircraft Machinegun Course at the Flak School Döberitz and Wustrow.
- 25 September 1934 – 31 March 1935: Company chief in Transport Battalion Brandenburg.
- 1 April 1935: Transferred from the Army to the Luftwaffe.
- 1 April 1935 – 30 September 1935: Battery chief in Flak Battalion Brandenburg.
- 1 October 1935 – 31 December 1935: Staff of Higher Flak Artillery Commander II.
- 1 January 1936 – 31 March 1936: Chief Personnel Officer (IIa) on the staff of Higher Flak Artillery Commander II.
- 1 April 1936 – 31 March 1938: Operations officer (Ia) to the Senior Commander of Flak Artillery in Luftkreis [Air District] II.
- 1 April 1938 – 14 October 1938: Chief of Staff, Luftgau [Air Zone] Command IV, Dresden.
- 15 October 1938 – 14 November 1938: Commander of IV./Luftwaffe Regiment "General Göring."
- 15 November 1938 – 26 January 1939: Commander of II./Luftwaffe Regiment "General Göring."
- 27 January 1939 – 30 September 1939: Commander of IV./Luftwaffe Regiment "General Göring."
- 1 October 1939 – 5 July 1940: Commander of Flak-Regiment 102 (motorized).
- 6 July 1940 – 7 September 1940: Commander of Flak-Regiment 43 in Dessau.
- 8 September 1940 – 3 February 1941: Tactics Instructor at the Air War Academy, Berlin-Gatow.
- 4 February 1941 – 31 March 1941: Commander of 1st Flak Brigade.
- 1 April 1941 – 30 June 1942: Commander of 10th Flak Brigade.
- 1 July 1942 – 19 April 1944: Commander of 3rd Flak Division, Hamburg.
- 20 April 1944 – 31 January 1945: Commander of 25th Flak Division.
- 1 February 1945 – 8 May 1945: Flak Leader of the 10th Army in Italy.
- 1 May 1944 – 8 May 1945: At the same time, Higher Flak Leader Italy.
- 8 May 1945 – 1948: British prisoner of war.
  - 9 January 1946 transferred to Island Farm Special Camp 11 from Camp 1
  - 12 May 1948 transferred to Camp 186 for repatriation

== Awards and decorations ==
- Knight's Cross of the Iron Cross on 29 July 1940 as Oberstleutnant and commander of Flak-Regiment 102 (mot.)
- Prussian Iron Cross, 1st Class (1914): 27 May 1917.
- Prussian Iron Cross, 2nd Class (1914): 16 March 1915.
- 1939 Bar to the Prussian Iron Cross, 1st Class: 1 June 1940.
- 1939 Bar to the Prussian Iron Cross, 2nd Class: 15 May 1940.
- Saxe-Weimar-Eisenach Wilhelm Ernst War Cross (one of only 362 ever awarded): 8 August 1917.
- Saxe-Weimar-Eisenach House Order of Vigilance or the White Falcon, Knight 2nd Class with Swords: 22 March 1915.
- Saxe-Ernestine Ducal House Order, Knight 2nd Class with Swords: 18 July 1918.
- Hesse General Honor Decoration, “for Bravery”: 1 October 1918.
- Cross of Honor for Combatants 1914–1918
- Armed Forces Long Service Award, 1st Class (25-year Service Cross)
- Armed Forces Long Service Award, 3rd Class (12-year Service Medal)
- Luftwaffe Flak Combat Badge: 25 August 1941.
- Luftwaffe Ground Combat Badge: 13 October 1942.
- Wound Badge in Silver – World War I award: September 1918.

Military offices
Preceded by Generalleutnant Theodor Spieß	Commander of 3rd Flak Division; 30 June 1942 – 19 April 1944	Succeeded by Generalmajor Alwin Wolz
Preceded by None	Commander of 25th Flak Division; 20 April 1944 – 10 February 1945	Succeeded by Oberst Oskar Vorbrugg
