= Georg Neuffer =

German general (1895-1977)

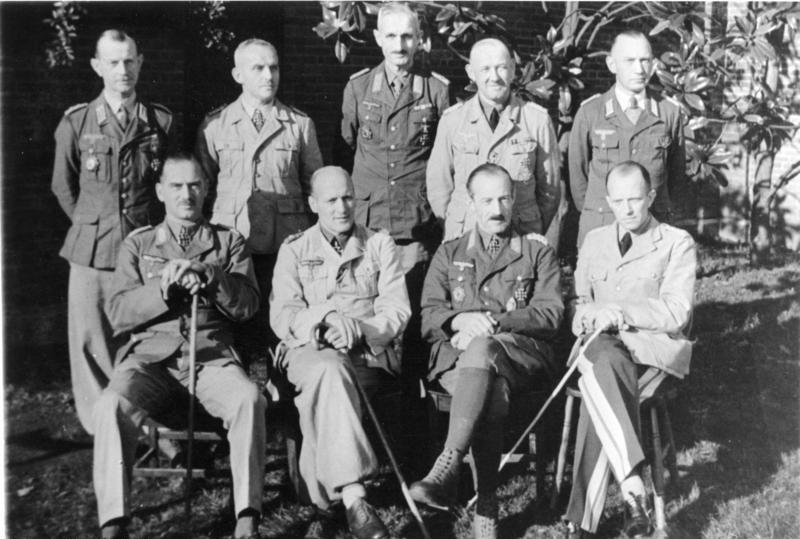
- Georg Neuffer, 2nd row standing 2nd from left
- Born: 18 April 1895
- Died: 11 May 1977 (aged 82)
- Allegiance: Nazi Germany
- Branch: Luftwaffe
- Rank: Generalleutnant
- Commands: 5th Flak Division; 20th Flak Division
- Battles / wars: World War II
- Awards: Knight's Cross of the Iron Cross

Georg Neuffer (18 April 1895 – 11 May 1977) was a general in the Luftwaffe of Nazi Germany during World War II. He was a recipient of the Knight's Cross of the Iron Cross. Neuffer surrendered to the British troops in May 1943, following the surrender of German troops in North Africa. He was released in October 1947.

== Awards and decorations ==
- Knight's Cross of the Iron Cross on 1 August 1943 as Generalmajor and commander of 20. Flak-Division (mot.)

Military offices
Preceded by Generalleutnant Kurt Menzel	Commander of 5th Flak Division; 18 April 1942 – 11 November 1942	Succeeded by Generalmajor Julius Kuderna
Preceded by None	Commander of 20th Flak Division; 12 November 1942 – 10 May 1943	Succeeded by Surrendered in May 1943
