= 7th Flak Division =

7th Flak Division 7th Air Defense Command
- German: Flak-Division 7 Luftverteidigungs-Kommando Nr. 7
- Active: March 1940 – May 1945
- Country: Nazi Germany
- Branch: Luftwaffe
- Type: Flak
- Role: Anti-aircraft warfare
- Size: Division
- Garrison/HQ: Cologne; Mönchengladbach (1945); Herford (1945)
- Engagements: Bombing of Cologne in World War II; Western Front

Commanders
- Notable commanders: Heinrich Burchard

The 7th Flak Division (German: Flak-Division 7) was a Flak division of the Luftwaffe of Nazi Germany during World War II.

== History ==
In March 1940, the air defenses in the Ruhr area, currently under exclusive control of 4th Air Defense Command (the later 4th Flak Division), then deployed to Düsseldorf, were reorganized through the creation of the new 7th Air Defense Command (Luftverteidigungs-Kommando Nr. 7) in Cologne. It was assigned to Luftgau VI, headquartered at Münster. Along with the later 4th Flak Division, these two were later joined by the eventual 22nd Flak Division.

The 7th Air Defense Command was charged with the defense of the southern edges of the Rhine-Ruhr agglomeration, notably including the Cologne—Aachen area. One of its major subordinate unit was the 14th Flak Regiment at Cologne, also dubbed "Flak Group Cologne" (Flakgruppe Köln). It also oversaw the Air Signals Detachment 127. The initial head of the staff was Kurt Menzel.

On 1 September 1941, the air defense command, still commanded from Cologne, received the designation "7th Flak Division". In the meantime, Menzel had been succeeded by Max Hesse on 5 May 1941 and by Heinrich Burchard on 1 August 1941.

On 21 February 1942, Rudolf Eibenstein became divisional commander of the 7th Flak Division, followed by Burchard's return to command on 1 March 1943. The final divisional commander was a colonel-ranked officer (later promoted to Generalmajor) named Alfred Erhard, who assumed command on 1 August 1944.

By 1 November 1943, the 7th Flak Division was still part of the heaviest-defended region of Germany, as Luftgau VI (4th, 7th, 22nd divisions) had more flak divisions than any other Luftgau. At this point, Luftgau VI (August Schmidt) was armed, across its three flak divisions, with 320 heavy flak batteries, 35 medium flak batteries, 125 light flak batteries, 107 searchlight batteries, and 41 various flak support batteries.

Towards the end of the war, the 7th Flak Division was mobilized for ground-level combat and sent to Mönchengladbach. By 1 March 1945, it was in the Herford area. After February 1945, the 7th Flak Division was strengthened through the addition of the 1st Flak Brigade (previously part of the 16th Flak Division).
