= Wolfgang Pickert =

Nazi general (1897–1984)

- Born: 3 February 1897; Posen, Province of Posen, Kingdom of Prussia, German Empire
- Died: 19 July 1984 (aged 87); Weinheim, Baden-Württemberg, West Germany
- Relatives: ∞ 1928 Dorothea Behrends; 3 children
- Military career
- Allegiance: German Empire; Weimar Republic; Nazi Germany
- Branch: Prussian Army; Freikorps; Reichswehr; Heer; Luftwaffe
- Service years: 1914–1945
- Rank: General der Flakartillerie
- Commands: 9th Flak-Division; III Flak Corps
- Conflicts: World War I World War II: Battle of France; Defense of the Reich; Battle of the Caucasus; Battle of Stalingrad; Kerch–Eltigen Operation; Crimean Offensive (1944); Operation Overlord; Operation Epsom; Falaise pocket; Battle of the Bulge
- Awards: Knight's Cross of the Iron Cross with Oak Leaves
- Other work: Author

Wolfgang Friedrich Wilhelm Siegfried Pickert (3 February 1897 – 19 July 1984) was a general in the Luftwaffe of Nazi Germany during World War II who commanded the III Flak Corps. He was a recipient of the Knight's Cross of the Iron Cross with Oak Leaves.

On 22/23 January 1943, Pickert, at the time commanding the 9th Flak Division, was flown out of the Stalingrad encirclement avoiding capture; he attempted to return to his men in Stalingrad but was disallowed from doing so.

After the war, having been a British POW until 5 January 1948, General (Ret.) Pickert contributed to historical analyses, including eyewitness accounts of the Stalingrad airlift published in military journals. He also wrote three books between 1942 and 1955.

== Awards and decorations ==
- Iron Cross (1914) 2nd and 1st Class
  - 2nd Class on 2 November 1916
  - 1st Class on 13 April 1918
- Wound Badge (1918) in Black
- Baltic Cross
- Honour Cross of the World War 1914/1918 with Swords
- Wehrmacht Long Service Award, 4th to 1st Class
- Pilot/Observer Badge
- Repetition Clasp 1939 to the Iron Cross 1914, 2nd and 1st Class
  - 2nd Class (1939)
  - 1st Class (1940)
- Winter Battle in the East 1941–42 Medal
- Anti-Aircraft Flak Battle Badge on 19 August 1942
- Kuban Shield
- Two references by name in the Wehrmachtbericht: 28 April 1944 and 8 May 1944
- German Cross in Gold on 7 December 1942 as Generalmajor in the 9. Flak-Division
- Knight's Cross of the Iron Cross with Oak Leaves
  - Knight's Cross on 11 January 1943 as Generalmajor and commander of 9. Flak-Division (mot.)
  - 489th Oak Leaves on 5 June 1944 as Generalmajor and commander of III. Flak-Korps

Military offices
Preceded by General der Flakartillerie Otto-Wilhelm von Renz	Commander of 9th Flak-Division; 25 June 1942 - May 1944	Succeeded by Generalleutnant Adolf Pirmann
Preceded by Generalleutnant Johannes Hintz	Commander of III. Flakkorps; 14 May 1944 - 20 July 1944	Succeeded by Oberst Werner von Kistowski
Preceded by Oberst Werner von Kistowski	Commander of III. Flakkorps; 2 August 1944 - 20 March 1945	Succeeded by Generalleutnant Heino von Rantzau
