= Alexander Kolb =

- Born: 12 May 1891; Mainz, German Empire
- Died: 4 April 1963 (aged 71) Darmstadt, West Germany
- Allegiance: German Empire (to 1918); Weimar Republic (to 1933); Nazi Germany
- Branch: Army
- Service years: 1909–43
- Rank: Generalleutnant
- Commands: Air Defense Command 6 Air Defense Command 8
- Conflicts: World War I World War II

Alexander Kolb (12 May 1891 – 4 April 1963) was a German Generalleutnant during World War II.

== Biography ==
Kolb was born in Mainz. He entered Army Service as Fahnenjunker and Company-Officer in the 3rd Foot-Artillery-Regiment in 1914. After Adjutant of the General Of Flak Artillery of Fortress of Mainz he became Battery-Leader in the 3rd Foot-Artillery-Regiment (1914/15) and 18th Reserve-Foot-Artillery-Regiment (1915/18). 1918 he was a commander of the 32nd Foot-Artillery-Battalion. After the First World War he works for the Hessian Protection-Police and State-Police-Department Worms.

In 1935 he became Battalion-Commander in the 10th Flak-Regiment and 1936 Battalion-Commander in the 25th Flak-Regiment. After use as Commander of the 13th Flak-Regiment (1937/38) and Higher Commander of Flak Artillery III (1938) he was Commander of Air-Defence-Command 2, Stettin and Delegate with the Formation of Air-Defence-Command. At 1 January 1939 he was appointed Generalmajor and 1 November 1940 Generalleutnant.

1939/40 he was Commander of Air Defense Command 6 (Hannover), and 1940 Commander of Flak Artillery in Luftgau XI. In 1940/41, he was assigned to command Air Defense Command 8. From 1 Jul 1941 to 31 May 1943 Alexander Kolb was Officer with Special Duties of the Ministry of Aviation (Germany) (RLM) and Commander-in-Chief of the Luftwaffe. He retired in 1943.

== Awards and decorations ==
- Iron Cross of 1914, 1st and 2nd class
- Clasp to the Iron Cross of 1939, 1st and 2nd class
