= Ernst Buffa =

Ernst Joachim Valentin Gustav Buffa
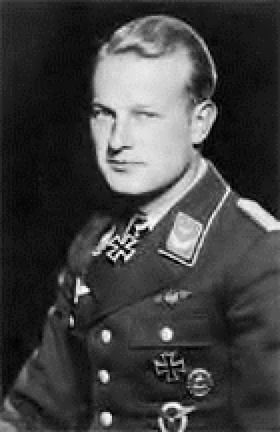
- Born: 14 February 1893
- Died: 19 September 1971 (aged 78)
- Military career
- Allegiance: German Empire; Weimar Republic; Nazi Germany
- Branch: Prussian Army; Reichsheer; Luftwaffe
- Service years: 1912–1945
- Rank: Generalleutnant
- Commands: 12th Flak Division; 21st Flak Division
- Conflicts: World War II
- Awards: Knight's Cross of the Iron Cross

Ernst Buffa (14 February 1893 – 19 September 1971) was a general in the Luftwaffe of Nazi Germany during World War II. Son of Franz Freiherr Buffa von Lilienberg und Castellalt, Baron of the Holy Roman Empire, he enlisted in the German army in 1912. He entered the Military Academy of Berlin in May 1916. During World War I he was sent to the Western Front. He was also a recipient of the Knight's Cross of the Iron Cross. At the end of the war he was held as an American prisoner-of-war from May 1945 until 1947. After his release he moved to Argentina where he wrote about his wartime experiences. He died in 1971 in the village of Traben-Trarbach.

== Awards and decorations ==
- Knight's Cross of the Iron Cross on 5 September 1944 as Generalleutnant and commander of 12. Flak-Division (mot.)

Military offices
Preceded by None	Commander of 104th Flak Regiment; 1 November 1939 – 5 June 1940	Succeeded by Hermann Lichtenberger
Preceded by Generalleutnant Gotthard Frantz	Commander of 12th Flak Division; 21 December 1942 – 25 April 1944	Succeeded by Generalleutnant Werner Prellberg
Preceded by Generalleutnant Kurt Steudemann	Commander of 21st Flak Division; 6 June 1944 – 30 November 1944	Succeeded by Oberst Erich Gröpler
