= 9th Flak Division =

9th Flak Division 9th Air Defense Command
- German: 9. Flak-Division; Luftverteidigungs-Kommando Nr. 9
- Active: January 1941 – May 1945
- Country: Nazi Germany
- Branch: Luftwaffe
- Type: Artillery
- Role: Anti-aircraft warfare
- Size: Division c. 12,000 men + 45 flak batteries (Nov. 1942)
- Engagements: Case Blue; Battle of Stalingrad; Kuban bridgehead

Commanders
- Notable commanders: Wolfgang Pickert

The 9th Flak Division (German: 9. Flak-Division) was a Flak division of the German Luftwaffe in World War II which saw action on the Eastern Front. It is most notable for its role (and destruction) in the Battle of Stalingrad. Another formation with the same name was deployed to the Eastern Front and saw combat in the Kuban bridgehead.

== History ==
=== 9th Air Defense Command ===
In July 1940, Air Defense Command 9 (Luftverteidigungs-Kommando Nr. 9) was formed in German-occupied France, in the Luftgau Belgien-Nordfrankreich air district. It was staffed with the 30th and 59th Flak Regiments and initially intended to assist Operation Felix, the planned German attack through German-aligned Spain against Gibraltar. The initial head of the staff was Gerhard Hoffmann, who was replaced on 17 March 1941 by Wilhelm von Renz.

=== First deployment, 1941–43 ===
On 1 September 1941, the 9th Air Defense Command was renamed "9th Flak Division". It remained in German-occupied France until January 1942, after which it was sent to the southern sector of the Eastern Front. On the Eastern Front, the 9th Flak Division covered Army Group South (with the 37th, 42nd, 91st and 104th Flak Regiments) before it was restricted to the area and the advance of the 6th Army. Towards the end of 1942, the 9th Flak Division consisted of the Flak Regiments 37, 91 and 104. On 25 June 1942, Wolfgang Pickert assumed command of the division.

The 9th Flak Division participated in Case Blue, the German summer offensive of 1942 through Soviet Ukraine towards the Caucasus and the Caspian Sea. In the open terrain of southwestern Russia, the 9th Flak Division was a capable ground support force that managed to assist the army through the use of its heavy 8.8 cm Flak guns against Soviet tanks, destroying T-34 tanks from around 2,000 m (6,600 ft). At the beginning of Case Blue, the 9th Flak Division contained Flak Regiments 12, 37, 91 and 104.

==== The 9th Flak Division in Stalingrad ====
As part of the 6th Army's advance towards the Volga, the 9th Flak Division participated in the Battle of Stalingrad. In November 1942, the 9th Flak Division, then under Luftflotte 4, consisted of 45 flak batteries and 12,000 Luftwaffe personnel. The number of anti-aircraft guns at the beginning of the Battle of Stalingrad was around 450, though these had to cover all of the 6th Army. It became one of the 21 divisions of the 6th Army and parts of the 4th Panzer Army encircled in the cauldron of Stalingrad. On 1 September 1942, the 9th Flak Division contained the 37th, 91st and 104th Flak Regiments, each with four flak battalions. This order of battle remained unchanged by 19 November 1942.

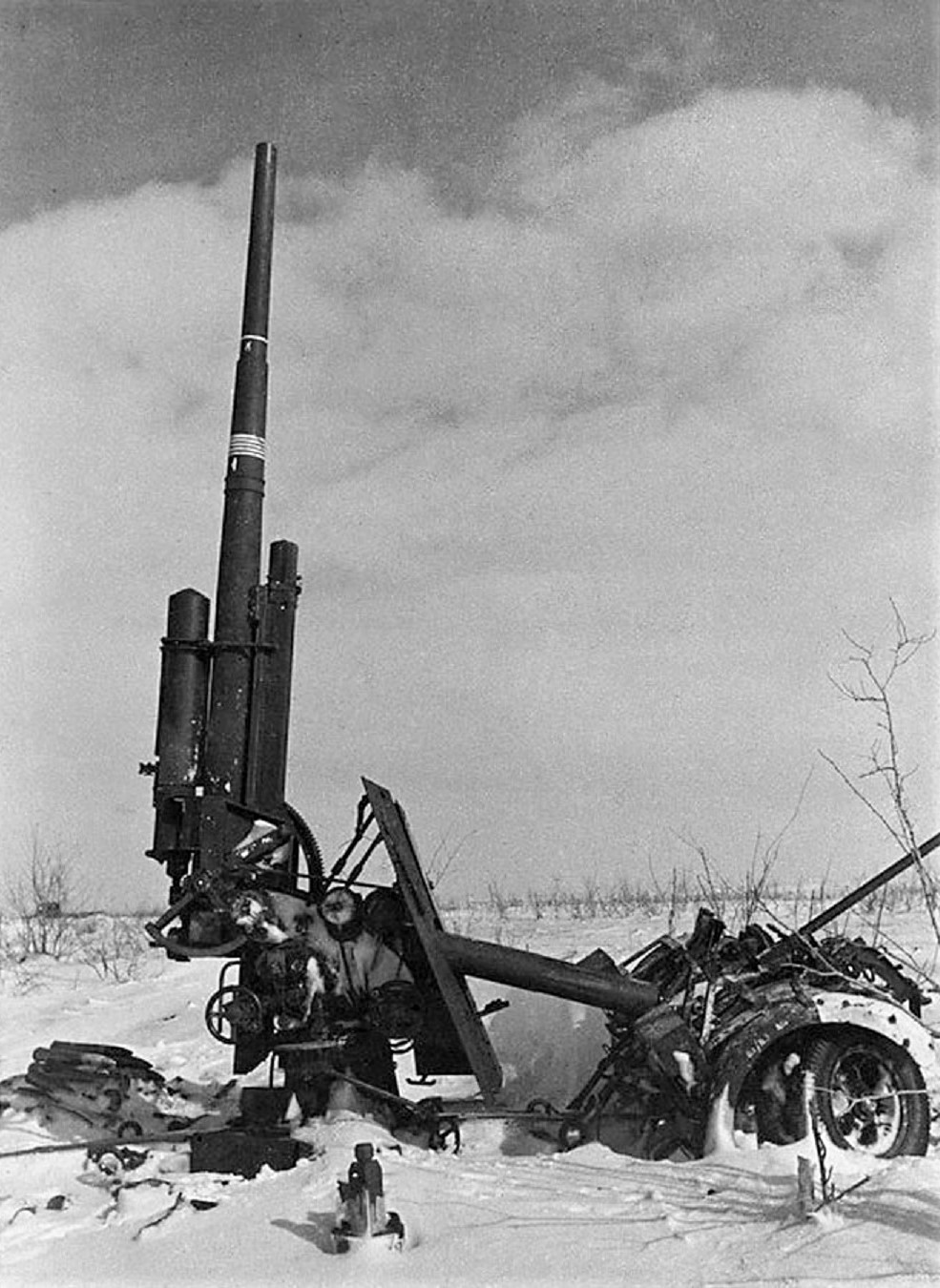
A destroyed 8.8 cm Flak 18/36/37/41, photographed by a Red Army soldier in the vicinity of Stalingrad in 1943

After the Soviet encirclement of the German troops in Stalingrad (Operation Uranus), 9th Flak Division commander Wolfgang Pickert disagreed with Hermann Göring's project to airlift supplies into Stalingrad and insisted on a breakout attempt. In this, he agreed with the opinions of several major German commanders in the campaign, such as Hermann Hoth, Friedrich Paulus and Maximilian von Weichs, as well as Wolfram von Richthofen of the 4th Air Fleet. Pickert insisted on a breakout as early as 22 November, within days of the completion of the Soviet encirclement of Stalingrad. This request was put off by Paulus, who believed that it was necessary to wait at least several days to establish readiness for a breakout. However, before such readiness could be attained, the breakout was prohibited by the Wehrmacht Supreme Command, which was acting directly at the behest of Adolf Hitler.

With the denial of the breakout attempt, the airlift had to be attempted. Pickert was subsequently named the most senior Luftwaffe commander in the Stalingrad pocket and placed in charge of all Luftwaffe operations within the besieged German lines. As a result, one of the primary tasks of 9th Flak Division personnel in Stalingrad was the loading and unloading of the German planes that arrived in the city as part of the airlift. It came to clashes of leadership between the staffs of the 9th Flak Division and the superior 6th Army, especially over the question whether Gumrak Airfield should be used for operations. The 6th Army leadership preferred to avoid the airfield's usage, as it was somewhat exposed and in proximity to a 6th Army command staff, whereas the Luftwaffe insisted on its usage to increase the potential intake of supply.

Throughout the siege of Stalingrad, the anti-aircraft guns of the 9th Flak Division were vital support weapons against advancing Red Army forces. Starting in December 1942, the flak batteries were increasingly immobile due to an increasing lack of fuel and transport capacities.

The encirclement of the 9th Flak Division at Stalingrad increased the importance of the 4th Anti-Aircraft Brigade of the Kingdom of Romania. This brigade now had to assume the sole responsibility for numerous Axis airfields outside of the Stalingrad pocket.

With the surrender of the 6th Army in Stalingrad, the 9th Flak Division was annihilated. Along with it, its subordinate Flak Regiments (37th, 91st, 104th) were destroyed. Only parts of the command staff were flown out of the Stalingrad cauldron. Richard Haizmann was the final commander of the 9th Flak Division in the cauldron.

=== Second deployment, 1943–44 ===
On 7 February 1943, another 9th Flak Division was formed using the remnants of the defunct division's staff that had been evacuated from Stalingrad. This new 9th Flak Division contained the Air Signals Detachment 129 (Motorized) as well as the 27th, 42nd and 77th Flak Regiments and the three Flak Searchlight Detachments (III./8, III./43, I./Lehr-Vers.Abt. FAS). Wolfgang Pickert, who had been flown out of Stalingrad in late January, assumed command of the new 9th Flak Division. Because of the loss of almost all of the division's equipment, the new 9th Flak Division had to undergo a lengthy re-equipment process.

In February 1943, another 9th Flak Division was formed in the Kuban bridgehead. Between 8 April and 10 May 1943, it scored kills against 265 aircraft and 189 tanks. Over the same period, it lost 182 88mm flak guns as well as 547 light and medium flak guns, 181 searchlights, 36 fire-control gears, 16 radars and 5,715 personnel (including 3,949 MIA, 456 KIA and 1,310 WIA). It thus became a showcase of the difficulties encountered by those Flak divisions that were pulled away from the defense of major German cities and sent to directly cooperate with the German Army in ground-level combat.

In May 1943, the 9th Flak Division was assigned to the supervision of the I Flak Corps, along with the 10th, 15th and 17th Flak Divisions.

The second 9th Flak Division remained in Crimea, where it assisted the 17th Army, which was desperately low on armored vehicles, in ground-level anti-tank warfare. In this, the 9th Flak Division proved effective in its deployment of both 8.8cm Flak guns as well as improvised armored flak trains against Soviet tanks. On 28 October 1943, the division possessed 134 heavy 8.8cm guns as well as 334 lighter models.

The second iteration of the 9th Flak Division was destroyed during the Crimean offensive of April 1944. In the final days of that campaign, six flak batteries of the 9th Flak Division were drawn into a Kampfgruppe under Paul Betz, along with an armored flak train (dubbed "Michael") and the personnel of the 615th Field Training Regiment. This Kampfgruppe fought a delaying action against the 19th Tank Corps of the Red Army outside of Sevastopol for around 12 hours on 14 April 1944.

=== Third deployment, 1944–45 ===
A third and final 9th Flak Division was deployed in the Breslau area in April and May 1944. It was sent to the 1st Army on the Western Front, where it saw combat in the Saarbrücken area and oversaw the 169th Flak Regiment, among others. On 27 May 1944, Wilhelm van Koolwijk held the division for a month-long tenure, before Adolf Pirmann assumed command as the formation's final commander from 23 June 1944 until the war's end. The 9th Flak Division was instructed to assist Operation Northwind around the turn of the years 1944 and 1945, but was largely unable to provide any significant assistance due to a shortage of equipment. On 1 February 1945, the 9th Flak Division was at the Wörsbach and on 26 March at Germersheim.

== Legacy ==
Wolfgang Pickert, the commander of the 9th Flak Division at Stalingrad, left behind an account of his actions to the United States Air Force Historical Research Agency in Montgomery, Alabama.
