= Kurt Andersen (general) =

German general and Knight's Cross recipient

Kurt Georg Heinrich Andersen
- Andersen as an Oberst
- Born: 2 October 1898; German Empire
- Died: 9 January 2003 (aged 104); Bonn, Germany
- Military career
- Allegiance: German Empire; Weimar Republic; Nazi Germany; West Germany
- Branch: Prussian Army; Reichsheer; Luftwaffe; Bundesgrenzschutz
- Service years: 1915–1919; 1935–1945; 1956–1961
- Rank: Generalmajor (Luftwaffe); Brigadegeneral (Bundesgrenzschutz)
- Commands: 23rd Flak Division
- Conflicts: First World War Latvian Revolution; Second World War: Invasion of Poland; Battle of France; Battle of the Caucasus; Battle of the Seelow Heights; Battle of Halbe
- Awards: Knight's Cross of the Iron Cross; Order of Merit

Kurt Andersen (2 October 1898 – 9 January 2003) was a general in the Luftwaffe of Nazi Germany during World War II and in the Bundesgrenzschutz of West Germany. He was also a recipient of the Knight's Cross of the Iron Cross.

== Awards and decorations ==
- Clasp to the Iron Cross (1939) 2nd Class (22 September 1939) & 1st Class (3 May 1940)
- Ground Assault Badge of the Luftwaffe (24 December 1942)
- Knight's Cross of the Iron Cross on 23 December 1942 as Oberst and commander of Flak-Regiment 153
- Grand Cross of the Order of Merit of the Federal Republic of Germany (Großes Verdienstkreuz des Verdienstordens der Bundesrepublik Deutschland) 1961

Military offices
Preceded by Oberst Oskar Vorbrugg	Commander of 23rd Flak Division; 30 January 1945 – 8 May 1945	Succeeded by None
Preceded by Brigadegeneral Anton Grasser	Inspector of the Bundesgrenzschutz; 10 July 1956 – 31 March 1961	Succeeded by Brigadegeneral Alfred Samlowski
