= Oskar Vorbrugg =

German General

- Born: 11 July 1902
- Died: 21 May 1946 (aged 43); Rimini, Italy
- Military career
- Allegiance: Nazi Germany
- Branch: Luftwaffe
- Service years: 1919–45
- Rank: Generalmajor
- Commands: 10th Flak Division; 23rd Flak Division; 25th Flak Division; 27th Flak Division
- Conflicts: World War II
- Awards: Knight's Cross of the Iron Cross

Oskar Vorbrugg (11 July 1902 – 21 May 1946) was a general in the Luftwaffe of Nazi Germany during World War II. He was a recipient of the Knight's Cross of the Iron Cross.

During the period of 3–10 February 1945, he was in command of the 10th Flak Division, briefly replacing Franz Engel in this role.

On 2 May 1945, he was appointed as the commander of the 27th Flak Division.

== Awards ==
- Knight's Cross of the Iron Cross on 9 June 1944 as Oberst commander of Flak Regiment 21.

Military offices
Preceded by Franz Engel	Commander of 10th Flak Division; 3–10 February 1945	Succeeded by Franz Engel
Preceded by Walter Kathmann	Commander of 23rd Flak Division; 24 October 1944 – 30 January 1945	Succeeded by Kurt Andersen
Preceded by Walter von Hippel	Commander of 25th Flak Division; 10 February 1945 – March 1945	Succeeded by Alfred Thomas
Preceded by Walter Feyerabend	Commander of 27th Flak Division; 2 – 8 May 1945	Succeeded by None
