= 19th Flak Division =

- German: 19. Flak-Division
- Active: 15 August 1942 – 13 May 1943; 1 November 1943 – 8 May 1945
- Country: Nazi Germany
- Branch: Luftwaffe
- Type: Flak
- Role: Anti-aircraft warfare
- Size: Division
- Engagements: World War II; North African campaign; Battle of Alam el Halfa; Second Battle of El Alamein; Tunisian campaign; Battle of the Mareth Line; Battle of Wadi Akarit; Axis occupation of Greece; World War II in Yugoslavia

The 19th Flak Division (German: 19. Flak-Division) was a Flak division of the German Luftwaffe in World War II. It was formed twice and in both iterations saw extensive action in the Mediterranean theater, including the North African campaign, the Axis occupation of Greece, and Yugoslav partisan warfare.

The first formation named existed from August 1942 until May 1943 and saw combat in North Africa before it was destroyed in the Tunisian campaign. A second 19th Flak Division was assembled in early November 1943 in Athens in German-occupied Greece and saw service during the withdrawal of Axis forces from the Balkans through Yugoslavia. By the end of April 1945, it was in the Zagreb area.

== Operational history ==
=== First deployment (August 1942 – May 1943) ===
On 15 August 1942, the 19th Flak Division was first assembled on the island of Sicily (Fascist Italy) from the staff of 7th Flak Brigade for the purpose of an offensive deployment to the North African theater. The division initially contained three regiments (Flak Regiment 102, Flak Regiment 135, Flak Regiment 114), of which responsibility for Flak Regiment 114 initially laid with Luftgau Afrika before being passed to the division itself. Additionally, the division was eventually joined by Flak Regiment 66. The division's initial commander was Heinrich Burchard, who was replaced by Gotthard Frantz on 21 December 1942.

The division fought in the Battle of Alam el Halfa, where its main task was the air defense against the Desert Air Force. The 19th Flak Division's staff document Allied bombardment of Axis lines, estimating 64 major attacks between 31 August and 4 September 1942 alone, resulting in 15,600 bomb drops in a particular area of 12 to 15 times 8 to 10 kilometers, resulting in roughly 100 bombs per square kilometer of soil, or 250 per square mile.

The 19th Flak Division, with an initial personnel strength of 6,302 as of 20 October 1942, served as one of the main German formations (along with 15th Panzer, 21st Panzer, 90th Light, 164th Light, Ramcke Brigade) in the decisive Second Battle of El Alamein. With a total of 86 8.8 cm Flak guns, important both as anti-aircraft and as anti-tank weapons, Flak Regiment 102 and Flak Regiment 135 were the most important anti-aircraft regiments at El Alamein. On 20 August, Flak Regiment 135 was temporarily attached to Ramcke Brigade to provide its paratroopers with anti-aircraft protection. Another 52 8.8 cm guns were held in the rear areas to defend airfields and seaports. Bernard Montgomery, commander of the opposing British 8th Army, cautioned his subordinate armored formations to steer clear of German flak formations where possible, to avoid unnecessary casualties at the hands of 19th Flak Division's forces.

After defeat in El Alamein, Panzer Army Africa was forced on a lengthy retreat through the Italian Cyrenaica (and, under the impression of Operation Torch, eventually Tunisia). On 17 November 1942, the army's commander Erwin Rommel reported on the depleted strength of his forces, giving 19th Flak Division's remaining equipment as 24 heavy and 40 light anti-aircraft batteries. The number of 8.8 cm Flak guns was 40 on 23 November, during the army's defense of the Brega position.

In the Tunisian bridgehead, 19th Flak Division continued to serve Panzer Army Africa (later: 1st Italian Army), whereas the recently inserted 20th Flak Division was responsible for the sector of the newly added 5th Panzer Army. The division's 8.8 cm flak guns supported the Young Fascists Division and 101st "Trieste" Division against the British assaults in mid-March 1943 ("Operation Pugilist") in the Battle of the Mareth Line. Later, the division accompanied the northwards retreat of Axis forces through Tunisia, including at the Wadi Akarit position. The remnants of the division were trapped alongside the rest of the army in the ever-tightening Allied perimeter around Tunis, where the anti-aircraft batteries of 19th Flak Division fell under heavy attack when the final Allied thrust against Tunis began on the morning of 6 May 1943. Tunis and Bizerta fell into Allied hands on 7 May as the Axis forces began to disintegrate and surrender.

The 19th Flak Division was destroyed when Army Group Afrika surrendered. Its final commander, Gotthard Frantz, joined the list of officers who received the prestigious Knight's Cross of the Iron Cross after the collapse of Army Group Afrika when he received the award on 18 May, for his services as commander of 19th Flak Division.

=== Second deployment (November 1943 – May 1945) ===
On 1 November 1943, 19th Flak Division was reassembled in Athens in German-occupied Greece, where it was additionally in charge of Flak Regiment 58 on German-occupied Crete. The 19th Flak Division was responsible to 10th Air Corps.

19th Flak Division was dragged along in the Axis withdrawal from the Balkans. The division withdrew via Thessaloniki (October 1944), Dubrovnik (December 1944), Nagykanizsa (February 1945) and Zagreb (late April 1945). The division surrendered to US Army forces on 8 May 1945.

== Noteworthy individuals ==
- Heinrich Burchard, commander of 19th Flak Division (6 August 1942 – 21 December 1942)
- Gotthard Frantz, commander of 19th Flak Division (21 December 1942 – May 1943)
- Paul Pavel, commander of 19th Flak Division (1 November 1943 – 8 May 1945)
