= Hermann Lichtenberger (general) =

- Born: 20 August 1892
- Died: 15 January 1959 (aged 66)
- Allegiance: Germany
- Branch: Luftwaffe
- Rank: Generalmajor
- Commands: 4th Flak Brigade
- Awards: Knight's Cross of the Iron Cross

Hermann Lichtenberger (20 August 1892 – 15 January 1959) was a general in the Luftwaffe of Nazi Germany during World War II who commanded the 4th Flak Brigade. He was a recipient of the Knight's Cross of the Iron Cross. Lichtenberger retired from active duty in 1943.

== Awards and decorations ==
- Knight's Cross of the Iron Cross on 12 November 1941 as Oberst and commander of Flak-Regiment 104 (mot)

Military offices
| Preceded by Oberst Ernst Buffa | Commander of Flak-Regiment 104 (mot); 5 June 1940 – 17 November 1941 | Succeeded by Oberst Rosenfeld |
