= 10th Flak Division =

10th Flak Division 10th Air Defense Command
- German: Flak-Division 10; Luftverteidigungs-Kommando Nr. 10
- Active: April 1941 – 1945
- Country: Nazi Germany
- Branch: Luftwaffe
- Type: Flak
- Role: Anti-aircraft warfare
- Size: Division
- Engagements: Eastern Front; Siege of Sevastopol

The 10th Flak Division (German: Flak-Division 10) was a flak division of the Luftwaffe of Nazi Germany during World War II. It was active from April 1941 until 1945.

== History ==
The 10th Flak Division was formed in April 1941 in Ploiești in the Kingdom of Romania, initially under the name "10th Air Defense Command" (Luftverteidigungs-Kommando 10). Its main assignment was the protection of the Romanian oilfields in the larger Ploiești area. It initially contained the 180th and 202nd Flak Regiments, and was commanded by Johann Siefert.

The 10th Air Defense Command was renamed "10th Flak Division" on 1 September 1941. There was considerable pressure on the Luftwaffe to mobilize stationary flak divisions and free them up for service on the Eastern Front, where significant pressure laid on the Wehrmacht. In March 1942, it was replaced in Romania and sent to the Eastern Front, where it saw action in the Siege of Sevastopol. Its flak regiments were left behind, notably 180th Flak Regiment, which subsequently saw action during USAAF air raids at Ploiești. Both the 180th and 202nd Flak Regiments were later taken over by the 5th Flak Division (Kuderna).

In May 1942, the 10th Flak Division was in the Kursk area under the supervision of the 2nd Army of Army Group South (later: Army Group B). During this time, it contained the 153rd and 124th Flak Regiments. It was assigned between May 1942 and the end of that year to the I Flak Corps, along with the 9th, 15th and 17th Flak Divisions.

In 1943/44, the 10th Flak Division continued its service during the German withdrawals on the Eastern Front, first in southern Russia and later in Galicia, where it served as part of Army Group North Ukraine (later: Army Group A). On 30 June 1943, Franz Engel took command of the division. By 23 October, it was equipped with 25 heavy flak batteries as well as 28 medium and light flak batteries.

The 10th Flak Division surrendered to the Red Army at Königinhof on 8 May 1945. At the end of the war, Franz Engel was still in command of the division (although he had been briefly interrupted by Oskar Vorbrugg from 3–10 February 1945).
