= Werner Anton =

- Born: 3 April 1895
- Died: 12 September 1948 (aged 53)
- Military career
- Allegiance: German Empire (to 1918); Weimar Republic (to 1920); Nazi Germany
- Branch: Luftwaffe
- Rank: Generalleutnant
- Conflicts: World War I World War II
- Awards: Knight's Cross of the Iron Cross

Werner Rudolph Anton (3 April 1895 – 12 September 1948) was a German general in the Luftwaffe during World War II who commanded the 6th Flak Division. He was a recipient of the Knight's Cross of the Iron Cross.

== Awards and decorations ==
- Iron Cross (1914) 2nd Class (4 February 1915) & 1st Class (22 August 1918)
- Order of Albert the Bear, Knight's Cross 2nd Class with Swords Military Order of St. Henry (19 February 1916)
- Military Order of St. Henry (20 November 1916)
- Honour Cross of the World War 1914/1918 (21 December 1934)
- Anschluss Medal (16 December 1938)
- Wehrmacht Long Service Award 4th to 2nd Class (2 October 1936) & 1st Class (22 August 1939)
- Clasp to the Iron Cross (1939) 2nd and 1st Class
- Anti-Aircraft Flak Battle Badge (12 September 1942)
- German Cross in Gold on 29 April 1943 as Generalmajor and in the Flak-Division 6
- Knight's Cross of the Iron Cross on 11 June 1944 as Generalmajor and commander of 6. Flak-Division

Military offices
Preceded by Generalleutnant Job Odebrecht	Commander of 6th Flak Division; 1 September 1942 – 8 May 1945	Succeeded by None
