= 12th Flak Division =

- German: Flak-Division 12
- Active: 1 February 1942 – 9 May 1945
- Country: Nazi Germany
- Branch: Luftwaffe
- Type: Flak
- Role: Anti-aircraft warfare
- Size: Division
- Engagements: Eastern Front; Battle of Kursk; Operation Bagration; Battle of Berlin

The 12th Flak Division (German: Flak-Division 12) was a flak division of the Luftwaffe of Nazi Germany during World War II. It was active from early 1942 until 1945.

== History ==
The 12th Flak Division was formed in early 1942 (probably on 1 February 1942) in the central sector of the Eastern Front from the staff of the 9th Flak Brigade. It took over the former 9th Flak Brigade's air signals detachment, which became Air Signals Detachment 132 under command of the 12th Flak Division. It was the first newly-formed motorized flak division that was deployed in the field to provide additional combat strength on the Eastern Front, in this case to Army Group Center in the aftermath of the Battle of Moscow (1941/42). In May 1942, it was placed in charge of the air defense of the southern part of the army group, including the 2nd Army and 4th Army, by taking over the 21st, 34th and 101st Flak Regiment from 18th Flak Division. The initial divisional commander was Gotthard Frantz.

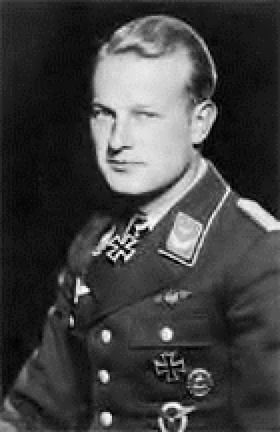
Ernst Buffa, divisional commander of the 12th Flak Division between 21 December 1942 and 15 April 1944

On 21 December 1942, Ernst Buffa replaced Frantz as divisional commander. In 1943/44, it received the 133rd, 125th and 35th Flak Regiments from the neighboring 18th Flak Division and in turn transferred the 34th and 101st Flak Regiments. It saw combat in the Demyansk sector and was at Bryansk, Oryol and Kursk in early 1943. At the Battle of Kursk, it fought for the 9th Army, as part of Luftflotte 6, and reported 383 downed Soviet aircraft. It was supported at Kursk by 10th Flak Brigade. In October 1943, it was placed under the supervision of II Flak Corps, along with the 18th Flak Division (at Orsha) and 10th Flak Brigade (at Vitebsk), later also joined by the 23rd Flak Division (Fichter). By the end of the year 1943, it was at Zboriv, still under the supervision of II Flak Corps (still under Luftflotte 6). In 1944, it saw action at Babruysk. After the destruction of Army Group Center, dubbed "Operation Bagration" on the Soviet side, the 12th Flak Division was initially at Baranavichy and later at Mława. During Bagration, the flak formations of the II Flak Corps had distinguished themselves in anti-tank warfare against Red Army tanks. Werner Prellberg replaced Buffa as divisional commander on 15 April 1944. Prellberg was later promoted to Generalleutnant during his tenure, on 1 August. The former divisional commander Buffa later received the Knight's Cross on 5 September 1944.

In 1945, it was at the Vistula estuary at Danzig, under supervision of the 2nd Army. On 10 April 1945, the 12th Flak Division was pulled out of the line for an intended redeployment to Swinemünde to eventually reach Luftgau VIII at Plzeň, but only managed to reach Berlin by war's end. Much of the division was destroyed in the Battle of Berlin until 2 May 1945, though remnants of the division managed to escape westwards, evade encirclement by the Red Army and surrendered to United States Army forces on 9 May.
