= Phoenix AG =

German manufacturing company

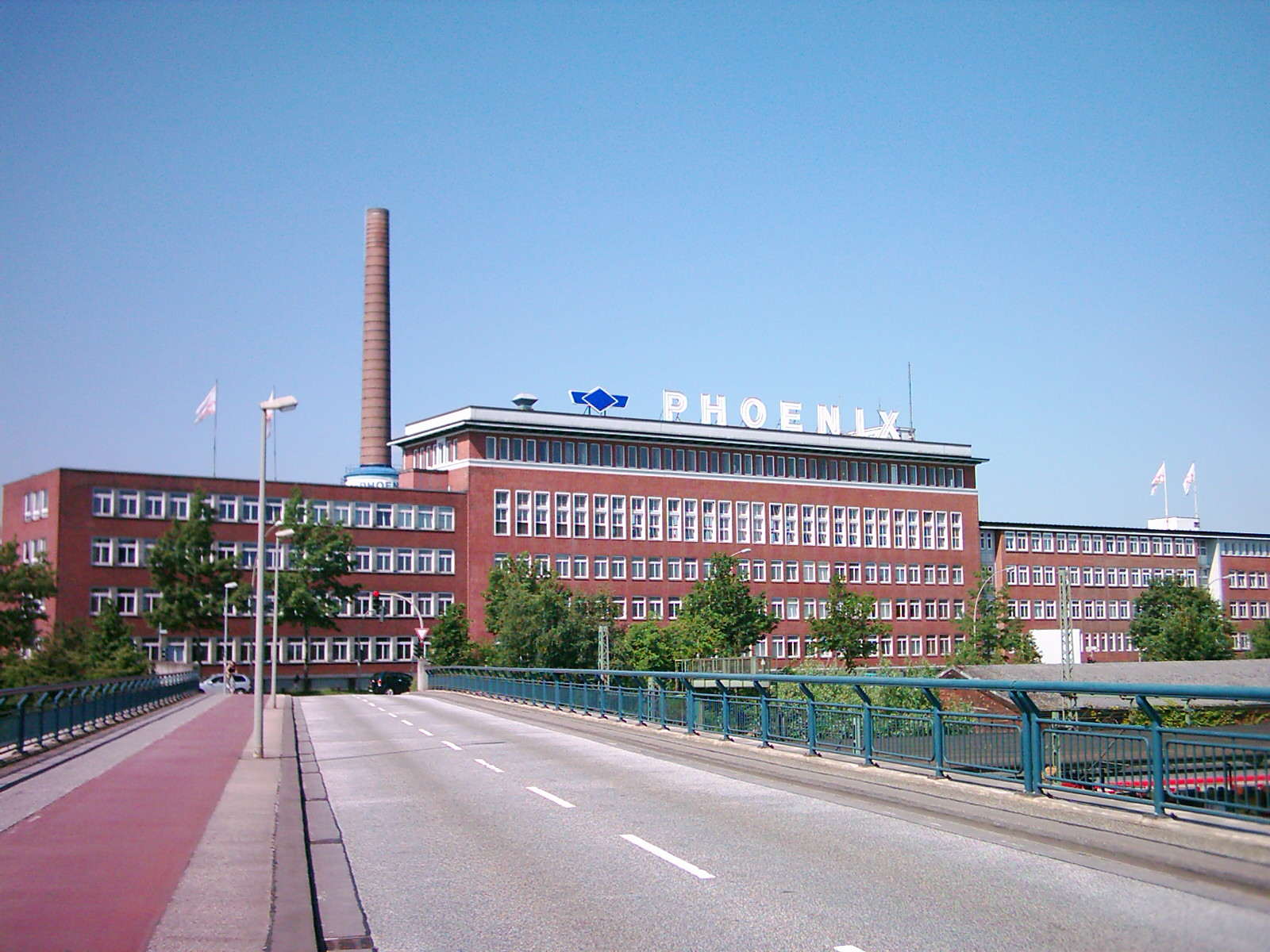
Phoenix headquarters in Harburg, Hamburg

Phoenix AG is an international company headquartered in Hamburg in Germany which specialises in products made of rubber, including sound and vibration insulation, conveyor-belt systems, and specialist industrial hose systems.

The company has a turnover in excess of €1 billion, and over 9,000 employees across 50 different operating sites. The company was founded in 1856, and was acquired by Continental AG in 2004.
