= 11th Flak Division =

11th Flak Division 11th Air Defense Command
- German: Flak-Division 11; Luftverteidigungs-Kommando Nr. 11
- Active: 1 February 1941 – 22 February 1944; September 1944 – May 1945
- Country: Nazi Germany
- Branch: Luftwaffe
- Type: Flak
- Role: Anti-aircraft warfare
- Size: Division
- Garrison/HQ: Bordeaux (1941); Nîmes (1943–44)

The 11th Flak Division (German: Flak-Division 11) was a flak division of the Luftwaffe of Nazi Germany during World War II. It was active twice, once from February 1941 until April 1944 and another time from September 1944 until 1945.

== History ==
On 1 February 1941, a command staff named 11th Air Defense Command (Luftverteidigungs-Kommando Nr. 11) to oversee the air defense of Luftgau Westfrankreich in German-occupied France was created from a previous command staff named Fortress Flak Commander III (Höherer Kommandeur der Festungs-Flak III). Initially, the formation was created without subordinate regiments. It was renamed "11th Flak Division" on 1 September 1941. The initial division HQ was stationed at Bordeaux, with Helmuth Richter as divisional commander.

In January 1943, it was moved to the southern France and deployed its HQ to Nîmes, from where it oversaw the 45th, 69th, 85th and 653rd Flak Regiments. This division command was upgraded on 22 February 1944 to become the III Flak Corps, which temporarily left the 11th Flak Division inexistent. On 1 November 1943, Erich Kressmann took command of the division. As of November/December 1943, the 11th Flak Division, then commanded from Pont du Gard (Nîmes), was deployed as part of Luftgau Westfrankreich under Luftflotte 3, along with 12th Flak Brigade, 13th Flak Division and 5th Flak Brigade.

A new 11th Flak Division was formed in September 1944 in Upper Silesia from the staff of the 15th Flak Brigade. It was deployed under air district Luftgau VIII and eventually placed under the supervision of I Flak Corps in April 1945. Towards the end of the war, it subsequently was in Cosel, Troppau and Mährisch-Ostrau, in Czechoslovakia. Here, it surrendered to the Red Army in early May 1945. Throughout its existence, the second 11th Flak Division was commanded by Oskar Krämer.
