= 3rd Flak Division =

3rd Flak Division (3rd) Air Defense Command Hamburg
- German: Flak-Division 3 Luftverteidigungs-Kommando (Nr. 3) Hamburg
- Active: 1 July 1938 – May 1945
- Country: Nazi Germany
- Branch: Luftwaffe
- Type: Flak
- Role: Anti-aircraft warfare
- Size: Division
- Garrison/HQ: Hamburg
- Engagements: Bombing of Hamburg in World War II; Operation Gomorrah

Commanders
- Notable commanders: Walter von Hippel; Alwin Wolz

The 3rd Flak Division (German: Flak-Division 3) was a Flak division of the Luftwaffe of Nazi Germany during World War II. Its primary function during the war was the defense of the airspace of the city of Hamburg, where it remained for the duration of the conflict. It was initially formed in 1938 and designated a division in 1941.

== History ==
The command staff of the Air Space Command Hamburg (Luftverteidigungs-Kommando Hamburg) was formed in Hamburg on 1 July 1938. The initial head of the air defense staff was Ottfried Sattler. It received the cardinal number 3 on 1 August 1939, making it 3rd Air Space Defense Command (Luftverteidigungs-Kommando Nr. 3 Hamburg). On 15 January 1940, Wolfgang Rüter assumed command of the division. On 1 September 1941, it was renamed to become the 3rd Flak Division (Flak-Division 3). On the same day, Theodor Spieß became divisional commander.

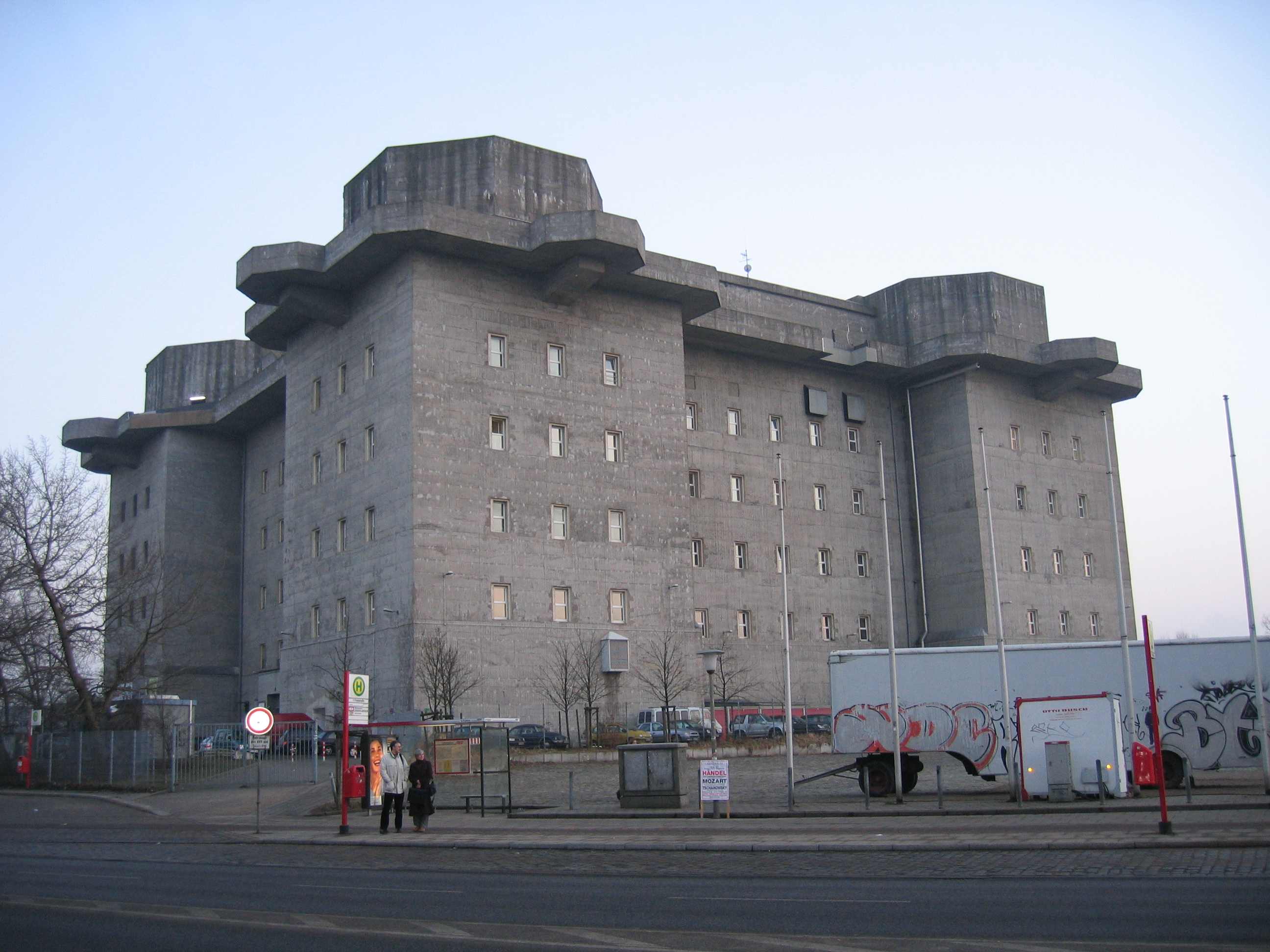
Flak tower at Hamburg-Heiligengeistfeld

For the entire rest of the war, the 3rd Flak Division remained in the area of greater Hamburg, where it provided the first line of defense against the Western Allied Bombings of Hamburg in World War II. The city of Hamburg was notable as one of only three cities (next to Berlin and Vienna) to be equipped with flak towers. Hamburg's flak towers were also operated by personnel of the 3rd Flak Division. The division sustained heavy damages during the Anglo-American attacks of August 1943 ("Operation Gomorrah"). By this point, the divisional commander was Walter von Hippel, who had taken command from Spieß on 1 July 1942 and who would be in turn succeeded by Alwin Wolz on 1 May 1944. Wolz remained in command during the heaviest stage of the Allied bombing campaign against Germany, in late 1944 and early 1945.

In 1944, the 3rd Flak Division consisted of the Flak Regiments 16, 51, 60 and 66, as well as the 161st Flak Searchlight Regiment, the 610th Searchlight Battalion, the 123rd Air Signal Battalion as well as a host of Divisional Supply Troops. The 16th Regiment was at the same time "Flak Group Hamburg South", the 51st Regiment was "Flak Group Hamburg North", the 60th Regiment was "Flak Group Hamburg East" and the 161st Searchlight Regiment was at the same time "Flak Searchlight Group Hamburg".

In May 1945, Hamburg was captured by the advancing British Army. The personnel of 3rd Flak Division surrendered and went into captivity. The final commander of the division had been Otto Stange, who had only assumed his post on 2 April 1945.
