= August Schmidt (Luftwaffe) =

- Born: 1 February 1883; Hildesheim, Hanover, Prussia, German Empire
- Died: 23 November 1955 (aged 72); Rotenburg an der Wümme, Lower Saxony, West Germany
- Military career
- Allegiance: German Empire (to 1918); Weimar Republic (to 1922); Nazi Germany
- Branch: Prussian Army (1901–1918); Reichsheer (1918–1922); Army (1935–1936); Luftwaffe (1936–1945)
- Service years: 1901–1922; 1935–1945
- Rank: General der Flakartillerie
- Commands: Luftgau VI
- Conflicts: World War I World War II: Battle of France; Defense of the Reich
- Awards: Knight's Cross of the Iron Cross

August Schmidt (1 February 1883 – 23 November 1955) was a highly decorated General der Flakartillerie in the Luftwaffe during World War II. He was also a recipient of the Knight's Cross of the Iron Cross. The Knight's Cross of the Iron Cross, and its variants were the highest awards in the military and paramilitary forces of Nazi Germany during World War II. Schmidt was captured by British troops on 8 May 1945. In October 1947 he was sentenced to life imprisonment because of war crimes committed against captured British airman. His sentence was later reduced to ten years, and in 1950 he was released for health reasons.

== Awards and decorations ==
- Iron Cross (1914)
  - 2nd Class (17 September 1914)
  - 1st Class (14 March 1917)
- Wound Badge (1914)
  - in Black
- Knight's Cross of the Royal House Order of Hohenzollern with Swords (12 April 1917)
- Knight's Cross Second Class of the Order of the Zähringer Lion with Swords (8 September 1917)
- Honour Cross of the World War 1914/1918 (1 November 1935)
- Iron Cross (1939)
  - 2nd Class (1 October 1939)
  - 1st Class (21 May 1940)
- German Cross in Gold (6 March 1944)
- Knight's Cross of the Iron Cross on 13 February 1945 as General der Flakartillerie and commander of Luftgau VI
- Order of the Cross of Liberty 1st Class with Swords (23 August 1942)
