= Heinrich Burchard =

- Born: 5 October 1894
- Died: 11 April 1945 (aged 50)
- Military career
- Allegiance: German Empire (to 1918); Weimar Republic (to 1933); Nazi Germany
- Branch: Luftwaffe
- Rank: General der Flakartillerie
- Commands: 7th Flak Division; 19th Flak Division
- Conflicts: World War II
- Awards: Knight's Cross of the Iron Cross (?)

Heinrich Burchard (5 October 1894 – 11 April 1945) was a general in the Luftwaffe of Nazi Germany during World War II who commanded several flak divisions. Burchard committed suicide on 11 April 1945.

== Awards and decorations ==
- Knight's Cross of the Iron Cross on 31 October 1944 as Generalleutnant and commander of the 7th Flak Division (Note: Walther-Peer Fellgiebel has struck Heinrich Burchard from the list of Knight's Cross recipients. He noted that Burchard never received the Knight's Cross but the German Cross in Gold on 15 March 1943 instead.)
