= Flak Corps =

A Flak Corps (German: Flakkorps, also spelt Flak-Korps) was a massed anti-aircraft (AA) artillery formation employed by the Luftwaffe for anti-aircraft, antitank, and fire support operations in World War II. A Flakkorps was a flexible organization that was made up of a varying number of AA regiments, brigades, or divisions. A total of six flak corps were organized by Germany during the war. The flak corps, while mainly intended to support ground units with concentrated anti-aircraft fire, in many cases provided also antitank support.

== History ==
Flak corps did not exist before World War II. Until the end of war Germany eventually organized a total of six flak corps, being numbered one through six in Roman numerals (I, II, III, IV, V, VI), plus one short-lived special flak corps.

=== I Flak Corps ===
I Flak Corps was formed twice, once in 1939 and once in 1941. The initial formation was assembled in October 1939 in Berlin from the staff of Luftgaukommando III. It was used in the Battle of France in support of Army Group A. On 16 August 1940, it consisted of the Flak Regiments 101, 102, and 104, as well as a heavy detachment, an air signals regiment and a resupply staff. On 1 June 1940, I Flak Corps was split into two brigades of two regiments each (after the addition of Flak Regiment 103), with 1st Flak Brigade receiving the Flak Regiments 102 and 103, and 2nd Flak Brigade receiving the Flak Regiments 101 and 104. In March 1941, I Flak Corps was used to form the staff "Luftwaffenbefehlshaber Mitte".

I Flak Corps was quickly reformed on 1 April 1941 in Berlin, using the staff of 1st Flak Brigade. By 6 June, it was in Warsaw. In Operation Barbarossa, it was used in Army Group Center with Panzer Group 2 and provided fire support using its Flak Regiments 101 and 104. It was also used by Army Group South. In May 1942, it was repurposed as an administrative leadership unit near Poltava and was assigned 9th Flak Division (at Kharkov), 10th Flak Division (at Kursk), 15th Flak Division (at Mariupol) and 17th Flak Division (at Stalino). 10th Flak Division was removed near the end of 1942. 9th Flak Division was annihilated in January/February 1943 in the cauldron of Stalingrad. I Flak Corps withdrew via southern Russia and Crimea in 1943 and through northern Ukraine and Galicia in 1944. In November/December 1943, it still contained the 9th, 10th, 15th and 17th Flak Divisions.

In October 1944, I Flak Corps was positioned at Kraków with Army Group A. At the end of the war, it was in Schweidnitz under Army Group Center.

=== II Flak Corps ===
II Flak Corps was formed twice, once in 1939 and once in 1943. The initial formation was assembled in October 1939 from elements of the 6th Air Division and was deployed near Mönchengladbach at the disposal of Army Group B for the Battle of France. In May 1940, it consisted of the Flak Regiments 103, 201, and 202, as well as an air signals regiments and a resupply staff. After the Battle of France, II Flak Corps was earmarked for Operation Sea Lion and prepared at the coast of the English Channel for operations. At this point, it supervised the Flak Regiments 6 (Ostende), 136 (Boulogne), 201 (Calais) and 202 (Dunkirk). Flak Regiment 103 had, after the victory over France, already been transferred to I Flak Corps, from where it was assigned to 1st Flak Brigade. After Sea Lion was cancelled, Flak Regiment 136 was withdrawn in October and the entire corps redeployed to Tours on 16 December 1940. It protected the German-occupied Atlantic coast with 6th Flak Brigade (at Fontenay le Comte), which in turn oversaw the Flak Regiments 40 and 45. On 3 March 1941, the II Flak Corps staff was recalled to Germany and deployed with Flak Regiment 6 and Flak Regiment General Göring to serve on the Eastern Front. II Flak Corps participated in the fighting around the Vyazma pocket between 2 and 13 October 1941, shooting down 29 Soviet aircraft, destroying or capturing 14 tanks, 17 bunkers, 104 heavy guns, 18 field fortifications, 5 nests of resistance, 94 machine gun positions, one freight train and 579 motorized vehicles. One Soviet cavalry squadron was destroyed, along with seven supply columns. 23 infantry attacks were repelled and 3,842 Soviet PoWs taken by the members of II Flak Corps. In April 1942, the corps staff was dissolved and used for the formation of 18th Flak Division.

II Flak Corps was reformed in central Russia in October 1943 from the command of III Luftwaffe Field Corps, headquartered at Babruysk and tasked with the supervision of 12th Flak Division (at Babruysk, provision of support for 2nd Army and 9th Army), 18th Flak Division (at Orsha, provision of support for 4th Army) and 10th Flak Brigade (at Vitebsk, provision of support for 3rd Panzer Army).

In November/December 1943, the II Flak Corps was part of Luftflotte 6, along with Feldluftgau XXVII and Luftwaffenkommando Südost, the latter hosting the German air force mission to Bulgaria. II Flak Corps itself still contained the 12th and 18th Flak Division, as well as the nascent 23rd Flak Division, which 10th Flak Brigade was being restructured into. During the great Soviet offensive of January 1945, the II Flak Corps oversaw a total of four flak divisions and an autonomous flak brigade (23rd Flak Division in support of 9th Army between Warsaw and Modlin, 12th Flak Division in support of 2nd Army between Modlin and Lomza, 18th Flak Division in support of 4th Army between Lomza and Ebenrode, 27th Flak Division in support of 3rd Panzer Army between Ebenrode and Rusnė, 15th Flak Brigade in reserves at Danzig). At the end of the war, the II Flak Corps was part of Army Group Vistula and oversaw, as of 27 April 1945, the 23rd Flak Division behind 9th Army, the 6th and 15th Flak Brigades as well as the 27th Flak Division behind the 3rd Panzer Army and the 14th Flak Division as well as the 16th Flak Brigade in the Prignitz region with the 12th Army.

=== III Flak Corps ===
The III Flak Corps was formed on 22 February 1944 from the staff of the 11th Flak Division to cooperate with Panzer Group West against an anticipated invasion by the Western Allies. It consisted of the Flak Assault Regiments 1 through 4 (formed from the Flak Regiments 431, 653, 37 and 79) as well as an air force signals detachment. Following the Allied invasion of Normandy (6 June 1944), much of the III Flak Corps' fielded flak forces were destroyed in the Falaise Pocket in August 1944. In September 1944, the staff of III Flak Corps was headquartered at Cochem and reused to oversee the 1st Flak Brigade, 18th Flak Brigade, 19th Flak Brigade and 20th Flak Brigade in support of Army Group B. In February 1945, the corps HQ was at Bonn and oversaw the 1st Flak Brigade (at Rheydt, in support of 15th Army), 2nd Flak Division (at Altenahr, in support of 5th Panzer Army) and the 19th Flak Brigade (at Kyllburg, in support of 7th Army). III Flak Corps was destroyed in the Ruhr pocket in April 1945.

=== IV Flak Corps ===
The IV Flak Corps was formed in Breslau in June 1944 to support Luftflotte 1 on the Eastern Front. Its initial deployment remained uncompleted and was aborted shortly after.

The deployment of IV Flak Corps was reattempted in September 1944, this time for the Western Front. It was deployed to Edenkoben and served in the sector of Army Group G between the Meuse river and the France–Switzerland border. It oversaw the 9th Flak Division (at Landstuhl, in support of 1st Army) and 13th Flak Division (at Schlettstedt (later: Todtnau/Schwarzwald), in support of 19th Army) and was reinforced in January 1945 by the insertion of 28th Flak Division between the two previous division. Additionally, in March 1945, it received the 21st Flak Division and 26th Flak Division in March 1945.

=== V Flak Corps ===
The V Flak Corps was formed under supervision of the "Luftwaffenkommando Südost" staff for the southern sector of the Eastern Front on 15 November 1944 to support the withdrawals of Army Group E and Army Group South. It initially was placed in charge of the 19th Flak Division in the Independent State of Croatia (in support of Army Group E), the 20th Flak Division in Pécs (in support of 6th Army, 3rd Hungarian Army and Army Group Fretter-Pico) and the 15th Flak Division at Debrecen (in support of Army Group Wöhler, 8th Army, 1st Hungarian Army).

Initially deployed east of Budapest, V Flak Corps was pushed to Bratislava by December 1944. After redeployment to Wiener Neustadt, V Flak Corps was also placed in charge of the air defenses of Wehrkreis XVII, including 24th Flak Division in Vienna and 7th Flak Brigade in Linz. On 2 April 1945, the corps was at Sankt Pölten and on 13 April at Traun. On 7 May 1945, the corps goes into captivity at Admont.

=== VI Flak Corps ===
The VI Corps was formed on 10 February 1945 in the north of the Western Front, the sector of Army Group H, from the dissolved 16th Flak Division at Doetinchem. It initially oversaw 9th Flak Brigade (at Huis ter Heide in support of 25th Army) and 18th Flak Brigade (at Winkel in Guelders in support of 1st Parachute Army) as well as 4th Flak Division (at Duisburg). During the withdrawal of the German forces in Northwest Germany from the Rhine towards the Elbe, VI Flak Corps additionally was placed in charge of 3rd Flak Division (at Hamburg) and 8th Flak Division (at Bremen).

=== Flak Corps z.b.V. ===
The Flak Corps z.b.V. was formed on 2 April 1945 from the Luftgau-Kommando VI staff, initially formed on 12 October 1937. Luftgau VI was dissolved in early April 1945 after it had passed the 4th Flak Division to VI Flak Corps and 7th Flak Division to III Flak Corps. Its staff was used to form a reserve staff for a flak corps.

== Organization ==
Flak corps were large organizations of pre-existing AA units (regiments, brigades, and divisions) rather than being formed as new units from scratch. In 1943 Allied intelligence noted:

The Flak Corps is a wartime organization, and constitutes an operational reserve of the commander in chief of the German Air Force. It combines great mobility with heavy fire power. It can be employed in conjunction with spearheads composed of armored and motorized forces, and with nonmotorized troops in forcing river crossings and attacking fortified positions. It can also be deployed as highly mobile artillery to support tank attacks.

Flak corps did not include the majority of the Germany's flak force. Even considering only the Luftwaffe's flak units dedicated to direct support of Wehrmacht ground troops, most of them were not subordinated to flak corps.

Flak corps were either partially motorized or fully motorized, depending on the degree of motorization of their subordinate units.

== Assessment ==
Although the AA guns of all nations in World War II could be used against ground targets, Germany in particular used AA guns in multiple roles. The need for command and control of these assets led to the organization of larger units, culminating with the organization of flak corps. Although the Soviets also organized large air defense units, they were typically not used against ground targets. The flak corps above all provided additional antitank support for the German ground forces. In some cases, such as at Cagny in Normandy, these units achieved significant success against attacking Allied armored vehicles. The use of flak corps as ground warfare assets was complicated because they were part of the air force (Luftwaffe) chain of command even when supporting ground forces (either Heer or Waffen SS).

Given the expense of producing AA guns – in relation to the cost of antitank guns of the same capabilities – it is questionable if their use as antitank weapons was economical.

As an organizational form, massed AA-gun formations represented a dead-end as large-caliber AA guns were phased out of military service in the 1950s and replaced by surface to air missiles.

== See also ==
- Flak division
