= Battle of Dompaire =

1944 battle fought between France and Germany

- Part of World War II
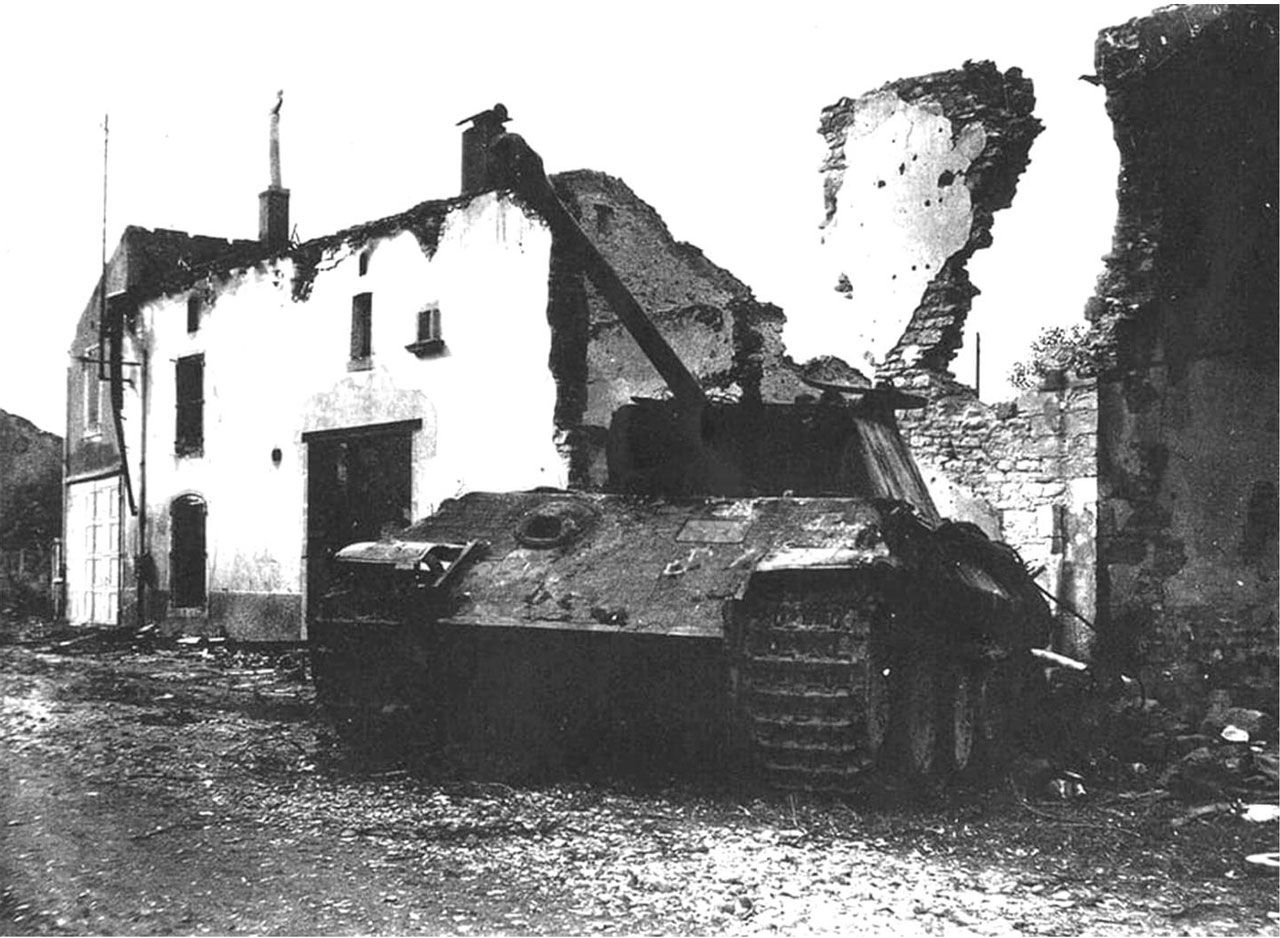
- Panther tank knocked out in the village of Madonne-et-Lamerey during the battle
Date	12–13 September 1944
Location	vicinity of Dompaire, France 48°13′21″N 6°13′23″E
Result	Allied victory

Belligerents
France; United States	Germany

Commanders and leaders
Paul de Langlade	(Nazi Germany) Horst von Usedom (Nazi Germany) Hans von Luck

Strength
Groupement Langlade: 60–80 tanks; (United States) 406th Fighter-Bomber Group	(Nazi Germany) 112th Panzerbrigade: 90 tanks

Casualties and losses
44 killed 7 tanks destroyed 1 fighter bomber	350 killed 1,000 wounded 69 tanks destroyed

The Battle of Dompaire was fought between French and German armoured forces near the town of Dompaire in France. It took place between 12 and 14 September 1944 during the Lorraine campaign on the Western Front of World War II. The battle saw a new German Panzer brigade hastily set up by the Wehrmacht to stop the Allied advance after the collapse of the Normandy front, and a unit of the French 2nd Armoured Division under General Philippe Leclerc.

The inexperienced 112 Panzer Brigade suffered from a series of ambushes by French armoured units with American air support. The French tank crews and US fighter bombers combined destroyed much of the German brigade with few casualties in return. The Germans were forced to fall back which delayed a planned counter-offensive in Lorraine.

== Background ==
The French 2nd Armoured Division under the command of General Philippe Leclerc de Hauteclocque entered combat during the final stages of the Battle of Normandy where it inflicted heavy losses on the 9th Panzer Division at Alençon. After the breakout in mid August the division headed towards Paris, and on 24 August after sporadic clashes on the outskirts of the capital against German rearguards, they were able to liberate the capital. After a brief stay there, General Charles de Gaulle then assigned it to the new French 1st Army being formed in Provence under the command of General Jean de Lattre de Tassigny. By then the division had the most experience out of all French units, being all US supplied: tanks, weapons, supplies, uniforms and equipment. It was made up of veterans of over three years of war, mainly from the old French formations stationed in her African colonies.

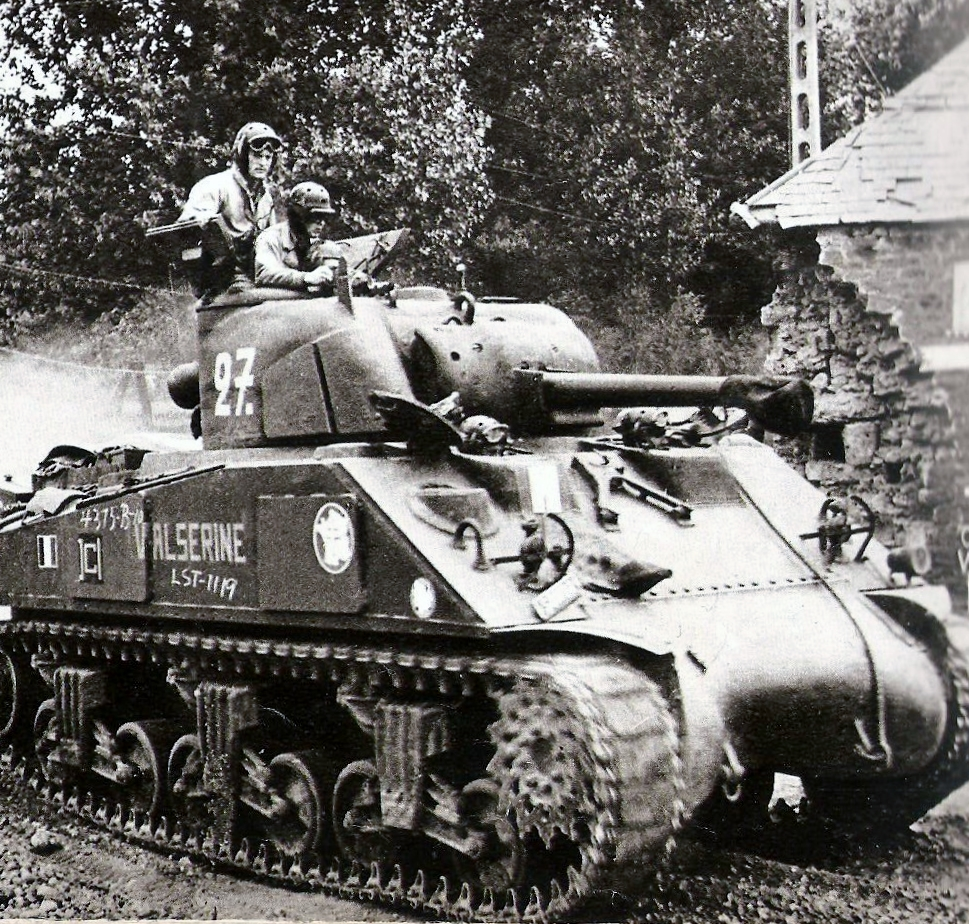
M4 Sherman tank of the 2nd French armoured Division during the closing of the Falaise Pocket in Normandy August 1944

Leclerc had managed to persuade SHAEF to keep his division within the American army, mainly for political reasons. His division was then sent to Lorraine as part of General Wade H. Haislip's US XV Corps. General George Patton's US Third Army had achieved significant successes during the first week of September. It had seized important bridgeheads on the Moselle north and south of Nancy. Nevertheless the Allied advance began to slow as it outstripped its supplies and as German defences progressively strengthened. The unexpected Franco-American advance towards the Moselle put the German High Command in difficulty; Hitler and OB West were trying to assemble a substantial mechanized force to mount a counterattack in the Lorraine area. Patton's army was beginning to suffer from a serious shortage of supplies, especially fuel, partly due to General Dwight D. Eisenhower's decision to give precedence in supplies to Field Marshal Bernard Montgomery's 21st Army Group, which was preparing to launch Operation Market Garden.

On 8 September 1944, the 106th Panzer-brigade attempted a counter attack between Mairy and Briey to try and block General Walton Walker's US XX Corps advance towards the Moselle, but were repelled with heavy losses. Two days later the 2nd French Armoured Division split into three Groupement tactique groups – the first, 'Groupement Langlade' led by Colonel Paul de Langlade, led the French advance towards Epinal. Further north, the other two battle groups, 'Groupement Dio' and 'Groupement Billotte' were supporting the US 44th Infantry Division and the 79th Infantry Division respectively. 'Groupement Langlade' consisted of one mechanized infantry battalion the Régiment de marche du Tchad (in M3 half-tracks) and two tank battalions – the 12e régiment de chasseurs d'Afrique and the 501e Régiment de chars de combat. These were also divided into three groups, named after their commanders, Jacques Massu, Joseph Putz and Pierre Minjonnet. Each one was made up of a few infantry companies riding in M3 half-tracks, sixteen M4 Sherman tanks and three or four M10 Wolverine tank destroyers.

=== French and German advances ===
'Groupement Langlade' probed forward towards Vittel splitting the German defences, and seized the town on 11 September capturing many prisoners. Around the same time, the Germans under Generals Johannes Blaskowitz and Hasso von Manteuffel had moved their armoured forces to try to block the allied advance. The latter hearing of the French advance decided to ignore Hitler's order – he instead ordered Colonel Horst von Usedom's 112th Panzer brigade to divide into two groups to recapture Vittel. On the evening of 12 September, from their base at Epinal, the 1st battalion Panzer-Regiment 29, which consisted of around 45 Panzer V Panther tanks, had entered the town of Dompaire west of Epinal. The other group, Panzer Battalion 2112, consisting of 45 Panzer IV tanks, had advanced westwards towards the town of Darney.

Leclerc had set up his command post east of Vittel soon after its liberation. 'Groupement Langlade' continued east and laagered that night just short of Dompaire and Damas-aux-Bois – the latter a village about two miles southeast of Dompaire. There French civilians had warned about a German advance towards the area. The Germans meanwhile had moved westward but had failed to reconnoiter. The other group of the 2nd Armoured were to the north and south, where the reconnaissance unit of Lieutenant Colonel Nicolas Roumiantsoff were covering the right flank.

Despite their powerful armour, the German armoured troops were inexperienced, having been formed of very young, although highly enthusiastic, recruits. In addition, compared to allied forces, the Germans lacked air support and adequate artillery units.

== Battle ==
Langlade intended to send 'Groupe Massu' commanded by Lieutenant Colonel Jacques Massu, to attack the Germans concentrated in Dompaire which lay in a narrow valley. 'Groupe Minjonnet', led by Lieutenant Colonel Pierre Minjonnet, on the right intended to strike from Ville-sur-Illon to Damas which held the main road between Dompaire and Epinal. They would also occupy the partly wooded hills, around Dompaire and with these dominant positions Langlade could use his artillery against targets further downstream.

=== Dompaire ===
On the evening of 12 September, the German tanks had reached Dompaire – Von Usedom sent the Panther tank battalion to move on and around the positions between the town and the villages of Madonne-et-Lamerey where unknowingly they were exposed from the west. He only had with him six anti-tank guns and five howitzers at his disposal. Much further to the southeast the Panzer IV tank battalion remained stationary inside Darney; the tank crews were sheltering from the rain that fell during the night. This meant that the two tank battalions were not in contact with each other. Von Usedom hoped that this weather would ground Allied aircraft.

The French, having taken up positions without any difficulty, intended to take the Germans by surprise. 'Groupe Massu', had advanced to the hills south and south-west of Dompaire to take control of the town. The crews of forty Shermans and seven M10s spent the hours in the darkness refuelling and rearming. In the dark on the southwestern outskirts, a French reconnaissance group from the Fourth Tank Squadron led by Lieutenant Jean Bailaud first came into contact with the Germans. In a short engagement, one Panther, which happened to be the command tank, was knocked out along with two anti-tank guns. In return one Sherman was knocked out and another damaged. The French withdrew, which allowed the Germans to continue making their way to the South West of Dompaire. Both sides traded shots as darkness fell, while French artillery fired on all entrances to the village to block all possible movement. At the same time Langlade had arranged to receive Allied air support.

Meanwhile 'Groupe Minjonnet' at Ville-sur-Illon sent out a reconnaissance in force towards Damas. A contingent of the Régiment Blindé de Fusiliers-Marins, manned by French navy personnel led by Lieutenant Durville in three tank destroyers named Siroco, Mistral and Simoun, advanced towards the village but found no resistance. When they entered the suburbs they faced a group of Panther tanks. In the exchange of fire, two Panzers were hit and knocked out, forcing the Germans to retreat, while the French had lost two jeeps and a half-track. The French then withdrew to Ville-sur-Illon, placing artillery batteries along the partly wooded hills South of Dompaire.

The following morning, French infantry with support from five Shermans, forced the Germans out of the nearby village of Lavieville. After that, the troops made their way to Dompaire itself – the French had the town almost surrounded. Meanwhile Panther tanks had advanced south of Madonne-et-Lamerey on hilly and wooded terrain towards the eastern outskirts of the town. The French had deployed their M10 tank destroyers of the Régiment blindé de Fusiliers-Marins on the slopes ready to ambush. Two tank destroyers Orage and Tempête soon spotted and struck three Panthers 900 meters away, immediately halting the German advance. Furthermore, French 105mm howitzers of 'Groupe Minjonnet' began to bombard the Germans, and the Groupe then attacked Damas, seizing it in less than two hours. Following this, they were able to advance out of the town and force the Germans out of the hamlet of Maison Rouges, capturing fifty Germans. As a result the French cut the main road between Dompaire and Epinal.

=== US air support ===
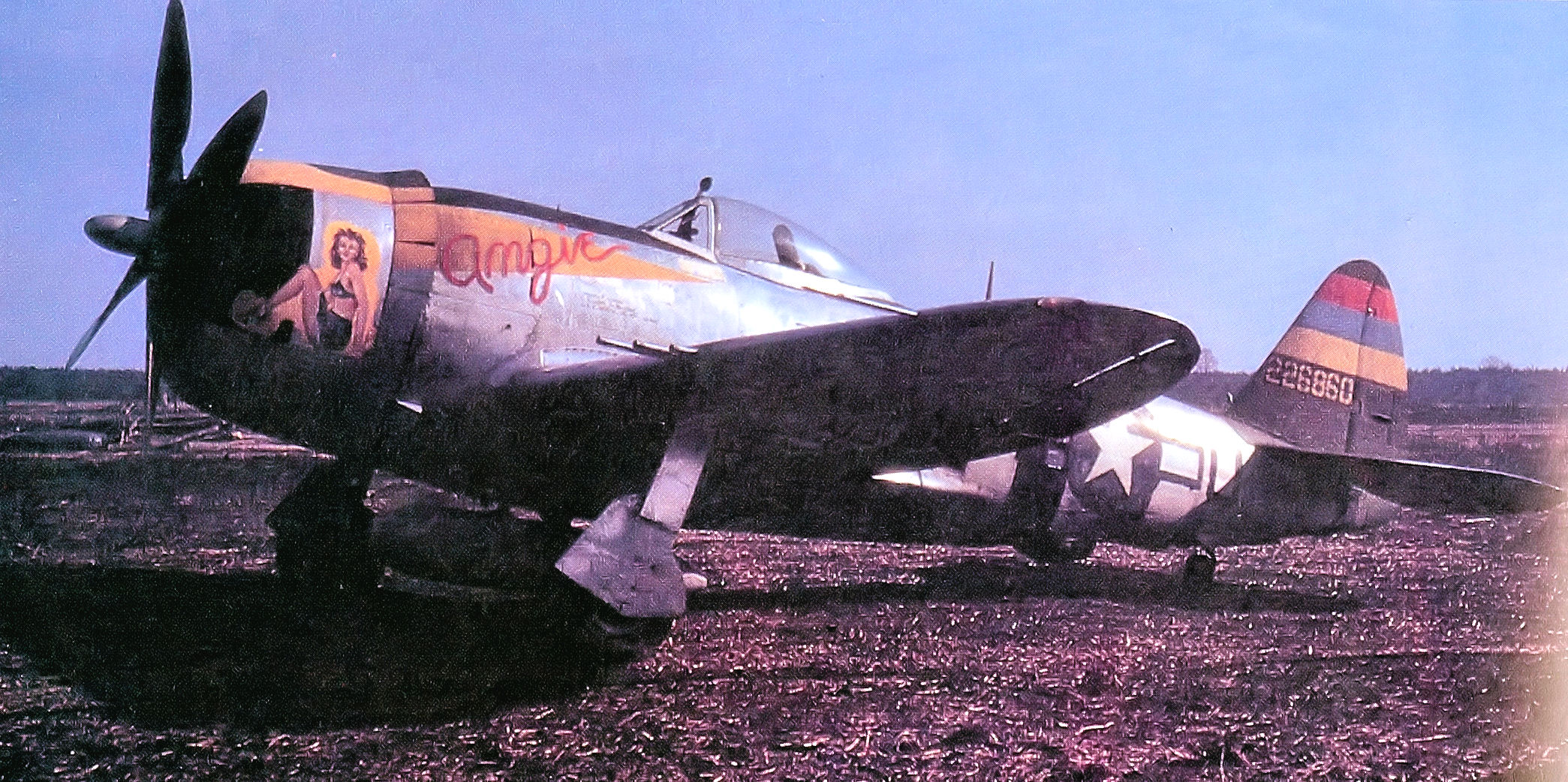
P-47 Thunderbolt from the 406th Fighter-Bomber Group

The US Tactical air liaison (TALO) communications tank commanded by US officer Colonel Tower was assigned to 'Groupement Langlade'. He had organised with Massu the coordination of air support from RAF Hawker Typhoons, but they were already airborne and 'booked' on another mission. Instead, he was able to coordinate attacks by P-47 Thunderbolt fighter-bombers of the 406th Fighter-Bomber Group from XIX Tactical Air Command. At 8 am the P-47D Thunderbolts attacked the Panzers at Madonne-et-Lamerey with rockets, bombs, and machine-gun fire, with devastating results; according to the French the attack disorganized the German column and at least eight tanks were severely damaged, destroyed, or abandoned. The town was also severely damaged.

The French mechanized groups attempted to encircle the Germans inside Dompaire by occupying the main roads. A column of M4 Sherman tanks from Lavieville advanced to the western outskirts of Dompaire. By now, other armoured vehicles and a platoon of M10s had climbed the hills towards Bouzemont behind the Germans. Durville's tank destroyers destroyed two more Panthers, while the rest of 'Groupe Minjonnet' blocked the road to Epinal.

At 11 am, 13 September, P-47 fighter-bombers launched the second of what would be four attacks. The French used flares to identify the targets and, despite some problems distinguishing them from the French armoured vehicles on the outskirts of Dompaire, the attacks further disorganized the German forces, which ended up in panic. Many young tankers tried to escape by abandoning their vehicles.

=== Ville-sur-Illon ===
The situation of the Panther battalion was now critical. The Panzer IV tank battalion, along with the Panzer Grenadiers stationed in Darney, was called on to help, advancing from the south towards Dompaire.

As they advanced, the Germans soon put the French in difficulty; 'Groupe Minjonnet' was in danger of being attacked from two sides, and Colonel Langlade's command post, in the village of Ville-sur-Illon on the heights south of the town, was right in the path of the Germans. A German bombardment hit the headquarters of Langlade, causing some confusion. The French spotted the Germans around 13:30, but the Panzer Grenadiers decided to plunder a supply depot they encountered along the road, losing contact with the Panzers as a result. Langlade reacted quickly and organized an improvised artillery barrage along the main road assisted by a small number of M4 Shermans of the 12e Régiment Chasseurs d'Afrique, M10 tank destroyers and anti-tank guns. The leading Panzer IV tanks ran into the barrage first of machine gun fire, then of armour-piercing rounds and immediately suffered losses: the Shermans shot at the tracks of the armoured vehicles, firstly to immobilize them and then hit them on the sides. Two German tanks were destroyed at close range, and three more were knocked out in an ambush by M10s. Meanwhile the German infantry had arrived on the field but were pinned down by French machine-gun fire from two French jeeps. Langlade decided to evacuate his command post first to Gelvecourt before rejoining with the bulk of 'Groupe Minjonnet' who were deployed near Dompaire. Leclerc meanwhile received news about the ongoing battle and was concerned. Nevertheless 'Groupement Billotte' under seasoned armoured veteran Pierre Billotte (in 1940 at the village of Stonne he led Char B1 heavy tanks which destroyed thirteen Panzers) was brought in from the north in support; he agreed with Langlade and Massu not to fall back, and to continue to engage the Germans.

=== German retreat ===
Meanwhile, the Panther tank battalion blocked in Dompaire had suffered two more air attacks by P-47's in the afternoon which inflicted further damage. The German Panzers with small groups of tanks to the south and east made a series of weak attacks to try to break through the circle established by the French on the high ground. These attempts turned out to be costly – the German tanks were surprised and hit on the flanks at close range by the French armoured vehicles of 'Groupe Massu' and 'Groupe Minjonnet'. They had carefully positioned themselves on the slopes of the hills, and hidden well amongst the pines and apple trees for a well aimed killing ground.

By the end of the day the German armoured brigade had lost most of its armour – the blockaded Panther tank battalion at Dompaire still only had four tanks available, while the Panzer IV battalion that had attacked Ville-sur-Illon had lost most of their tanks, and the accompanying Panzer grenadiers had been pushed back. They were left in action with only seventeen tanks.

The German survivors had abandoned Dompaire having left by the north. Massu then entered Dompaire, which had been heavily damaged in the fighting; and the French found the remains of thirty-three German tanks destroyed, thirteen of which were hit by armoured vehicles. Sixteen Panthers were made inactive in some way by air attacks, as well as four abandoned intact. Langlade now reinforced by 'Groupe Putz' then retook Ville-sur-Illon later that evening finding it abandoned.

=== Von Luck's counterattack ===
The German command managed to organise a relief column to von Usedom's armoured brigade at Dompaire. On 14 September, Colonel Hans von Luck attempted to advance westward from Hennecourt with a kampfgruppe made up of tanks and panzer-grenadiers from the 21st Panzer Division. 'Groupe Minjonnet' had also been reinforced by 'Groupe Putz' north of Ville-sur-Illon. At Hennecourt the Germans were quickly pinned down by field artillery. The Panzer IV company struck towards Damas, but lost five tanks in quick succession and were forced to withdraw. Another attack towards Maison Rouge was also repelled. After these failures, the German command decided to give up further attacks – the kampfgruppe fell back together with the survivors of the 112th Panzer brigade, retreating towards Epinal. Von Luck intended to save his forces for the counter-offensive in Lorraine ordered by Hitler.

== Aftermath ==
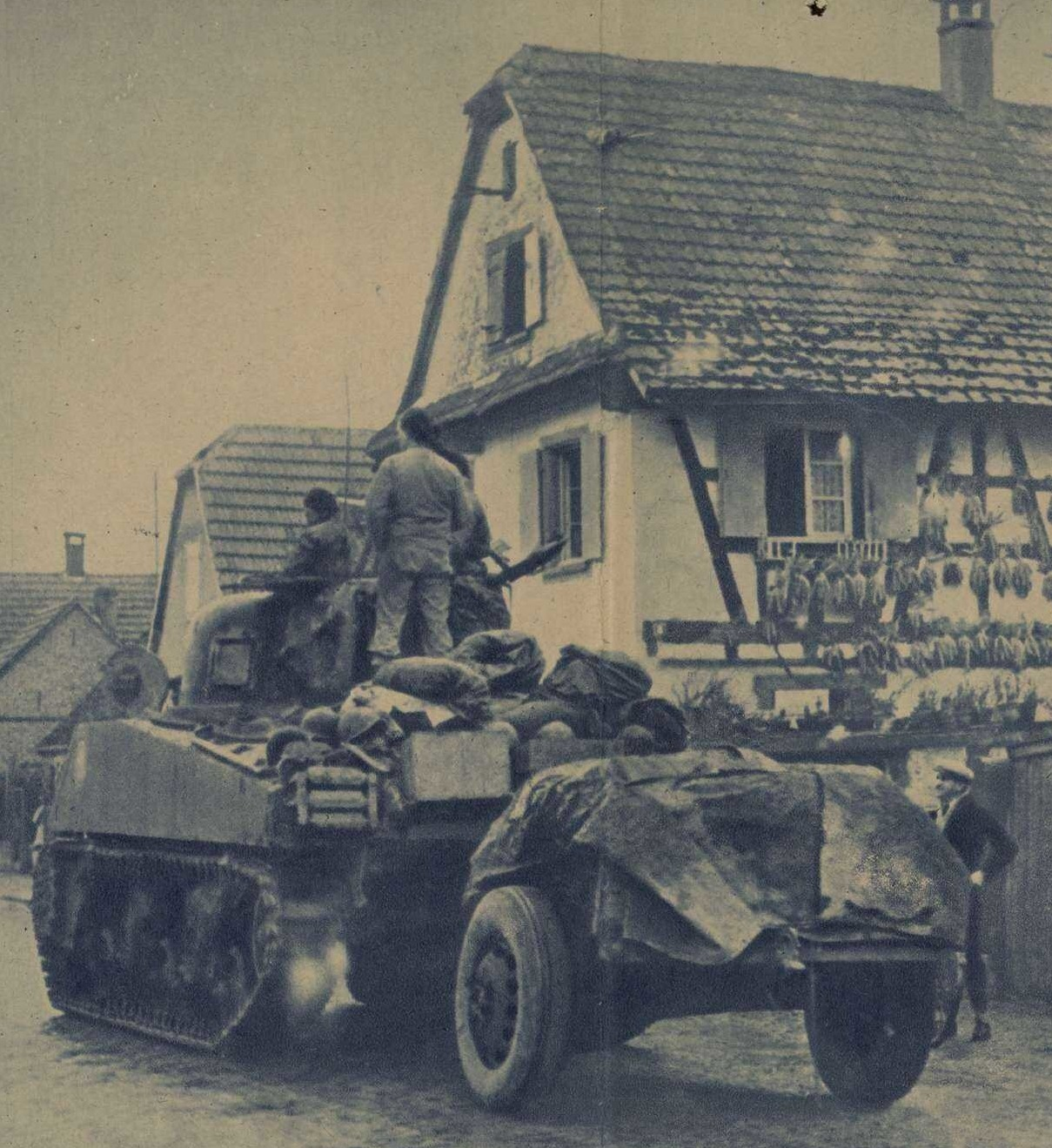
French 2nd Armoured Division Sherman at Blaesheim during the liberation of Alsace in November 1944

The French consolidated their gains and examined the destruction. Much to their surprise they found a number of abandoned intact tanks two of which were Panthers. The French inspected the tanks and discovered that they were of very recent production; having emerged from the MAN factory in Nuremberg at the end of July, and delivered on 15 August. One Panther 'AusF 332' which was captured intact in the main street of Dompaire was put on display outside Hôtel National des Invalides in Paris.

For the Germans Dompaire saw the near destruction of a valuable Panzer brigade. At the end of the two days of fighting the 112 Panzer brigade went down from 90 operational tanks to 21 armoured vehicles capable of fighting. German High Command admitted the loss of 34 Panthers and 26 Panzer IVs and upwards of 350 dead, 1,000 wounded and several guns. Army Group G wrote in its daily report on 13 September of "unbelievably high losses". In terms of tanks – they took the heaviest losses of any single day of fighting on the Western Front. 112 Panzer Brigade never recovered and what was left was absorbed into the 12th Panzer Division.

At SHAEF the German attack demonstrated that for the first time since D-Day, German withdrawal operations were being bolstered by new and unknown units. For Leclerc's 2nd Armoured Division the victory at Dompaire was a huge morale booster. It had practically destroyed a German armoured brigade equipped with latest model Panzers, and demonstrated the tactical ability of its commanders and the experience and combativeness of its men. Silver Stars were awarded to Langlade and six other French soldiers, while twenty-five other members of the division received the Bronze Star. Losses were low; five M4 Sherman medium tanks, two M5 light tanks, two jeeps, two half-tracks and 44 dead. The contribution of the air support provided by the US fighter-bombers was also important, having destroyed or forced the abandonment of a significant number of German tracked vehicles for the loss of only one P-47. Haislip stated this was a 'brilliant example' of effective air-land cooperation.

From an operational point of view, the German defeat and subsequent retreat also had important strategic consequences: Haislip's XV Army Corps was able to reach the Moselle river by 17 September. As result a German infantry division was surrounded by a converging French and American columns, while the remnants of the German LXIV Army Corps were forced to withdraw. Two days later Haislip and his forces crossed the Moselle and advanced south of Lunéville, aligning with the other two US corps of Patton's 3rd Army which were already east of the river. Despite the defeat at Dompaire, Hitler did not modify his plans and ordered Blaskowitz and von Manteuffel to counter-attack Patton's army north of Lunéville. From 19 to 22 September, another armoured clash took place at the battle of Arracourt which ended with another German defeat, this time against the American armoured units. The French 2nd Armoured would continue its fight with the US XXI Corps ending at Berchtesgaden in Southeastern Germany by wars end.

=== Legacy ===
The Panther (Panzerkampfwagen V Ausführung G) 'AUS F 332' survived the war and was placed outside Les Invalides until it was restored in the 1970s. It now resides today in the Musée des Blindés in Saumur.

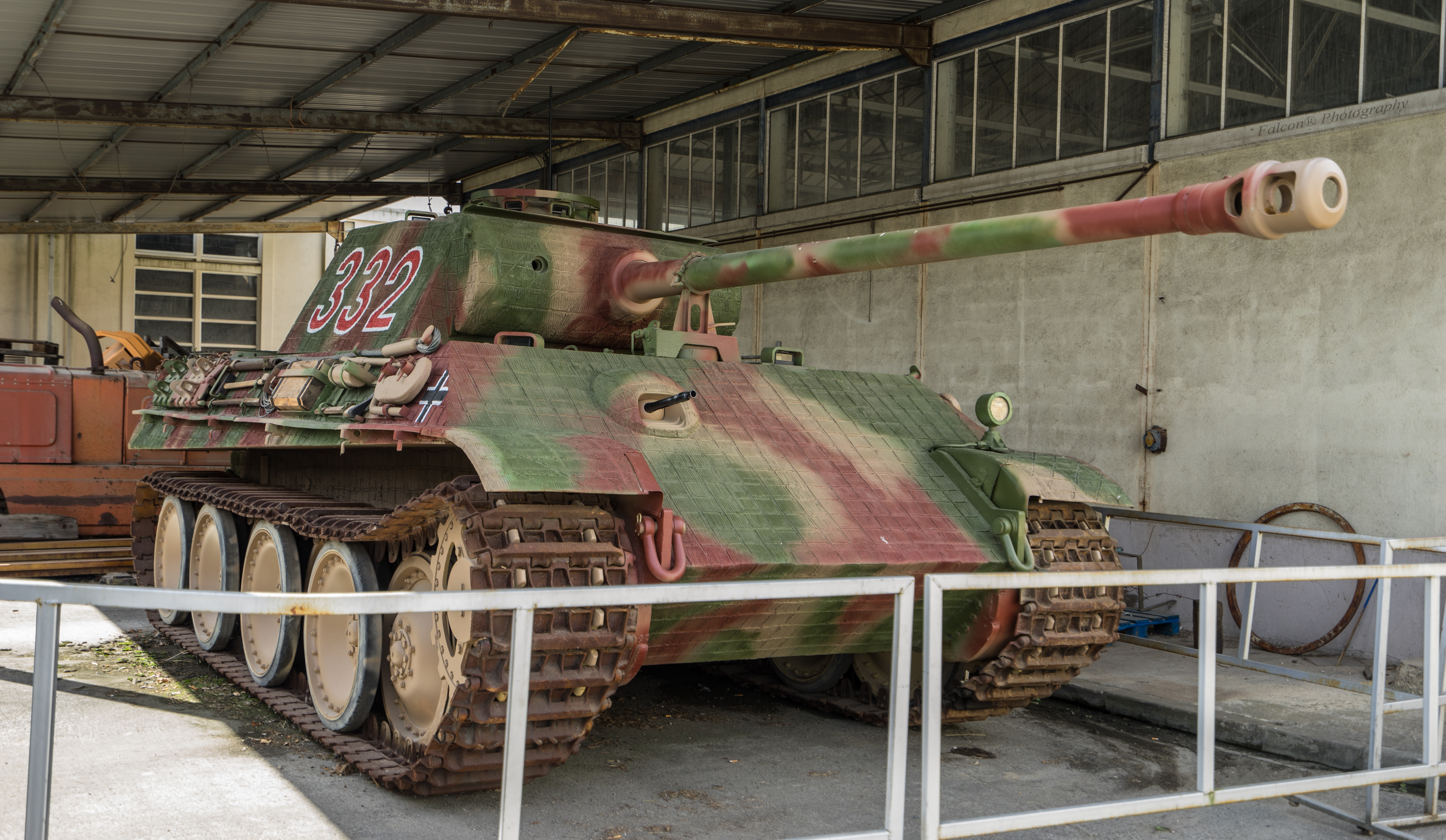
Panther tank 'AUS F 332' captured at Dompaire by the French, now on display at the Musée des Blindés in Saumur

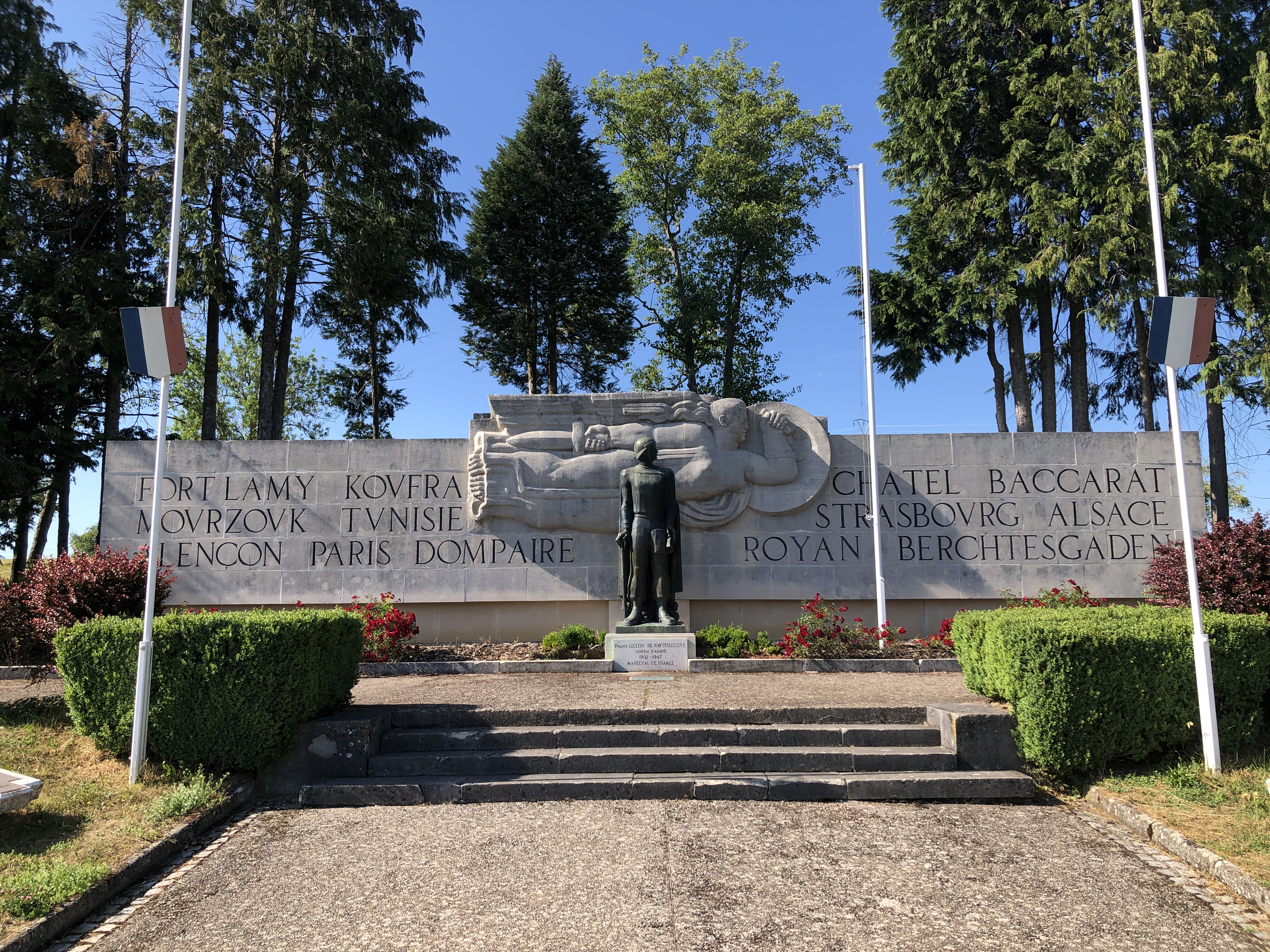
Monument to the battle at Madonne-et-Lamerey

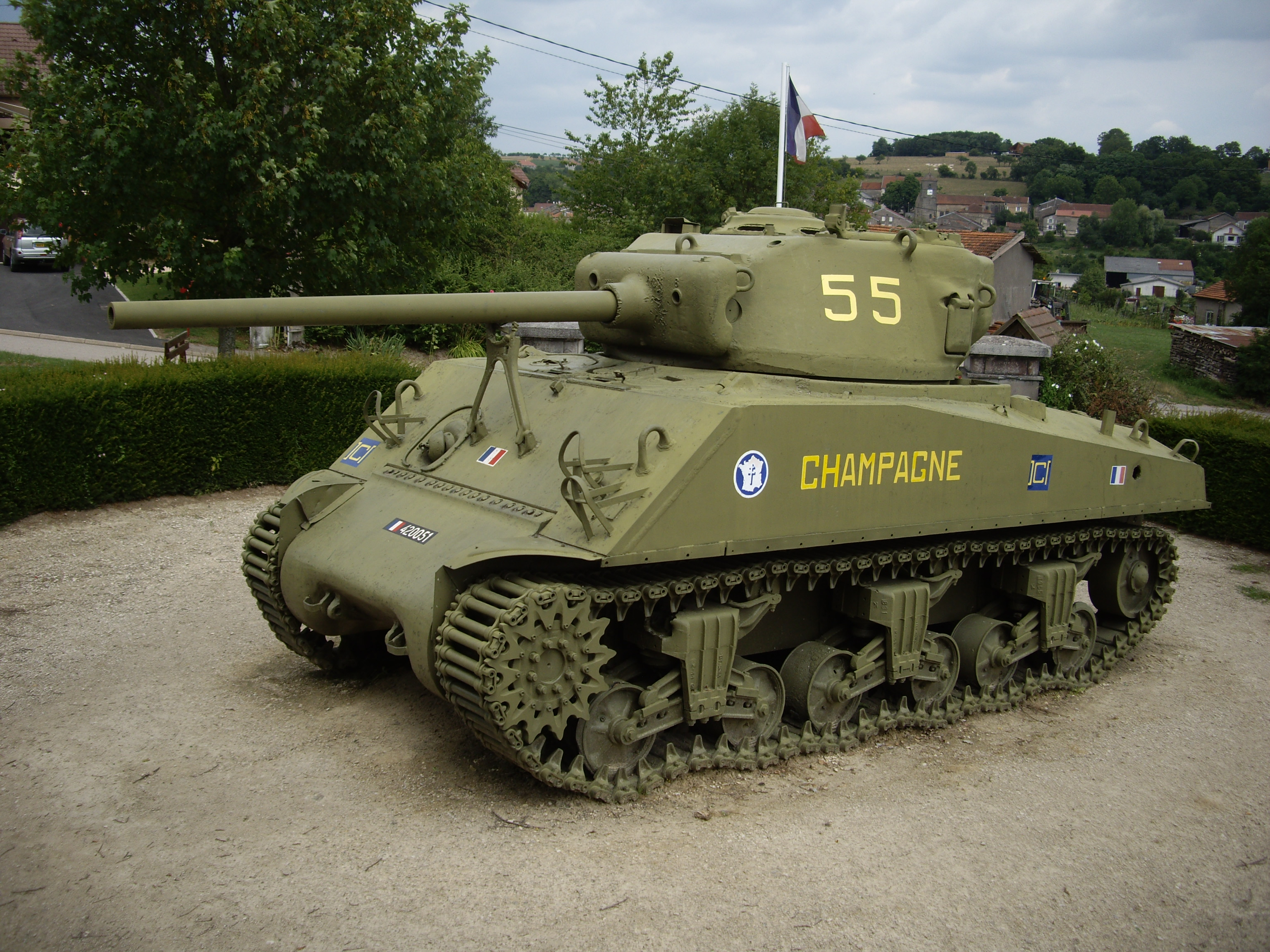
Sherman tank "Champagne", preserved at Ville-sur-Illon, near Dompaire. It was knocked out during the battle - notice hole on right

== Bibliography ==
- Ludewig, Joachim; Zabecki, David T (2012). Rückzug The German Retreat from France, 1944. University Press of Kentucky. ISBN 9780813140803.
- Giziowski, Richard John (1997). The Enigma of General Blaskowitz. Leo Cooper. ISBN 9780850525540.
- Jarymowycz, Johann (2001). Tank Tactics From Normandy to Lorraine Roman. L. Rienner. ISBN 9781555879501.
- Moore, William Mortimer (2011). Free France's Lion The Life of Philippe Leclerc, de Gaulle's Greatest General. Casemate Publishers (Ignition). ISBN 9781612000800.
- Salbaing, Jacques (1997). La victoire de Leclerc à Dompaire (in French). Muller. ISBN 9782904255267.
- Robinson, Merlin; Seignon, Thomas (2018). Division Leclerc The Leclerc Column and Free French 2nd Armored Division, 1940–1946. Bloomsbury Publishing. ISBN 9781472830067.
- Steidl, Franz (2008). Lost Battalions - Going for Broke in the Vosges, Autumn 1944. Random House. ISBN 9780307537904.
- Sullivan, John J (2003). Air Support for Patton's Third Army. McFarland Incorporated. ISBN 9780786414659.
- Zaloga, Steven J (2013). Lorraine 1944 Patton Versus Manteuffel. Bloomsbury Publishing. ISBN 9781472802095.
