= Johann von Ravenstein =

German general in the Wehrmacht during World War II

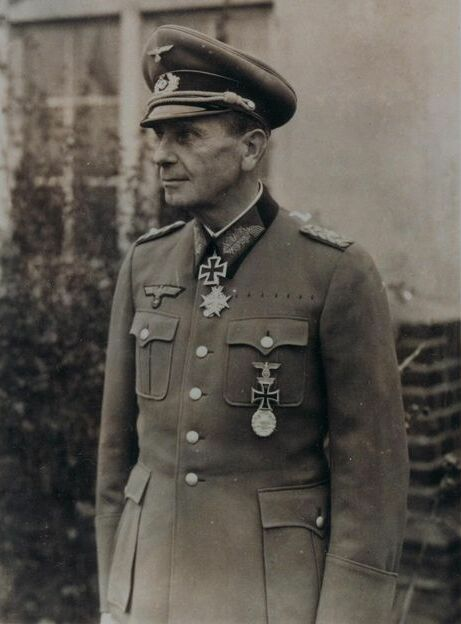
- Ravenstein, c. 1942
- Born: 1 January 1889; Strehlen, German Empire
- Died: 26 March 1962 (aged 73); Duisburg, West Germany
- Military career
- Allegiance: German Empire (to 1918); Weimar Republic (to 1933); Nazi Germany
- Branch: Army
- Service years: 1909–1945
- Rank: Generalleutnant
- Commands: 5th Light Division; 21st Panzer Division
- Conflicts: World War I World War II: Invasion of Poland; Battle of France; Operation Battleaxe; Operation Crusader
- Awards: Pour le Mérite; Knight's Cross of the Iron Cross

Johann "Hans" Theodor von Ravenstein (1 January 1889 – 26 March 1962) was a German general (generalleutnant) in the Wehrmacht during World War II. He commanded the 21st Panzer Division from May 1941 until being made a prisoner of war in late November 1941. He was a recipient of the Knight's Cross of the Iron Cross.

A professional soldier on the outbreak of World War I, Ravenstein fought as an infantry officer on the Western Front. Awarded the Pour le Mérite in 1918, he participated in the border disputes with Poland after the war before leaving the military. After attending university, he obtained employment with an electrical company and then later with the Duisburg city administration. In 1934, he joined the Heer (Army) branch of the Wehrmacht. He led a rifle regiment in the Invasion of Poland and the Battle of France. In May 1941, he was appointed commander of the 5th Light Division, at the time operating in North Africa. His command was soon redesignated as the 21st Panzer Division. He was captured by soldiers from the Intelligence section, 21 Battalion, 2nd New Zealand Division during the British Eighth Army's Operation Crusader.

The first German general to be captured by Allied forces during World War II, Ravenstein was held in a series of prisoner of war camps in Egypt, South Africa, Canada and lastly in Wales. Repatriated to Germany in 1947, he found employment with the Düsseldorf Corporation before returning to Duisburg to again work for the city's administration. He died of a heart attack in 1962 at the age of 73.

== Early life ==
Johann Theodor von Ravenstein was born in Strehlen, near Breslau, on 1 January 1889 into a family with a military tradition. His father was an officer in the Silesian Hussars and an ancestor was an adjutant to Generalfeldmarschall Blücher (Note: Translating to field marshal in English, a generalfeldmarschall is considered to be the equivalent in rank of a general of the army in the United States Army.) during the Napoleonic Wars. He had a harsh upbringing; his father had a major head injury while Johann was young and this affected his interactions with his children. Eventually his mother left his father, later obtaining a divorce in 1893, and raised Ravenstein and his sister on her own.

Despite an early interest in becoming a pastor in the Lutheran Church, Ravenstein began a military education in 1899 when he entered Wahlstatt Cadet School. He went onto the Cadet Academy in Berlin in 1903. During his time there, he made the acquaintance of Kaiser Wilhelm II while occasionally serving as a page at the Neues Palais (New Palace) at Potsdam. Following graduation from the Cadet Academy in 1909 he was posted to the King's Grenadier Regiment, stationed at Liegnitz, as a leutnant (second lieutenant). The same year he met his future wife, Elisabeth von Oriola, who was from an aristocratic Silesian family of Portuguese descent.

== World War I ==
After two years at Liegnitz, Ravenstein transferred to the 155th Infantry Regiment as a battalion adjutant officer. On the outbreak of World War I, his regiment marched into Belgium and he fought in the Battle of Longwy on 22 August 1914. He subsequently saw action in the Battle of Verdun. In 1915 he was promoted to oberleutnant and was soon commanding a company in his regiment. Apart for periods of leave, he served continuously on the Western Front throughout the war. He proposed to Elisabeth in 1917 and married her early the following year while on leave.

Ravenstein was selected for a training course in general staff duties and, after completion, joined the General Staff of the Imperial German Army. He soon sought a return to the frontlines and rejoined the 155th Infantry Regiment which was to soon be involved in the third phase of the German spring offensive. In the Third Battle of the Aisne in May 1918, Ravenstein was given command of his regiment's 1st Battalion and led it through the opposing line. Shortly afterwards, with only a small squad of men, he captured a bridge over the Aisne near Chemin des Dames. Later in the battle, he was in charge of a patrol which executed an ambush of a French battalion, routing it completely. Pushing on with his battalion towards the Marne, his troops eventually took 1,500 prisoners and captured in excess of 30 field guns and machine guns. For his accomplishments, Ravenstein received the Pour le Mérite on 9 June.

Promoted to hauptmann (captain), Ravenstein was posted to the Imperial Guard as a battalion commander. He was serving at the Kaiser's headquarters when the war ended. Attached to the Freikorps from 1919, he was engaged in defending against Polish incursions along the border in the east of Germany. When the border disputes settled, he decided to leave the military rather than stay in the newly formed Reichsheer. He was discharged on 31 March 1920 having received an honorary promotion to the rank of major.

== Interwar period ==
Entering a university at Essen, he graduated in 1921 with a degree in administration. He secured employment with a large electrical company and was soon transferred to Duisburg. He made the acquaintance of the city's mayor, Dr. Karl Jarres, who, in 1926, offered him a role as the manager of the Duisburg tramway system. He was a success in the role and Jarres soon moved Ravenstein to his mayoral office as director of public relations. By this stage of his career, he had adopted his sister's daughter.

Ravenstein lost his job when Jarres lost his mayoralty in 1933. As an anti-Nazi, he found it hard to secure employment so in 1934 he rejoined the army as a major attached to the 2nd Battalion of the 60th Infantry Regiment. On 1 October 1936 he was promoted to oberstleutnant (lieutenant colonel) and shortly afterwards was given command of the 4th Rifle Regiment, 1st Light Division, based at Iserlohn. He led the regiment when it was involved in the occupation of Sudetenland, having been promoted oberst (colonel) in August 1938. The following year the regiment was part of the occupation force that marched into Czechoslovakia.

== World War II ==
The 1st Light Division was involved in the Polish campaign as part of the 10th Army. After the end of the fighting in Poland, the division's structure was considered inadequate and it was re-organised as the 6th Panzer Division. Ravenstein remained in command of his regiment and led it through the Battle of France. At one stage, having crossed the Meuse and Oise Rivers and accompanied by several panzers, his regiment captured the headquarters of the French 9th Army although its commander, General Henri Giraud, was away at the front at the time. As a result of his regiment's endeavours, Ravenstein was awarded the Knight's Cross of the Iron Cross.

The campaign in France concluded, Ravenstein was appointed commander of 16th Rifle Brigade, 16th Panzer Division, and was sent to the Balkans. During his time there he was briefly part of the German Military Mission to Romania and later, after the Battle of Greece, was a liaison officer at the court of King Boris III of Bulgaria. On 20 May 1941, he was promoted to generalmajor (Note: In the Wehrmacht, the rank of generalmajor was equivalent to a brigadier general in the United States Army.) and appointed commander of the 5th Light Division, which was serving in Libya as part of Generalleutnant Erwin Rommel's Afrika Korps. (Note: A generalleutnant was equivalent to the rank of major general in the United States Army.)

=== North Africa ===
Ravenstein arrived in North Africa a few days later to take up command of the 5th Light Division and was almost immediately brought into action when the British commenced Operation Battleaxe. Ordered by Rommel to attack the flank of the British advance, his division performed well, inflicting severe damage to the 7th Armoured Brigade, and threatening encirclement of the 7th Armoured Division and the Indian 4th Infantry Division.

After the battle, Ravenstein's division was redesignated the 21st Panzer Division although it did not receive any additional units to its order of battle. For the next few months, the Afrika Korps built up its stores in preparation for offensive operations against Tobruk and during this period Ravenstein went on leave to Rome.

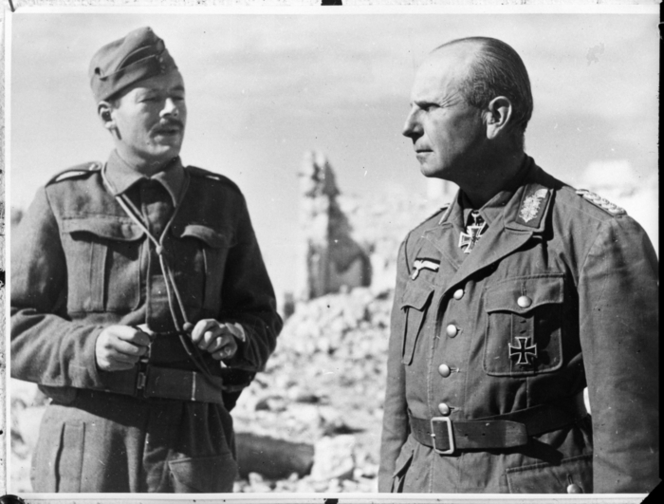
Ravenstein, on the right, after his capture by soldiers of New Zealand's 21st Battalion, with a British staff officer at Tobruk, Libya

In the evening of 18 November 1941, the British Eighth Army commenced Operation Crusader, intended to relieve the Siege of Tobruk. Ravenstein's division, located to the west of Bardia, was soon engaged in counterattacks during which his command vehicle was struck by gunfire. By 26 November his command was reduced to 22 tanks. While traveling in a staff car on 28 November 1941 to visit the headquarters of the neighbouring 15th Panzer Division with an orderly and driver, Ravenstein was ambushed by soldiers of 21st Battalion, 2nd New Zealand Division, near Point 175. One of his companions was wounded when the New Zealanders opened fire and the trio surrendered. Taken back to battalion headquarters, it was discovered that one of their captives was a general. Ravenstein was promptly taken into Tobruk and maps he was carrying were helpful in preparing against forthcoming attacks by the 21st Panzer Division. He was the first German general to be made a prisoner of war by Allied forces in the war.

=== Prisoner of War ===
Ravenstein was transported by ship from Tobruk but it was sunk by an Italian torpedo bomber and he was rescued by a British corvette after spending two hours in the sea. Taken to Alexandria, he was held in a series of prisoner of war camps, firstly in Egypt, then South Africa and later in Ontario, where he spent the majority of the war. While a POW, he was promoted to generalleutnant on 1 October 1943. After the war, he was transferred to a POW camp in Bridgend, Wales, which was designated for senior German officers. He soon developed heart problems and was medically repatriated to Germany in November 1947.

== Later life ==
Settling back in Iserlohn with his wife Elisabeth, Ravenstein secured a job with the Düsseldorf Corporation. In 1951, he and his wife moved to Duisburg, where he took up employment again with the city's administration. He eventually retired in 1954. Soon afterwards he declined an offer from King Farouk of Egypt to command his country's army. An active Christian throughout his life, he was involved in the Lutheran Church in addition to other civic and charitable organisations. While attending church in Duisburg, he died on 26 March 1962 of a heart attack.

== Notes ==
=== Citations ===
Military offices
Preceded by Generalleutnant Karl Böttcher	Commander of 21st Panzer Division; 20 May 1941 – 29 November 1941	Succeeded by Oberstleutnant Gustav-Georg Knabe
