= 12th Panzer Division (Wehrmacht) =

German army division during World War II

- 12. Panzer-division; — 12. PzDiv —
- Unit insignia 1941–1943
- Active: 10 January 1941 – 8 May 1945
- Country: Nazi Germany
- Branch: German Army
- Type: Panzer
- Role: Armoured warfare
- Size: Division
- Part of: Army Group North
- Garrison/HQ: Wehrkreis II: Stettin
- Engagements: World War II; Operation Barbarossa; Siege of Leningrad; Battle of Kursk; Operation Bagration; Courland Pocket

Commanders
- Notable commanders: Fedor von Bock

Insignia
- Original insignia

- Insignia from summer 1943

The 12th Panzer Division was an armoured division in the German Army, established in 1940.

In October 1940 the 2nd Motorised Infantry Division was reorganized as the 12th Panzer Division, and in June 1941 it joined Operation Barbarossa, fighting in the battles of Minsk and Smolensk. It fought the rest of the war on the Eastern Front and surrendered to the Red Army in the Courland Pocket in May 1945.

== History ==
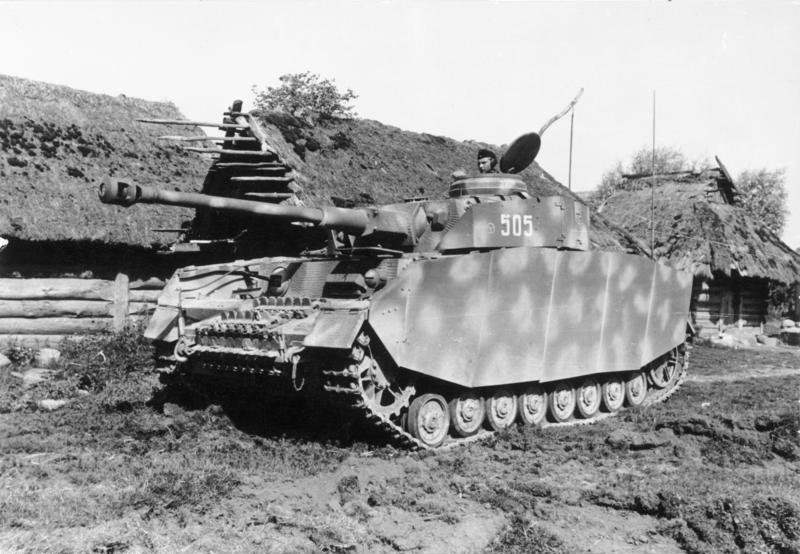
A Panzer IV of the division operating on the Eastern Front in 1944.

The division was formed from the 2nd Infantry Division, itself formed in 1921. The division was motorised in 1936–37 and participated in the invasions of Poland and France. It was reorganised as a Panzer Division in October 1940.

The 12th Panzer Division participated in Operation Barbarossa, taking part in the drive towards Leningrad. Suffering heavy casualties during the Soviet counter offensive in the winter of 1941–42, the division was withdrawn to Estonia for a refit. It remained with Army Group North for the most part of the war except for a brief spell south while participating in the battle of Kursk in July 1943 and the following defensive operations and retreat after the German failure. The division returned to the northern sector in January 1944 but came too late to play any role in the unsuccessful German efforts to prevent the Siege of Leningrad from being broken by the Red Army.

When the major Soviet summer offensive ("Operation Bagration") against Army Group Centre began on 22 June, 12th Panzer Division was identified as one of the available formations for a potential counterattack. Adolf Hitler had promised a major relief operation with several armored divisions to relieve the growing Minsk pocket and ordered Army Group North to detach the 12th Panzer Division (its largest remaining armored formation) for this purpose; 5th Panzer Division of Army Group North Ukraine was called upon for a similar purpose. At this point in time, the 12th Panzer Division was already critically understrength; the panzer reconnaissance detachment and Flak detachment that were usually part of a German panzer division's order of battle were already no longer present in late June 1944. The combat strength of the division laid in its sole remaining panzer detachment (II./Pz.Rgt.29), then equipped with a total of 44 tanks of the types Panzer III and Panzer IV. Delays in military transport weakened available forces further, restricting the strength of the division in the critical area to a sole battalion of the 25th Panzergrenadier Regiment as well as one panzer company. The major counterattack that Hitler had personally ordered 12th Panzer Division to undertake was thus a thrust of an incomplete mechanized infantry battalion supported by 10 medium tanks. The attack nonetheless scored unexpected successes due to the surprise imposed on the Soviet forces of 1st Belorussian Front; when the attacking elements went to the offensive on 1 July at 02:00 at night, Soviet infantry were bluffed into the belief that they indeed faced a German panzer division in force. In a small attack from Maryina Horka towards Babruysk, a small corridor was struck southeastwards, uniting at Svislach with an attack by the encircled German forces. 35,000 of the 70,000 trapped German soldiers flooded the rescue corridor, usually only equipped with small arms and leaving their major equipment behind. Soviet formations attempted to interrupt the rescue; some 25,000 German soldiers eventually broke through into the region southwest of Minsk, leaving the pocket behind them.

The division was eventually entrapped in the Courland Pocket after the successful Soviet offensive in July 1944, Operation Bagration. It remained in Courland where it surrendered to Soviet forces in May 1945.

== Organization ==
Structure of the division through its history:

- Headquarters
- 29th Panzer Regiment
- 5th Panzergrenadier Regiment
- 25th Panzergrenadier Regiment
- 2nd Panzer Artillery Regiment
- 22nd Motorcycle Battalion (later became 2nd Panzer Reconnaissance Battalion)
- 508th Tank Destroyer Battalion
- 303rd Army Anti-Aircraft Battalion (later added in 1942)
- 2nd Divisional Supply Group

== Commanding officers ==
The commanders of the division:

- Lieutenant general Fedor von Bock, 1931
- Major General/Lieutenant General Hubert Gerke, 1 October 1934
- Major General/Lieutenant General Paul Bader, 1 April 1937
- Generaloberst Josef Harpe, 5 October 1940
- Generalleutnant Walter Wessel, 15 January 1942
- Generalleutnant Erpo Freiherr von Bodenhausen, 1 March 1943
- Generalmajor Gerhard Müller, 28 May 1944
- Generalleutnant Erpo Freiherr von Bodenhausen, 16 July 1944
- Oberst Horst von Usedom, 12 April 1945

== See also ==
- Organisation of a SS Panzer Division
- Panzer division
