= Erpo Freiherr von Bodenhausen =

German general (1897–1945)

- Born: 12 April 1897
- Died: 9 May 1945 (aged 48); Reichskommissariat Ostland
- Military career
- Allegiance: Nazi Germany
- Branch: Army
- Rank: Generalleutnant
- Commands: 12th Panzer Division; L Army Corps
- Conflicts: Courland Pocket
- Awards: Knight's Cross of the Iron Cross

Erpo Freiherr von Bodenhausen (12 April 1897 – 9 May 1945) was a German general who commanded the 12th Panzer Division during World War II. He was a recipient of the Knight's Cross of the Iron Cross of Nazi Germany. Bodenhausen committed suicide on 9 May 1945 in the Courland Pocket.

== Awards ==
- Iron Cross (1914) 2nd Class (12 October 1915) & 1st Class (6 October 1917)
- Wound Badge (1914) in Black (27 September 1918)
- Clasp to the Iron Cross (1939) 2nd Class (22 September 1939) & 1st Class (30 September 1939)
- Panzer Badge in Bronze (1 November 1940)
- German Cross in Gold on 31 January 1942 as Oberstleutnant in Schützen-Regiment 28
- Knight's Cross of the Iron Cross on 17 December 1943 as Generalmajor and commander of 12. Panzer-Division

Military offices
Preceded by Generalleutnant Walter Wessel	Commander of 12. Panzer-Division; 1 March 1943 – 28 May 1944	Succeeded by Generalmajor Gerhard Müller
Preceded by Generalmajor Gerhard Müller	Commander of 12. Panzer-Division; 16 July 1944 – 12 April 1945	Succeeded by Oberst Horst von Usedom
Preceded by General der Gebirgstruppe Friedrich-Jobst Volckamer von Kirchensittenbach	Commander of L. Armeekorps; 12 April 1945 – 9 May 1945	Succeeded by None
