= Walter Wessel =

WW2 Nazi general (1892-1943)

- Born: 21 April 1892; German Empire
- Died: 20 July 1943 (aged 51); Morano, Italy
- Military career
- Allegiance: German Empire; Weimar Republic; Nazi Germany
- Branch: Army
- Service years: 1912–1943
- Rank: Generalleutnant
- Commands: 12th Panzer Division
- Known for: Ciepielów massacre
- Conflicts: World War II
- Awards: Knight's Cross of the Iron Cross with Oak Leaves

Walter Wessel (21 April 1892 – 20 July 1943) was a general in the Wehrmacht of Nazi Germany during World War II who commanded the 12th Panzer Division. He was a recipient of the Knight's Cross of the Iron Cross with Oak Leaves. Wessel was responsible for the Ciepielów massacre in Poland. He was killed in an car accident on 20 July 1943 near Merano, Italy.

== Awards and decorations ==
- Knight's Cross of the Iron Cross with Oak Leaves
  - Knight's Cross on 15 August 1940 as Oberst and commander of Infanterie-Regiment 15 (mot.)
  - 76th Oak Leaves on 17 February 1942 as Oberst and commander of Infanterie-Regiment 15 (mot.)

Military offices
Preceded by Generaloberst Josef Harpe	Commander of 12. Panzer-Division; 15 January 1942 – 1 March 1943	Succeeded by Generalleutnant Erpo Freiherr von Bodenhausen
