= Georg von Bismarck =

German general during World War II

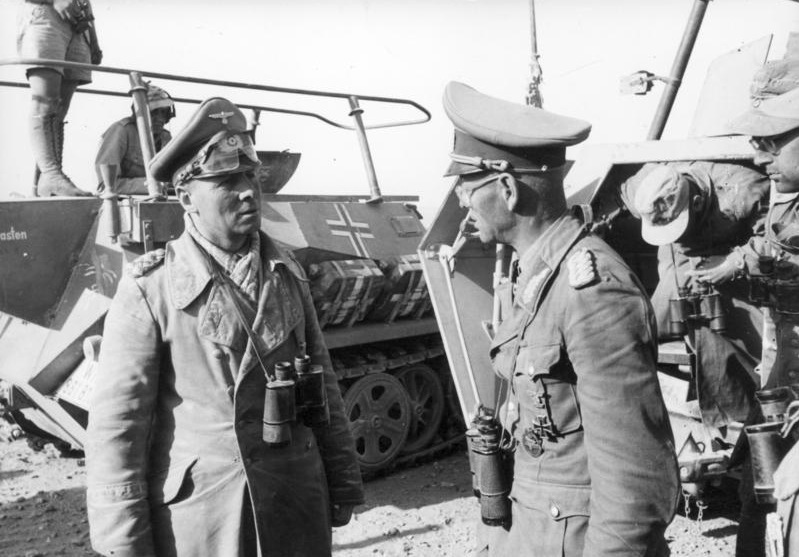
- Bismarck (right) with Erwin Rommel
- Born: 15 February 1891; Neumühl, Province of Brandenburg, Kingdom of Prussia, German Empire
- Died: 31 August 1942 (aged 51) near El Alamein
- Burial place: Tobruk
- Military career
- Allegiance: German Empire; Weimar Republic; Nazi Germany
- Branch: German Army
- Service years: 1910–1942
- Rank: Generalleutnant (posthumously)
- Commands: 20th Panzer Division; 21st Panzer Division
- Conflicts: World War I; World War II; Invasion of Poland; Battle of France; Operation Barbarossa; North African Campaign; Battle of Gazala; Battle of Alam el Halfa
- Awards: Knight's Cross of the Iron Cross

Georg von Bismarck (15 February 1891 – 31 August 1942) was a German general during World War II who commanded several divisions. He was a recipient of the Knight's Cross of the Iron Cross of Nazi Germany.

== Life ==
Von Bismarck joined the army in 1910 and took part in World War I. During the interwar years he served as an officer in the Reichswehr. During World War II, Bismarck took part in the Invasion of Poland in September 1939. During the Battle of France in 1940, he commanded a motorized infantry regiment of Erwin Rommel's 7th Panzer Division.

In 1941, he was promoted to commander of the newly formed 20th Panzer Division. He led the division during Operation Barbarossa on the Eastern Front as a part of Army Group Centre. In January 1942 he was transferred to Africa to serve in the Africa Korps as commander of the 21st Panzer Division. Here he again served under Rommel.

== Death ==
Generalmajor von Bismarck was killed by a mine while leading the 21st Panzer Division in the Battle of Alam el Halfa on 31 August 1942.

== Awards ==
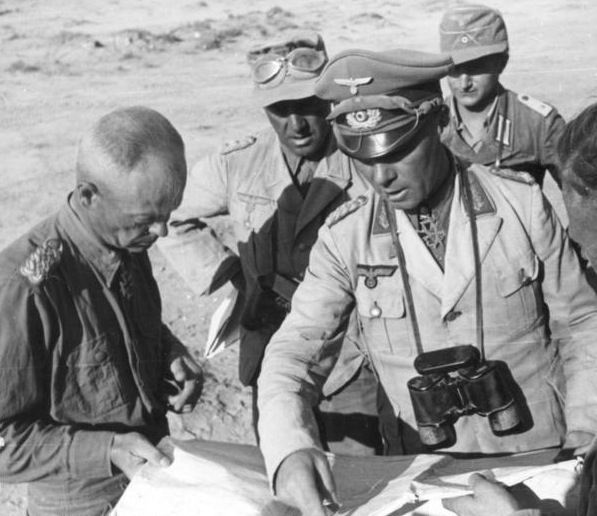
Bismarck and Rommel discuss dispositions of the 21st Panzer Division while Fritz Bayerlein looks on

== Awards and decorations ==
- Iron Cross (1914)
  - 2nd Class
  - 1st Class
- Military Merit Order, 4th class with Swords (Bavaria)
- Knight's Cross of the Military Karl-Friedrich Merit Order (Baden)
- Military Merit Cross, 3rd class with War Decoration (Austria-Hungary)
- Hanseatic Cross of Hamburg
- Knight's Cross of the Royal House Order of Hohenzollern with Swords
- Honour Cross of the World War 1914/1918
- Iron Cross (1939)
  - 2nd Class (20 September 1939)
  - 1st Class (1 October 1939)
- Eastern Front Medal
- Panzer Badge
- Knight's Cross of the Iron Cross on 29 September 1940 as Oberst and commander of Schützen-Regiment 7
- Ärmelband Afrika

Military offices
Preceded by Generalleutnant Horst Stumpff	Acting commander of 20th Panzer Division; 10 September 1941 – 13 October 1941	Succeeded by Generalmajor Wilhelm Ritter von Thoma
Preceded by Generalmajor Karl Böttcher	Commander of 21st Panzer Division; 11 February 1942 – 21 July 1942	Succeeded by Oberst Alfred Bruer
