= Gustav-Georg Knabe =

- Born: 8 July 1897
- Died: 13 December 1972 (aged 75)
- Military career
- Allegiance: Nazi Germany
- Branch: Army (Wehrmacht)
- Rank: Generalmajor
- Commands: 21st Panzer Division
- Conflicts: World War II
- Awards: Knight's Cross of the Iron Cross

Gustav-Georg Knabe (8 July 1897 – 13 December 1972) was a general in the Wehrmacht of Nazi Germany during World War II. He was a recipient of the Knight's Cross of the Iron Cross.

== Awards ==
- Knight's Cross of the Iron Cross on 1 June 1941 as Oberstleutnant and commander of Kradschützen-Bataillon 15

Military offices
Preceded by Generalmajor Johann von Ravenstein	Acting commander of 21st Panzer Division; 29 November 1941 – 1 December 1941	Succeeded by Generalmajor Karl Böttcher
