= Madonne-et-Lamerey =

- Commune
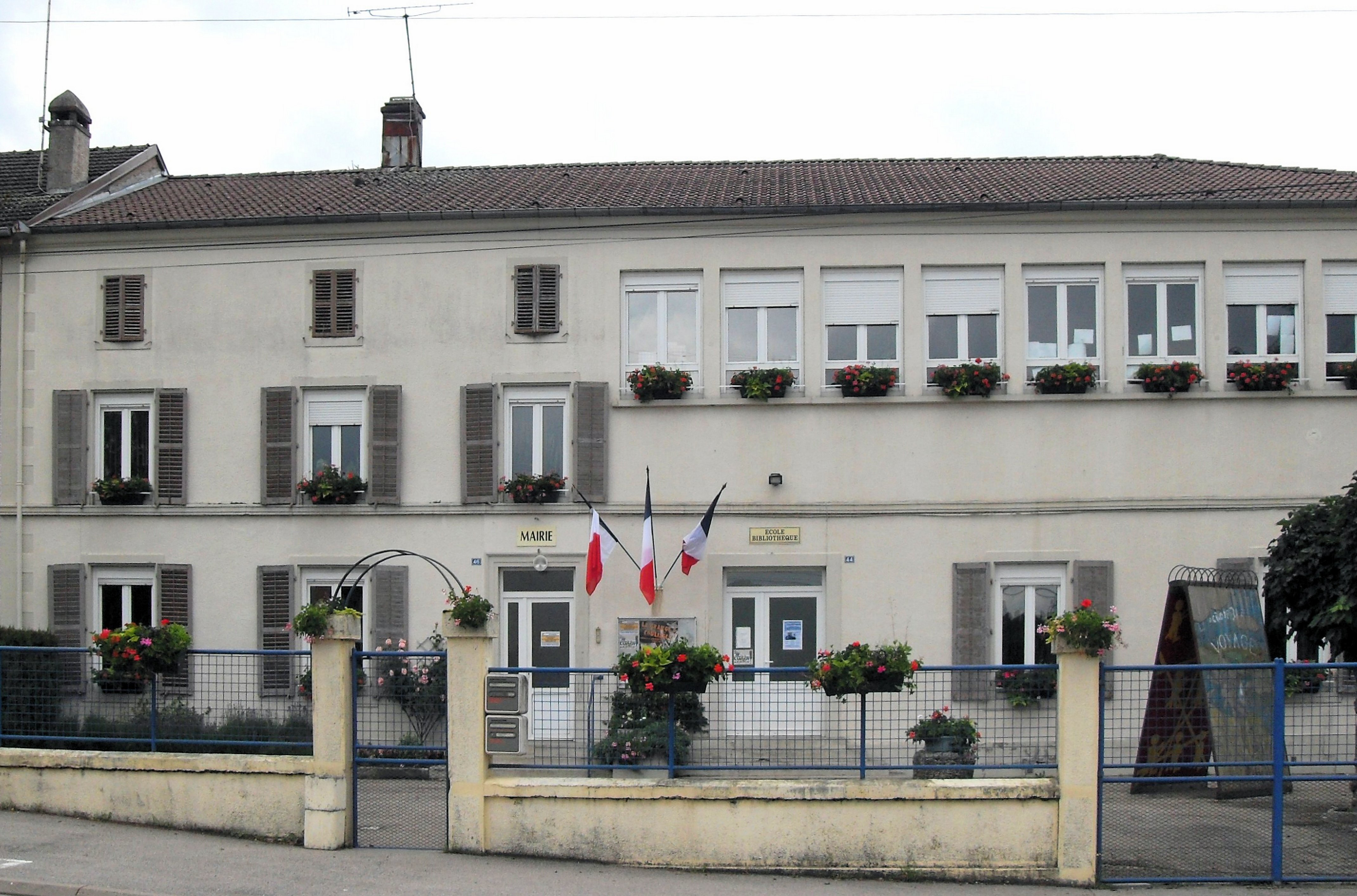
- The town hall in Madonne-et-Lamerey
- Location of Madonne-et-Lamerey
- Location within France Location within Grand Est
- Coordinates: 48°13′22″N 6°14′15″E
- Country: France
- Region: Grand Est
- Department: Vosges
- Arrondissement: Neufchâteau
- Canton: Darney
- Intercommunality: CC Mirecourt Dompaire

Government
  - Mayor (2020–2026): Alain Mourot
- Area^{1}: 7.02 km^{2} (2.71 sq mi)
- Elevation: 305 m (1,001 ft)
- Highest elevation: 433 m (1,421 ft)
- Lowest elevation: 294 m (965 ft)
- Population (2023): 407
  - Density: 58.0/km^{2} (150/sq mi)
- Time zone: UTC+01:00 (CET)
  - Summer (DST): UTC+02:00 (CEST)
- INSEE/Postal code: 88281 /88270
- ^{1} French Land Register data, which excludes lakes, ponds, glaciers > 1 km^{2} (0.386 sq mi or 247 acres) and river estuaries.

Madonne-et-Lamerey (French pronunciation: [madɔn e lamʁɛ]) is a commune in the Vosges department in Grand Est in northeastern France.

Inhabitants are called Lamadoniens.

== Geography ==
Madonne-et-Lamerey comprises a grouping of hamlets on the eastern edge of Dompaire. It is crossed by the little River Gitte, a tributary of the Madon.

== History ==
The commune of Madonne-et-Lamerey as currently constituted was created shortly after the Revolution.

In earlier times Madonne was the local capital of a small territory that included Madonne, Lamerey, Naglaincourt, Craincourt and Chenimont, and which was part of the bailiwick of Dompaire. The bailiwick belonged to the Abbess of Remiremont who had control over the administration of justice here at all levels, although the administration of justice was in practice delegated. In terms of ecclesiastical administration the commune fell within the parish of Laviéville, having no church of its own: it remains without its own church to this day, being currently within the parish of Dompaire.

== See also ==
- Communes of the Vosges department
