= Douzy =

- Commune
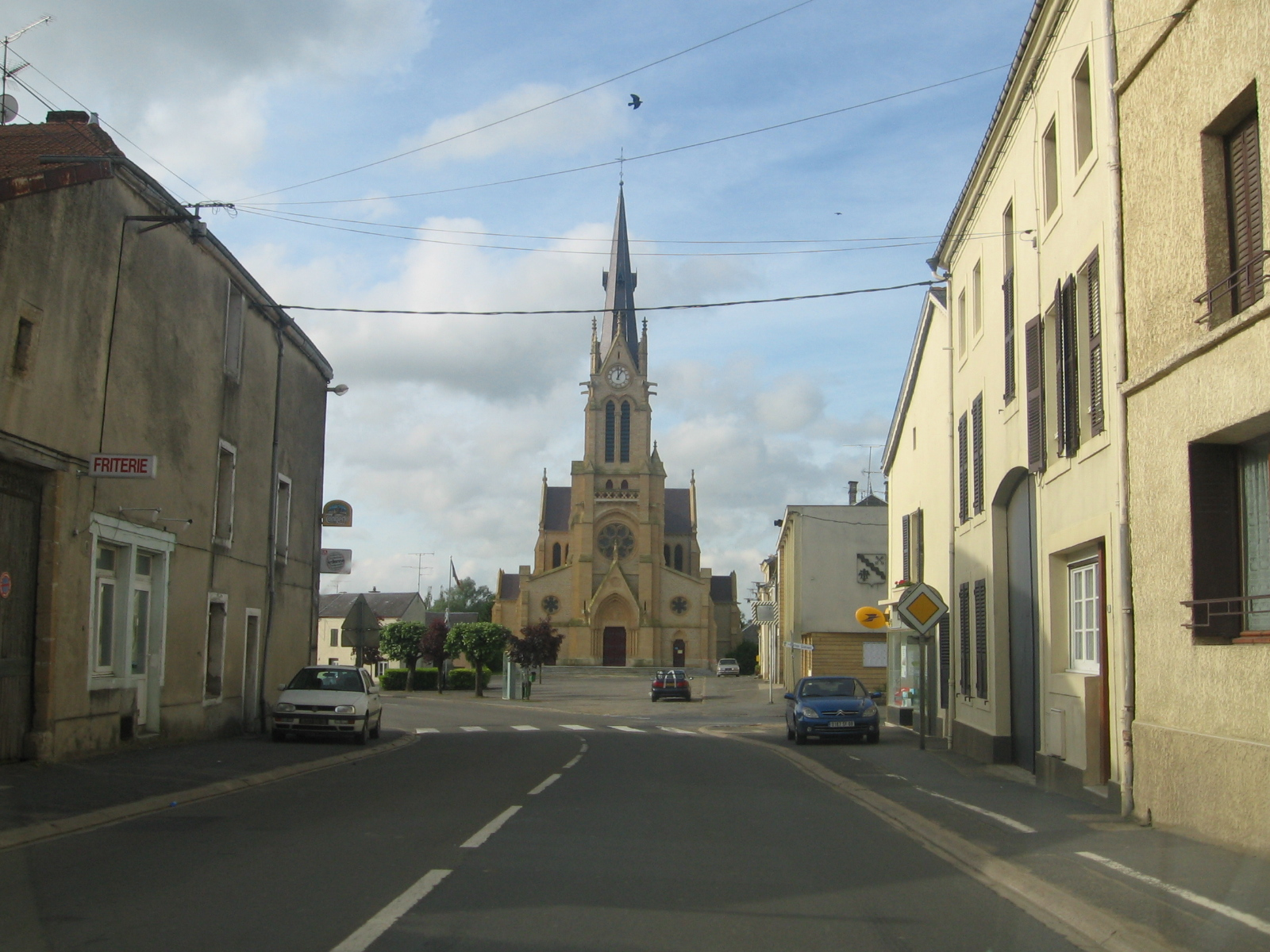
- The church and surroundings in Douzy

- Coat of arms
- Location of Douzy
- Location within France Location within Grand Est
- Coordinates: 49°40′20″N 5°02′30″E
- Country: France
- Region: Grand Est
- Department: Ardennes
- Arrondissement: Sedan
- Canton: Carignan

Government
  - Mayor (2020–2026): Charline Closse
- Area^{1}: 12.76 km^{2} (4.93 sq mi)
- Elevation: 161 m (528 ft)
- Highest elevation: 250 m (820 ft)
- Lowest elevation: 153 m (502 ft)
- Population (2023): 2,134
  - Density: 167.2/km^{2} (433.2/sq mi)
- Time zone: UTC+01:00 (CET)
  - Summer (DST): UTC+02:00 (CEST)
- INSEE/Postal code: 08145 /08140
- ^{1} French Land Register data, which excludes lakes, ponds, glaciers > 1 km^{2} (0.386 sq mi or 247 acres) and river estuaries.

Douzy (French pronunciation: [duzi]) is a commune in the Ardennes department in northern France. In September 2015 it absorbed the former commune of Mairy.

== Population ==
Population data refer to the commune in its geography as of January 2025.

Historical population
Year	Pop.	±% p.a.
1968	1,474	—
1975	1,610	+1.27%
1982	1,718	+0.93%
1990	1,658	−0.44%
1999	1,654	−0.03%
2007	1,975	+2.24%
2012	2,123	+1.46%
2017	2,167	+0.41%
2023	2,134	−0.26%
Source: INSEE

== See also ==
- Communes of the Ardennes department
