= Alfred Bruer =

- Born: 4 November 1897
- Died: 12 February 1976 (aged 78)
- Military career
- Allegiance: German Empire; Weimar Republic; Nazi Germany
- Branch: Army
- Rank: Oberst
- Commands: 21st Panzer Division
- Conflicts: World War II
- Awards: Knight's Cross of the Iron Cross

Alfred Bruer (4 November 1897 – 12 February 1976) was an officer in the Wehrmacht of Nazi Germany during World War II who briefly commanded the 21st Panzer Division. He was a recipient of the Knight's Cross of the Iron Cross. Bruer surrendered to the Allied troops following the fall of Tunisia in 1943.

== Awards and decorations ==
- Knight's Cross of the Iron Cross on 30 July 1942 as Oberst and commander of Panzer-Artillerie-Regiment 155

Military offices
Preceded by Generalleutnant Georg von Bismarck	Commander of 21. Panzer-Division; 21 July 1942 - 1 August 1942	Succeeded by Generalleutnant Georg von Bismarck
