= Horst von Usedom =

WW2 German Army general (1906-1970)

- Born: 9 March 1906
- Died: 14 October 1970 (aged 64)
- Military career
- Allegiance: Nazi Germany
- Branch: Army (Wehrmacht)
- Rank: Generalmajor
- Commands: 12 Panzer Division
- Conflicts: World War II; Invasion of Poland; Battle of France; Balkan Campaign; Operation Barbarossa; Battle of Moscow; Case Blue; Battle of Dompaire; Courland Pocket
- Awards: Knight's Cross of the Iron Cross with Oak Leaves

Horst von Usedom (9 March 1906 – 14 October 1970) was a general in the Wehrmacht of Nazi Germany during World War II who commanded the 12th Panzer Division. He was a recipient of the Knight's Cross of the Iron Cross with Oak Leaves.

Usedom surrendered to the Soviet forces in the Courland Pocket in May 1945. He was held prisoner in the Soviet Union until 1955.

== Awards and decorations ==
- Iron Cross (1939) 2nd Class (22 September 1939) & 1st Class (30 May 1940)
- German Cross in Gold on 29 January 1945 as Oberst in Panzergrenadier-Regiment 108
- Knight's Cross of the Iron Cross with Oak Leaves
  - Knight's Cross on 31 December 1941 as Major and commander of Kradschützen Battalion 61
  - 809th Oak Leaves on 28 March 1945 as Oberst and commander of Panzer Brigade "Kurland"

Military offices
Preceded by Generalleutnant Erpo Freiherr von Bodenhausen	Commander of 12. Panzer-Division; 12 April 1945 – May 1945	Succeeded by None
