= Edgar Feuchtinger =

Wehrmacht general (1894-1960)

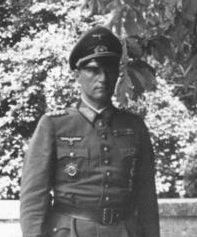
- Feuchtinger in 1944
- Born: 9 November 1894; Metz, Alsace-Lorraine
- Died: 21 January 1960 (aged 65); Berlin, Germany
- Military career
- Allegiance: German Empire; Weimar Republic; Nazi Germany
- Branch: German Army
- Service years: 1914–1945
- Rank: Generalleutnant
- Commands: 21st Panzer Division
- Conflicts: World War I; Battle of Verdun; Battle of the Somme; Second Battle of the Aisne; World War II; Operation Barbarossa; Case Anton; D-Day; Falaise pocket
- Awards: Knight's Cross of the Iron Cross; Deutsches Kreuz in Silver

Edgar Feuchtinger (9 November 1894 – 21 January 1960) was a German General (Generalleutnant) during the Second World War. Feuchtinger was commander of the 21st Panzer Division during the Normandy Invasion. Later in 1944 he was tried and convicted of treason by the Reich court, demoted and sentenced to execution. The sentence was commuted by the intervention of Adolf Hitler. Feuchtinger did not report to his next assignment, and avoided the German military police until he could surrender to the Allies.

Later in life, while a private citizen, Feuchtinger was pressured by the KGB into finding and disclosing secret information on the West German military and transferring this information to the Soviet Union.

In 2008 his conviction by the Reich court in 1944 came up during a German national discussion on the review of war veterans convicted by the Nazi government of treason. His earlier conviction was not overturned.

== World War I ==
Feuchtinger joined a cadet school in Karlsruhe in 1907. During the First World War, he fought as lieutenant in Russia and France. While there, he participated in the Battle of Verdun, the Battle of the Somme and the Second Battle of the Aisne.

== World War II ==
After Germany's capitulation, Feuchtinger was selected to continue on as an officer in the much reduced Reichswehr where he served in a variety of staff roles. He transitioned to field command in 1937, and in August 1939, he was appointed to command an artillery regiment of the 227th Infantry Division. Feuchtinger commanded this unit in the western campaign, fighting in Belgium and France. In 1941, the unit was transferred to the Eastern Front, where his division participated in Operation Barbarossa as part of Army Group North.

=== France 1943 ===
On November 27, 1942 he commanded Kampfgruppe A during the German occupation of previously free Vichy France. His forces occupied the city of Toulon and attempted to bring the ships of the French fleet stationed there under their control.

In April 1943 Feuchtinger was appointed commander of a "Schnelle Division" (fast division). The fast divisions were a new concept and were intended to be a highly mobile division to allow the few forces in France to rapidly respond to an invasion threat that could suddenly materialise in any one of a number of coast regions in France. Four of these were to be formed and based in central France. Though a good businessman and organiser, Feuchtinger had no experience as a panzer commander, and his appointment is thought to have been due to his connections in the Nazi Party. The division formed was known as Schnell Division West (Fast Division West).

The fast divisions were to be highly motorised, and were intended to have greater transport capacity than was allotted to a panzer division. This concept could not be implemented due to shortfalls in equipment. Germany could not replace its losses in the east, let alone equip new formations in France. To provide his division with equipment Feuchtinger prevailed upon Major Alfred Becker, a friend of his who was a mechanical engineer. Feuchtinger had championed Major Becker's efforts to make use of captured French equipment and convert them to mobilise German guns. Becker had been converting captured and damaged French equipment from 1940 into functioning vehicles that would be effective in the combat of 1943. Becker was given a command in the division, and soon set about equipping the division with modified French light tractors, halftracks and trucks. These he provided with light armour shielding to protect the crews from small arms fire, and many were modified to carry a heavy gun or other weapons. The troops that filled the ranks of the division initially were a mix of soldiers from Germany and volunteers from the occupied territories.

Four months later the forming unit was enlarged and organised into a standard panzer division, and was given the designation of the 21st Panzer Division. The original 21st Panzer Division had been part of the Afrika Korps and was reduced in the battles of North Africa. The bulk of the remainder fell into captivity at Tunisia. The German command tended to "reform" lost units, and chose this unit designation for one of the new divisions that were being formed in France. Some 2,000 veterans from the Afrika Korps who had been sent home early to recover from wounds or disease were added to the unit to give it experience. Feuchtinger was able to garner a number of able unit commanders. Though Afrika veteran Fritz Bayerlein in command of the Panzer Lehr Division requested and was given Colonel Hans von Luck, when he arrived von Luck was transferred to 21st Panzer to serve as the panzergrenadier regiment commander for Feuchtinger.

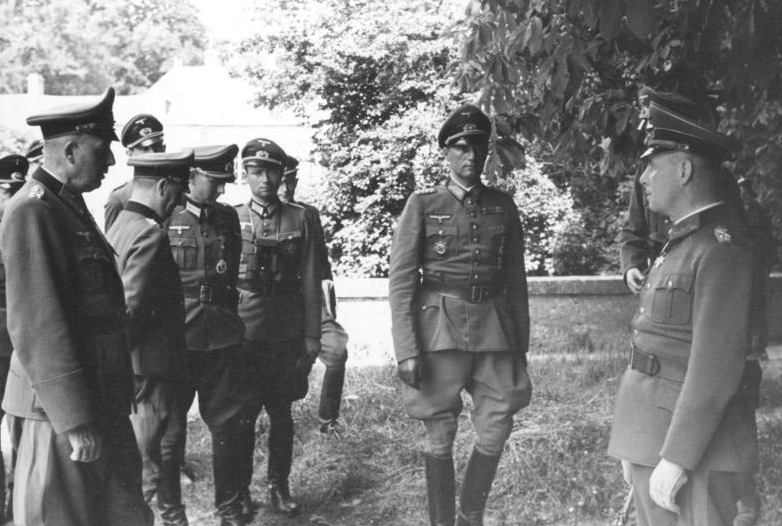
Erwin Rommel discusses review of Feuchtinger's 21st Panzer Division.

By May 1944 the reformed 21st Panzer was nearly fully equipped and stationed near Caen. Feuchtinger spent much of his time in Paris, ostensibly overseeing production of materials for his division, as Becker was using the Hotchkiss plant near Paris for his conversion facility. A second reason for his presence was that Paris offered many diversions, and was the residence of Feuchtinger's actress girlfriend.

=== Invasion of Normandy ===
Feuchtinger was in Paris at the time of the Normandy invasion. He returned to Normandy with his female companion on June 6, but commanded the division from the rear. He allowed his subordinate commanders a great deal of latitude in making decisions for their units. On August 1, 1944 Feuchtinger was promoted to lieutenant general. Shortly thereafter, on August 6, 1944, he received the Knight's Cross of the Iron Cross.

Colonel von Luck, a commander of broad experience, ended up operating his armoured regiment through the entire campaign, from the Normandy landings through the breakout attempt of Operation Goodwood to the final devastation of the 7th Army in the Falaise pocket, with very little contact or direction from Feuchtinger. Much of the 21st Panzer Division was caught in the Falaise Gap, but Feuchtinger managed to keep clear of the encirclement, telling von Luck: "From now on you are on your own. I cannot tell you where you will get fuel, ammunition or food. All the best, Luck. Bring me back lots of men from our division."

=== Siegfried line ===
Reformed and reinforced in Germany, the core of his division was involved in heavy fighting in Northern Alsace while Feuchtinger lived in Celle in northern Germany. His presence there brought the attention of the local citizens, who were aware that he was securing extra food supplies for his girlfriend and using his position to keep three officer friends of his out of combat. According to his former commander Hermann Balck he was also under suspicion of organising a large scale insurance fraud on French territory, which culminated in the purchase of a whole private castle during the occupation. On January 5, 1945 Feuchtinger was arrested and charged with enrichment from Jewish wealth through illegal sale of furs, the withdrawal of officers from military service, misappropriation of Wehrmacht property and the release of military secrets to his South American mistress. He was imprisoned in Torgau in January 1945, and found guilty by a German military court. In consequence all orders and decorations were taken from him, his military rank was reduced to Kanonier (rank equivalent to private in the artillery), and he was condemned to death. On 2 March 1945 Hitler ordered that Feuchtinger should be pardoned and reinstated to the front. He was assigned to the 20th Panzer-Grenadier-Division as Kanonier. Feuchtinger deserted from this assignment. A search was begun for him on 12 April 1945 but was unsuccessful. Instead of going to the front, Feuchtinger appeared at his farmhouse near Celle. On 29 May 1945, he obtained a general's uniform and surrendered into British captivity. He went through several prison camps, including the British camp for German generals at Trent Park. His presence in the U.S. internment camp at Allendorf met with strong protests from the German officers being held there.

== Post war activities ==
To his captors Feuchtinger was able to pass himself off as a victim of Nazi justice, and subsequently received an early release from the general board in 1946. After his return to Germany he worked as a representative for several companies before signing on at the Bremer Vulkan yard. There he worked trading in steel products for use in heavy industry.

=== Involvement in espionage ===
In May 1953 Feuchtinger was approached by a stranger at the Central Rail Station in Krefeld. The stranger was a KGB agent who showed Feuchtinger a military police document dated 12 April 1945. It is unclear exactly what the document was, but the threat of revealing it was able to elicit assistance from Feuchtinger. Feuchtinger was required to use his position to obtain and pass on information about German re-armament. For the next 7 years Feuchtinger provided Soviet military intelligence with classified information regarding the West German military, until his death from a stroke suffered in Berlin in 1960.

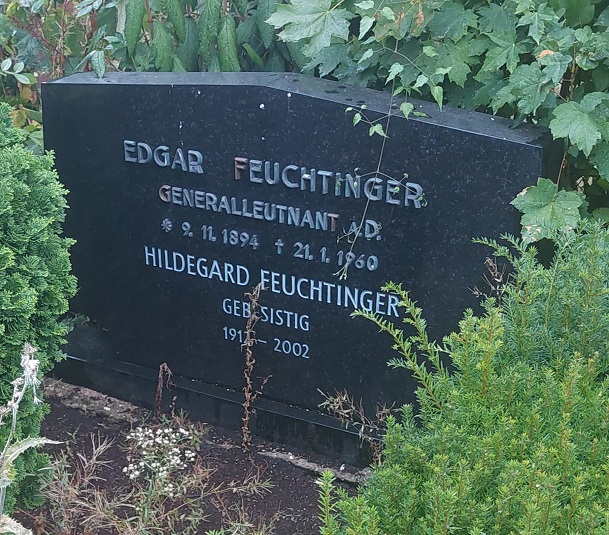
Grave Edgar Feuchtinger Krefeld

== Decorations ==
- Iron Cross (1914) 2nd Class (28 May 1915) & 1st Class (20 January 1918)
- Medal for Bravery (Austria-Hungary) in Bronze (26 November 1915)
- Knight's Cross 2nd Class of the Order of the Zähringer Lion with Swords (30 September 1916)
- Knight's Cross 2nd Class with Swords of the Württemberg Friedrich Order (16 December 1917)
- Hanseatic Cross of Hamburg (11 November 1918)
- Honour Cross of the World War 1914/1918 (22 February 1935)
- German Olympic Decoration 1st Class (16 August 1936)
- Clasp to the Iron Cross (1939) 2nd Class (17 May 1940) & 1st Class (14 July 1940)
- Eastern Front Medal (26 July 1942)
- War Merit Cross 1st and 2nd Class with Swords (1 September 1942)
- German Cross in Silver (15 July 1943)
- Knight's Cross of the Iron Cross on 6 August 1944 as Generalmajor and commander of the 21. Panzer-Division (Note: Feuchtinger was arrested on 5 January 1945 for his absence from his command in June and December 1944. He was demoted to Kanonier and sentenced to death in January 1945. Feuchtinger was sent to the front with the 20. Panzergrenadier-Division for probation on 2 March 1945. He deserted, hid in Celle, and was captured and taken prisoner of war in Hamburg by British forces in May 1945. The death sentence resulted in the permanent loss of all orders and honorary signs.)
- Wehrmacht Long Service Award, 4th with 1st class
