= Mairy =

- Part of Douzy
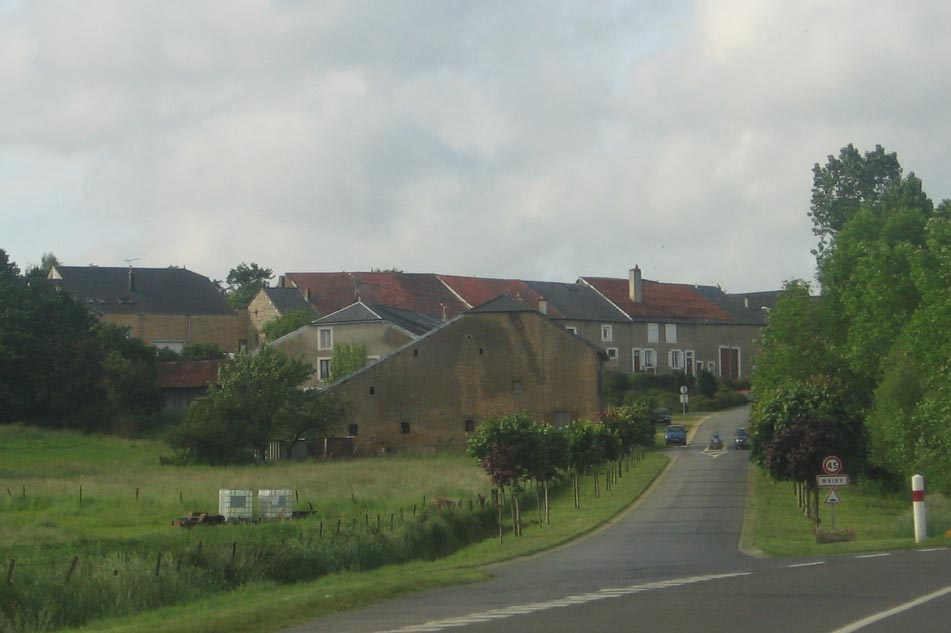

- Coat of arms
- Location of Mairy
- Location within France Location within Grand Est
- Coordinates: 49°39′00″N 5°02′56″E
- Country: France
- Region: Grand Est
- Department: Ardennes
- Arrondissement: Sedan
- Canton: Carignan
- Commune: Douzy
- Area^{1}: 7.44 km^{2} (2.87 sq mi)
- Elevation: 185 m (607 ft)
- Highest elevation: 291 m (955 ft)
- Lowest elevation: 153 m (502 ft)
- Population (2023): 245
  - Density: 32.9/km^{2} (85.3/sq mi)
- Time zone: UTC+01:00 (CET)
  - Summer (DST): UTC+02:00 (CEST)
- Postal code: 08140
- ^{1} French Land Register data, which excludes lakes, ponds, glaciers > 1 km^{2} (0.386 sq mi or 247 acres) and river estuaries.

Mairy (French pronunciation: [mɛʁi]) is a former commune in the Ardennes department in northern France.

On 15 September 2015, Mairy was annexed by the commune of Douzy.

== See also ==
- Communes of the Ardennes department
