= Dompaire =

- Commune
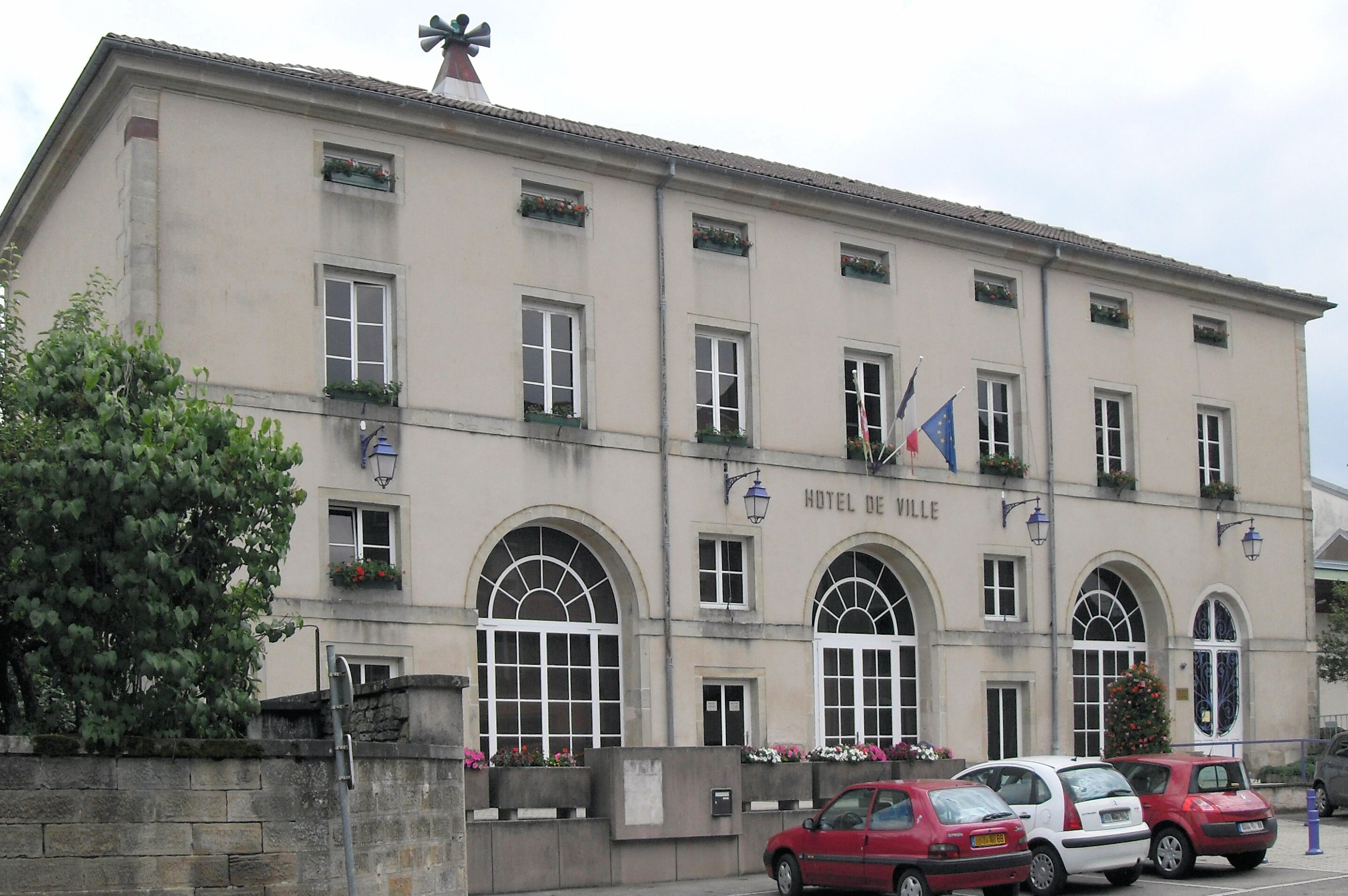
- The town hall in Dompaire

- Coat of arms
- Location of Dompaire
- Location within France Location within Grand Est
- Coordinates: 48°13′21″N 6°13′23″E
- Country: France
- Region: Grand Est
- Department: Vosges
- Arrondissement: Neufchâteau
- Canton: Darney
- Intercommunality: CC Mirecourt Dompaire

Government
  - Mayor (2020–2026): Philippe Ferratier
- Area^{1}: 16.63 km^{2} (6.42 sq mi)
- Elevation: 304 m (997 ft)
- Highest elevation: 387 m (1,270 ft)
- Lowest elevation: 278 m (912 ft)
- Population (2023): 1,077
  - Density: 64.76/km^{2} (167.7/sq mi)
- Time zone: UTC+01:00 (CET)
  - Summer (DST): UTC+02:00 (CEST)
- INSEE/Postal code: 88151 /88270
- ^{1} French Land Register data, which excludes lakes, ponds, glaciers > 1 km^{2} (0.386 sq mi or 247 acres) and river estuaries.

Dompaire (French pronunciation: [dɔ̃pɛʁ]) is a commune in the Vosges department in Grand Est in northeastern France. In September 1944 during World War II a detachment of General Philippe Leclerc's French 2nd Armoured Division engaged and defeated a German Panzer brigade causing significant losses.

== See also ==
- Communes of the Vosges department
