= 21st Panzer Division =

German army division during World War II

German 21st Panzer Division
- Unit insignia
- Active: 1 August 1941 – 8 May 1945
- Country: Germany
- Branch: Army
- Type: Panzer
- Role: Armoured warfare
- Size: Division
- Engagements: North African campaign; Battle of El Alamein; Tunisian campaign; Normandy landings; Operation Bluecoat; Battle of the Bulge; Vistula–Oder offensive; Battle of Berlin

The 21st Panzer Division was a German armoured division best known for its role in the battles of the North African Campaign from 1941 to 1943 during World War II when it was one of the two armoured divisions making up the Deutsches Afrikakorps (DAK). It was first formed as the 5th Light Division in early 1941.

== 1941–1942 ==
The Italian army group in North Africa was routed by the British Commonwealth Western Desert Force in Operation Compass 9 December 1940 – 9 February 1941 under General Wavell. The German Armed Forces High Command (Oberkommando der Wehrmacht) decided to send a "blocking force" to Libya to support the Italian army, commanded by the future Field Marshal Erwin Rommel. The German blocking force at first was based only on Panzer Regiment 5, which was put together from the second regiment of the 3rd Panzer Division. These elements were organized into the 5th Light Division when they arrived in Africa from 10 February – 12 March 1941. On 2 March 1941, the first 8.8 cm "88" dual purpose anti-aircraft/anti-tank guns arrived and provided much needed firepower. Although the DAK commander, Erwin Rommel, was under strict orders to remain on the defensive, he ordered an attack on 31 March 1941 by the 5th Light and four Italian divisions, which was a big success, as the British began a retreat that would, by April, see German forces pushing into Egypt after an advance of some 600 miles (970 km).

In late April and into May, the 5th Light Division was joined by elements of 15th Panzer Division forming the Afrika Corps. In late summer the 90th Light Infantry Division was formed and joined the Africa Corps. On 15 August 1941, the 5th Light Division was redesignated 21st Panzer Division.

After being renamed the 21st Panzer Division, the unit did not enjoy any particular success throughout the remainder of the year. The British regrouped and were reinforced, and formed the British Eighth Army made up of XIII Corps and XXX Corps. Eighth Army launched Operation Crusader on 18 November 1941, which forced Rommel to retreat to El Agheila by the end of the year, allowing the British to re-occupy Cyrenaica and lift the Siege of Tobruk. The 21st Panzer, along with 15th Panzer Division, did score a notable victory over XXX Corps (and in particular the 7th Armoured Division) on 22 November at Sidi Rezegh and broke through to the Egyptian border, posing a threat to the Eighth Army. Over-stretched supply lines and the urgent need to assist the Axis forces around Tobruk, which were being hard-pressed by XIII Corps, obliged them to withdraw. On returning to Sidi Rezegh, the division lost Major-General Johann von Ravenstein, who was captured while on reconnaissance during 29 November.

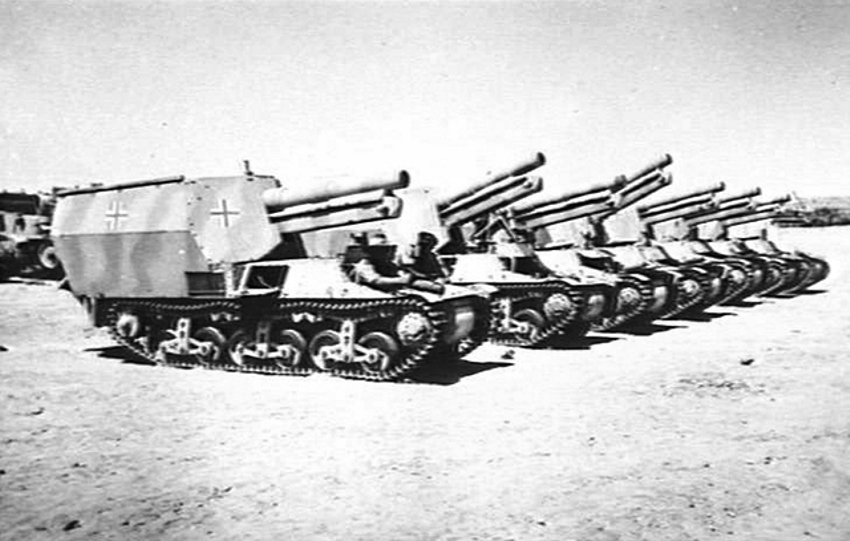
Seven captured German self-propelled 15 cm howitzers from the division, near El Alamein, Egypt

Although joined by the Special Use Division Africa (90th Light Infantry Division after 27 November 1941), a formation which was also made up from an assortment of smaller elements in August 1941, the German forces in this theatre were still vulnerable. In the early months of 1942 the supply situation improved, with the British island fortress of Malta coming under intense air attack, allowing Axis supply convoys from Italy to get through. The British Operation Acrobat was planned to drive the DAK back to Tripoli, but a quick counter-offensive by Rommel surprised the British and pushed them back out of Cyrenaica. Reaching Derna by 3 February 1942, the 21st Panzer was the linchpin of the assault. Just days earlier, on 30 January 1942, Major General Georg von Bismarck was appointed as the new divisional commander.

Gazala was taken on 5 June 1942, and during the battle from 20 to 21 June, 21st Panzer along with 90th Light Division and 15th Panzer Division broke through the Tobruk perimeter, capturing nearly 35,000 prisoners. As a result, the British Eighth Army fell back. The fighting had taken its toll on the division, with the 15th and 21st Panzer only able to field 44 tanks between them. Four-fifths of their transport vehicles had been captured when they crossed into Egypt.

The British prepared a new defensive position at Mersa Matruh. 21st Panzer was used to sweep behind the British XIII Corps, where it engaged in an intense combat with the 2nd New Zealand Division at the Battle of Mersa Matruh. The British were defeated and fell back to a new line at El Alamein. In a series of battles fought in July 1942, the Eighth Army was able to stop the advance of the Afrika Korps at the First Battle of El Alamein. Shortages in equipment, ammunition and fuel limited further actions. Rommel made a last effort to break through the British positions on 31 August 1942 at the Battle of Alam el Halfa, but the Germans were again repulsed. In a series of battles in this area the 21st Panzer Division commander von Bismarck was killed by a British mine and Oberst C. H. Lungerhausen took command until Major General Heinz von Randow arrived on 18 September.

On 23 October 1942, the British offensive and the Second Battle of El Alamein began. The Germans were overwhelmed and 21st Panzer was reduced to only four tanks by 7 November. During the long retreat to Tunisia, the 21st Panzer fought the rear guard actions. To compound German problems, the Anglo-Americans landed in Morocco and Algeria during Operation Torch and Panzerarmee Afrika, as it was now called, was threatened with annihilation, as it would be caught in a vice. On 21 December, von Randow was killed.

== 1943 ==
By the time it reached Tunis, 21st Panzer had ceased to exist as a cohesive unit and was split up into Battle Groups (Kampfgruppen) Pfeiffer and Gruen. They were subsequently renamed Battle Groups Stenkhoff and Schuette, which took part in the Battle of Kasserine Pass. Major General Von Hulsen surrendered the remnants of the division on 13 May 1943.

After Africa, the division was reformed in Europe, where it garrisoned Caen, until 16th field luftwaffe division relieved it of its duty. It was then moved to Paris, where it remained for rehabilitation and garrison duty until the Allied landings at Normandy. The new division's commander was Oberst Edgar Feuchtinger who was promoted to Generalmajor on 1 August 1943 and Generalleutenant (equivalent to Major-General) exactly a year later. It was heavily engaged in the fighting at the Normandy beachheads, being the only Panzer division to engage the Allies on the first day.

The division was formed from the elements of the newly created Schnelle Division West (Fast Division West), a newly designed, highly mobile type of formation that was intended to be able to cover a great deal of territory to reach a point of invasion. It was thought that a number of these formations would be set up in France, each with greater mobility and transport than a standard panzer division. German industry was unable to provide the vehicles for these units, and only a single brigade was formed, known as Schnelle Brigade West. This was largely fitted out with captured French half tracks and light tanks that had been armoured and up-gunned by a mechanical engineer by the name of Alfred Becker. Working at a conversion facility near Paris called Baukommando Becker, Becker provided the unit with most of its transport and all of its assault guns. On June 17, 1943 Schnelle Brigade West was upgraded to Schnelle Division West, and on June 27, 1943, was assigned the name 21st Panzer Division in memory of the unit that had fought and been captured in North Africa. Major Becker was assigned the command of the division's assault gun battalion, Panzerjäger-Abteilung 200. The division was under the command of Rommel, who was responsible for German forces from the Netherlands to the Loire.

== 1944–1945 ==
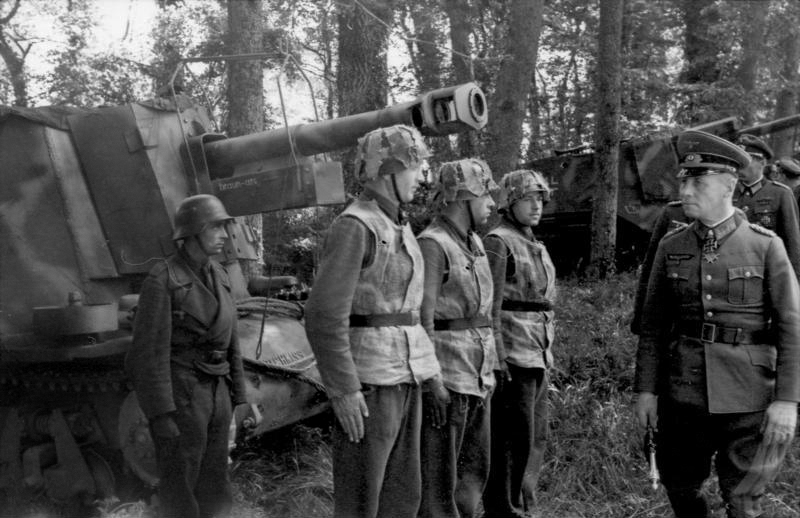
Rommel inspecting division in May, 1944.

Rommel had been away from the front during the first days of the invasion on leave to visit his family; he re-assumed command on 9 June. The division was grouped with two panzer divisions, 12SS and Panzer Lehr, under the command of Sepp Dietrich which were to push northwest to retake Bayeux but this plan was abandoned when the divisional staff were killed in an air raid.

The division continued to fight as part of the front throughout June and July. Between 6 June and 8 July, 21st Panzer reported the loss of 54 Panzer IVs, with 17 Panzer IVs arriving as replacements. On 3 July a German report stated the following number of enemy tanks destroyed by 21st Panzer according to weapon used: Pz: 37, Sturmgeschütz: 15, Mot. Pak & Flak: 41, Artillery: 3, Infantry: 5. Total 101. To 27 July German tank losses continued in similar numbers.

Between 6 June and 7 August, British reports based on captured vehicles suggested that about half of the German tanks knocked out were because of armour-piercing ammunition; the rest by a roughly equal combination of infantry anti-tank weapons, artillery, aircraft rockets or cannon, or were abandoned/destroyed by their crews. The last major action the 21st Panzer took part in on the Western Front was the stubborn resistance it gave the British Guards Armoured Division during Operation Bluecoat, on 1 August 1944.

The surviving forces of the 21st Panzer were then almost entirely lost in the Falaise Pocket. The remnants of the unit merged with the 16th Luftwaffe Field Division. Of the 223 tanks of the 21st and other Divisions captured in the area by British forces between 8–31 August, about three quarters were abandoned/destroyed by their crews.

In December, Rundstedt decided not to commit the 21st to offensive actions in Operation Wacht am Rhein, leaving it to provide flank cover, which probably saved it from total destruction. On 29 December, 21st Panzer reported the following strength: 72 Panzer IV tanks, 38 Panther tanks and 8 Flakpanzer IV.

From January 7 to 21 Col Hans von Luck's 125 Regiment of the 21st took part in Operation Nordwind, aiming to sever the American supply line to Strasbourg. Two weeks of heavy fighting in the villages of Rittershoffen and Hatten followed. Luck recalled to Stephen Ambrose fifty years later that the battle was "one of the hardest and most costly battles that ever raged".

On 25 January 1945 the division was reformed as a much reduced Panzer Division and operated on the Eastern Front. The unit surrendered to the Soviet Red Army on 29 April 1945.

== Subordinate units in 1944–5 ==

Commander: Lieutenant General Edgar Feuchtinger

- 22 Panzer Regiment (Colonel Hermann von Oppeln-Bronikowski)
  - I Panzer Battalion
  - II Panzer Battalion
- 125 Panzer Grenadier Regiment (Major Hans von Luck)
  - I Panzer Grenadier Battalion
  - II Panzer Grenadier Battalion
- 192 Panzer Grenadier Regiment (Lieutenant Colonel Josef Rauch)
  - I Panzer Grenadier Battalion
  - II Panzer Grenadier Battalion
- 155 Panzer Artillery Regiment (Colonel Huehne)
  - I Panzer Artillery Battalion
  - II Panzer Artillery Battalion
  - III Panzer Artillery Battalion
- 21 Panzer Reconnaissance Battalion (Major Waldow)
- 200 Assault Gun Battalion (Major Alfred Becker)
- 200 Anti-tank Battalion
- 200 Panzer Signals Battalion
- 220 Panzer Engineer Battalion (Major Hoegl)
- 305 Flak Battalion (Major Ohlend)

== Commanding officers ==
As 5th Light Afrika Division:

- Generalmajor Johannes Streich, 18 February – 16 May 1941
- Generalmajor Heinrich Kirchheim, 16–31 May 1941

As 21st Panzer Division:

- Generalmajor Johann von Ravenstein, 1 August – 29 November 1941
- Oberstleutnant Gustav-Georg Knabe, 29 November – 1 December 1941 (acting leader)
- Generalmajor Karl Böttcher, 1 December 1941 – 11 February 1942
- Generalmajor Georg von Bismarck, 11 February – 21 July 1942
- Oberst Alfred Bruer, 21 July – 1 August 1942 (acting leader)
- Generalmajor Georg von Bismarck, 1–31 August 1942
- Oberst Karl-Hans Lungershausen, 1–18 September 1942 (acting leader)
- Generalmajor Heinz von Randow, 18 September – 21 December 1942
- Oberst Kurt Freiherr von Liebenstein, 21 December 1942 – 1 January 1943 (acting leader)
- Generalmajor Hans-Georg Hildebrandt, 1 January – 25 April 1943
- Oberst Heinrich-Hermann von Hülsen, 25 April – 13 May 1943
- Generalleutnant Edgar Feuchtinger, 15 May 1943 (re-creation) – 15 January 1944
- Generalmajor Oswin Grolig, 15 January – 8 March 1944
- Generalleutnant Franz Westhoven, 8 March – 8 May 1944
- Generalleutnant Edgar Feuchtinger, 8 May 1944 – 25 January 1945
- Oberst Helmut Zollenkopf, 25 January – 12 February 1945
- Generalleutnant Werner Marcks, 12 February – 8 May 1945

== See also ==
- Afrika Korps, Western Desert Campaign, North Africa Campaign

== Bibliography ==
- Ambrose, Stephen E. (1997). Citizen Soldiers: The U.S. Army from the Normandy Beaches to the Bulge to the Surrender of Germany, June 7, 1944-May 7, 1945. Simon & Schuster. ISBN 978-0-684-81525-1.
- Bernage, Georges (2002). Red Devils In Normandy. Heimdal. p. 9. ISBN 978-2-84048-159-1.
- Ellis, Chris (2001). 21st Panzer Division: Rommel's Afrika Korps Spearhead. Hersham: Allan Publishing. ISBN 978-0-7110-2853-1.
- Jentz, Thomas (1996). Panzertruppen: The Complete Guide to the Creation & Combat Employment of Germanys Tank Force 1943–1945. Schiffer Publishing. ISBN 978-0-7643-0080-6.
- Lewin, Ronald (1968). Rommel As Military Commander. New York: B & N Books. ISBN 978-0-7607-0861-3.
- von Mellenthin, Major General F. W. (1971) [1956]. Panzer Battles: A Study of the Employment of Armor in the Second World War (First Ballantine Books ed.). New York: Ballantine Books. ISBN 978-0-345-24440-6.
- Taylor, A. J. P. (1974). History of World War Two. London: Octopus. ISBN 978-0-7064-0399-2.
- Cole, Hugh M. (1965). "The Ardennes:Battle of the Bulge". Office of the Chief of Military History Department of the Army. Archived from the original on 8 December 2008.
