= Karl Böttcher =

German general (1889–1973)

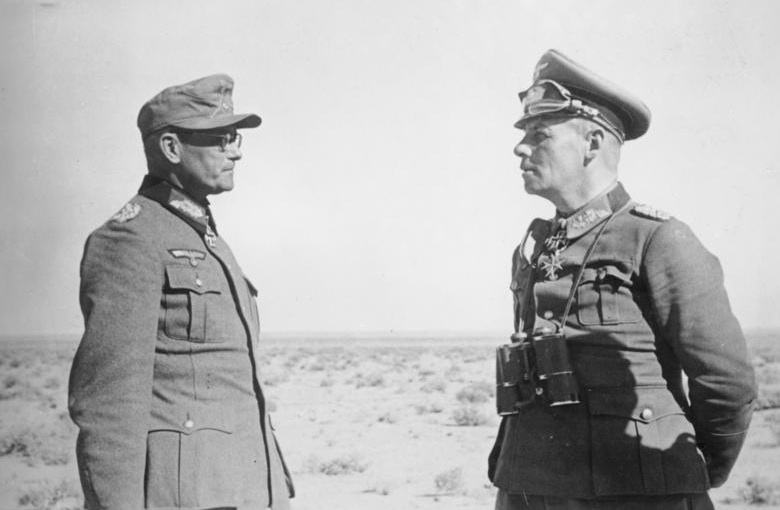
- Böttcher and Erwin Rommel
- Born: 25 October 1889; Thorn, West Prussia, German Empire (now Toruń, Kuyavian-Pomerania, Poland)
- Died: 21 October 1973 (aged 83); Bad Wimpfen, Baden Württemberg, West Germany
- Military career
- Allegiance: German Empire; Weimar Republic; Nazi Germany
- Branch: Army
- Service years: 1909–1945
- Rank: Generalleutnant
- Commands: 21st Panzer Division; 345th Infantry Division; 326th Infantry Division; 347th Infantry Division
- Conflicts: World War II
- Awards: Knight's Cross of the Iron Cross

Karl Böttcher (25 October 1889 – 21 October 1973), born in Toruń, was a German general in the Wehrmacht during World War II who commanded several divisions. He was a recipient of the Knight's Cross of the Iron Cross.

Böttcher served in the Deutsches Afrikakorps under Erwin Rommel where he commanded an artillery regiment. Later Böttcher was made commander of the 21st Panzer Division. Böttcher surrendered to the Western Allies on May 8, 1945 and was interned until June 25, 1947.

== Awards and decorations ==
- Iron Cross (1914) 2nd Class (November 1914) & 1st Class (July 1916)
- Frederickscross (27 January 1916)
- Honour Cross of the World War 1914/1918 (1 January 1935)
- Wehrmacht Long Service Award 1st Class (2 October 1936)
- Memel Medal (10 December 1939)
- Clasp to the Iron Cross (1939) 2nd Class (5 June 1940) & 1st Class (15 November 1940)
- Knight's Cross of the Iron Cross on 13 December 1941 as generalmajor and commander of 21st Panzer Division
- Italian Military Order of Savoy (14 January 1942)

Military offices
Preceded by Oberstleutnant Gustav-Georg Knabe	Commander of 21st Panzer Division; 1 December 1941 – 11 February 1942	Succeeded by Generalmajor Georg von Bismarck
