= Orders, decorations, and medals of Nazi Germany =

Orders, decorations, and medals of Nazi Germany were military, political, and civilian decorations that were bestowed between 1923 and 1945, first by the Nazi Party and later the state of Nazi Germany.

The first awards began in the 1920s, before the Nazis had come to national power in Germany, with the political decorations worn on Party uniforms, along with any awards they may have earned during the First World War or before.

After 1933, the state began issuing a variety of civilian decorations, which could be bestowed upon any citizen of Germany. Thus, some awards (such as Sports Badges) were bestowed on Nazi Party members, members of the German military, and regular civilians. Many standard awards of the German state, such as life-saving medals, were redesigned to incorporate the Nazi symbol, the swastika.

A number of military awards were established pre-war, including Wehrmacht long service decorations, followed by awards for participation in the Spanish Civil War and for the annexation of Austria and the Sudetenland, with the greatest number established after the start of World War II in 1939. Regulations of award also permitted the simultaneous wear of military, civilian, and political decorations on any military or paramilitary uniform of Nazi Germany.

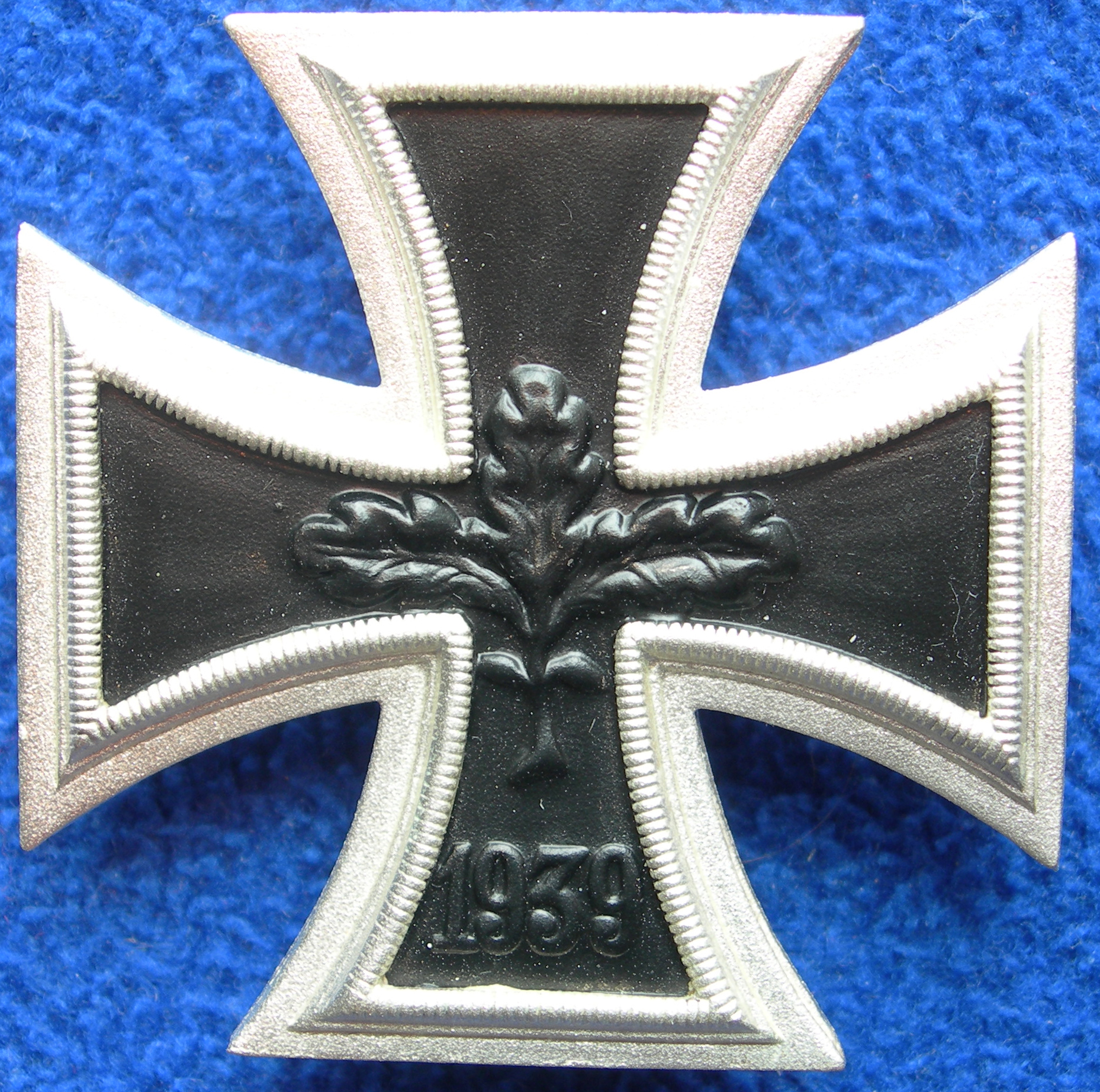
Post-1957 Iron Cross 1st class with the three-leafed oakleaf cluster

Nazi awards and decorations were discontinued after the defeat of Nazi Germany in 1945, with display of the swastika banned. In 1957 the Federal Republic of Germany permitted qualifying veterans to wear many Nazi-era awards on the Bundeswehr uniform, including most World War II valor and campaign awards, provided the swastika symbol was removed. This led to the re-design of many awards with, for example, the swastika being replaced by a three-leafed oakleaf cluster (see picture) on the Iron Cross and by the date 1939 on the War Merit Cross.

== Orders and decorations ==
=== State orders ===
Badge and ribbon	Name (English/German)	Creation date – cessation date	Description	Number awarded
	Order of the German Eagle; Verdienstorden vom Deutschen Adler	1 May 1937 – 8 May 1945	Awarded with and without swords	The number of times the order was awarded is unknown.
	Cross of Honour of the German Mother; Ehrenkreuz der Deutschen Mutter	1939 until 1945	Awarded to exemplary mothers who furnished Germany with Aryan children. Instigated by Adolf Hitler and bears his signature on the reverse. Awarded in three levels: bronze, silver, and gold	The number of times the order was awarded is unknown. It is estimated that up until September 1941 there were a total of 4.7 million recipient mothers.

=== War decorations: pre-1939 ===
Badge and ribbon	Name (English/German)	Creation date – cessation date	Description	Number awarded
	Spanish Cross; Spanien-Kreuz	14 April 1939 – 1940	Awarded with and without swords. Issued in bronze, silver, gold, and gold with diamonds. For service with the Condor Legion in Spain	26,116 total, for all classes
	Condor Legion Tank Badge; Panzertruppenabzeichen der Legion Condor	September 1936 – autumn 1939 (official decoration 10 July 1939)	For tank instructors and maintenance personnel who served with the Condor Legion in Spain, 1936–1939	415

=== War decorations: 1939–1945 ===
These awards were bestowed by the Wehrmacht and Waffen-SS between 1939 and 1945, during World War II.

Badge and ribbon	Name (English/German)	Creation date – cessation date	Description	Number awarded
	Star of the Grand Cross of the Iron Cross; Stern zum Großkreuz des Eisernen Kreuzes	1 September 1939 – 8 May 1945	A higher class of the Grand Cross of the Iron Cross. A prototype was made, but the decoration was never formally instituted or awarded.	0
	Grand Cross of the Iron Cross; Großkreuz des Eisernen Kreuzes	1 September 1939 – 8 May 1945	Awarded to victorious generals/field marshals of German forces and her allies. Hermann Göring, received the Grand Cross on 19 July 1940, the only recipient of World War II.	1
	Knight's Cross of the Iron Cross with Golden Oak Leaves, Swords and Diamonds; Ritterkreuz des Eisernen Kreuzes mit goldenem Eichenlaub, Schwertern und Brillanten	29 December 1944 – 8 May 1945	To be awarded after World War II to Germany's 12 greatest war heroes. Actually awarded only once, to Hans-Ulrich Rudel for continuous outstanding achievements and heroism	1
	Knight's Cross of the Iron Cross with Oak Leaves, Swords and Diamonds; Ritterkreuz des Eisernen Kreuzes mit Eichenlaub, Schwertern und Brillanten	28 September 1941 – 8 May 1945	For continuous bravery before the enemy or excellence in commanding troops after being awarded all preceding classes of the Knight's Cross/Iron Cross	27
	Knight's Cross of the Iron Cross with Oak Leaves and Swords; Ritterkreuz des Eisernen Kreuzes mit Eichenlaub und Schwertern	28 September 1941 – 8 May 1945	For continuous bravery before the enemy or excellence in commanding troops after being awarded all preceding classes of the Knight's Cross/Iron Cross	160 (159 German, 1 Japanese) (Note: One non-German received the Knight's Cross with oakleaves and swords: Admiral Yamamoto.)
	Knight's Cross of the Iron Cross with Oak Leaves; Ritterkreuz des Eisernen Kreuzes mit Eichenlaub	3 June 1940 – 8 May 1945	For continuous bravery before the enemy or excellence in commanding troops after being awarded all preceding classes of the Knight's Cross/Iron Cross	890 (882 German, 8 Axis allies)
	Knight's Cross of the Iron Cross; Ritterkreuz des Eisernen Kreuzes	1 September 1939 – 8 May 1945	Awarded for outstanding bravery in the face of the enemy and for brilliant service in command of troops. A requirement was the possession of the 1st and 2nd class of the Iron Cross.	7,318
	Golden Knights Cross of the War Merit Cross; Goldenes Ritterkreuz des Kriegsverdienstkreuz	13 October 1944 – 8 May 1945	Awarded with and without swords. For outstanding contributions to the war effort	2 (Further recommendations not approved by the end of the war)
	Knights Cross of the War Merit Cross; Ritterkreuz des Kriegsverdienstkreuz	19 August 1940 – 8 May 1945	Awarded with and without swords. For meritorious contributions to the war effort after being awarded all preceding classes of the War Merit Cross	c. 250
	German Cross in Gold with Diamonds; Kriegsorden des Deutschen Kreuzes in Gold mit Brillanten	October 1942 – 8 May 1945	To be awarded for continuous bravery before the enemy or excellence in commanding troops (having already been awarded the German Cross in Gold). No awards were ever made.	0
	German Cross in Gold; Kriegsorden des Deutschen Kreuzes in Gold	28 September 1941 – 8 May 1945	For continuous bravery before the enemy or excellence in commanding troops (not justifying the Knight's Cross of the Iron Cross but having already been awarded the Iron Cross 1st Class)	24,204 (24,190 German, 14 Axis allies)
	German Cross in Silver; Kriegsorden des Deutschen Kreuzes in Silber	28 September 1941 – 8 May 1945	For significant performances in aiding the military war effort (Not justifying the Knight's Cross of either the Iron Cross or the War Merit Cross but having already been awarded the Iron Cross 1st Class or War Merit Cross 1st Class)	1,115
	Honour Roll Clasp; Ehrenblattspange	30 January 1944 – 8 May 1945	Different designs for the army, navy and air force Awarded to those who appeared on the Honour Roll for distinction in combat	4,556 (Army and Waffen-SS awards only)
	Iron Cross (1st Class); Eisernes Kreuz 1. Klasse	1 September 1939 – 8 May 1945	For continuous bravery before the enemy or excellence in commanding troops after being awarded the Iron Cross 2nd class	c. 300,000
	Iron Cross (2nd Class); Eisernes Kreuz 2. Klasse	1 September 1939 – 8 May 1945	For bravery before the enemy or excellence in commanding troops	c. 4,500,000
	1939 Clasp to the Iron Cross; Spange zum Eisernen Kreuz	1 September 1939 – 8 May 1945	An award of the Iron Cross, 1st or 2nd class for those who had already received the decoration in World War I	100,000+
	War Merit Cross (1st Class); Kriegsverdienstkreuz 1. Klasse	18 October 1939 – 8 May 1945	Awarded with and without swords. For meritorious contributions to the war effort after being awarded the War Merit Cross, 2nd class	c. 480,000 with swords c. 90,000 without swords (Note: While estimates vary, War Merit Crosses/Medals awards total 'some 13 million', a figure reflected in total for all classes laid out here.)
	War Merit Cross (2nd Class); Kriegsverdienstkreuz 2. Klasse	18 October 1939 – 8 May 1945	Awarded with and without swords. For meritorious contributions to the war effort	c. 6,100,000 with swords c. 1,500,000 without swords
	War Merit Medal; Kriegsverdienstmedaille	19 August 1940 – 8 May 1945	For lower-level civilian contributions to the war effort	c. 4,900,000

=== Military service decorations ===
Cross of Honour (1914–1918) Ehrenkreuz des Weltkriegs	Eastern Medal Medaille Winterschlacht im Osten	West Wall Medal (Note: The West Wall Medal was issued twice, once in 1939 and again in 1944. The 1944 version was commonly referred to as the "German Defense Medal". A "1944 bar" was authorized for recipients of the 1939 West Wall Medal.) Schutzwall-Ehrenzeichen 1944 bar authorised	Anschluss Medal	Memel Medal	Sudetenland Medal Prague Castle Bar authorised

=== Military long service medals ===
Wehrmacht Long Service Award Wehrmacht-Dienstauszeichnung Awarded to army, navy, and air force Grades for 4, 8, 15, 25, and 40 Years of Service	SS Long Service Award SS-Dienstauszeichnungen Grades for 4, 12, 18, and 25 Years of Service

=== Arm shields ===
Narvik Shield, 1940	Crimea Shield, 1941–1942	Cholm Shield, 1942	Demyansk Shield, 1942	Kuban Shield, 1943	Warsaw Shield, 1944	Lapland Shield, 1944–1945

=== Campaign cuff titles ===
Crete Cuff Title, 1942	Africa Cuff Title, 1941–1943	Metz 1944 Cuff Title, 1944	Courland Cuff Title, 1944–1945

=== Military and paramilitary badges ===
==== Army/Waffen-SS war badges ====
Infantry Assault Badge	General Assault Badge	Close Combat Clasp	Marksmanship Badge with lanyard	Panzer Badge	Army Anti-Aircraft Badge	Parachutist Badge	Bandit-warfare Badge
Balloon Observer's Badge	Tank Destruction Badge	Sniper's Badge	Wound Badge	Army Mountain Guide Badge	Driver Proficiency Badge	Badge for Destruction of Low-Flying Aircraft	

==== Naval war badges ====
High Seas Fleet Badge	Destroyer War Badge	Minesweeper War Badge	Blockade Runner Badge	Fast Attack Craft War Badge
U-boat War Badge	Auxiliary Cruiser Badge	Naval Artillery War Badge	U-Boat Front Clasp	Naval Front Clasp

==== Luftwaffe badges & other awards ====
Combined Pilots-Observation Badge	Pilot's Badge	Parachutist Badge	Anti-Aircraft Flak Battle Badge	Ground Assault Badge of the Luftwaffe	Observer Badge
Glider Pilot Badge	Radio Operator Badge & Air Gunner Badge	Flyer's Commemorative Badge	Aircrew Badge	Sea Battle Badge	Luftwaffe Flying Clasps

The Luftwaffe maintained two non-portable awards, the "Honour Goblet of the Luftwaffe" (Ehrenpokal für besondere Leistung im Luftkrieg) and the "Luftwaffe Honour Plate" (Ehrenschale für hervorragende Kampfleistungen der Luftwaffe). Recipients of both awards automatically received the Luftwaffe Honour Roll Clasp in January 1944.

Honour Goblet of the Luftwaffe	''Luftwaffe'' Honour Plate	Honour Roll Clasp

=== Foreign volunteer awards ===
Blue Division Medal, Spain	Medal for Gallantry and Merit for Members of the Eastern Peoples In various grades, with and without swords	Schalburg Cross, Denmark	5th Don Cossack Regimental Cross	2nd Siberian Cossack Regimental Cross

== Order of precedence ==
Within the Wehrmacht, wartime awards (German: Kriegsorden) took precedence over peacetime decorations.

1. Grand Cross of the Iron Cross
2. Knight's Cross of the Iron Cross with Oak Leaves (and higher)
3. Golden Knights Cross of the War Merit Cross
4. Knight's Cross of the Iron Cross
5. Knight's Cross of the War Merit Cross
6. German Cross
7. Honour Roll Clasp
8. Führer Commendation Certificate
9. Honour Goblet & Plate of the Luftwaffe
10. Iron Cross 1st Class
11. War Merit Cross 1st Class
12. Iron Cross 2nd Class
13. Combat Clasp
14. Numbered war badges
15. Wound Badge
16. Tank Destruction Badge
17. Unnumbered war badges
18. Campaign shields & cuff titles
19. War Merit Cross 2nd Class
20. Ostvolk Decoration
21. Eastern Front Medal
22. War Merit Medal
23. Cross of Honour (1914–1918)
24. Spanish Cross
25. Qualification badges
26. Long-service awards
27. Commemorative medals
28. West Wall Medal
29. Foreign decorations

== See also ==
- Political decorations of the Nazi Party
