= Tank badge =

Tank badge may refer to:

- Tank Destruction Badge (German: Sonderabzeichen für das Niederkämpfen von Panzerkampfwagen durch Einzelkämpfer), WWII Nazi decoration for single-handedly destroying an enemy armoured vehicle
- Panzer Badge (German: Panzerkampfabzeichen), WWII Nazi decoration for participation in an armoured assault
- Luftwaffe Panzer Badge (German: Panzerkampfabzeichen der Luftwaffe), WWII Nazi decoration for Luftwaffe personnel who participated in armoured assaults
- Condor Legion Tank Badge (German: Panzertruppenabzeichen der Legion Condor), German decoration for Condor Legion tank crews in the Spanish Civil War
- Tank Memorial Badge (German: Kampfwagen-Erinnerungsabzeichen), Weimar Republic decoration for WWI armour crews
