= Memel Medal =

Medal awarded during interwar period in Nazi Germany

The Return of Memel Commemorative Medal Die Medaille zur Erinnerung an die Heimkehr des Memellandes 22. März 1939
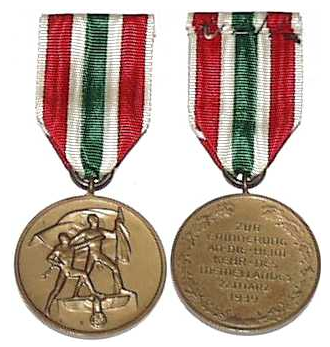
- The medal's obverse (left) and reverse (right).
- Type: Occupation medal
- Awarded for: Awarded to all German military personnel and others who participated in or contributed to the annexation of Memel
- Presented by: Nazi Germany
- Eligibility: Military personnel, others
- Campaign: 1939 German ultimatum to Lithuania
- Established: 1 May 1939
- Final award: 31 December 1940

Highlights
- Total: 31,322
- Ribbon bar of the medal

The Return of Memel Commemorative Medal (Medaille zur Erinnerung an die Heimkehr des Memellandes; 22. März 1939) was a decoration of Nazi Germany awarded during the interwar period, the last in a series of Occupation Medals.

== Description ==
Germany annexed the Klaipėda Region (Memel Territory) from Lithuania on 22 March 1939 after an ultimatum. On 23 March, the occupation of the city and district was carried out by German Army troops. This area of East Prussia, with 160,000 inhabitants, had been turned over to Lithuania in the aftermath of World War I. To commemorate the occupation, the "Memel Medal" was authorized on 1 May 1939. It was awarded until 31 December 1940. In all 31,322 medals were awarded.

The wearing of Nazi era awards was banned in 1945. The Memel Medal was not among those awards reauthorized for official wear by the Federal Republic of Germany in 1957.

== Design ==
The medal was designed by Professor Richard Klein. While the obverse was the same as the previous two occupation medals, the reverse was inscribed "Zur Erinnerung an die Heimkehr des Memellandes 22. März 1939" (To commemorate the return of the Memel District. 22 March 1939), surrounded by an oak leaf wreath. The award was presented to all military, political and civil personnel who had taken part in the entry into Memel on 22 March 1939, and to local Nazis who had worked for union with Germany.

The medal was die-struck in bronze and worn above the left tunic pocket suspended from a white ribbon with a green strip in the middle and two red strips on each side, the historic colors of Lithuania Minor.

== See also ==
- Anschluss Medal
- Sudetenland Medal
- Orders, decorations, and medals of Nazi Germany
