= Anschluss Medal =

Nazi Germany commemorative medal

The Anschluss Commemorative Medal
- Die Medaille zur Erinnerung an den 13. März 1938
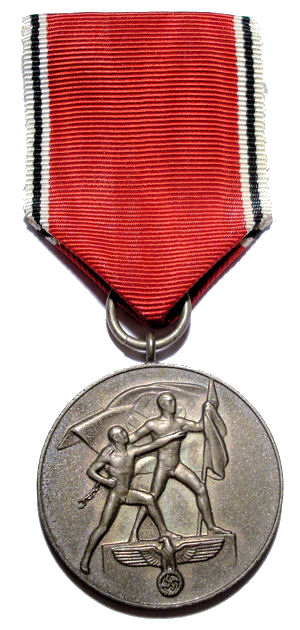
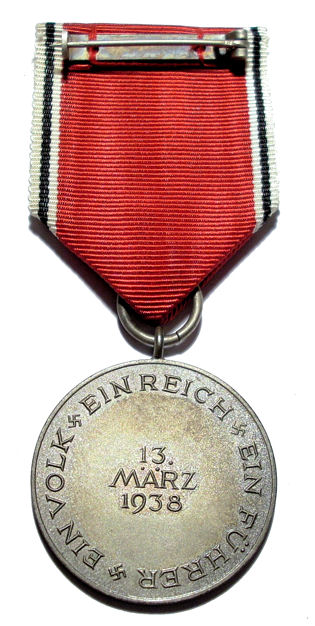
- The medal's obverse (left) and reverse (right).
- Type: Occupation medal
- Awarded for: German military personnel who participated in, and Austrians who contributed to, the Anschluss.
- Presented by: Nazi Germany
- Eligibility: Military personnel, members of the Austrian branch of the NSDAP, and others
- Campaign: Interwar period
- First award: 1 May 1938
- Final award: 31 December 1940

Highlights
- Total: 318,689
- Ribbon bar of the medal

The Anschluss Commemorative Medal (German: Die Medaille zur Erinnerung an den 13. März 1938) was a decoration of Nazi Germany awarded during the interwar period, and the first in a series of Occupation Medals.

== Description ==
Instituted on 1 May 1938, the medal commemorated the annexation of Austria by the German Reich, the so-called Anschluss. German troops crossed the Austrian border on 12 March 1938 without any resistance. The medal, known as the "Anschluss medal", was awarded to those, both military and civilian, who contributed to or participated in the annexation. This included German State officials and members of the German Wehrmacht and SS who entered Austria. Local Nazis who had worked for union with Germany also qualified, including the widows of those who had been killed for their cause. Last awarded on 31 December 1940, a total of 318,689 medals were bestowed.

The wearing of Nazi era awards was banned in 1945. The Anschluss medal was not among those awards reauthorized for official wear by the Federal Republic of Germany in 1957.

== Design ==
The circular, highly detailed, die-struck medal was based on the 1938 Party Day Badge and designed by Professor Richard Klein. On the obverse, a man holding the Nazi flag stands on a podium bearing the eagle emblem of the Third Reich; he assists a second man onto the podium, whose right arm bears a broken shackle. This symbolizes Austria's union with the larger Reich. On the reverse is the inscription "13. März 1938" (13 March 1938), the date of the Anschluss. The date is surrounded on the outer edge by the words, "Ein Volk, Ein Reich, Ein Führer" ("One People, One Nation, One Leader"). The medal is suspended from a red ribbon with white-black-white stripes at the edges of the ribbon. It was made of brass or tombac bronze with a silvered matte finish.

== See also ==
- German Occupation Medals
- Sudetenland Medal
- Memel Medal
- Orders, decorations, and medals of Nazi Germany
