= Richard Klein (artist) =

German artist

Richard Klein (January 7, 1890 – July 31, 1967) was a German artist, known for his work as a medallist from the start of World War I in 1914, and mainly for his work as a favoured artist of the Nazi regime. Klein was director of the Munich School of Applied Arts and was one of Adolf Hitler's favourite painters.

Klein was one of the artists exhibited at the Große Deutsche Kunstausstellung (Great German Art Exhibition) held at the Haus der Kunst in Munich in 1937, meant as a contrast to the modern art condemned by the Third Reich as degenerate art (entartete Kunst). Klein's work at the exhibition included plaques contributed from Hitler's private collection. The poster for the exhibition, Das Erwachen (The Awakening), was designed by Klein and also used as the front cover for the Nazi art periodical Die Kunst im Deutschen Reich (Art in the Third Reich).

Klein also designed Nazi awards and decorations. These included, the Sudetenland Medal, Anschluss Medal, and Memel Medal, collectively known as the German Occupation Medals, plus the War Merit Medal and the Wehrmacht Long Service Award.
