= Sudetenland Medal =

Decoration of Nazi Germany awarded in the interwar period

The 1 October 1938 Commemorative Medal (Sudetenland Medal) Die Medaille zur Erinnerung an den 1. Oktober 1938
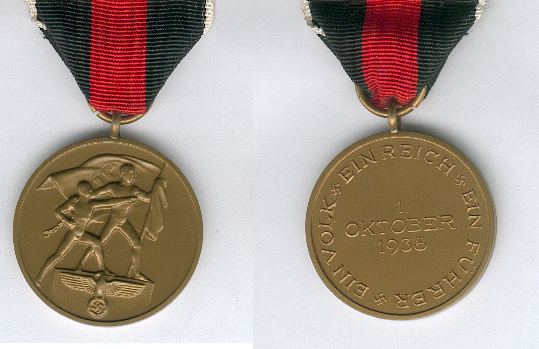
- The medal's obverse (left) and reverse (right)
- Type: Occupation medal
- Awarded for: Participation in the occupations of Sudetenland in October 1938 and Czechoslovakia in March 1939
- Presented by: Nazi Germany
- Eligibility: Military personnel and others
- Campaign: Interwar period
- Established: 18 October 1938
- Final award: 31 December 1940

Highlights
- Total: 1,162,617 medals and 134,563 bars
- The Prague Castle bar (Spange Prager Burg)

The 1 October 1938 Commemorative Medal (German: Die Medaille zur Erinnerung an den 1. Oktober 1938) was commonly known as the Sudetenland Medal. It was a decoration of Nazi Germany awarded during the interwar period, and the second in a series of Occupation Medals.

== Description ==
Instituted on 18 October 1938, the medal was awarded to participants in the occupations of Sudetenland in October 1938 and Czechoslovakia in March 1939.

The medal was awarded to all German State officials and members of the German Wehrmacht and SS who entered the Sudetenland on 18 October 1938, and to Sudeten Nazis who had worked for union with Germany. Later a special bar for attachment to the ribbon was introduced for participation in the occupation of the remnants of Czechoslovakia on 15 March 1939, and to others who rendered valuable support. Last awarded on 31 December 1940, a total of 1,162,617 medals and 134,563 bars were bestowed.

The wearing of Nazi era awards was banned in 1945. The Sudetenland medal was not among those awards reauthorized for official wear by the Federal Republic of Germany in 1957.

== Design ==
The medal was circular and similar in appearance as the Anschluss Medal, the reverse only differed in the date. It was designed by Professor Richard Klein. On the obverse a man holding the Nazi flag stands on a podium bearing the eagle emblem of Nazi Germany. He assists a second man onto the podium, whose right arm bears a broken shackle. This symbolizes the joining of the area to the Reich. On the reverse is the inscription date "1. Oktober 1938" (1 October 1938). The date is surrounded with the words "Ein Volk, Ein Reich, Ein Führer" (One People, One Nation, One Leader).

The medal was die-struck and high in detail, with a bronze finish. It was suspended from a striped black, red, black ribbon and white outer stripes, the colors of the Sudetenland.

== Prague Castle Bar ==
For those who had participated in both the annexation of the Sudetenland and the occupation of Bohemia and Moravia on 15 March 1939, a bronze Castle Bar (German: Spange Prager Burg), was approved on 1 May 1939. This bar featured the Prague Castle on the obverse with two triangular prongs in the back, which held it on the ribbon of the prior awarded Sudetenland medal. The bar, like the medal, was die-struck and high in detail, with a bronze finish.

== See also ==
- Anschluss Medal
- Memel Medal
- Orders, decorations, and medals of Nazi Germany

== Bibliography ==
- Angolia, John (1987). For Führer and Fatherland: Military Awards of the Third Reich. R. James Bender Publishing. ISBN 0-912138-14-9.
- Doehle, Heinrich (1995) [1943]. Medals & Decorations of the Third Reich: Badges, Decorations, Insignia. Reddick Enterprises. ISBN 0962488348.
- German Federal regulation (1996). Dienstvorschriften Nr. 14/97. Bezug: Anzugordnung für die Soldaten der Bundeswehr. ZDv 37/10 (in German).
- Littlejohn, David; Dodkins, Colonel C. M. (1968). Orders, Decorations, Medals and Badges of the Third Reich. R. James Bender Publishing, California. ISBN 978-0854200801.
