= German Occupation Medals =

The German Occupation Medals were a series of awards, also known as the "Flower War medals", created to commemorate the successive annexations by Nazi Germany of neighbouring countries and regions with large ethnic German populations. These comprised Austria (March 1938), the Sudetenland (October 1938) and Memel (March 1939). The occupation of the remainder of western Czechoslovakia (March 1939) was marked by the 'Prague Bar', worn on the ribbon of the Sudetenland Medal.

== The awards ==
Anschluss Medal
(1938)

Sudetenland Medal
(1938)

Prague Castle bar
(1939)

Memel Medal
(1939)

All three medals have a common obverse designed by Professor Richard Klein, Director of the Munich School of Applied Arts and a favoured artist of the Nazi establishment.

The criteria for each of the medals and the Prague bar were broadly the same. They were awarded to those, both military and civilian, who participated in or contributed to the occupation, including members of the German Wehrmacht, German State officials and local Nazi supporters who had worked for union with Germany.

The wearing of Nazi era awards was banned in 1945. Occupation medals were not among those awards reauthorized for official wear by the Federal Republic of Germany in 1957.

A Campaign streamer (German: Fahnenband) in the colours of the appropriate medal ribbon could be attached to the flag of those regiments that had taken part in these occupations.

== See also ==
- Anschluss - The German annexation of Austria
- Occupation of Czechoslovakia by Nazi Germany
- Annexation of Memel
- Interwar period
