= Driver Proficiency Badge =

German World War II service badge

Driver Proficiency Badge (Wehrmacht) Kraftfahrbewährungsabzeichen
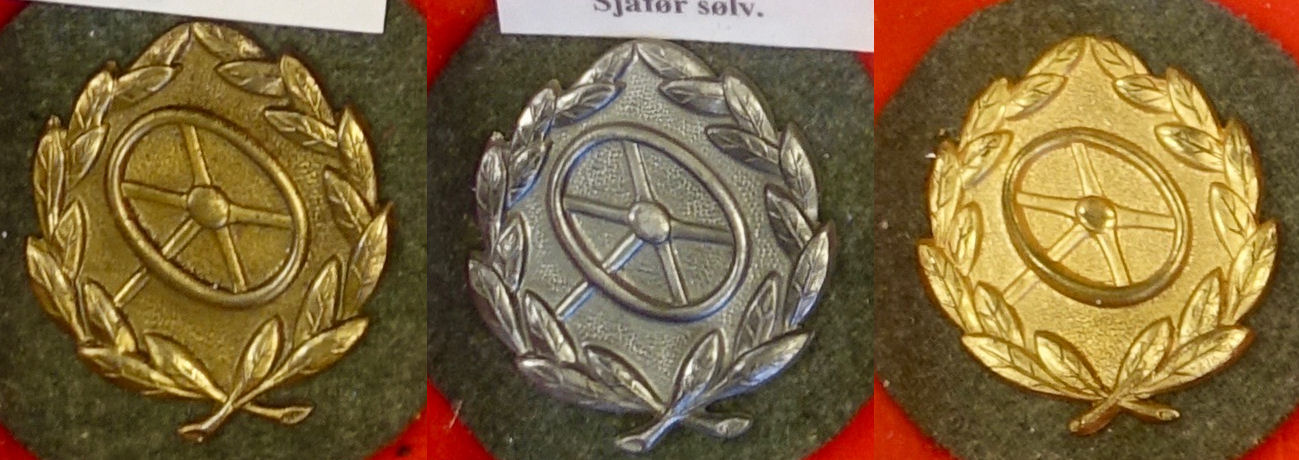
- Drivers badge in bronze, silver and gold
- Type: Badge
- Description: Small badge worn on left forearm
- Presented by: Nazi Germany
- Eligibility: Drivers of military transport vehicles
- Campaign: World War II
- Status: Obsolete
- Established: 23 October 1942

Highlights
- Total recipients: C. 65.000

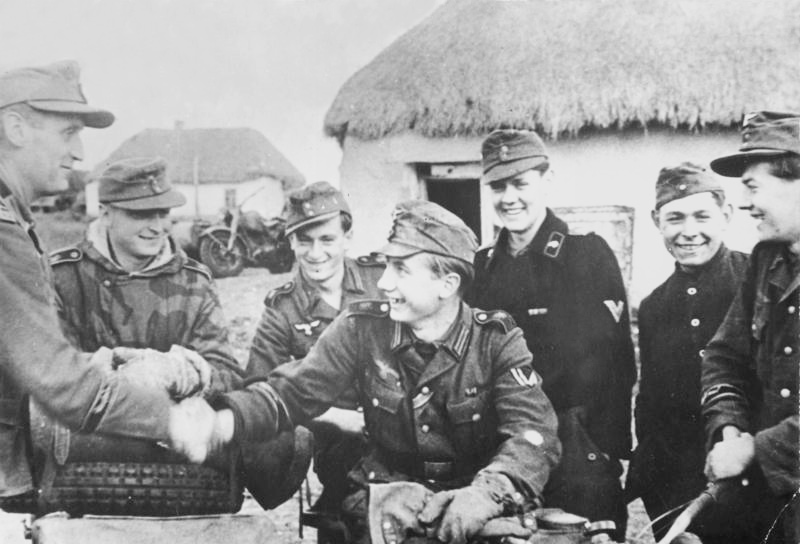
Army motorcyclist with badge on his left forearm

The Driver Proficiency Badge (German: Kraftfahrbewährungsabzeichen) was a German military badge awarded to drivers of military transport vehicles during World War II.

== Eligibility ==
The Driver Proficiency Badge was established on 23 October 1942 to reward drivers of military transport vehicles, including trucks, cars and motorcycles, who served for specified periods in a war zone after 1 December 1940. Both service personnel and civilian drivers under Wehrmacht command could qualify, as could foreign volunteers, but not members of forces allied to Germany.

The requirement for the award was to have served since 1 December 1940 on the front line or in rear areas on the Balkan, North African and Eastern Fronts, with other areas added as the war progressed. The qualifying period depended on the type of vehicle driven. For the bronze badge this was:

- motorbike reconnaissance and dispatch riders: 90 days;
- supply vehicles supporting the front line: 120 days;
- other forms of military transport: 135 days. (Note: Figures from Littlejohn and Dodkins. Other sources differ as to the number of qualification days for each type of vehicle.)

The silver badge was awarded where these requirements were met for a second time; with the gold for a third time. The badge could be awarded for shorter periods where drivers faced particularly arduous conditions, or for special driving achievement. Awards were authorised by battalion commanders and above or, for civilians, by the Ministry of the Interior.

The award could be forfeited, for example if the recipient drove dangerously or failed to maintain his vehicle. It could not be awarded posthumously.

== Design and wear ==
The badge consists of a laurel wreath, 44 mm high and 41mm wide, containing a depiction of a steering wheel. It was made from iron or zinc alloy, with the appropriate colour finish. Attached to a fabric base, it was sewn on the uniform jacket above the left cuff.

Wear of Nazi era awards was banned in 1945. In 1957 the Driver Proficiency Badge was among the World War II decorations re-authorised for wear by qualifying veterans by the Federal Republic of Germany. While many awards were re-designed to remove the swastika, the original Driver Proficiency Badge could be worn unaltered as it did not bear this symbol. Members of the Bundeswehr who earned the badge during the war could wear it on the ribbon bar, represented by a small replica of the award on a field grey ribbon.

== See also ==
- Orders, decorations, and medals of Nazi Germany

== Sources ==
- Klietmann, Kurt-Gerhard (1981). Auszeichnungen des Deutschen Reiches. 1936–1945, 11 Auflage (in German). Motorbuch, Stuttgart. ISBN 3-87943-689-4.
- Littlejohn, David; Dodkins, Colonel C. M. (1968). Orders, Decorations, Medals and Badges of the Third Reich. R. James Bender Publishing, California. ISBN 978-0854200801.
- Michaelis, Rolf (2008). Deutsche Kriegsauszeichnungen 1939-1945 Heer - Waffen-SS - Polizei (in German). Winkelried Verlag, Leisnig. ISBN 978-3930849314.
