= Condor Legion Tank Badge =

Nazi German campaign award

Condor Legion Tank Badge Panzertruppenabzeichen der Legion Condor
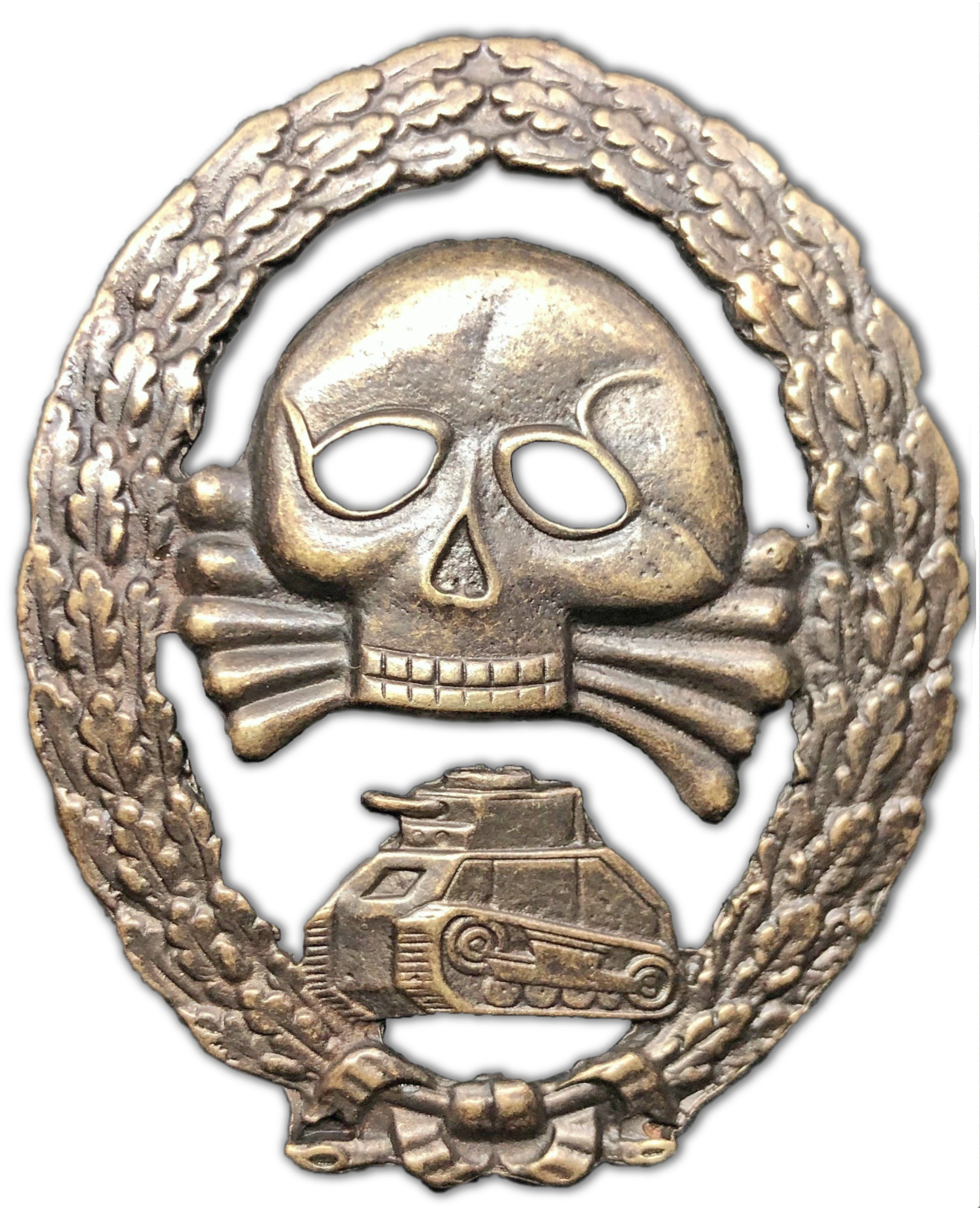
- The Condor Legion Tank Badge
- Type: Badge
- Awarded for: Service with tank forces
- Description: Pin-back oval badge
- Presented by: Nazi Germany
- Eligibility: Members of the Condor Legion
- Campaigns: Spanish Civil War, 1936–39
- Status: Obsolete
- Established: Instituted: 18 July 1936. Official approval: 10 July 1939

Highlights
- Total recipients: 415

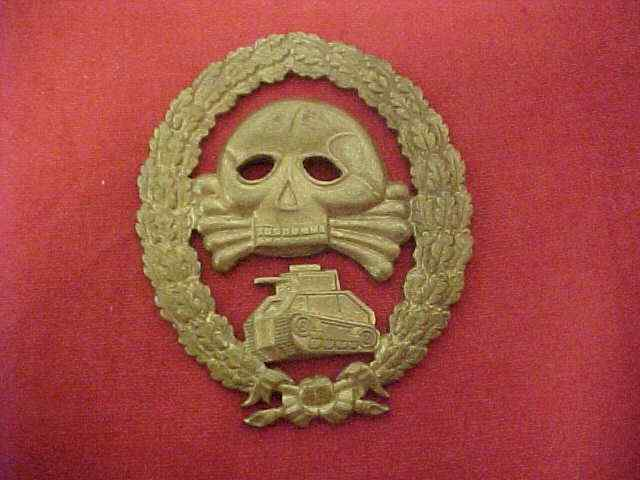
Bronze version of the badge

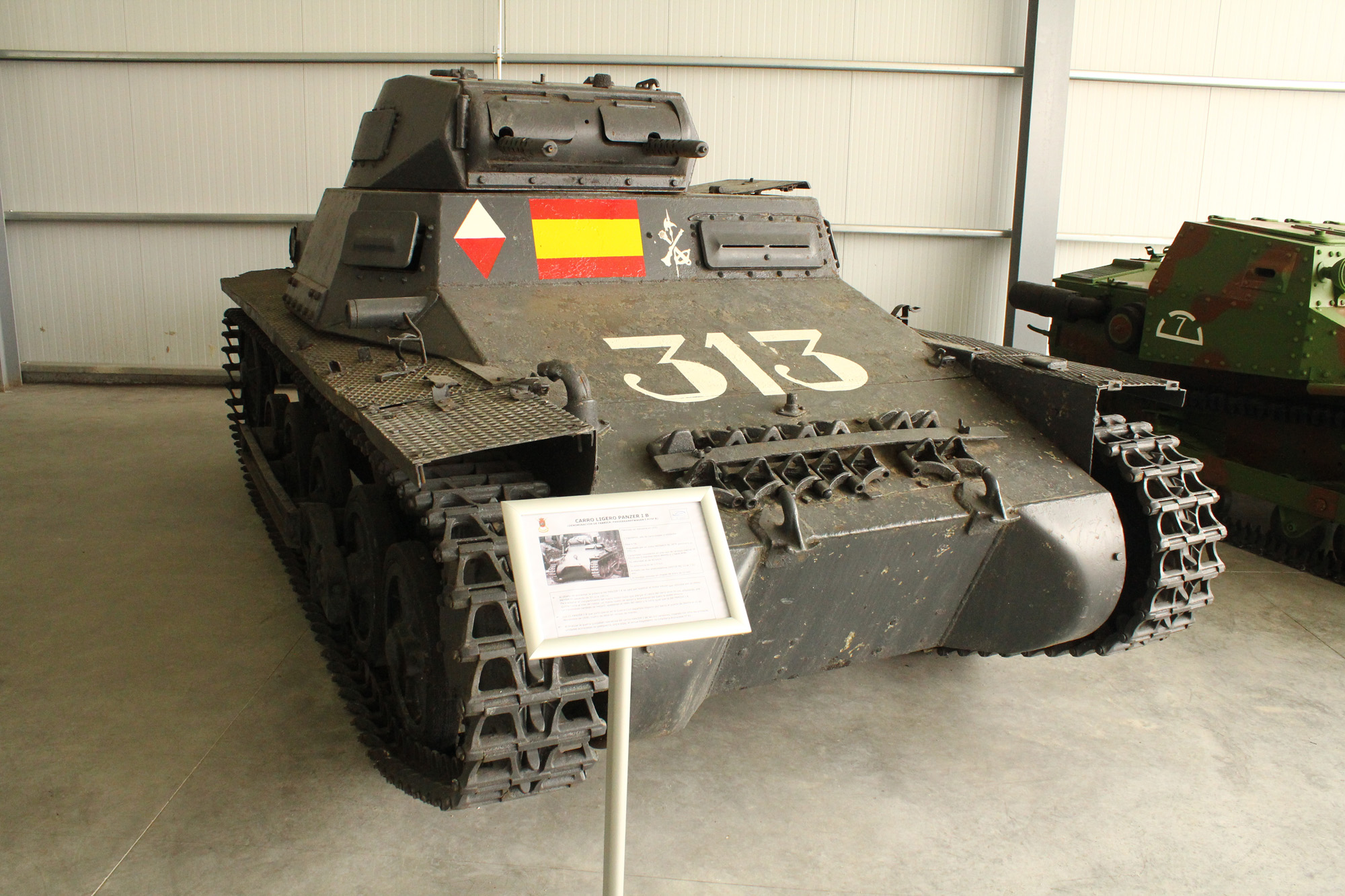
German Panzer I tank of type used by the Condor Legion

The Condor Legion Tank Badge (German: Panzertruppenabzeichen der Legion Condor) was a German military decoration awarded to tank crews who served with the German Condor Legion during the Spanish Civil War, 1936–1939.

== Eligibility ==
The Condor Legion was established in July 1936 to provide direct military support to the Nationalists during the Spanish Civil War. The Legion, consisting of members of the German Wehrmacht, included armoured units equipped with Panzer I light tanks under the command of Colonel Wilhelm Ritter von Thoma. The Legion continued to serve in Spain until the end of the war in April 1939.

The Tank Badge was created in September 1936 by Colonel Von Thoma, and was recognised as an official award of the German state on 10 July 1939. It was awarded to tank crews who had served for at least three months in the Spanish theatre of war. Issue of the badge was discontinued in the autumn of 1939, by which time 415 had been awarded.

== Design and wear ==
The badge consists of an oval wreath of oakleaves containing a skull and crossbones above a representation of a German Panzer I tank. The skull and crossbones were derived from the cap insignia of the tank troops of Legion Condor. The design is similar to the Tank Memorial Badge awarded to tank crews who served in World War I. It was issued in both white metal and bright bronze, with a gold version presented to Colonel von Thoma in 1939 after a victory parade in Madrid to mark the end of the Civil War.

The badge was worn on the left breast pocket.

The wear of Nazi era awards was banned in 1945. The Condor Legion Tank Badge was not among the Nazi era awards reauthorised for official wear by the Federal Republic of Germany in 1957.

== See also ==
- Orders, decorations, and medals of Nazi Germany
- Spanish Cross of the Condor Legion
- Panzer Badge (World War II)

== Sources ==
- Klietmann, Kurt-Gerhard (1981). Auszeichnungen des Deutschen Reiches. 1936–1945, 11 Auflage (in German). Motorbuch, Stuttgart. ISBN 3-87943-689-4.
- Littlejohn, David; Dodkins, Colonel C. M. (1968). Orders, Decorations, Medals and Badges of the Third Reich. R. James Bender Publishing, California. ISBN 978-0854200801.
- Thomas, Hugh (1961). The Spanish Civil War. Eyre and Spottiswoode, London.
- German Federal regulation (1996). Dienstvorschriften Nr. 14/97. Bezug: Anzugordnung für die Soldaten der Bundeswehr. ZDv 37/10 (in German).
- "Panzertruppenabzeichen der Legion Condor". Lexikon der Wehrmacht (in German).
