= Parachutist badge =

Military badge rewarding parachute training completion

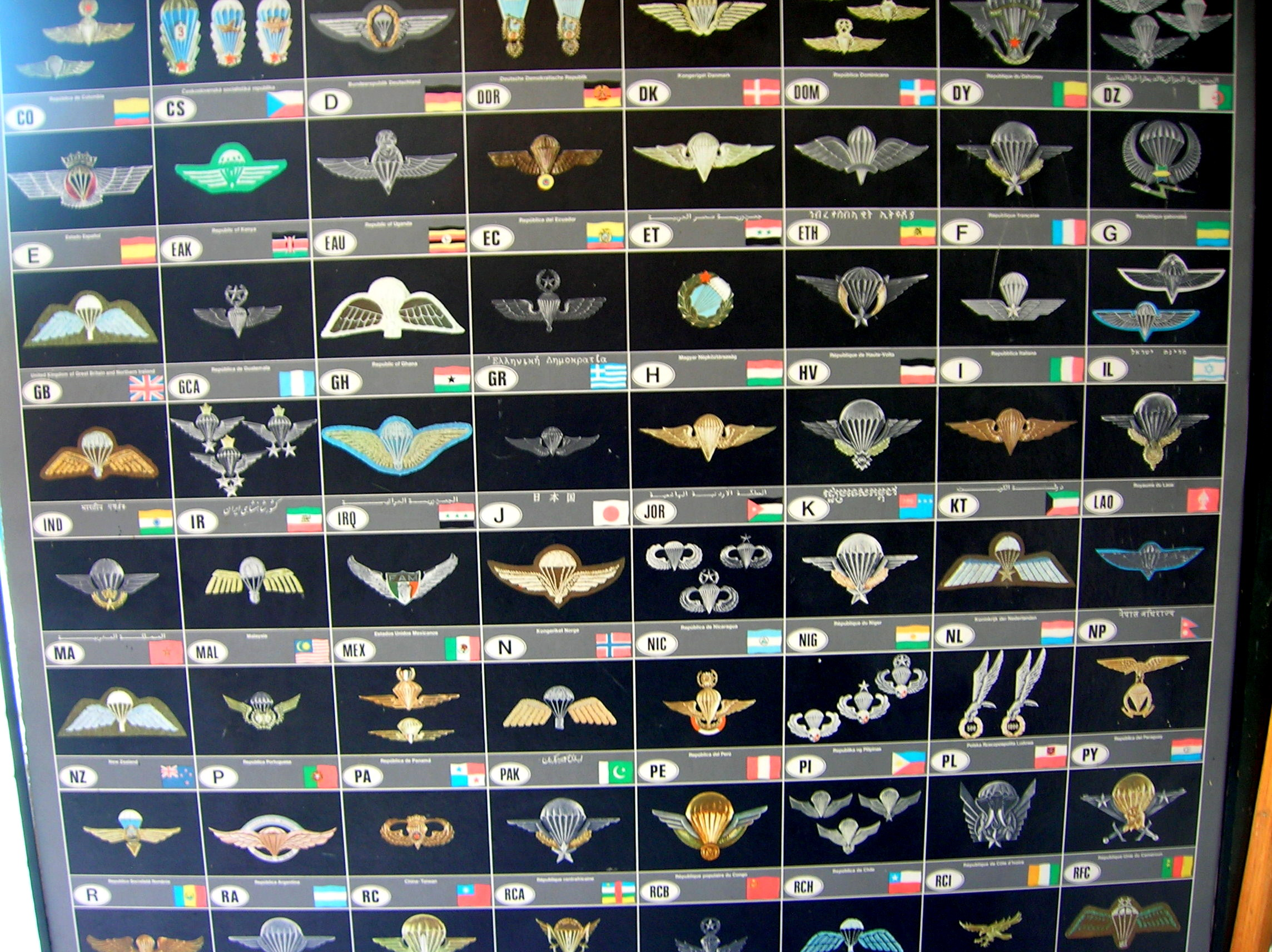
Paratrooper badges of various states' militaries.

A parachutist badge (or parachutist brevet) is a badge awarded by armed forces or paramilitary forces (e.g. certain law enforcement agencies) of many states to personnel who have received parachute training and completed the required number of jumps. It is difficult to assess which country was the first to introduce such an award.

== France ==
=== Army ===
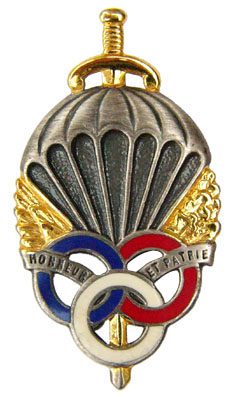

The School of Airborne Troops oversees different courses.

==== Military Parachute Trainee ====
The Military Parachute Trainee Badge (French: Brevet de préparation militaire parachutiste (PMP)) is a badge created in 1965 and aimed at reservists and national service personnel. The laureates of the badge could serve in airborne units and eventually train at the Airborne School for the Military Parachute Badge in a short course. Since the end of conscription in France, the PMP Badge is awarded to prospective soldiers in airborne units after a 4-week course.

==== Military Parachute Initiation ====
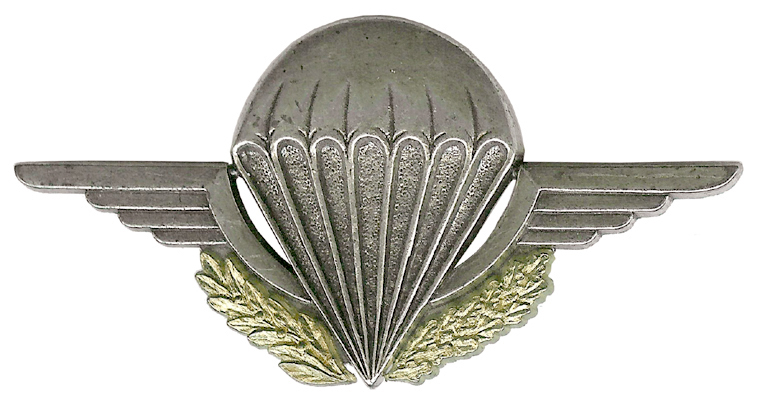

The Military Parachuting Initiation Badge (French: Brevet d'initiation au parachutisme militaire (BIPM)) was created in 1980 and aimed at military personnel outside of airborne units. It was awarded for four daytime jumps. The BIMP course was closed in 1994 for French personnel, but the badge is still awarded to members of foreign militaries after a short course at the Airborne School.

==== Military Parachute ====
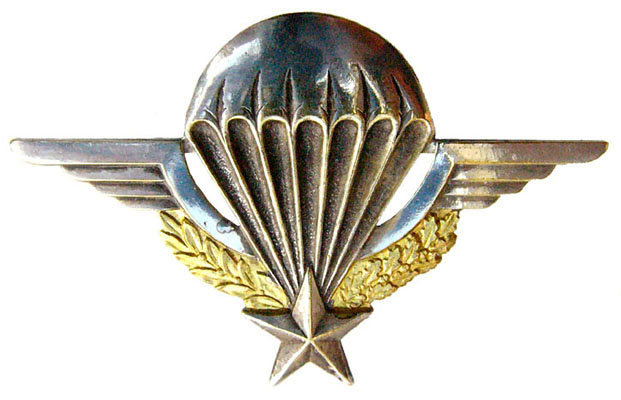

The Military Parachute Badge (French: Brevet parachutiste militaire (BPM)) is the standard course for every personnel in airborne units and all graduates of the école spéciale militaire de Saint-Cyr. It was created in 1946 and is awarded for six jumps, three daylight standard jumps, one daylight jump with the reserve parachute, one night jump without equipment, one night jump with full gear and equipment.

==== Parachute Monitor ====
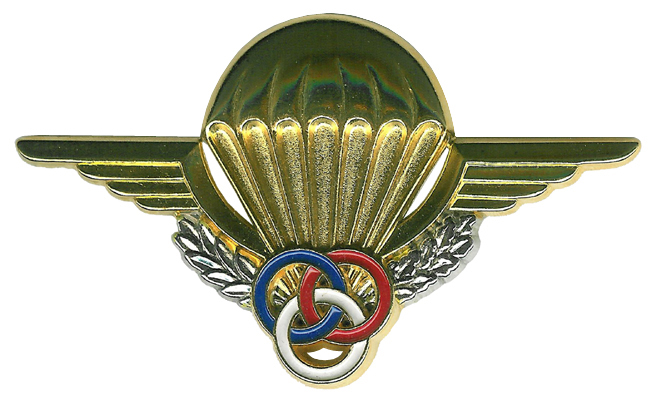

The Parachutist Monitor Badge (French: Brevet de moniteur parachutiste) is awarded to long-serving NCO in airborne units. Its graduates can teach the basics of parachute jumping to trainees, act as technical advisors on parachute matters and be jumpmasters both in units or at the Airborne Schools.

==== Operational Free Fall ====
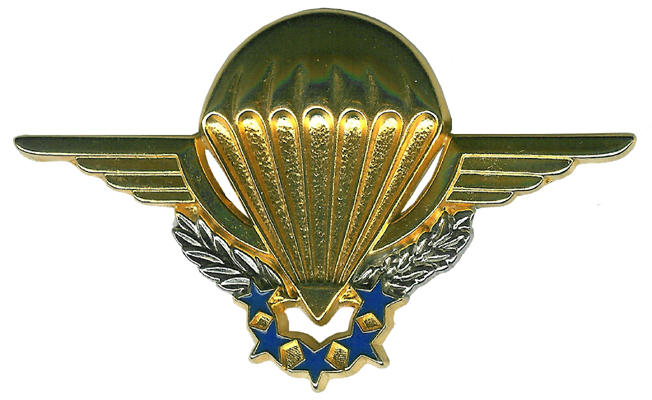

The Operational Free Fall Badge (French: Brevet de chuteur opérationnel) is awarded to graduates of long courses in Military Free Fall techniques. All graduates must have at least finished the Military Parachute Course and have some years of experience in airborne units. The Operational Free Fall Badge is part of the pipeline training for special forces and for commando platoons within the Airborne units.

==== High-altitude Parachute Instructor ====
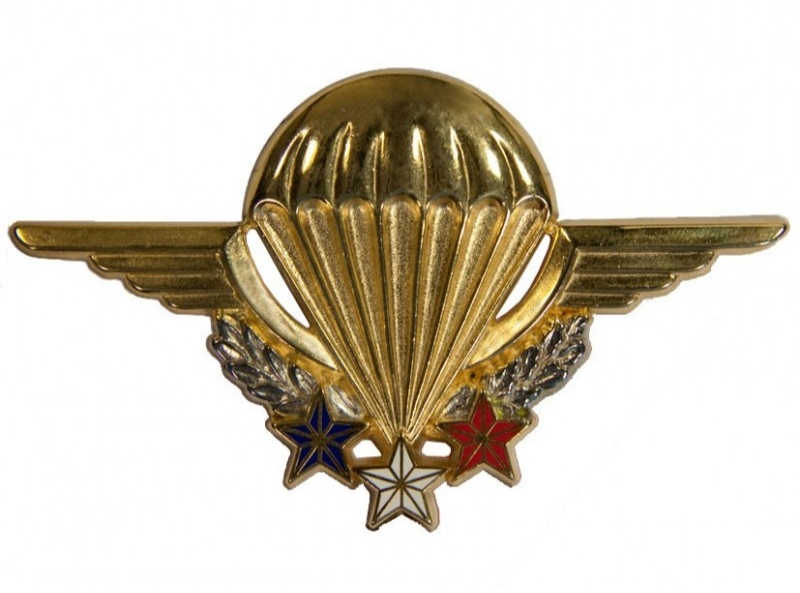

The High-altitude Parachute Instructor (French: Brevet d'instructeur au saut en ouverture commandée retardée (INSOCR)) is awarded to long-serving NCO in airborne units wishing to become jumpmasters in Free Fall jumping. All graduates must have finished the Operational Free Fall course and serve some years in an airborne unit using HALO/HAHO techniques.

=== Air Force ===
There is no Airborne School in the Air Force; jump training is held at the (Army) Airborne School, but the Air Force uses some specific badges for advanced parachute training.

==== Military Parachute Initiation ====
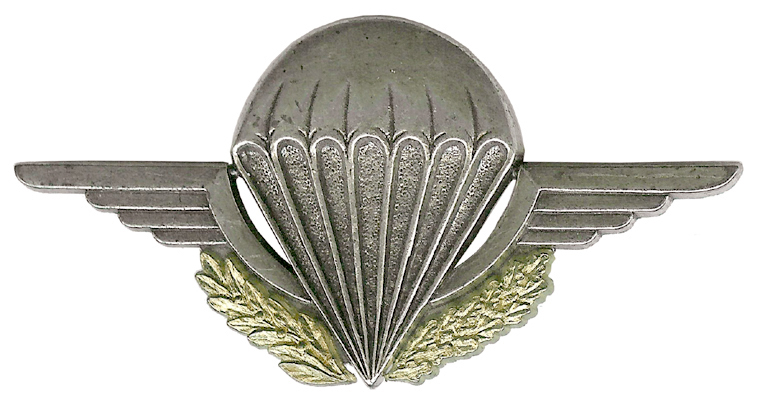

The Military Parachuting Initiation Badge is awarded to graduates of a short course at the (Army) Airborne School, where the only students are Air Force cadets. It is awarded after four daytime jumps.

==== Military Parachute Badge ====
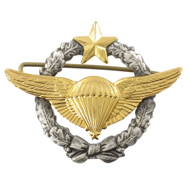

The Military Parachute Badge (Air Force) is awarded to Air Force personnel, already graduates of the (Army) Airborne School, serving in the Fusiliers Commandos de l'Air, the airborne infantry units of the Air Force. A minimum of 30 jumps is required for the award of the Air Force badge.

==== Special Parachute ====
The Special Parachute Badge (French : Brevet de parachutiste spécialisé) is the Free Fall badge of the Air Force. It is awarded after long courses at both the (Army) Airborne School and the Fusiliers Commandos Training Squadron.

== Germany ==
=== Nazi Germany ===
- Parachutist Badge (Nazi Germany), a World War II-era decoration in the Wehrmacht and the Waffen-SS.

=== German Democratic Republic ===
Members of the Army Air Assault Regiment 40 of the German Democratic Republic's National People's Army were awarded the parachutist badge upon completion of the paratrooper training course.

=== Federal Republic of Germany ===
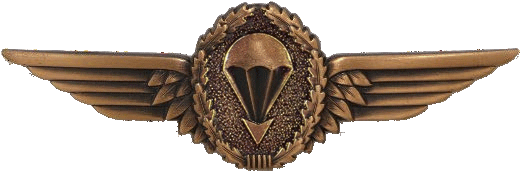
Parachutist badge in bronze

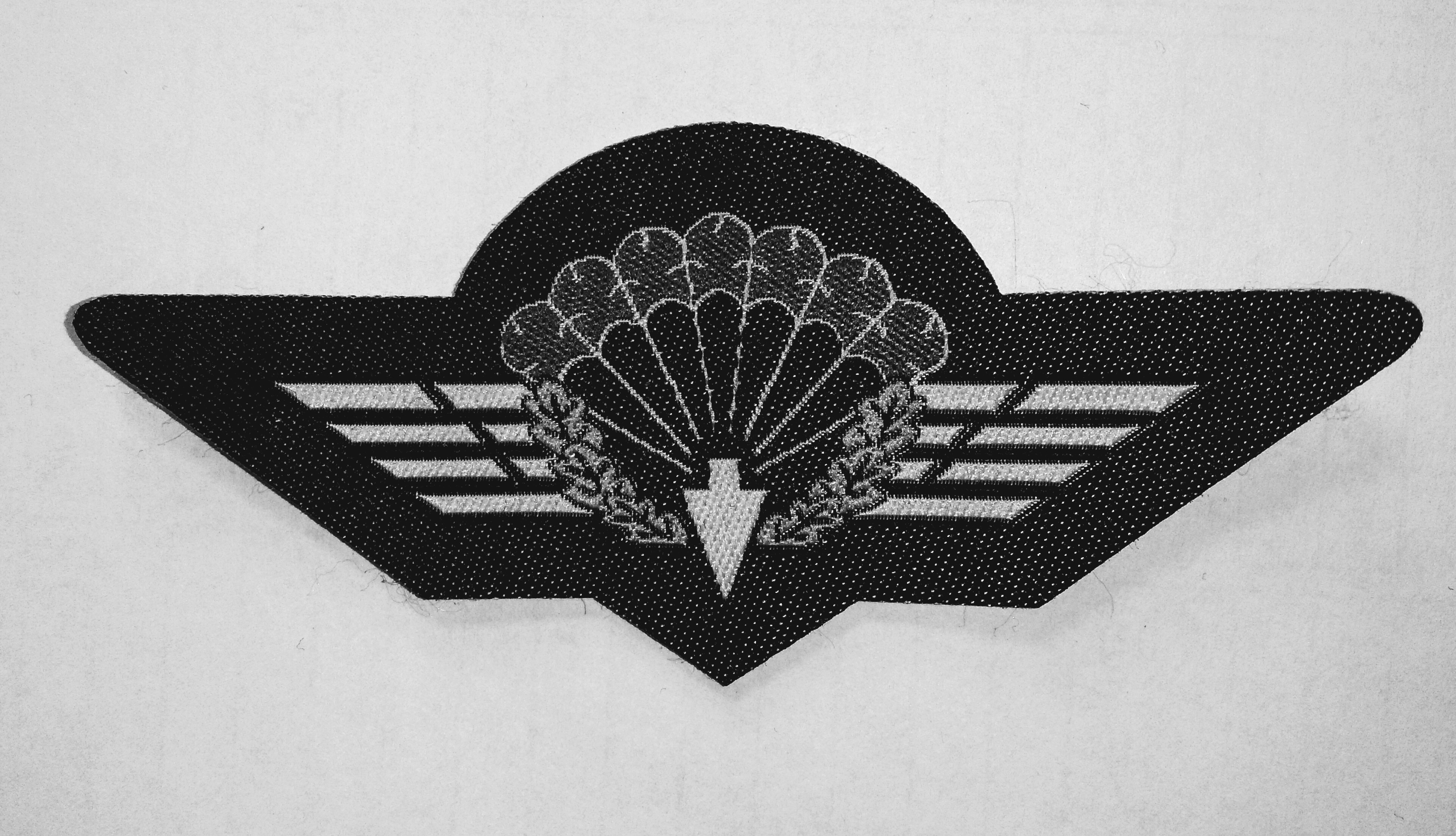
GSG9 parachutist badge of the Federal Police of Germany

Military
The parachutist badge of the Bundeswehr is awarded upon completion of the parachutist course conducted at the Airborne/Air mobile school at Altenstadt, Germany.

Allied forces who complete the requirements may also be awarded the German parachutist badge.

The badge is awarded in three levels:

Level I	Bronze	Completion of basic course and five jumps
Level II	Silver	20 jumps
Level III	Gold	50 jumps

The badge features a stylized parachute surrounded by a wreath of oak leaves which are flanked on the left and right side by stylized wings.

Federal Police
Members of the Federal Police's GSG9 who are specially qualified in parachuting, including High-altitude military parachuting and are assigned to the parachuting section are awarded the GSG9's parachutist badge.

== Hungary ==
Hungarian 1940M Parachutist Badge

Since 14 December 2021, Hungarian Defence Forces parachute-qualified personnel are permitted to wear an embroidered version of the 1940 skull and crossed knives badge again. It is formally called 1940/2021M Parachutist Badge.

== India ==
Regimental badge

Parachute Wings

Balidan Badge

The regimental badge for the Parachute Regiment is an open parachute, partially behind a circle with the word "Parachute" at the top and a scroll at the bottom with the word "Regiment"; wings are spread out from the circle, and a dagger is superimposed on the parachute and upper portion of the circle; the whole in silver metal. As with much of the world's parachute forces, the normal headgear is a maroon beret, although there is a maroon turban for Sikh personnel.

The special forces, which form part of the Parachute Regiment, have a distinct insignia called Balidaan, which has a commando dagger point downwards, with upward-extending wings extending from the blade and a scroll superimposed on the blade with "Balidaan" inscribed in Devanagari; the whole in silver metal on an upright red plastic rectangle.

== Italy ==
The Italian Armed Forces issue four different degrees of the Military Parachutist Badge, common to all services, as follows:

- Military Parachutist (Paracadutista Militare). The basic military qualification badge.
- War Parachutist (Paracadutista di Guerra). Same as the Military Parachutist Badge, but in golden metal. Awarded as an honor mark to WW2 paratrooper veterans, and to present-day paratroopers after 30 years of jump-status.
- Jumpmaster Parachutist (Paracadutista Direttore di Lancio). Same as the Military Parachutist Badge, but on a red cloth background.
- High-Altitude Launch Qualified Raider (Incursore Abilitato all'Effettuazione di Lanci ad Alta Quota). Similar to the US Military Freefall Parachutist Badge, awarded only to Special Forces personnel.

Military personnel qualified and a civilian parachutist can be allowed to use the relative insignia on the uniform, called the Jump Qualified Parachutist badge (Paracadutista Abilitato al Lancio). The Qualified Parachutist badge is awarded by the Italian Army and is similar to the Military Parachutist one, but without the star.

Military Parachutist - Italy

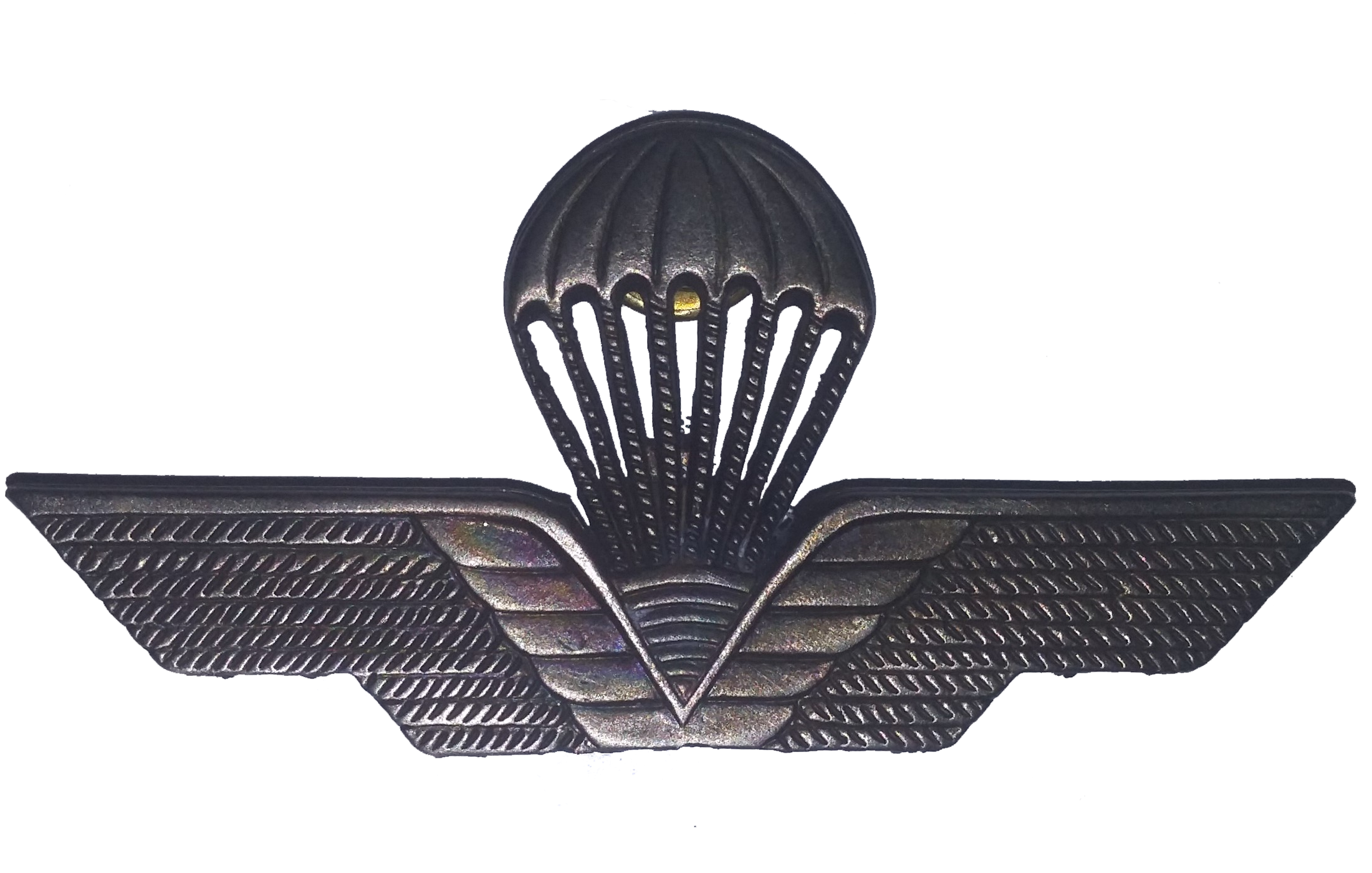
Qualified Parachutist - Italy

== The Netherlands ==
=== School ===
Parachute courses are conducted by the "Defensie Para School". The Armed Forces of the Netherlands recognize nine types of parachutist wings:

==== B brevet (Automatic Opening/Static Line) ====
Prerequisite: 5 jumps. The certificate and brevet are awarded by the Dutch sport parachute centres at Texel and Teuge, and may also be awarded by other Dutch centres if authorized. It is also awarded to foreign jumpers who qualify on Dutch soil.

==== A brevet, Operational Parachutist, Static Line ====
Prerequisite: 8 jumps, with the last 3 completed with gear and weapon, and the final jump at night. Maximum altitude: 400 meters. The course is completed by members of the 11th Airmobile Brigade and the Royal Netherlands Marine Corps.

==== SLS brevet, Operational Parachutist, Static Line, Square ====
Same requirements as the A brevet, with the last jump completed with gear and weapon at night. Only awarded to reconnaissance platoons of the Royal Netherlands Marine Corps.

==== C brevet, Operational Parachutist, Free Fall ====
Prerequisite: 20 jumps, including 3 with gear and weapon, 2 night jumps (one with gear and weapon). Maximum altitude: ±4,000 meters. All Army Commandos complete this course during Phase 3 of the Korps Commandotroepen Course, as do members of the NLMARSOF of the Royal Netherlands Marine Corps.

==== C-OPS brevet, Operational Parachutist, Free Fall ====
Prerequisite: 10 jumps, performed both during the day and night; 8 jumps with gear, navigation console, and weapon, 5 of which must include a backpack. Maximum altitude: 4,000 meters, with 3 precision jumps. This advanced course follows the C brevet and focuses on group jumps. It is intended for Army Commando operators.

==== D brevet, HALO/HAHO ====
Prerequisites depend on the student’s proficiency. Jumps are conducted at a maximum altitude of 10,000 meters using oxygen. The course is only completed by Commando groups specialized in HALO/HAHO jumps, as well as instructors of the Parachutist Training Group.

==== Operational Wings ====
A rare award, last issued to a member on 10 March 1949 in Indonesia. It was awarded again for the first time since 1949 to 9 members of the Korps Commandotroepen, Task Force 55, after a successful insertion in Afghanistan in 2009; the second time in 2016 to 32 members of the Korps Commandotroepen, Special Operations Land Task Group in Mali, after a successful insertion in 2015; and the third time in 2017 to 8 members of the NLMARSOF Land Task Group in Mali, also following a successful insertion in 2015.

==== Dispatcher/Instructor wing ====
Awarded after completion of the dispatcher course, recognizing proficiency in both Static Line and Free Fall.

== Philippines ==
The Armed Forces of the Philippines (AFP) Parachutist Badge also known as the "Airborne Badge" is awarded by the Chief of Staff, AFP to AFP Personnel, Military Cadets, and Officer Candidates who have satisfactorily completed the requirements of the Basic Airborne Course set forth in the POI conducted by the Airborne School, Special Forces Regiment (Airborne).

== Poland ==
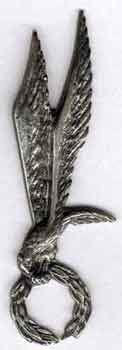
Polish "Odznaka Spadochronowa"

The Polish Odznaka Spadochronowa was based on the previous award called the Odznaka Pilota Wojskowego, or Military Pilot Badge. It was first introduced by notable Polish sculptor Władysław Gruberski in 1919 and was accepted shortly afterwards as the sign of all the pilots of the Polish Air Forces. The badge featured an eagle with wide spread wings, holding a laurel wreath in his bill.

In 1941, after the creation of the UK-trained 1st Independent Parachute Brigade, a similar symbol was adopted as the sign of all Polish paras. It featured a diving silver eagle. The symbol was also adopted by the cichociemni and nowadays is used by all branches of the Polish Army. Also, the Polish special unit GROM adopted a modified version of the symbol as its emblem. It is commonly (though informally) referred to as gapa (diving Eagle).

== Singapore ==
The Silver Wings is awarded upon successful completion of the Basic Airborne Course conducted by the Parachute Training Wing, School of Commandos. First awarded to the pioneering batch of 27 NSFs from 2nd Company, 1st Commando Battalion (1 CDO BN) of the Commandos formation, it comprises a pair of outspread wings on both wigs of a deployed parachute, with the word "SINGAPURA" below the canopy. With the design sanctioned by 1 CDO BN's Commanding Officer, Tan Kim Peng Clarence, it is differentiated by a crimson velvet backing for Commandos, while those of the Commando Parachute Jump Instructors have a golden velvet backing. Non-Commandos wear the badge without any backing.

== Spain ==
Spanish "Rokiski"

The Spanish Air Force instituted in 1946 their own uniform regulations, which included the parachutist badge known as Rokiski, awarded to all the soldiers who completed the Basic Airborne Course in the Paratrooper Military School (Escuela Militar de Paracaidismo) "Méndez Parada" along with the title of Paratrooper Hunter (Cazador Paracaidista). Personnel with this badge can only wear it while in service in a paratrooper unit or if the permanent status is awarded. Permanent status is granted to military personnel if:

- Has been 2 or more years in a paratrooper unit.
- A service related injury prevent him/her from staying 2 or more years in a paratrooper unit.
- Has jumped at least 3 times in enemy territory in a conflict zone.

== United States ==
The United States Parachutist Badge (also commonly referred to as "Jump Wings") is a military badge of the United States Armed Forces.

After making five more jumps in a jump billet, members of the Navy and Marine Corps are authorized to wear the gold wings of Naval and Marine parachutists in lieu of their initial award of the Basic Parachutist Badge. There are three versions of the Parachutist Badge. The United States Coast Guard is the only service which does not issue a Parachutist Badge and does not have personnel serving on jump status; however, Coast Guard members are entitled to receive the Parachutist Badge of another service if the proper training was received. The badge is awarded to U.S. Armed Forces personnel upon completion of the United States Army Airborne School Basic Airborne Course or freefall parachute training at the United States Air Force Academy.

If awarded, Army parachutists who meet the qualifications and jump with a foreign service may also wear one set of foreign wings on their Class A uniform. According to AFI36-2903, page 139 (edition of 2 August 2006), Air Force personnel may wear foreign-awarded jump wings while stationed in the awarding country or attending an official or social function hosted by the awarding government, and if the recipient has already been awarded US jump wings.

The original Parachutist Badge was designed in 1941 by Lieutenant General (then Captain) William P. Yarborough and approved by the Department of the Army in March of that year. In addition to the Parachutist Badge, U.S. Army paratroopers wore a "paraglider" patch on the front left side (enlisted) or right side (officers) of the garrison cap. Until the late 1940s, glider units were also included within Airborne divisions, hence the parachute and glider on the cap. The garrison cap with the paraglider patch was replaced by the maroon beret. Troops of the 101st Airborne Division (Air Assault), a former parachute unit, continued to wear the garrison cap with patch until the black beret was adopted Army-wide except for of organizations already wearing maroon (Airborne) or green (Special Forces) berets, and or switched from black to tan (Ranger).

The U.S Navy and Marine Corps Parachutist Insignia was originally known as the U.S. Navy Certified Parachute Rigger badge and designed by American Insignia Company in 1942 for graduates of the U.S. Navy Parachute Rigger School. During WWII, despite being against uniform regulations it became common for U.S. Marine Corps paratroopers who were issued the silver U.S. Army Basic Parachutist badge to wear the gold Navy Certified Parachute Rigger badge because they believed the gold "Rigger wings" looked better on their uniform. This unauthorized wear of the Parachute Rigger badge became so common that in July 1963 the Commander of United States Marine Corps Force Reconnaissance Bruce F. Meyers sent a request to Chief of Naval Operations Admiral George W. Anderson Jr. via Marine Corps Commandant General David M. Shoup requesting to officially make the Navy Parachute Rigger badge the parachutist badge for the Navy and Marine Corps. The request was approved by Admiral Anderson on 12 July 1963 per BuPers Notice 1020. Since 1963, being a graduate of the U.S. Navy Parachute Rigger School is no longer a requirement to earn the badge.

Parachutist Badge

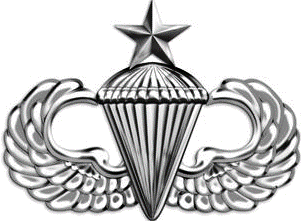
Senior Parachutist Badge

Master Parachutist Badge

Military Freefall Parachutist Badge

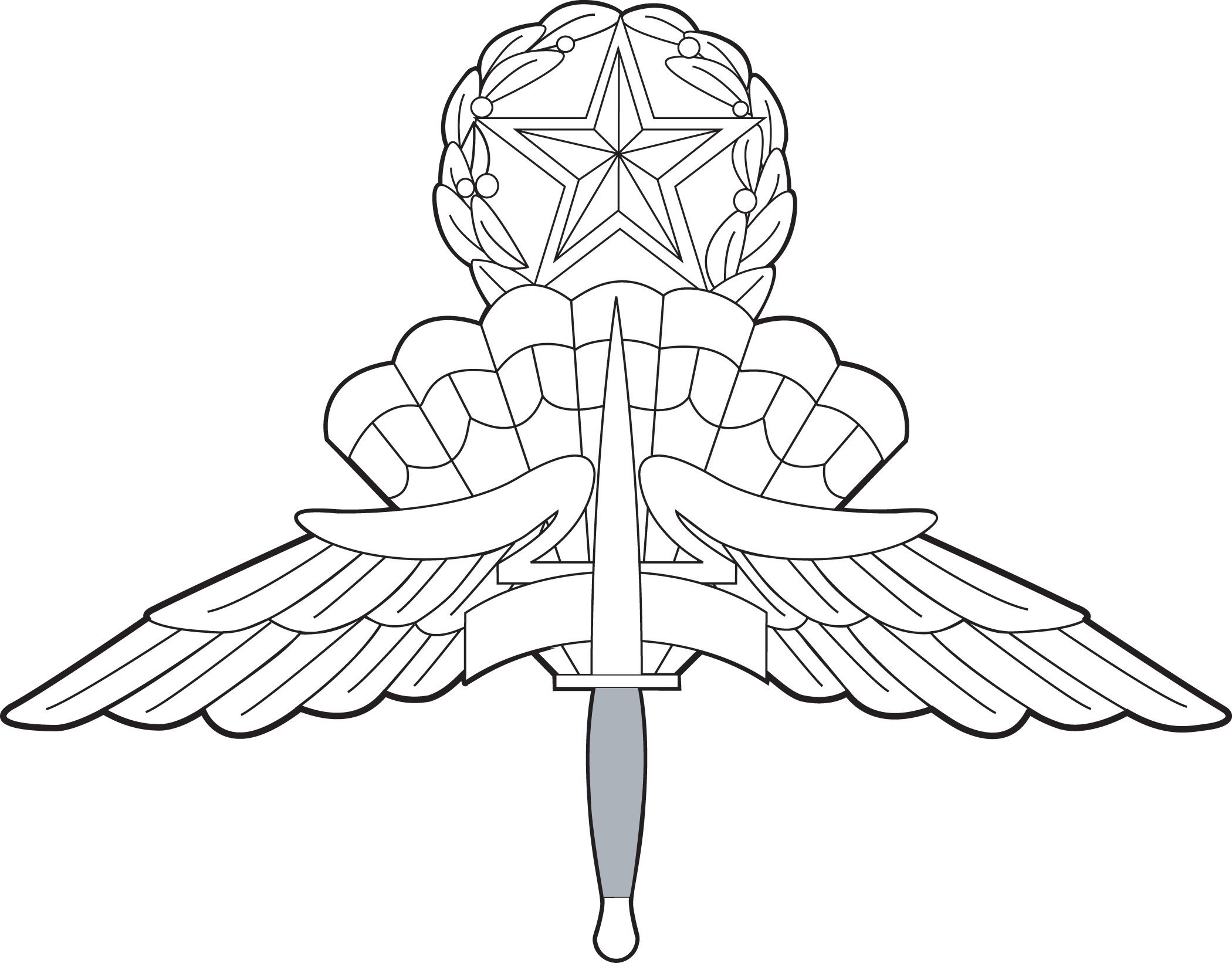
Master Military Freefall Parachutist Badge

Navy and Marine Corps Parachutist Insignia

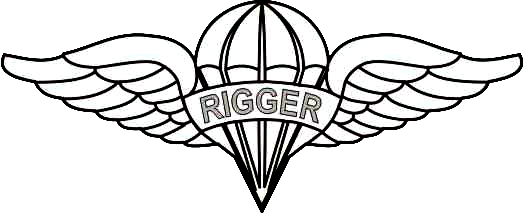
Parachute Rigger Badge

== Argentina ==
In the Argentinian Army, personnel who complete the basic parachutist training receive a badge consisting of a silver winged parachute. A golden badge is awarded to personnel after fulfilling certain requirements, including a number of years spent in a parachute unit, a number of jumps and completion of at least two more parachute-related courses besides the basic one, such as rigger, jumpmaster, free-fall jump, etc. This system replaced the one existing until 1993 when, despite parachute experience, officers wore a golden badge, NCOs a silver one and privates a smaller silver one. Navy, Air Force and Gendarmerie parachutists were similar badges to those of the Army.

== Czechoslovakia ==
Czechoslovak badges were awarded in three classes:

3rd Class
2nd Class
1st Class

== Canada ==
Canadian Jump Wings

Canadian Paratroopers with Canadian Jump Wings date back to the days of the 1st Special Service Force and 1st Canadian Parachute Battalion of World War II. In 1942 Canada had its own distinctive wings, worn on the left breast above service ribbons. This style was awarded until 1968 when the current wings were introduced. There are two classes of Canadian Jump Wings, red maple leaf for completion of the Basic Parachutist's Course, and white maple leaf for completing the basic course, and sufficient months of service in a designated parachutist's position. The Canadian Airborne Regiment (April 1968 to March 1995) were the most well known wearers of the Canadian Jump Wings. After its disbandment in 1995, the Canadian army's parachute traditions reverted to the pre-1968 practice of maintaining a parachute company within one of the battalions of each of the regular infantry regiments. Many of the Airborne Regiment's soldiers, returned to their regimental "homes" and stood up companies in the light battalion of each of their regiments (the 3rd Battalion The Royal Canadian Regiment, the 3rd Battalion Princess Patricia's Canadian Light Infantry and the 3rd Battalion Royal 22^{e} Régiment). These soldiers, and jump-qualified members of the Queen’s Own Rifles of Canada, are entitled to wear the white leaf jump wings. Foreign service members and all other graduates who complete the Canadian basic parachutist course will receive the red leaf jump wings.

== Other countries ==
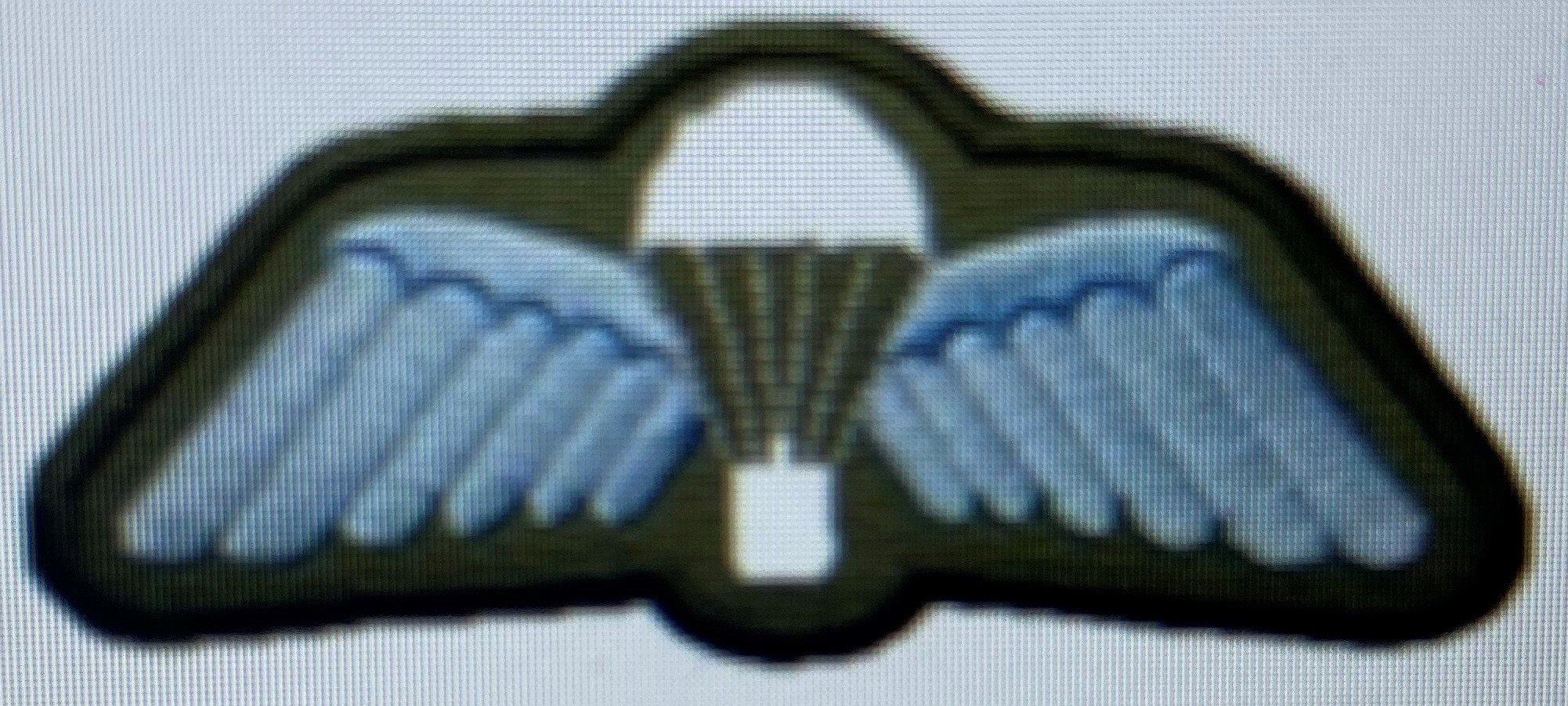
Australia

Bangladesh

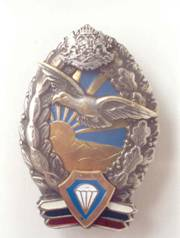
Bulgaria

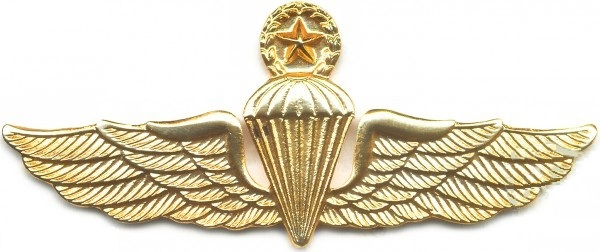
Colombia

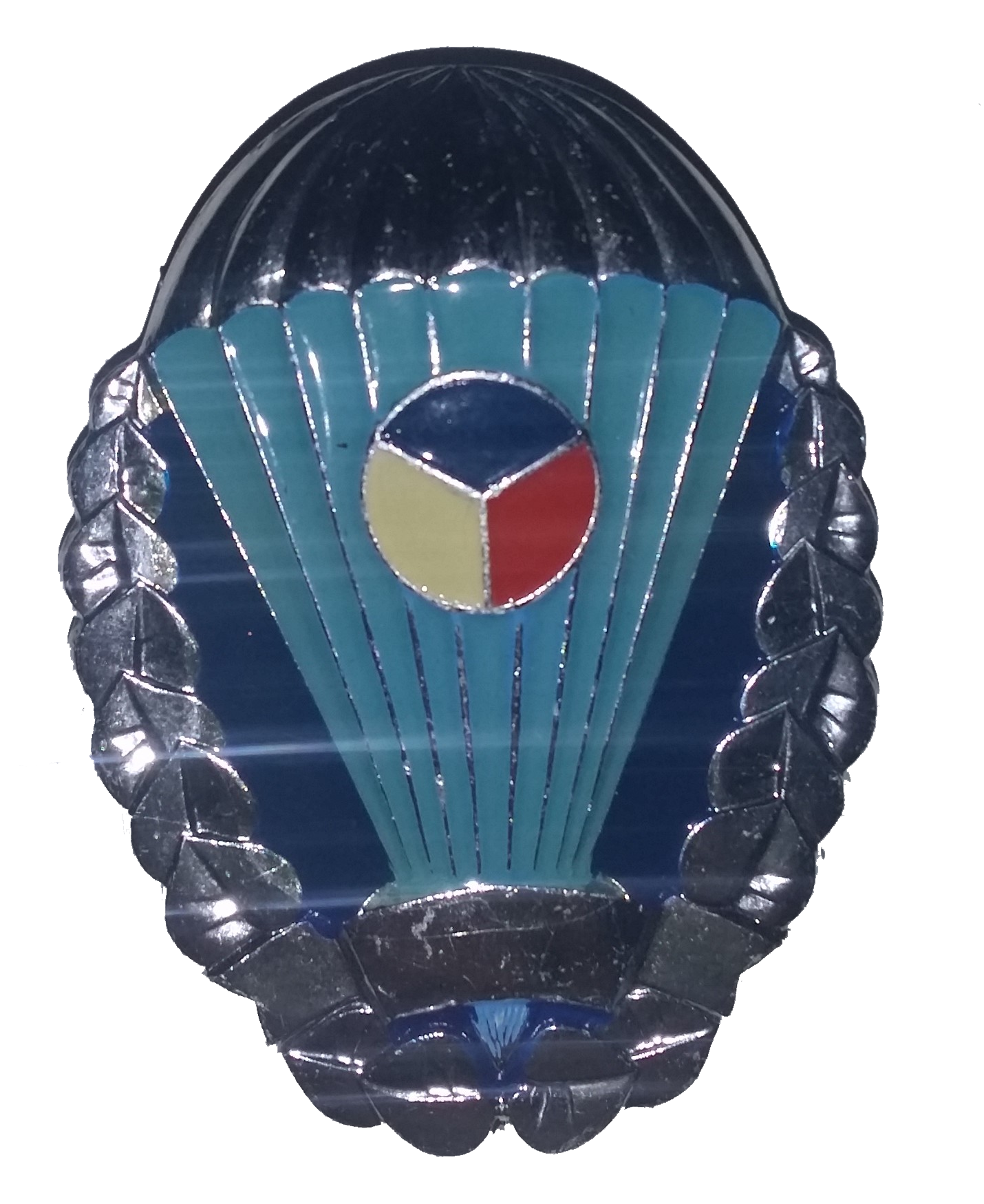
Czech Republic

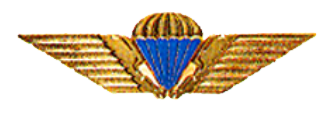
Denmark

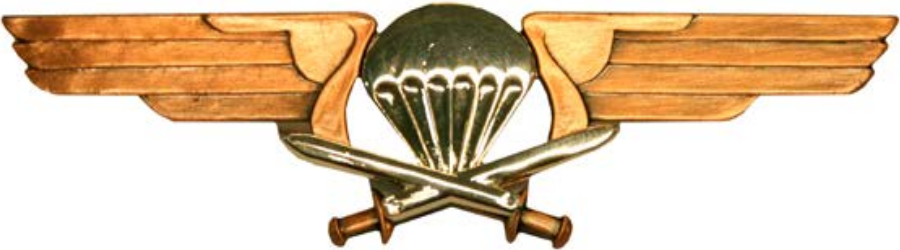
Finland

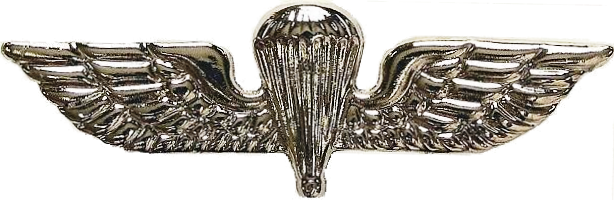
Greek Army

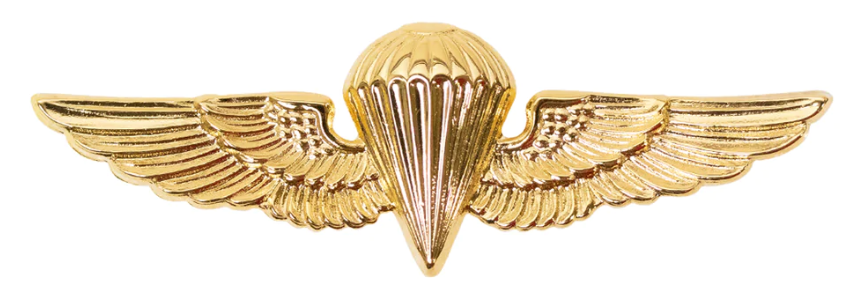
Honduras

Hungary

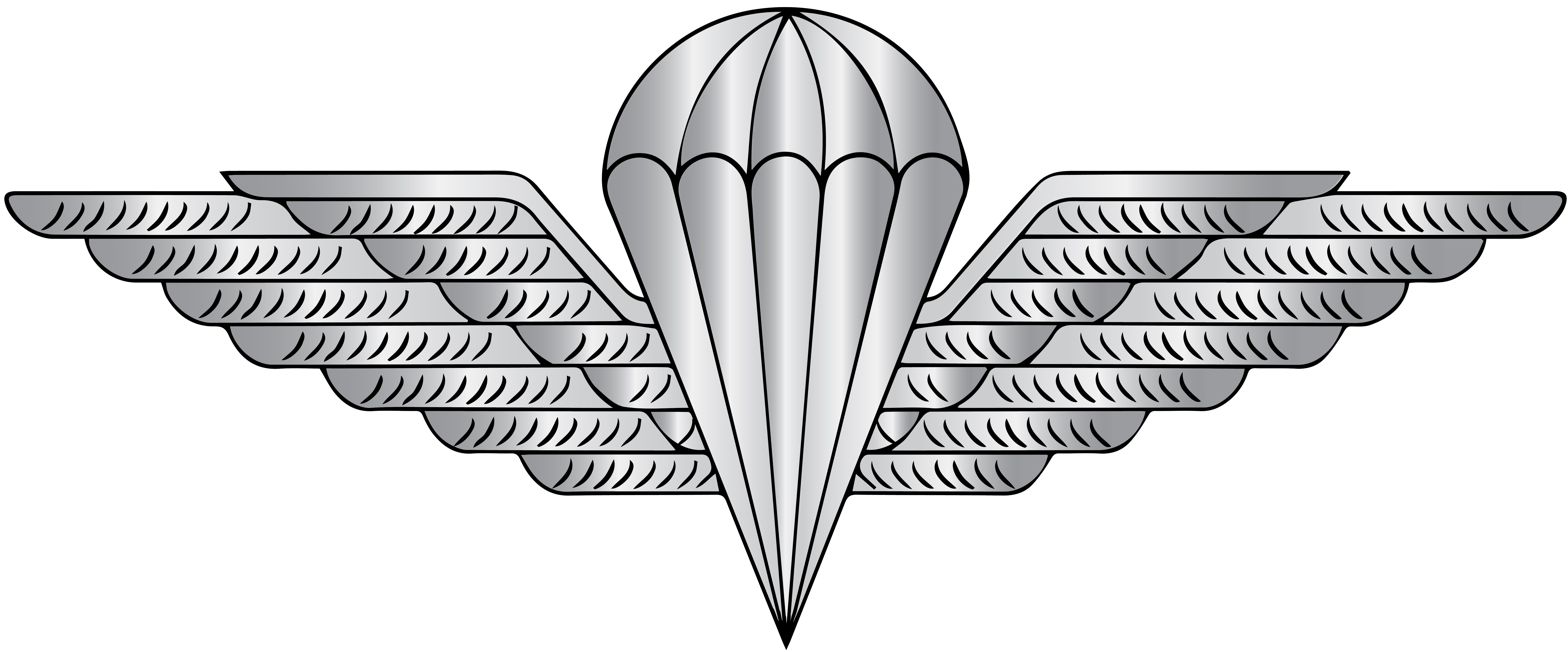
Ireland

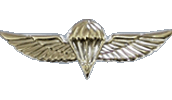
Israel

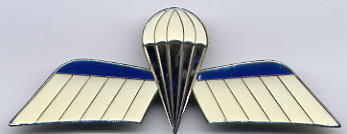
Netherlands

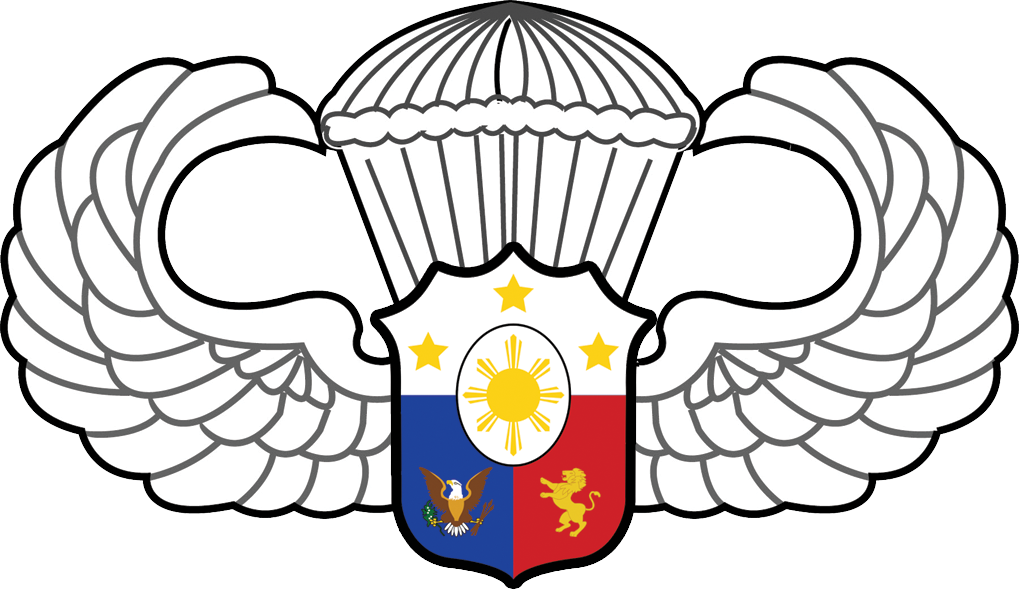
Philippines

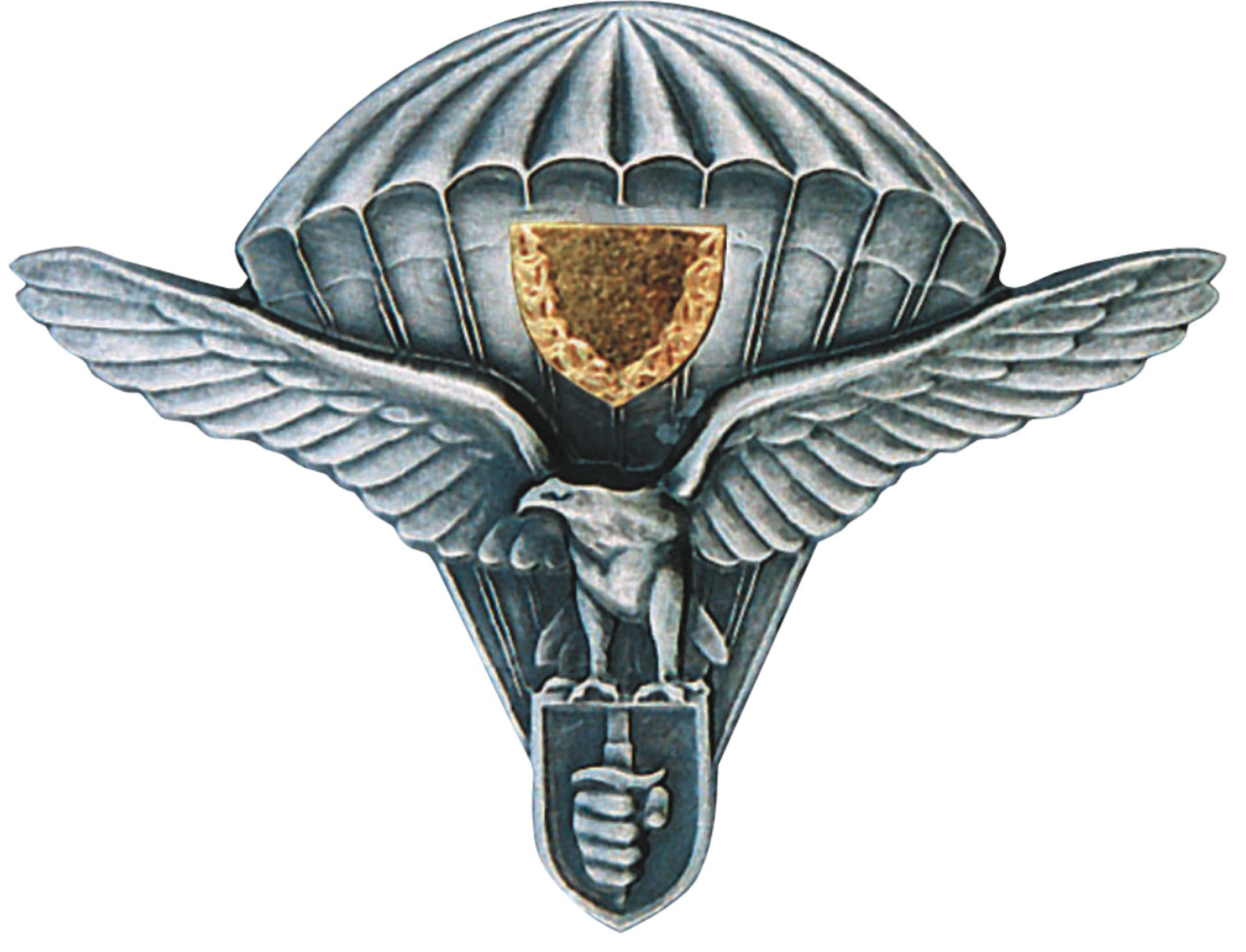
Slovakia

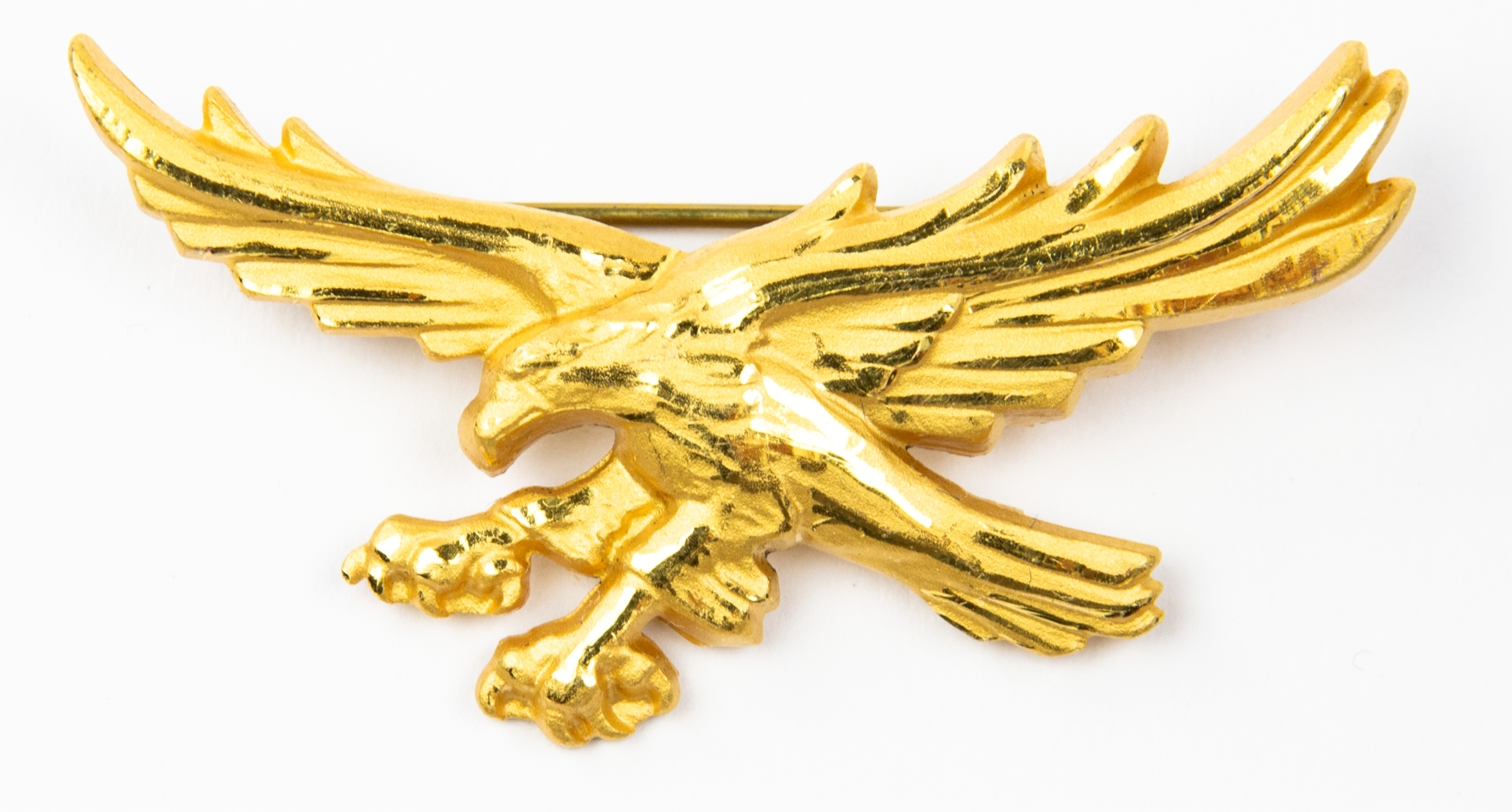
Sweden

UK

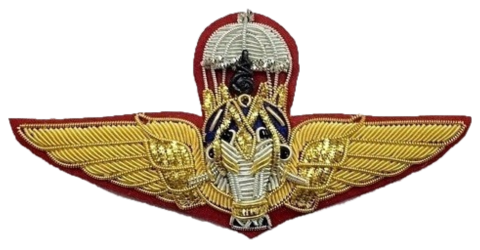
Thailand (Royal Thai Army)

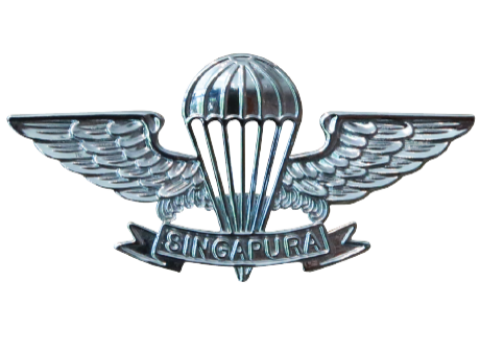
Singapore

=== Former countries ===
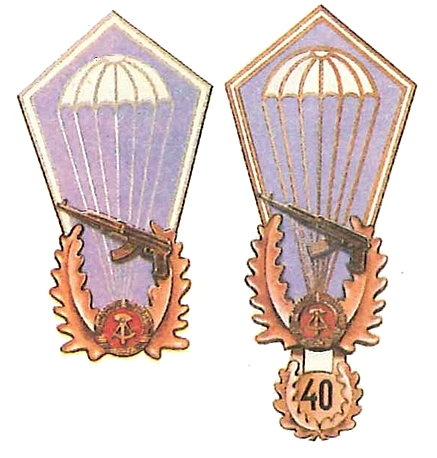
East Germany

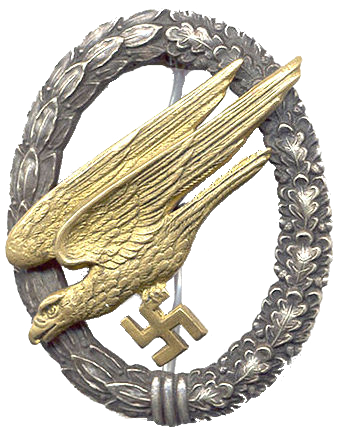
Nazi Germany

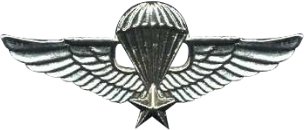
South Vietnam

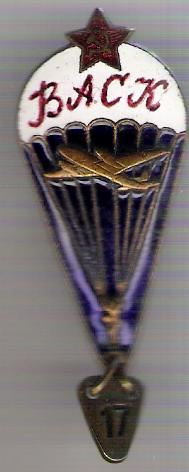
Soviet Union
