= Tank Memorial Badge =

Tank Memorial Badge Kampfwagen-Erinnerungsabzeichen
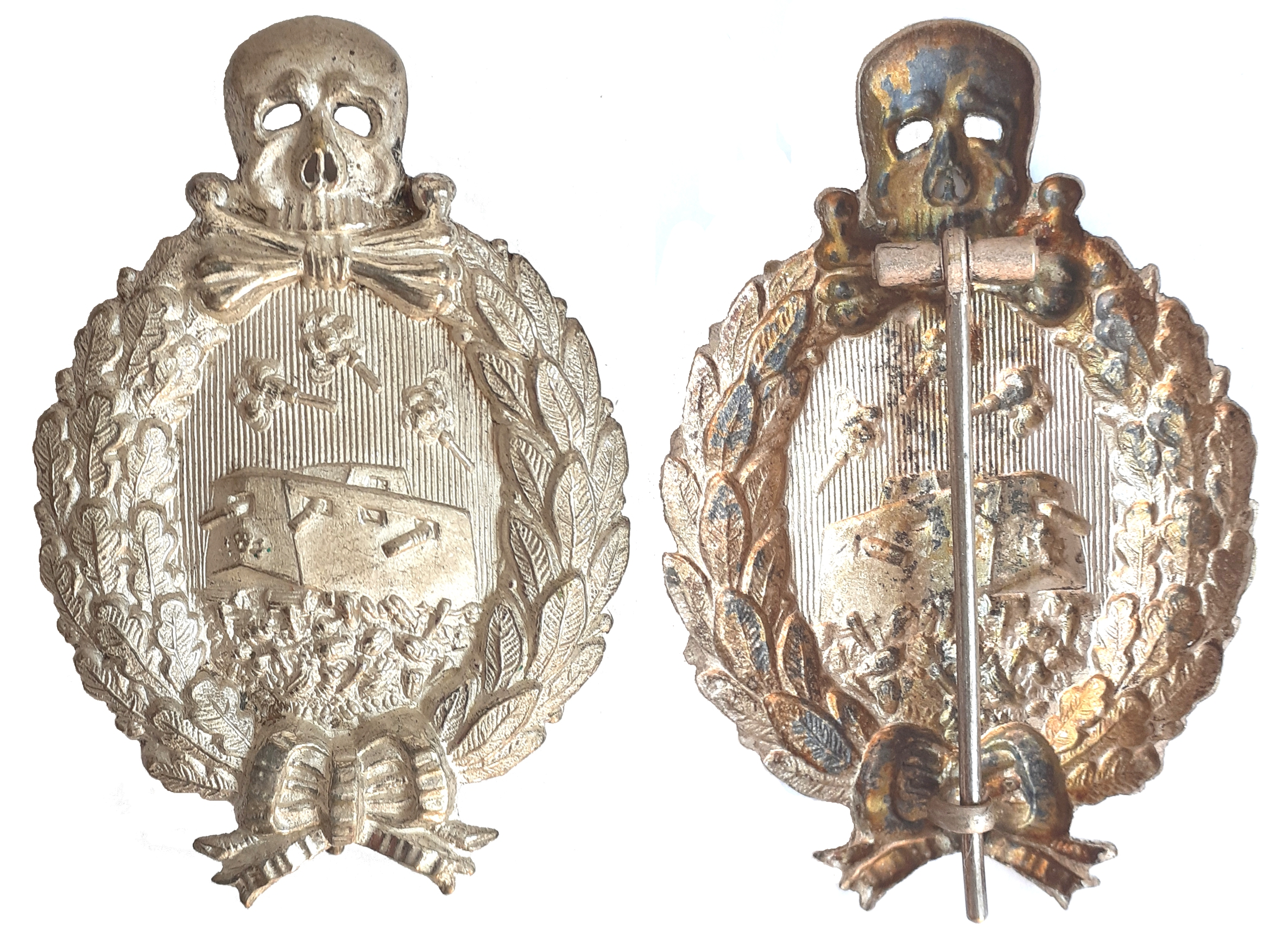
- Awarded for: recognizing the achievements of tank personnel who took part in armoured assaults
- Country: Weimar Republic
- Presented by: the Ministry of the Reichswehr
- Eligibility: Military personnel
- Campaign: World War I
- Status: Obsolete
- Established: 13 July 1921

Highlights
- Total: 99 (official) unknown number of non-certificate awards
- Related: Panzer Badge of the Condor Legion; Panzer Badge (World War II)

The Tank Memorial Badge (German: Kampfwagen-Erinnerungsabzeichen) was a military decoration of the Weimar Republic awarded to former tank crewmen who fought in World War I.

Officially known as Memorial Badge for former German tank crews (German: Erinnerungsabzeichen für die ehemaligen Besatzungen deutscher Kampfwagen) it was usually referred to as Tank Memorial Badge or simply Tank Badge (Kampfwagenabzeichen). Draft cards of this era show that it was sometimes written as Tank-Abzeichen.

== History and criteria ==
The Tank Badge was instituted by the Minister of Defence Otto Gessler on 13 Jul 1921 and laid down in the Heeres-Verordnungsblatt Nr. 41 of 15 July 1921. It was to be issued to veterans of World War I who qualified by: being a crewman (commander, driver, gunner, loader, mechanic, signaller or messenger) of a tank; either an A7V or a Beutepanzer (captured tank), and either participated in three armored assaults or being wounded during an armored assault.

Potential recipients had to apply to the Inspectorate of Motorized Troops to receive a certificate; the actual badge had to be obtained privately. Because of this unusual method of application the badge was officially certified in only 99 cases.

== Design ==
The silver oval-formed badge featured a Totenkopf (skull and crossbones) on the top in reference to the Brunswick skull. It was enclosed by a two-part wreath, oak leaves on the left and laurel leaves on the right; both tied with a bow at the bottom. The central piece was a stylized A7V tank crossing a barbed wire entanglement from east to west with three bursting shrapnels above it. It was to be worn as a stick-on decoration below the left breast pocket.

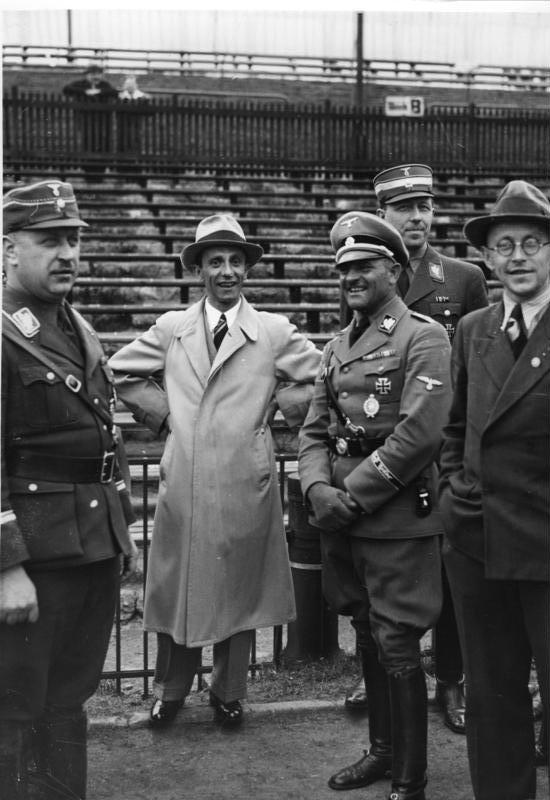
1936 photograph showing Sepp Dietrich standing 3rd from right wearing the Tank Memorial badge

== See also ==
- Tanks in World War I

== Resources ==
- Higgins, David E. (2013). Mark IV vs A7V: Villers-Bretonneux 1918. Oxford, UK.: Osprey Publishing. ISBN 978-1-7809-6005-0.
- Haupt, Werner (1990). A History of the Panzer Troops, 1916-1945. Lancaster, UK.: Gazelle Book Services. ISBN 0-8874-0244-5.
- Künker Auktion 253 - Orden und Ehrenzeichen I 10. Ordensauktion des Hauses Künker. Osnabrück, Germany. 2012.
- Heeres-Verordnungsblatt. 3. Jahrgang, Berlin den 15. Juli 1921, Nr. 41. pp. 299–300.
