= Army Mountain Guide Badge (Germany) =

German army proficiency badge

Army Mountain Guide Badge Abzeichen für Heeresbergführer
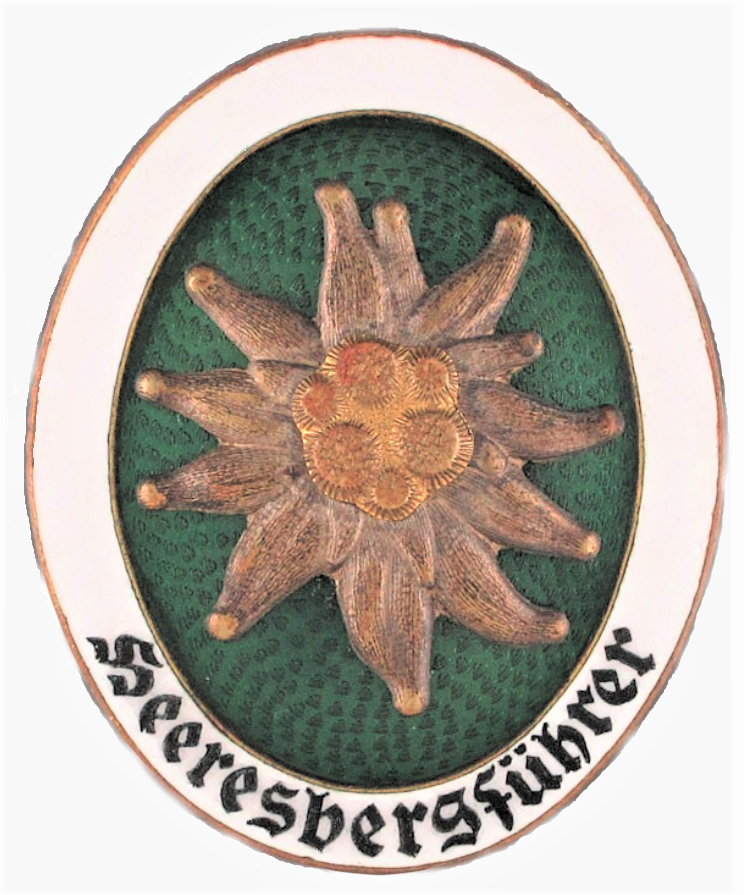
- Wehrmacht badge awarded 1936–45
- Type: Proficiency badge
- Presented by: Nazi Germany; Federal Republic of Germany
- Eligibility: Experienced Army mountain guides
- Established: 10 August 1936
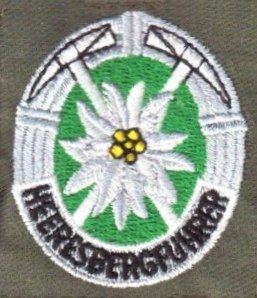
- Bundeswehr version

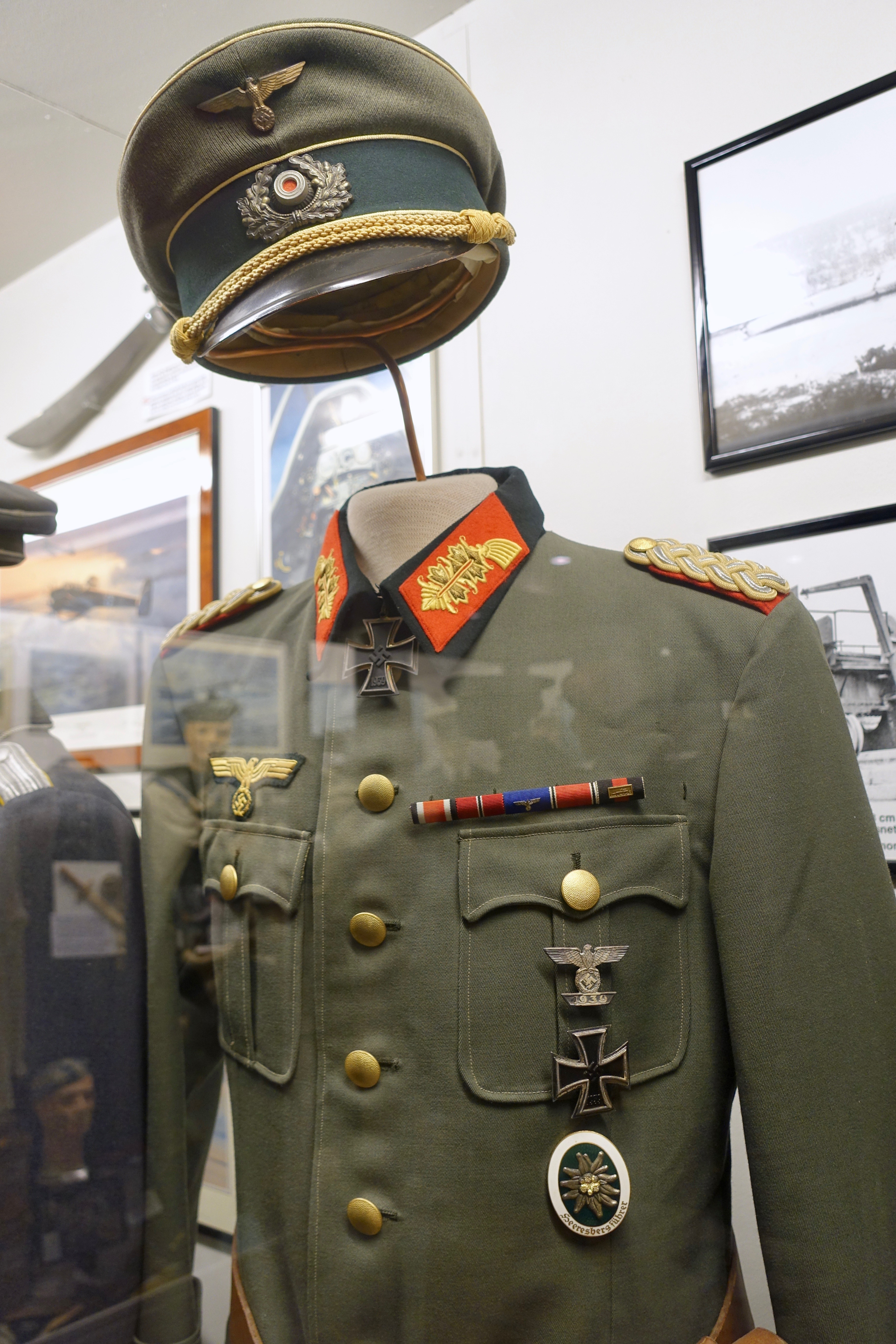
Badge on General's tunic. Senior officers sometimes received honorary awards

The Army Mountain Guide Badge (German: Abzeichen für Heeresbergführer) was a German military badge awarded to experienced Gebirgsjager mountain guides in Nazi Germany.

An Army Mountain Guide Badge of a different design is also awarded by the current Federal Republic of Germany.

== Eligibility and appearance ==
The Army Mountain Guide Badge was established in August 1936. It was worn by Gebirgsjäger troops in the German Wehrmacht who had trained as mountain guides and then acted as a guide for one year. The badge was not awarded after 1945.

It was an oval tombac-plated iron pin-back badge, measuring 51.8 mm by 42.9 mm. The centre has an edelweiss flower in silver with a gilt centre, on a green enamel background. A surrounding white enamel band bears, on its lower portion, the word 'Heeresbergführer' in gothic script. The reverse is plain except for the pin fastening and, in most cases, the name of the manufacturer. In uniform, it was worn on or below the left-hand breast pocket, although it was sometimes seen worn on the right side of the jacket.

A badge of a different design was awarded in Nazi Germany to police mountain guides.

== Bundeswehr version ==
Gebirgsjäger troops of the current German Bundeswehr who qualify as mountain guides receive an army mountain guide badge, to be worn in the middle of the right breast pocket. The badge is worn while the holder serves as a guide or on other mountaineering duties, with eligibility ceasing for those not so involved for two years. After twelve years the badge can be worn in uniform permanently, irrespective of the work undertaken.

A machine embroidered oval cloth badge, it displays an edelweiss in front of two crossed ice axes, on a green background. Surrounding this is a grey wreath with the wording 'HEERESBERGFÜHRER' on its lower portion.

== See also ==
- Orders, decorations, and medals of Nazi Germany
- Gebirgsjäger
