= Anti-Aircraft Flak Battle Badge =

Anti-Aircraft Flak Battle Badge Flak-Kampfabzeichen der Luftwaffe
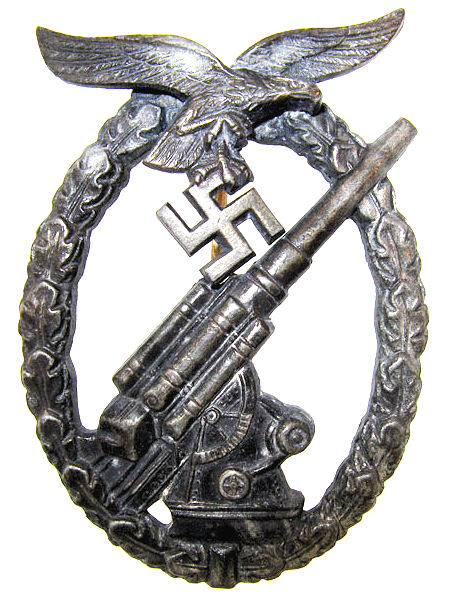
- Type: Badge
- Presented by: Nazi Germany
- Eligibility: Military personnel
- Campaign(s): World War II
- Established: 10 January 1941

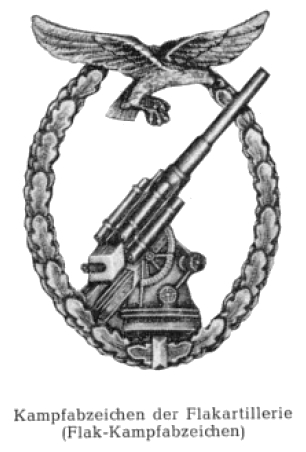
1957 version

Anti-Aircraft Flak Battle Badge (German: Flak-Kampfabzeichen der Luftwaffe) was a World War II military decoration of Nazi Germany. It was instituted on 10 January 1941 by Hermann Göring in his capacity as the Commander in Chief of the Luftwaffe. The badge was awarded to servicemen of the Flak artillery who distinguished themselves in action against enemy aerial or ground attacks.

Designed by Wilhelm Ernst Peekhaus, the badge was of single piece construction with a pin back and clasp. It was made in one grade; it had a Luftwaffe eagle at the top, and an oak leaf wreath around the outside rim. In the middle was an 88 mm flak gun with the barrel facing upwards to the right. The badge was worn on the lower part of the left breast pocket of the service tunic, underneath the 1st class Iron Cross if awarded.

== Criteria ==
It was awarded after the accumulation of 16 points or could also be awarded outside of the points system for an act of merit or bravery in the performance of air defense duties. If the candidates' battery brought down an enemy aircraft then the crew members were awarded four points. If two batteries were involved then each battery received two points. Both officers and crews were eligible for the badge. The commanding officer for an anti-aircraft unit was eligible for the badge once half of his men also qualified for the badge. The award was also available to searchlight crews and sound-locator crews. Searchlight and sound-locator crews which assisted in the action by detection of aircraft could be awarded one point each. The German Army had a similar badge, however, earning points towards it were only awarded for the downing of aircraft and not for ground targets. Prior to the introduction of the Ground Assault Badge of the Luftwaffe, this badge could be awarded to a serviceman for the participation in three separate combat operations against tanks, bunkers or ships.
