= Parachutist Badge (Nazi Germany) =

Nazi Luftwaffe badge

Fallschirmschützenabzeichen
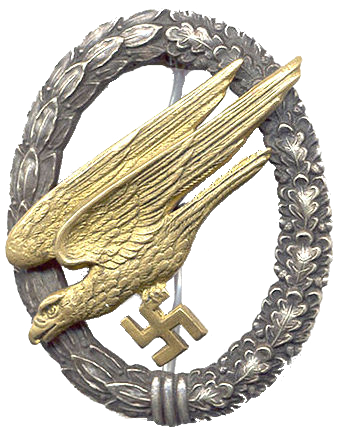
- Type: Parachutist Badge
- Awarded for: Parachutist proficiency
- Description: Qualification badge
- Presented by: Nazi Germany
- Eligibility: Wehrmacht & Waffen-SS
- Campaign: World War II
- Status: No longer awarded
- Established: 5 November 1936

The Parachutist Badge (Fallschirmschützenabzeichen) was a badge awarded to qualified parachutists of the Wehrmacht and the Waffen-SS of Nazi Germany.

The badge was first established by order of Hermann Göring on 5 November 1936. It was originally awarded to Luftwaffe personnel after completion of the required number of six jumps. The badge depicted a diving eagle with a swastika in its claws surrounded by a silver wreath. The original construction was made of "gold-finished bronze" for the eagle and "oxidized silver plate" for the laurel leaves. In 1937, the construction of the badge changed to aluminium. In late 1942, the construction was changed again to a metal alloy. A cloth version of the badge was also authorized in 1937, to be worn on a flight jacket. A recipient had to re-qualify for the badge each year.

An army version (Fallschirmschützen-Abzeichen des Heeres) was later introduced (1 September 1937), with the swastika relocated to the top of the wreath and surmounted by a smaller upright eagle. As with the Luftwaffe, a recipient had to re-qualify for the badge each year. In 1936, the army ordered the institution of its own parachute company, which was expanded to a battalion in 1938. When the army parachute units were transferred over to the Luftwaffe in 1939, the former army soldiers continued to wear the army version of the Parachutist badge. The Waffen-SS personnel of the 500, 501 or 502 SS-Parachute Battalions were awarded the Luftwaffe badge after they passed the jump and other test requirements.

== Versions ==
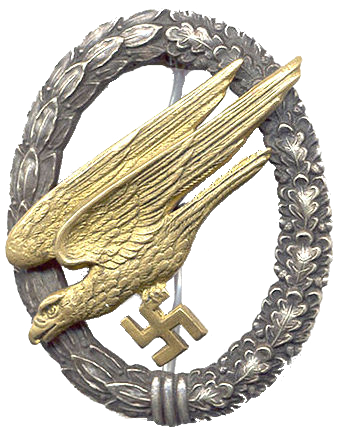
Air force version

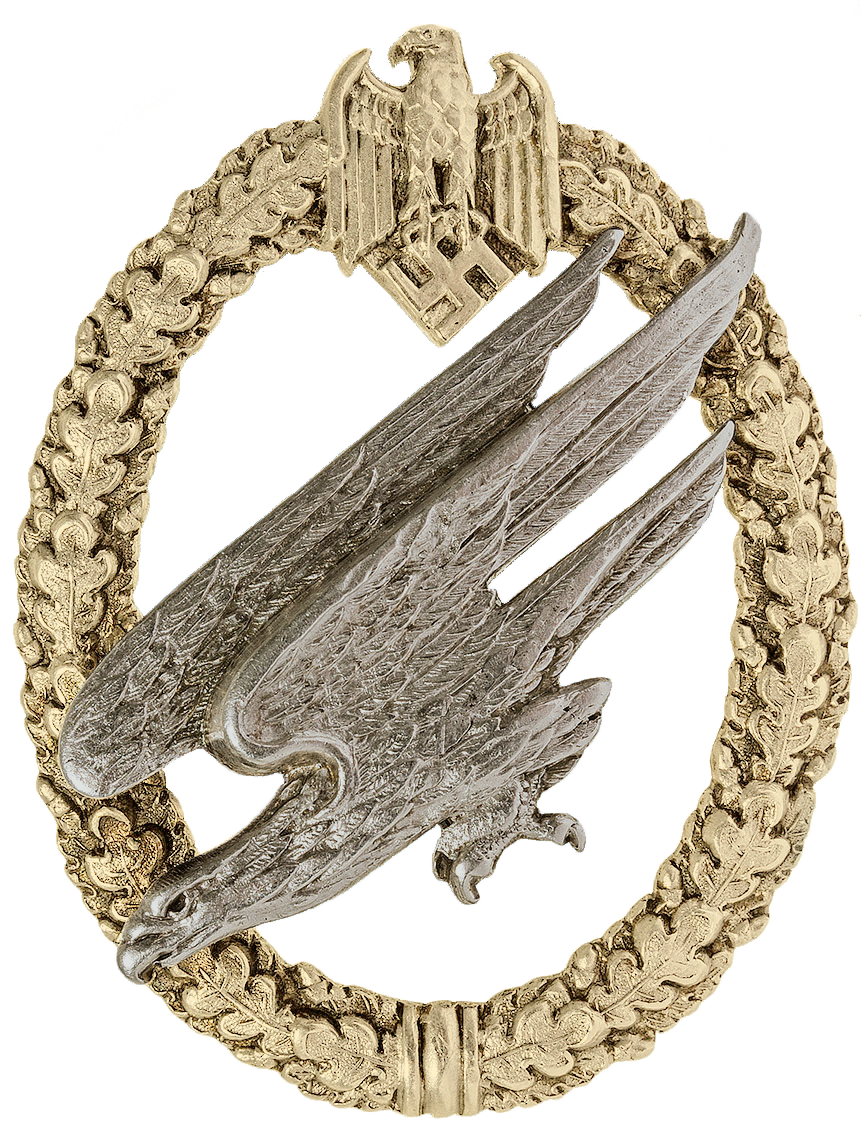
Army version

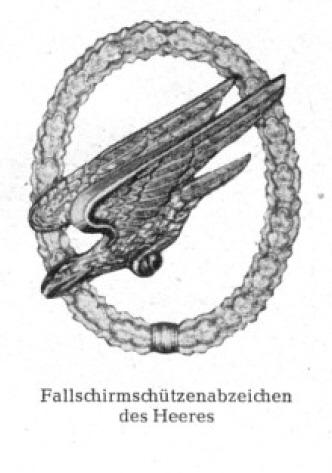
1957 de-nazified Army version
