= War Merit Medal =

War Merit Medal Kriegsverdienstmedaille
- War Merit Medal
- Awarded for: contributing to the German war effort
- Presented by: Nazi Germany
- Eligibility: Civilians
- Status: Discontinued for foreigners after 15 May 1943; Obsolete
- Established: 19 August 1940

Highlights
- Total: 4.9 million (est)
- Ribbon

Precedence
- Equivalent: Medal of Merit of the Order of the German Eagle
- Related: War Merit Cross

The War Merit Medal (Kriegsverdienstmedaille) was a World War II German military decoration awarded to recognize outstanding service by civilians in relation to the war effort. It was instituted on 19 August 1940 and usually awarded to those workers in factories who significantly exceeded work quotas. The War Merit Medal was awarded only to German and non-German civilians, and to men and women. An estimated 4.9 million medals were awarded by the end of the war in Europe. It was closely related to the War Merit Cross, which could be awarded to military personnel and civilians alike for outstanding service to the war effort.

== Design ==
The medal was designed by Professor Richard Klein of Munich. It was a circular bronze award bearing the design of the War Merit Cross on the front (obverse), and the inscription "For War Merit 1939" (Für Kriegsverdienst) on the reverse side. It was suspended from a ribbon coloured similar to the War Merit Cross, except for a thin red vertical strip added to the center of the black portion. When worn, it was either as a medal ribbon bar above the left breast pocket (soldiers who had earned the medal as civilians could wear it on their uniform), or with the ribbon only through the second buttonhole of a jacket. Since this was a non-combat award, the medal never incorporated swords. After 15 May 1943, the award of this medal to foreigners was superseded by the Medal of Merit of the Order of the German Eagle.

The medal was presented in an envelope wrapper. The wrapper was blue with black lettering of Kriegs-Verdienstmedaille 1939 across the front. The medal itself was then wrapped in a piece of tissue paper.
