= Army Anti-Aircraft Badge =

German military decoration

Army Anti-Aircraft Badge Heeres-Flak Abzeichen
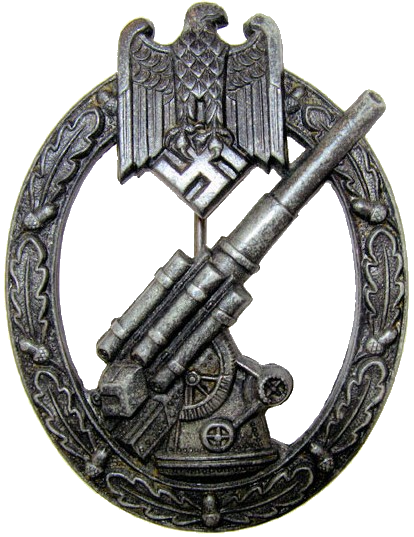
- Type: Badge
- Presented by: Nazi Germany
- Eligibility: Military personnel
- Campaign: World War II
- Status: Obsolete
- Established: 18 July 1941

The Army Anti-Aircraft Badge or Army Flak Badge (German: Heeres-Flak-Abzeichen) was a German military decoration awarded to German Army personnel for service in an anti-aircraft battery during World War II. Designed by Wilhelm Ernst Peekhaus, it was of single piece construction. The pin back and clasp badge was grey metal in color. The badge was made in one grade; it had the national eagle at the top and an oak leaf wreath around the outside rim. In the middle was an 88 mm flak gun with the barrel facing upwards to the "viewer's" right.

== Criteria ==
Criteria for the award came from a recommendation by commanders of the rank of General der Artillerie or above. It was awarded after the accumulation of 16 points or could also be awarded outside of the points system for an act of merit or bravery in the performance of anti-aircraft duties. If the candidates' battery brought down an enemy aircraft then the crew members were awarded four points. If two batteries were involved then each battery received two points. Both officers and crews were eligible for the badge. The commanding officer for an anti-aircraft unit was eligible for the badge once half of his men also qualified for the badge. Unlike the similar German Air Force Anti-Aircraft Flak Battle Badge (Flak-Kampfabzeichen der Luftwaffe), points were only awarded for the downing of aircraft and not ground targets. The award was also available to searchlight crews and sound-locator crews. German Army searchlight crews and sound-locator crews which assisted in the action by detection of aircraft could be awarded one point each.
