= Panzer Badge =

Panzer Badge Panzerkampfabzeichen
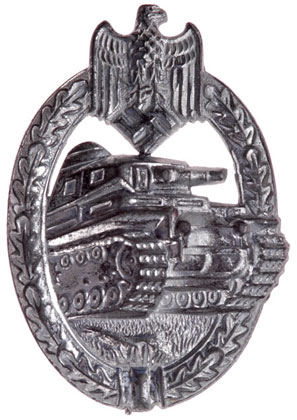
- Type: Badge
- Awarded for: Armoured warfare
- Presented by: Nazi Germany
- Eligibility: Military personnel
- Campaign: World War II
- Status: Obsolete
- Established: 20 December 1939

The Panzer Badge (German: Panzerkampfabzeichen) was a World War II military decoration of Nazi Germany awarded to troops in armoured divisions. Before 1 June 1940 it was known as the Panzerkampfwagenabzeichen.

== Creation and eligibility ==
Introduced on 20 December 1939, the Panzer Badge was authorized for award to tank crews who had actively participated in three armoured assaults on different days. On 1 June 1940, a bronze version was created for panzer grenadier units equipped with armoured vehicles, as well as other infantry, armoured reconnaissance, armoured signals, and medical units serving with Panzer divisions. From 31 December 1942, armoured unit repair teams could receive the silver badge for repairing tanks in combat conditions on three different days.

In June 1943, additional Tank Badges were instituted in both silver and bronze to reward participation in 25, 50, 75, and 100 armoured actions. The number of engagements required for these higher-level badges could be reduced for those with long, continuous frontline service or who had received disabling wounds. Only one badge, the highest level received, could be worn.

The authorization of these badges was usually done at regimental or divisional level.

== Design and wear ==
The badge is oval and features a three-quarters front view of a Panzer IV tank, surrounded by an oak wreath and surmounted by the Wehrmacht eagle and swastika. The badge for tank crews is silver, with a bronze finish for other eligible combatants serving with armoured divisions. The badge, measuring 42mm by 61mm, has a brooch pin and was worn on the left side of the tunic.

The versions for 25 and more engagements are broadly of the same design, but are slightly larger with a small plaque at the base of the wreath bearing the number of actions rewarded. While still issued in silver and bronze, the 25 and 50 silver versions show the tank with a black finish, with both the silver and bronze 75 and 100 badges having a gilded wreath. The 75 and 100 badges are wider, measuring 51mm by 60mm, and were struck in a lightweight zinc alloy; ensuring that the larger pin did not pull inconveniently on the tunic.

=== 1957 version ===
After an initial ban, the Federal Republic of Germany re-authorized the wear of many World War II military decorations in 1957, including the Panzer Badge. Members of the Bundeswehr could wear the badge, redesigned to remove the eagle and swastika, on the ribbon bar, which was represented by a small replica of the award on a field-grey ribbon.

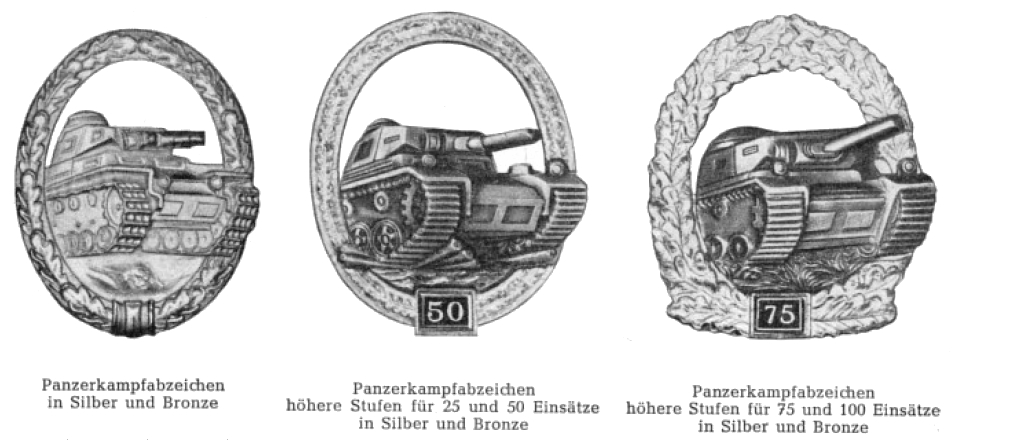
The 1957 denazified variants

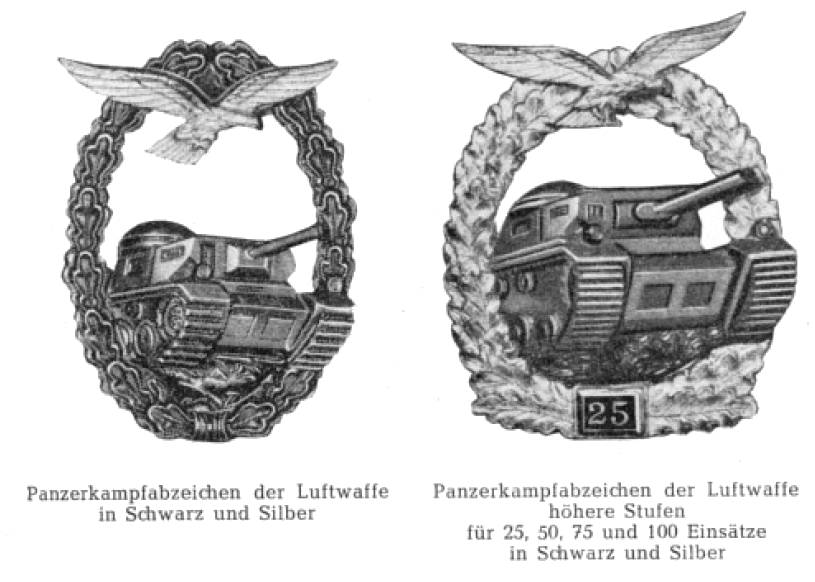
The 1957 denazified Luftwaffe variants

== Luftwaffe version ==
Luftwaffe ground troops were eligible for the Tank Badge from its creation. In November 1944, a special Luftwaffe version was approved, with the same award criteria as the existing badge, including the special awards for 25, 50, 75 and 100 engagements. The design followed the earlier badge, but with the Luftwaffe eagle and swastika replacing the folded-wing Wehrmacht eagle.

Although awards of the new badge were authorized and award certificates issued, there is no evidence that the badge was actually presented before the end of the war. In 1957, a 'de-nazified' version was approved, with the removal of the swastika while retaining the Luftwaffe eagle emblem.

== Sources ==
- Klietmann, Kurt-Gerhard (1981). Auszeichnungen des Deutschen Reiches. 1936–1945, 11 Auflage (in German). Motorbuch, Stuttgart. ISBN 3-87943-689-4.
- Littlejohn, David; Dodkins, Colonel C. M. (1968). Orders, Decorations, Medals and Badges of the Third Reich. R. James Bender Publishing, California. ISBN 978-0854200801.
- Michaelis, Rolf (2008). Deutsche Kriegsauszeichnungen 1939-1945 Heer - Waffen-SS - Polizei (in German). Winkelried Verlag, Leisnig. ISBN 978-3930849314.
- Williamson, Gordon; Pavlović, Darko (2002). World War II German Battle Insignia. Osprey. ISBN 1841763527.
- Windrow, Martin (1982). The Panzer Divisions. Osprey Publishing. ISBN 0-85045-434-4.
