= Aviator badge =

Qualification badge to recognize aviation personnel

An aviator badge is an insignia used in most of the world's militaries to designate those who have received training and qualification in military aviation. Also known as a pilot's badge, or pilot wings, the aviator badge was first conceived to recognize the training that military aviators receive, as well as provide a means to outwardly differentiate between military pilots and the “foot soldiers” of the regular ground forces.

== Austria-Hungary ==
Austro-Hungarian Aviation Troops started wearing gilded silver and enameled badges in 1913. The badges style changed after the death of Franz Joseph I of Austria. In 1917 a new badge was created.

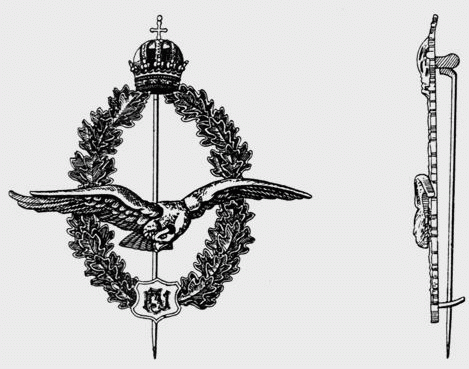
Official publication of the Austrian Government in the K. und K. Normalverordnungsblatt Number 2/1913

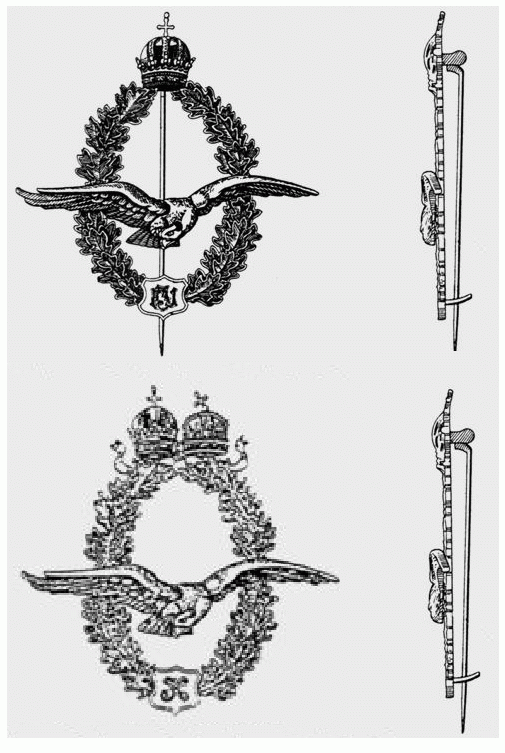
Austro-Hungarian Aviation Troops Badge, 1913 and 1917

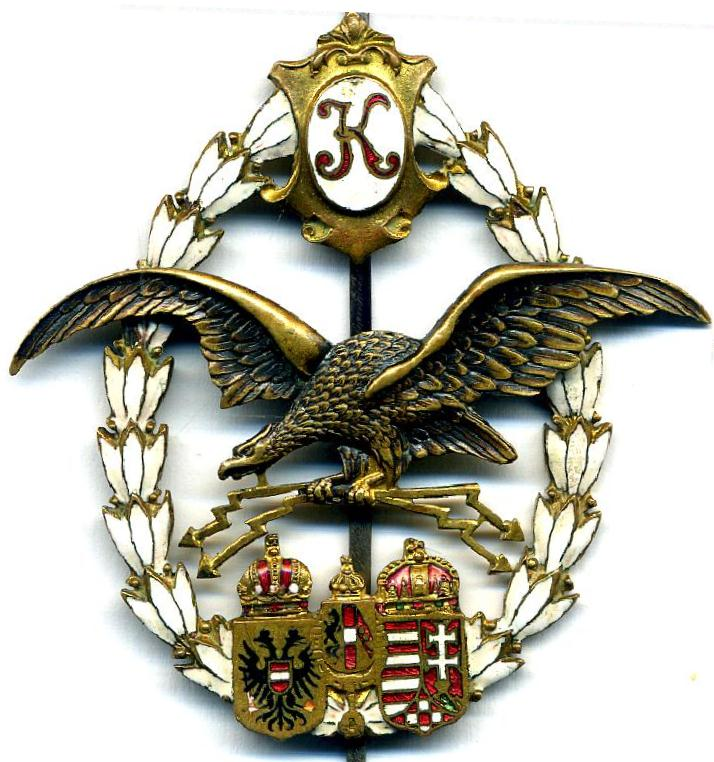
Austro-Hungarian Aviation Troops Observers Badge, 1917

== Belgium ==
Wing/Badge/Brevet of Belgian Air Force Pilot

The current aviator badge of the Belgian Air Force depicting the Leo Belgicus and surmounted the Royal Crown of Belgium.

== Bangladesh ==
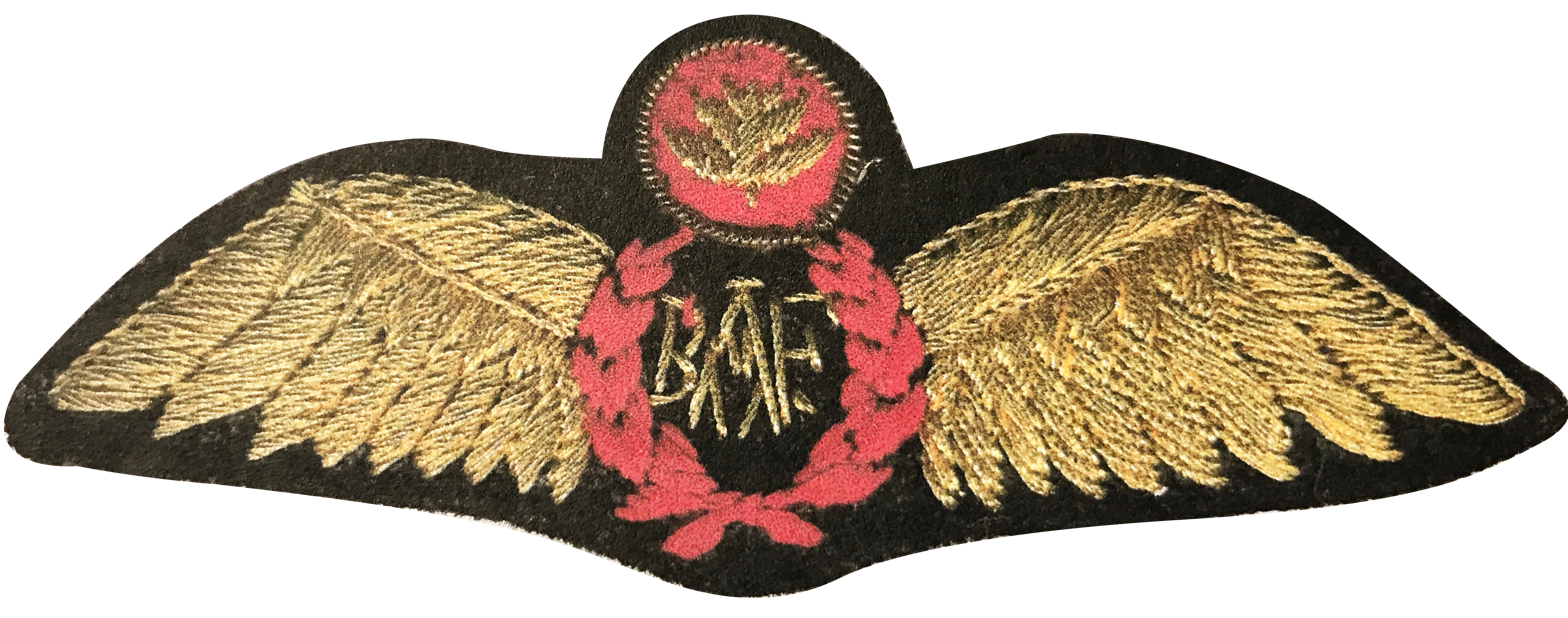
Bangladesh Air Force (BAF) Aviator Badge

Aviator badge of the Bangladesh Air Force

The Aviator Badge of Bangladesh Air Force closely resembles the pilots flying badge of The Royal Air Force. Though the badge has a touch of its own characteristics.

== Canada ==
The Pilot Flying Badge of the Royal Canadian Air Force is:

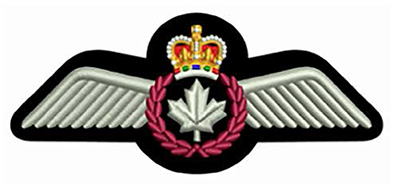
Pilot Flying Badge of the Royal Canadian Air Force

== China ==
The emblem of the People's Liberation Army Air Force is:

Emblem of Chinese People's Liberation Army Air Force since 2007

== Denmark ==
Wing/Badge/Brevet of Royal Danish Air Force Pilot

The aviator badge of the Royal Danish Air Force is based on the national coat of arms of Denmark.

== Iran ==
The Pilot Flying Badge of the Islamic Republic of Iran Air Force is:

Emblem of Islamic Republic of Iran Air Force

== France ==
The aviator badges of the French Air Force/Armée de l'air française and French Navy/Force maritime de l'aéronautique navale are:

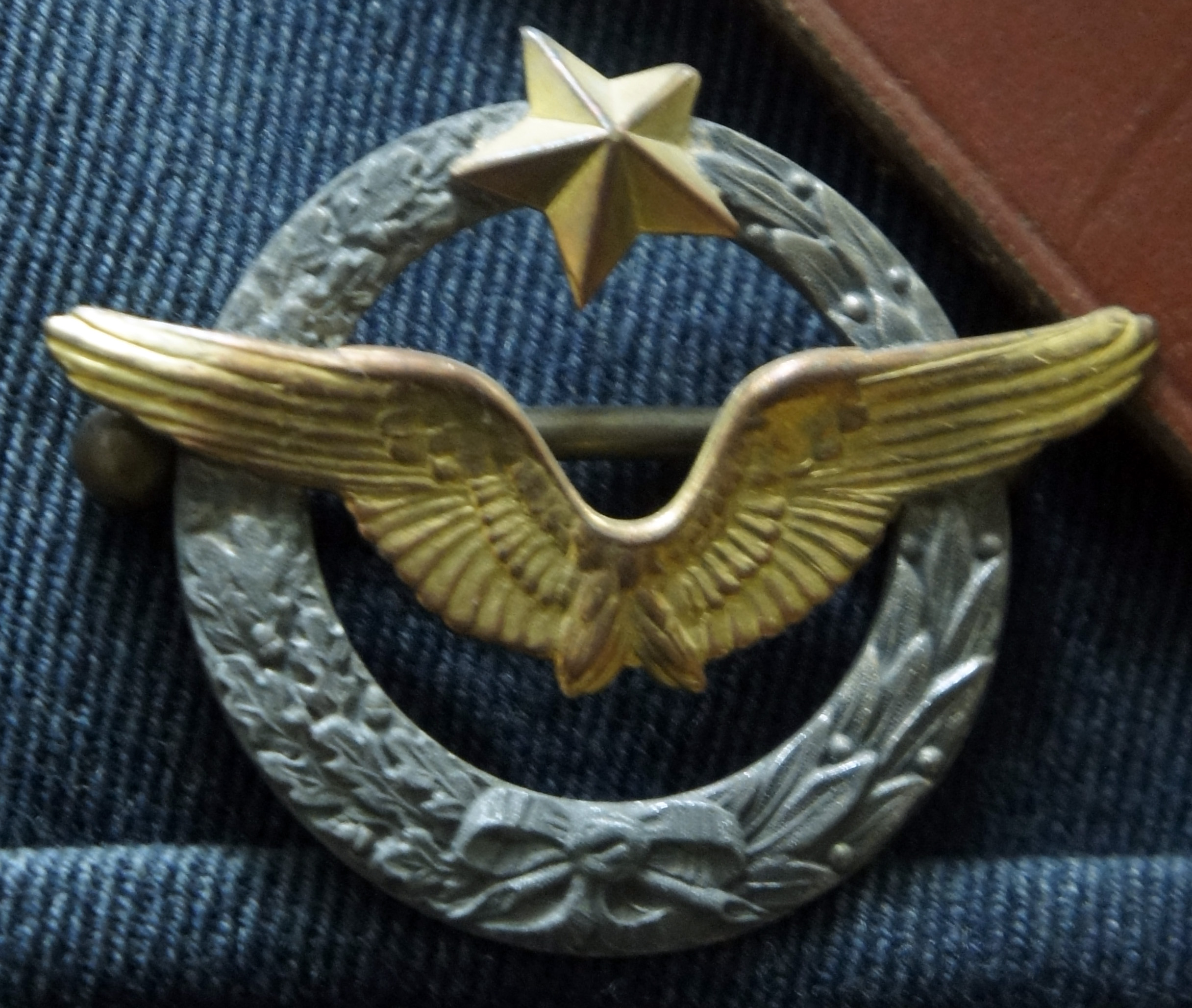
Pilot's Badge

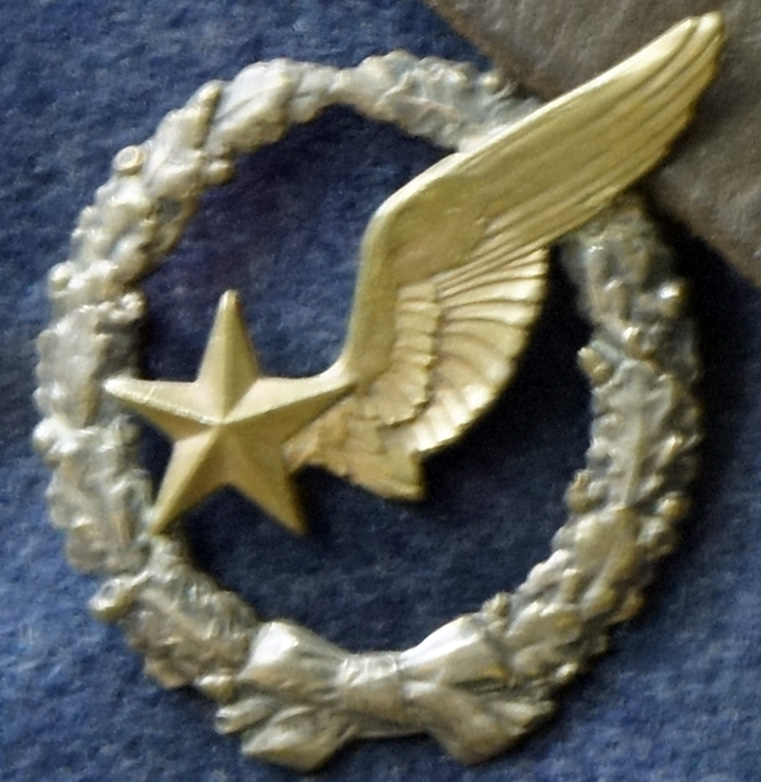
Observer's Badge

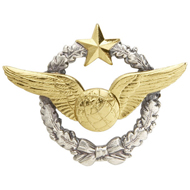
Navigator's Badge

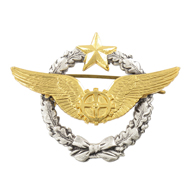
Flight Doctor's Badge

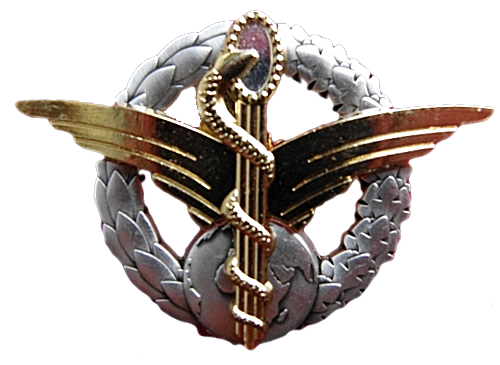
Air Force Flight Nurse

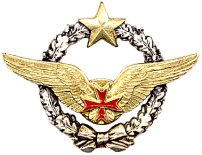
Air Force Patient Pilot

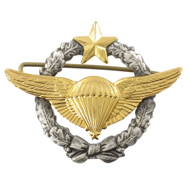
Parachutist Badge

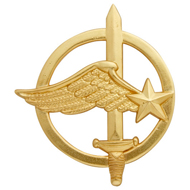
Air Force Commando's Badge
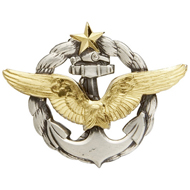
Naval Pilot's Badge

== Germany ==
=== 1913-1920 ===
Several badges were donated to German aircrew prior, during or after the First World War. The most notable were:

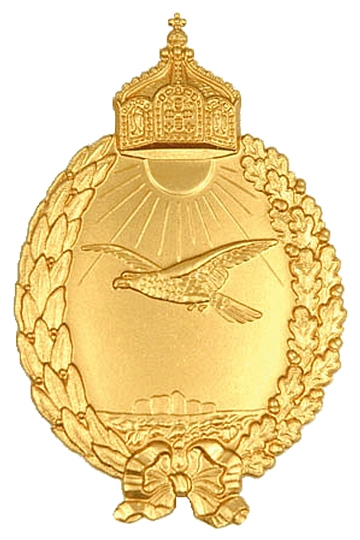
badge for navy pilots from seaplanes 1913

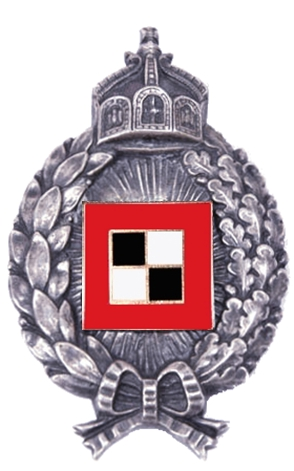
badge for observation officers from airplanes 1914

The Military Pilot Badge was donated on January 27, 1913 by Emperor Wilhelm II. It could be awarded to officers, NCOs and crews who, after completing the two required tests for pilots and after completing their training at a military air base, acquired the certificate as a military pilot issued by the military air and land transportation inspection (Inspektion des Militär-Luft- und Kraft-Fahrtwesens). A similar badge for military pilots was donated on 4 February 1913 by Prince Ludwig from Bavaria.

The badge for navy pilots on seaplanes (Abzeichen für Marine Flugzeugführer auf Seeflugzeugen) was donated on 31 May 1913 by King and Emperor Wilhelm II, for all officers and soldiers, who successfully completed the training on a naval aircraft station and thus received a certificate of qualification as a naval pilot.

The badge for navy pilots on land planes (Abzeichen für Marine Flugzeugführer auf Landflugzeugen) was donated on 23 February 1915 by emperor Wilhelm II for pilots of the Navy, who completed their service in the war on land planes.

The badge for observation officers from airplanes (Abzeichen für Beobachtungsoffiziere aus Flugzeugen) was donated on January 27, 1914 by emperor Wilhelm II. Prerequisites for the award were: 1. a distance traveled of at least 1000 km in an aircraft, 2. a successfully completed technical assistance examination on an aircraft, 3. pass of at least one retake, 4. accomplished exploration missions, and 5. a certification as an observation officer. A similar badge was donated by King Ludwig III. on 3 March 1914 for the Bavarian army.

The airgunner badge (Abzeichen Flugzeug-Fliegerschützen) was founded on January 27, 1918 by emperor Wilhelm II. The soldiers had to demonstrate in-depth knowledge in engine construction and operation, in flight training, in map reading, in the tactics of aerial combat, in theory of bombing, and skills in the operation of machine guns on the ground and in aerial combat.

The commemorative badge for airship crews (Erinnerungsabzeichen für Besatzungen der Luftschiffe) was donated in 1920 by Reichswehr Minister Otto Gessler. There were two versions for Army and Navy airships. Upon request, it was awarded to officers, deck officers, NCOs and crews of former airship crews, who during the war had at least one year of activity on front aircraft.

=== 1935-1945 ===
==== Luftwaffe badges & other awards ====
Combined Pilots-Observation Badge	Pilot's Badge	Observer Badge
Glider Pilot Badge	Radio Operator Badge & Air Gunner Badge	Flyer's Commemorative Badge
Aircrew Badge	Sea Battle Badge	Luftwaffe Flying Clasps

The Pilotenabzeichen (Pilot's Badge) of the former Luftwaffe had been instituted by Hermann Göring on 12 August 1935. It came in distinct types; nickel silver (changed to zinc during the war) and a variant made of gold. It depicts a silver eagle perched atop a swastika, wings open in a landing pose, and surrounded by a wreath with laurel on the right side and oak branches on the left side, respectively. It was worn in the center of the left breast pocket of the service tunic, underneath the Iron Cross 1st Class if awarded. The badge was awarded after one completed flight training and the flying licence and citation were received.

=== After 1955 ===
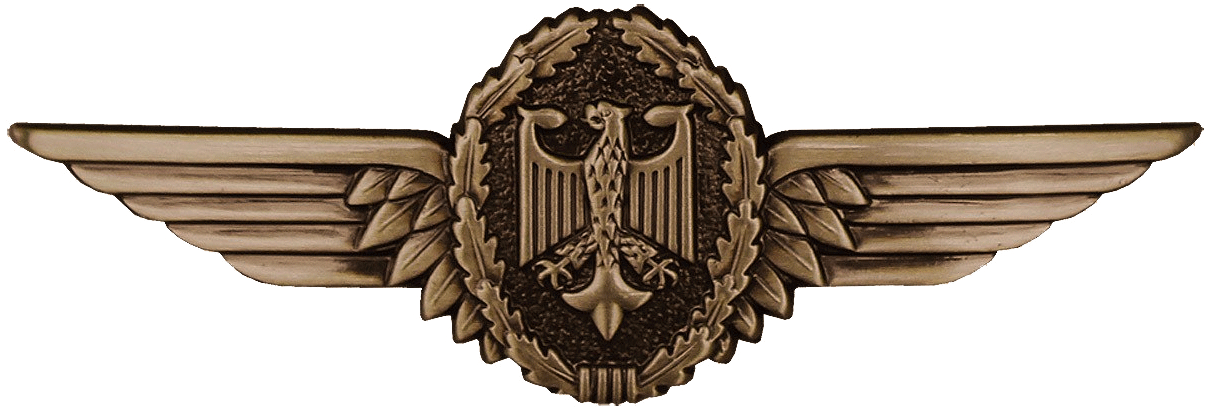
German Aviation Badge in Bronze

In the Bundeswehr the aviation badge (Tätigkeitsabzeichen Militärluftfahrzeugführer) comes in three grades: bronze (Standard Pilot), silver (Senior Pilot) after 1200 flight hours and gold (Command Pilot) after 1800 flight hours. It depicts the Bundesadler surrounded by an oak leaf wreath between two wings. It is worn above the right breast pocket. A total of two Tätigkeitsabzeichen may be worn, one of which can be foreign in which case the foreign one would be worn below the German one.

== Hungary ==
=== 1938-1945 ===
Pilots and navigators of the Royal Hungarian Air Force wore their aviator rating badge sewn on their uniforms right breast above the pocketflap. The Observers Badge was the same, except without the Holy Crown of Hungary. A smaller version of the pilot's badge which was worn on the lower left sleeve of the overcoat - observers also worn a small insignia without the crown on their sleeve. During World War II a gilded bronze pilot and observer badge was also introduced.

Royal Hungarian Air Force Pilots Badge sewn version	Royal Hungarian Air Force Pilots Badge metal version	Royal Hungarian Air Force Observers Badge metal version

=== After 1990 ===
After the withdrawal of Soviet forces from Hungary a new Hungarian Air Force was created. It took on the traditions of the Royal Hungarian Air Force. There are 4 classes of pilots badges. Gold laurel 1st class aviator; 1st class aviator, 2nd class aviator, and 3rd class aviator.

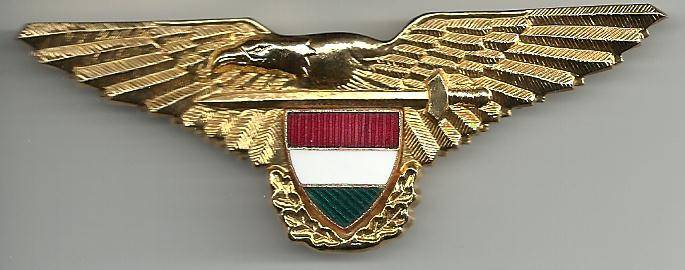
Gold laurel 1st class pilot badge

1st class aviator badge	2nd class aviator badge	3rd class aviator badge

== Israel ==
The current aviator badges ("wings") in the Israel Air Force is:

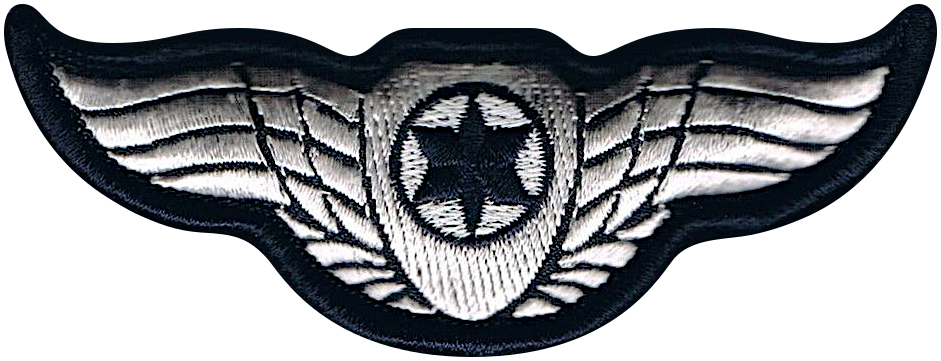
Current badge "wings" of an Israeli Air Force pilot, weapon systems officer, navigator and flight engineer

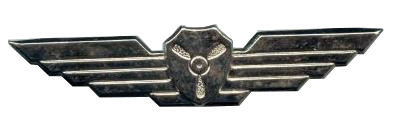
Air Crew chief's Badge

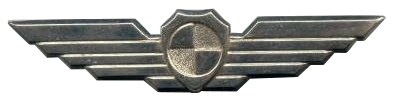
Loadmaster's Badge

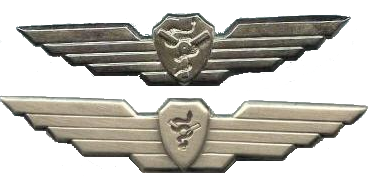
Flight Doctor's and Flight Combat medic's Badge (two versions)

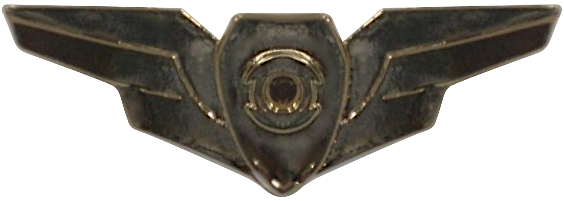
AEW&C Operator's Badge

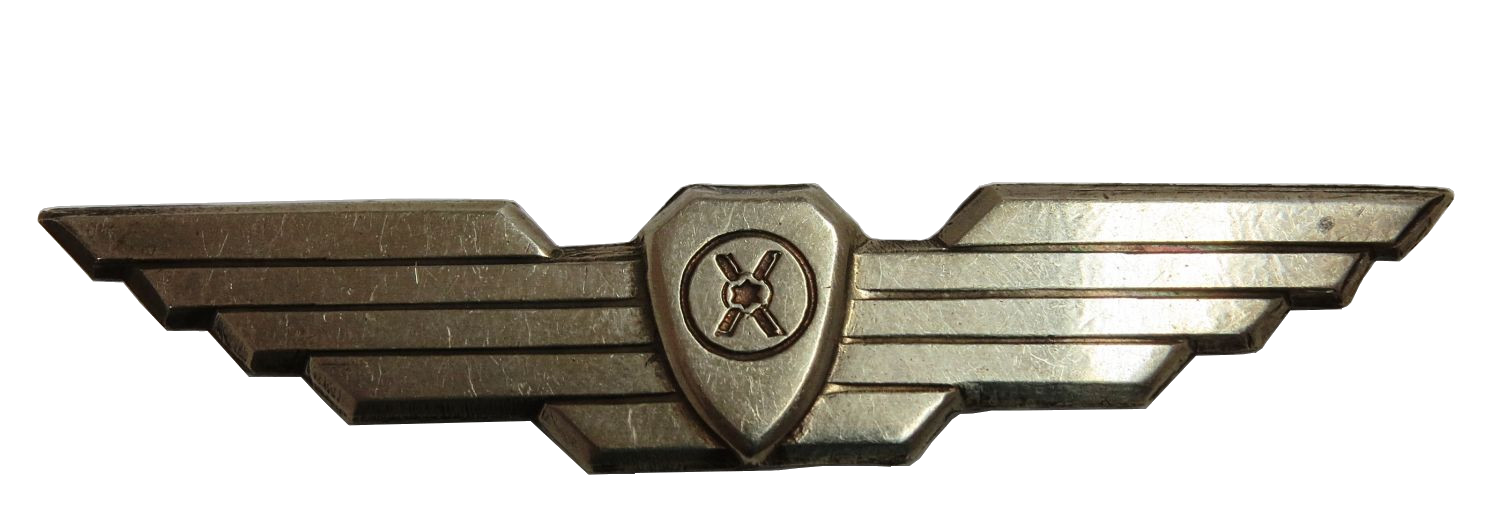
Flight test engineer's Badge

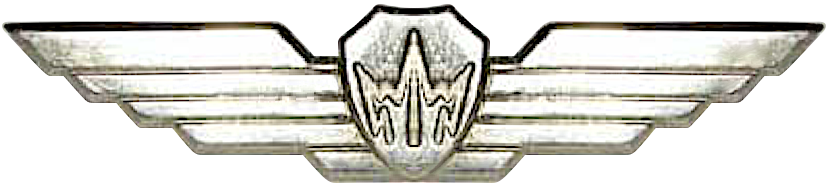
EW operator's Badge

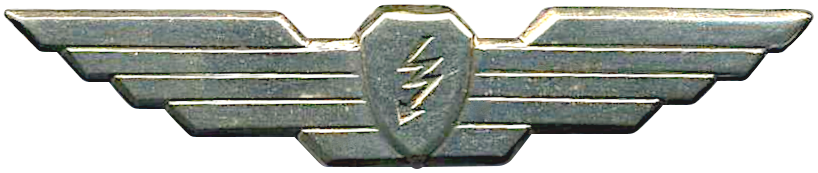
Air Signaller's Badge

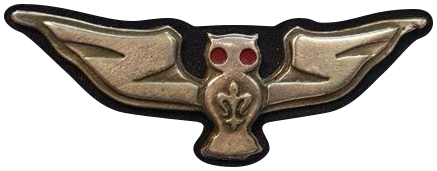
Air observer's Badge

== Namibia ==
The aviator badge of the Namibian Air Force is ...

== The Netherlands ==
The aviator badge of the Royal Netherlands Air Force and the Royal Netherlands Navy is

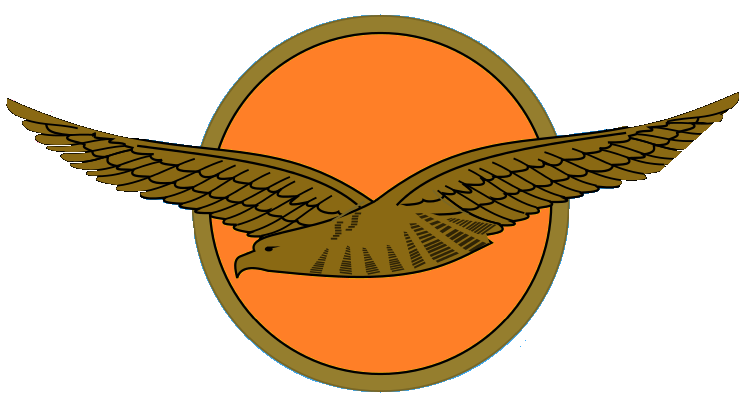
Wing/Badge/Brevet of Royal Netherlands Air Force Pilot

== Pakistan ==
The Aviator Badge of the Pakistan Air Force is:

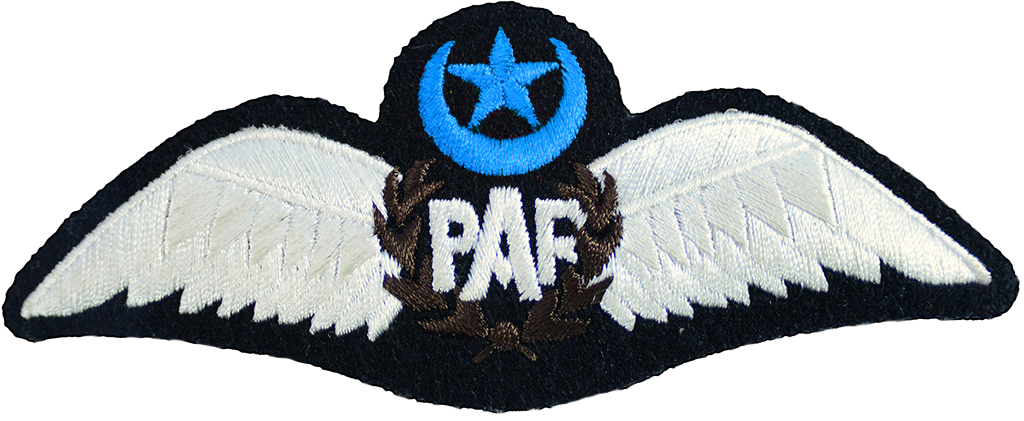
Pakistan Air Force (PAF) Aviator Badge

== Poland ==
The current aviator badge of the Polish Air Force has been in use since the 1920s. The badge is called gapa and represents silver eagle in flight with gold laurel wreath in the bill. Navigator/Observer badge (below) represents the same eagle, but in gold with added lightning bolts. The gapa is worn in the usual place on the upper left breast above the pocket, but unlike other air forces it is suspended on a chain. It adorned the uniform of Polish Air Force officers in the RAF during World War II along with their RAF wings. In the combat version (for at least 7 flights in combat conditions) the badge has a green laurel wreath.

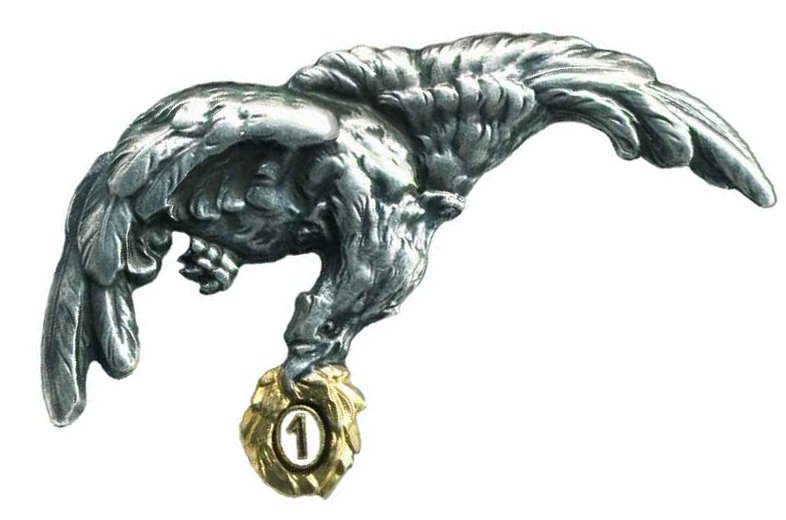
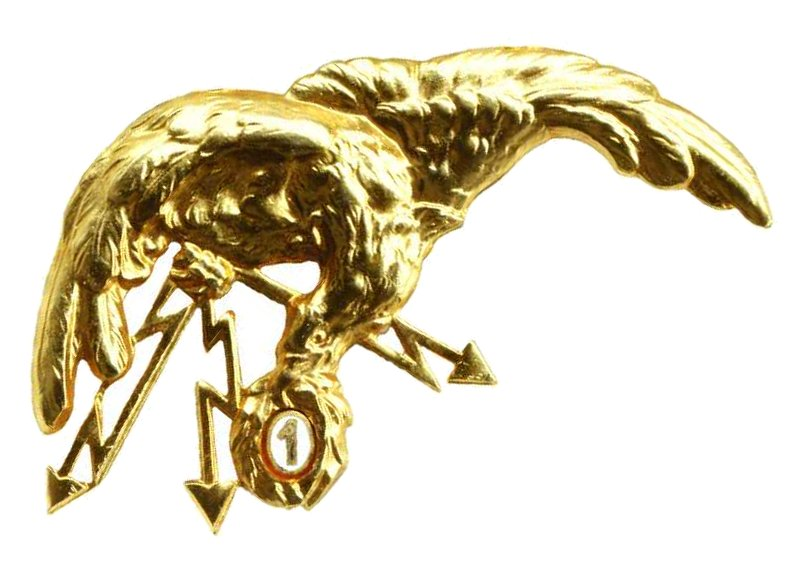
Badge	Pilot	Observer
Air Forces
	Pilot	Observer
Abbreviation	pil.	obs.

== Romania ==
=== 1912–1931 ===
The first military aviator badge of Romania was approved by the Ministry of War in 1912, following the establishment of the first pilot school in Cotroceni. It featured a silver miniature of a Blériot XI worn by pilots and observers on the collar of their tunics. In 1915, after the formation of the Romanian Air Corps, new pilot and observer badges were introduced. The pilot badges featured a silver plated royal eagle holding a bomb in its claws and the royal cypher of King Ferdinand I on its chest. Officers wore the metal badges on the left side of the chest while non-commissioned officers wore a silk badge sewn on the left sleeve. From 1919, NCOs were allowed to wear the same badges as the officers. After the death of King Ferdinand, the badge used the cypher of King Michael I until 1931, when King Carol II introduced new badges.

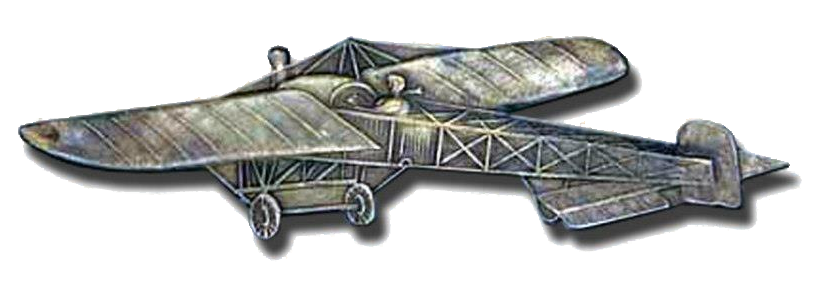
Model 1912 aviator badge

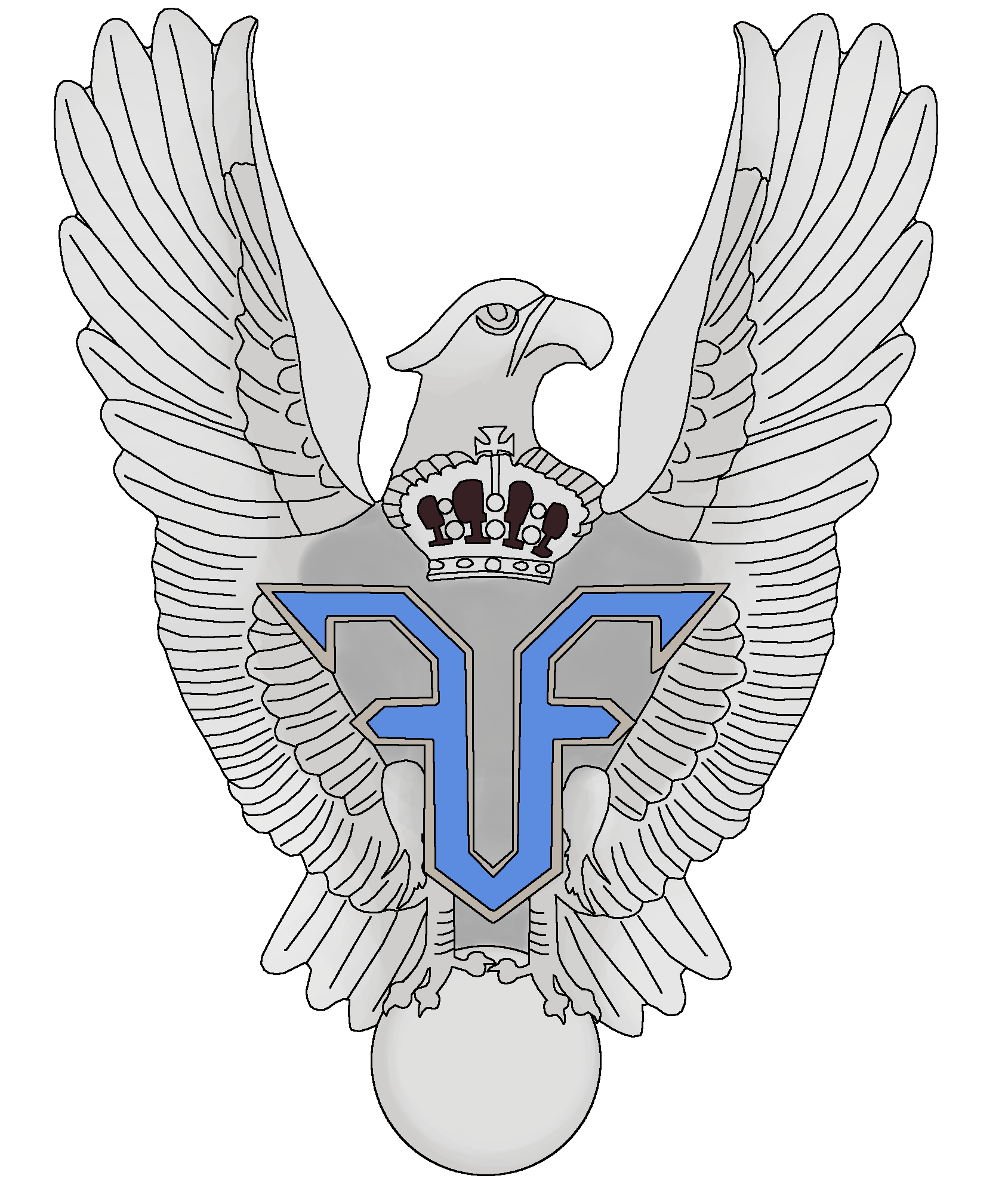
Model 1915 Romanian pilot badge

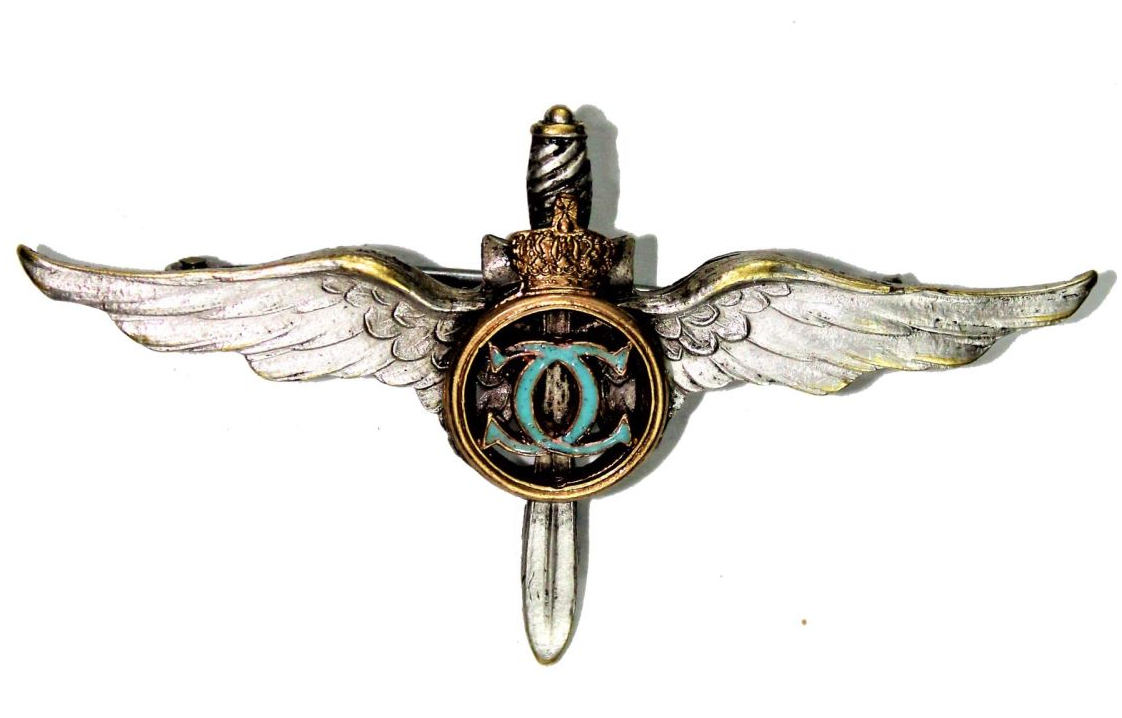
Model 1931 Romanian pilot badge

=== 1941–present ===
At the initiative of General Iosif Iacobici and Air squadron general Gheorghe Jienescu, the military pilot badges, named "war pilot badges", returned to the World War I aspect in 1941 with the difference being the replacement of the royal cypher with the coat of arms of the Kingdom of Romania. After the abdication of King Michael in 1947, the aviator badges were replaced following the Soviet model. During the communist regime, training levels achieved by the pilots were introduced. These levels, classes 1–3, were displayed on the badges in Arabic numerals. In 1977, an initiative launched by some aviators, with support received from Nicu Ceaușescu, youngest child of Nicolae Ceaușescu, brought back the old-style pilot badges. The new badges copied the model 1941 ones, with the coat of arms of the Socialist Republic of Romania shown instead. After 1989, the decision was taken to issue new badges with the center coat of arms replaced by the Romanian cockade due to the lack of a new heraldic emblem. The present Romanian Air Force pilot badges were adopted in 1996.

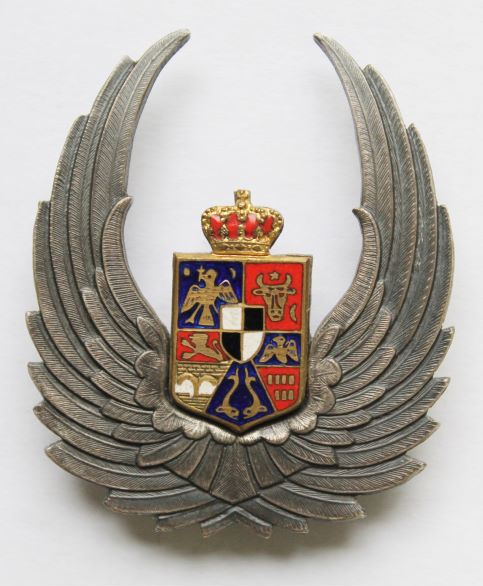
Model 1941 observer badge

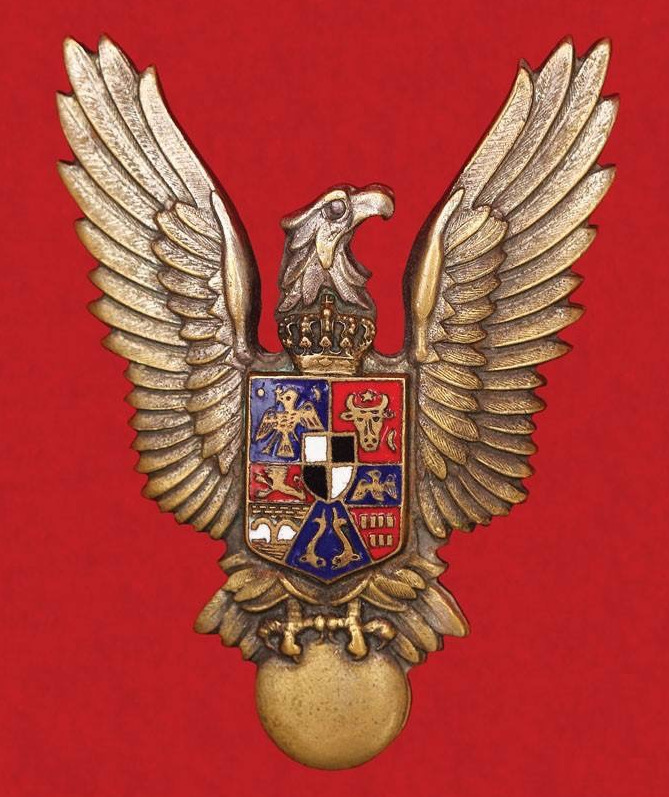
Model 1941 pilot badge

Current pilot badge, 1st class

== South Africa ==
The current aviator badge of the South African Air Force has been in use since 2002, when South Africa adopted a new coat of arms. Like the RAF, the SAAF also has a half-wing version of the badge, in this case for navigators. The aviator and navigator badges comes in three grades: bronze, silver and gold. Reserve force aviator badges have a light blue inlay around the coat of arms as appose to the dark blue of permanent air force aviators.

== Spain ==
Air Force Pilot

Army Aviator

Naval Aviator

Guardia Civil Aviator

National Police Corps Aviator

== Turkey ==
Turkish Air Force aviator

== United Kingdom ==
The current aviator badge of the Royal Air Force has been in use since the Second World War. The badge consists of a winged crown and wreath, beneath which are the letters "RAF". The Royal Air Force also uses a "half wing" version to denote Weapon System Officers (WSOs) and Weapon System Operators (WSOps) as well as various airborne roles such as Airborne Technician.

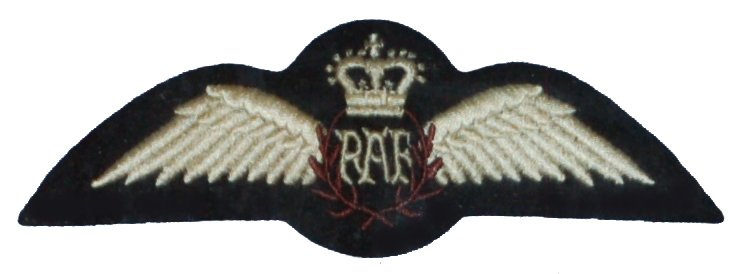
Royal Air Force Pilot Flying Badge

== United States ==
A Military Aviator badge existed from 1912-17 before being replaced by the predecessor of the "wings" badge.

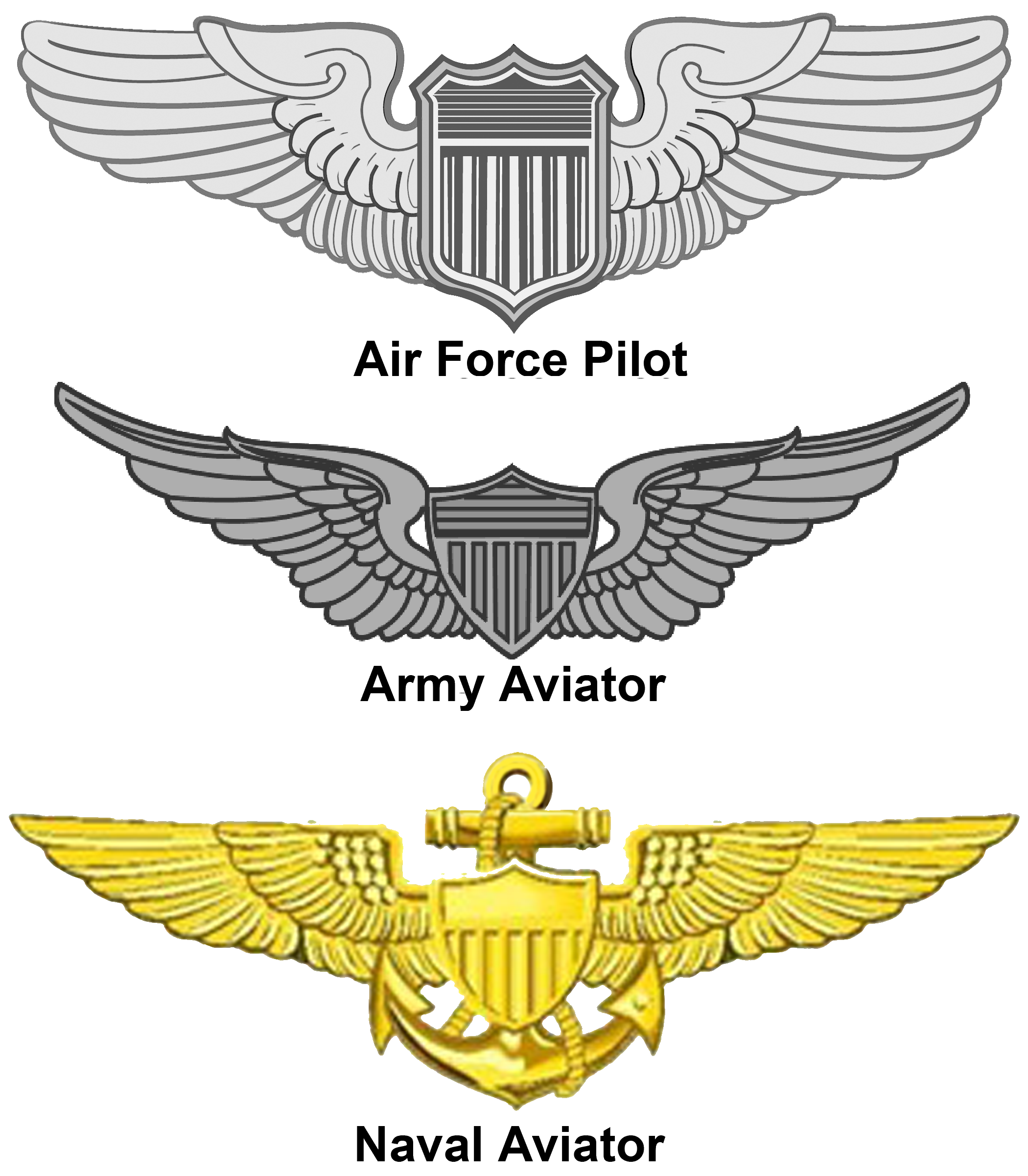
From top to bottom: the basic United States Air Force Pilot Badge, United States Army Aviator Badge, and the Naval Aviator Insignia (issued by the United States Navy, United States Marine Corps, United States Coast Guard)

The United States aviator badges (commonly referred to as "wings") refers to the various aviator badges and insignia issued by the uniformed services of the United States; the United States Army, United States Air Force (USAF), United States Navy (USN), United States Marine Corps (USMC), United States Coast Guard (USCG), and the National Oceanographic and Atmospheric Administration Commissioned Officer Corps (NOAA Corps) to qualified aircraft pilots. The United States Space Force (USSF) and the United States Public Health Service Commissioned Corps (USPHSCC) are the only uniformed services which do not issue their own aviator badges; however, USSF and USPHSCC personnel are authorized to wear most badges earned from another uniformed service, to include aviator badges.

The NOAA Corps, USN, USMC, and USCG all issue an aviator badge in a single degree, with the latter three branches sharing the same design. The Army and USAF each issue distinct badges to their aviators, with each badge authorized in three degrees to recognize skill and experience levels. All U.S. armed services (excluding the USSF) issue aircrew badges to personnel that are not pilots but are regularly engaged in flight as part of their official duties. The Army, USAF, USN (USMC medical personnel are provided by the USN), and USCG also all issue various "wings" to aviation medical personnel, such as the Army Flight Surgeon Badge, the USAF Flight Nurse Badge, the USN Aerospace Experimental Psychologist Badge, and the USCG Flight Surgeon Badge, among others. The USAF additionally issues a variety of "aeronautical" insignia to flying personnel that are neither "aviator" nor "aircrew" badges, such as the USAF Combat Systems Officer Badge or the USAF Air Battle Manager Badge.

The USAF's civilian auxiliary, the Civil Air Patrol; and the USCG's civilian auxiliary, the United States Coast Guard Auxiliary, both issue unique aviator badges, while also permitting wear of military badges, to include aviator badges. Civilian airlines in the U.S. (and globally) generally issue aviator badges to pilots, and may also issue modified variants of the same badges to other crew members (flight engineers, flight stewards, loadmasters, etc), though some entities utilize dedicated aircrew badges to recognize non-pilots. Other, non-military, non-airline U.S. entities may also issue or award aviator badges; The Federal Aviation Administration (FAA) offers badges in varying degrees to recognize completion of various stages of the FAA's WINGS Pilot Proficiency Program. U.S. federal, state, and local law enforcement agencies may issue aviator and aircrew badges to personnel that qualify as law enforcement pilots or aircrew, respectively. U.S. civilian flight schools, aviation clubs and organizations (e.g. Seaplane Pilots Association or the Experimental Aircraft Association), and youth programs (e.g. Boy Scouts of America or Aviation Career Exploring) also issue a variety of aviator badges (usually but not always modeled as "wings").

== See also ==
- Airline pilot uniforms
- Aviator sunglasses
- Flight helmet
- Leather flying helmet
