= Observer Badge (Luftwaffe) =

Observer's badge Beobachterabzeichen
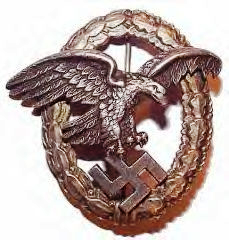
- Observer's badge
- Type: Badge
- Presented by: Nazi Germany
- Eligibility: Military personnel
- Campaign: World War II
- Established: 1935
- First award: 1936
- Final award: 1945
- Related: Pilot’s Badge; Pilot/Observer Badge; Glider Pilot Badge; Balloon Observer's Badge; Air Gunner Badge; Radio Operator Badge; Flyer's Commemorative Badge; Aircrew Badge; Luftwaffe Flying Clasps

The Observer's Badge (German: Beobachterabzeichen) was a German military decoration that was awarded before and during World War II to members of the German Air Force (Luftwaffe). They qualified for the badge after completing two months of qualifying service and five operational flights in the role of observer, navigator or bombardier; also, it could be awarded after a member of the German Air Force was wounded while acting in the capacity of an observer during a qualifying flight. It was worn on the left breast tunic pocket of an air force or political uniform tunic. A citation was issued with the awarded badge. Thereafter, Luftwaffe service personnel who had already been awarded the Pilot's Badge and Observer's Badge could qualify for the Pilot/Observer Badge. After 31 July 1944 the regulations were changed and the recipient had to have held both qualification certificates for at least one year to qualify for the Pilot/Observer Badge.

== Description ==
The badge was approved in November 1935 and first issued on 26 March 1936. It was made by C. E. Juncker, P. Meybauer and several others. The badge was oval in shape and had a silver-plated oakleaf wreath around the outside. The middle of the wreath had an "oxidized" national eagle "in a watching attitude", clutching a Nazi swastika in the middle of the outside wreath. Originally made of silver nickel, after 1937 they were made of aluminum and during World War II it was made of metal alloy. The badge measured 42mm wide by 53mm high and the wingspan of the eagle's wings in the middle was 53mm. There was also a cloth version of the badge. The presentation case was dark blue, with a blue satin top liner and a blue velvet bottom liner on the inside.

== See also ==
- Aircrew Badge (Nazi)
