= Aircraft pilot =

Person controlling an aircraft in flight

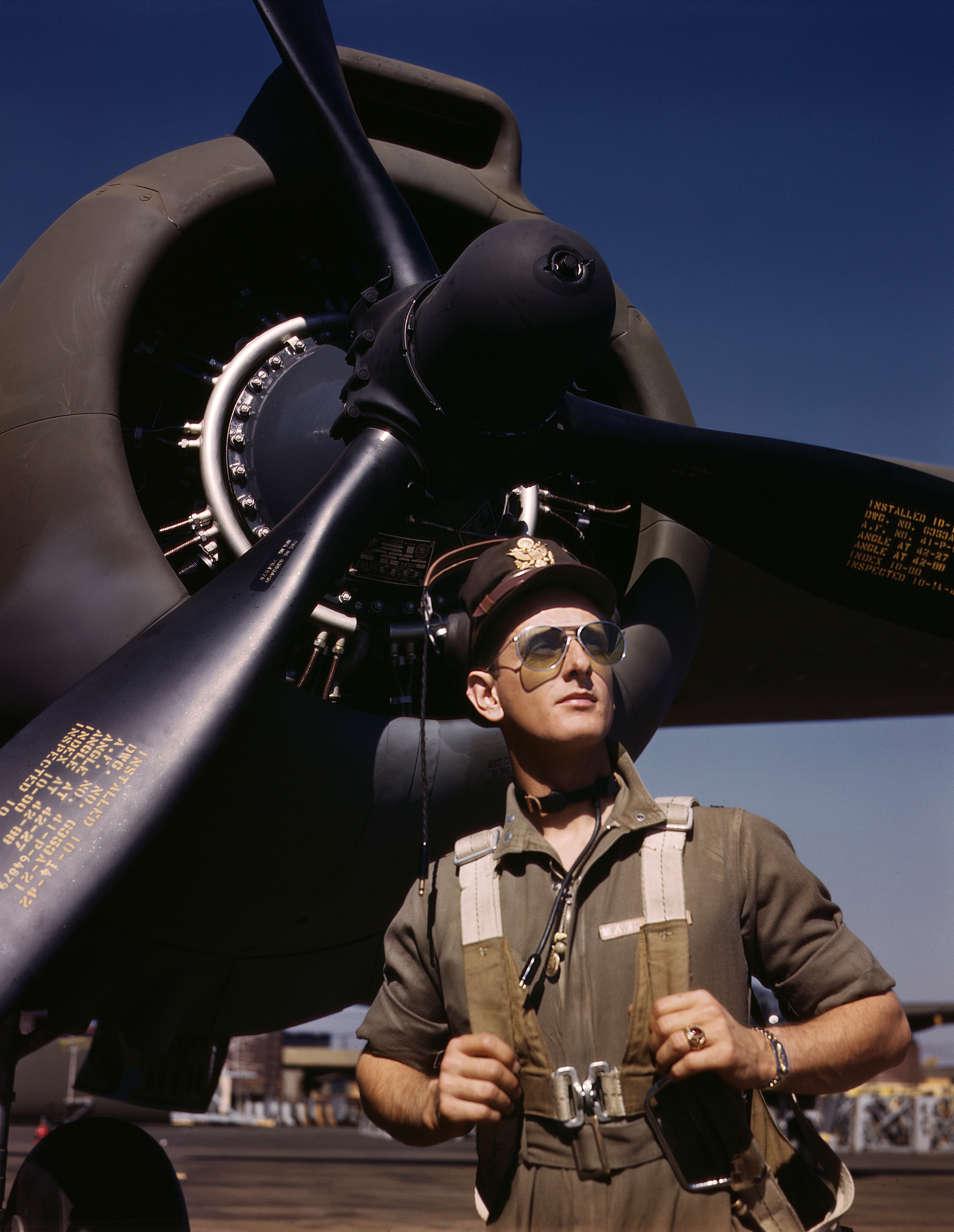
U.S. Army Air Forces test pilot Lt. F.W. "Mike" Hunter wearing a flight suit in October 1942

An aircraft pilot (or aviator) is an individual who controls an aircraft's flight by operating its directional controls. Other aircrew members, such as navigators and flight engineers, are also considered aviators because they assist in operating the aircraft’s navigation and engine systems. Aircrew members like drone operators, flight attendants, mechanics, and ground crew are not classified as aviators.

To recognize pilots' qualifications and responsibilities, most militaries and many airlines around the world award aviator badges to their pilots.

== Definition ==
The first recorded use of the term aviator (aviateur in French) was in 1887, as a variation of aviation, from the Latin avis (meaning bird), coined in 1863 by G. J. G. de La Landelle in Aviation Ou Navigation Aérienne ("Aviation or Air Navigation"). The term aviator was used for any pilot or specifically a male pilot. The term aviatrix (aviatrice in French), now archaic, was used for a female pilot.

These terms were used more in the early days of aviation, when airplanes were extremely rare, and connoted bravery and adventure. For example, a 1905 reference work described the Wright brothers' first airplane: "The weight, including the body of the aviator, is a little more than 700 pounds". Since the 1950s, the term "pilot" is used almost exclusively, even in regulations, and people who operate aircraft obtain a pilot licence.

== History ==
To ensure the safety of people in the air and on the ground, early aviation soon required that aircraft be under the operational control of a properly trained, certified pilot at all times, who is responsible for the safe and legal completion of the flight. The Aéro-Club de France delivered the first certificate to Louis Blériot in 1908—followed by Glenn Curtiss, Léon Delagrange, and Robert Esnault-Pelterie. The British Royal Aero Club followed in 1910 and the Aero Club of America in 1911 (Glenn Curtiss receiving the first).

== Civilian ==
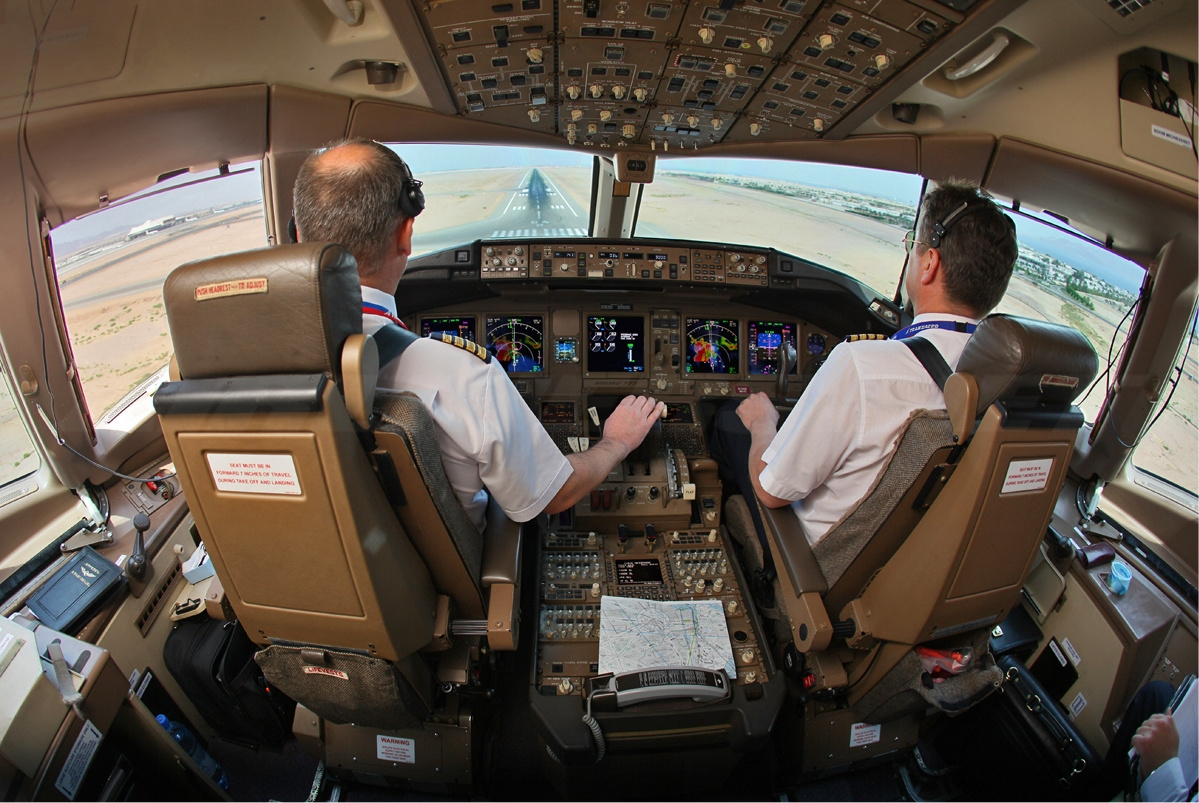
Pilots landing a Boeing 777

Civilian pilots fly aircraft of all types privately for pleasure, charity, or in pursuance of a business, or commercially for non-scheduled (charter) and scheduled passenger and cargo air carriers (airlines), corporate aviation, agriculture (crop dusting, etc.), forest fire control, law enforcement, etc. When flying for an airline, pilots are usually referred to as airline pilots, with the pilot in command often referred to as the captain.

=== Airline ===
As of 2025, the Federal Aviation Administration (FAA) reported 887,519 certificated pilots in the United States, of whom 41 percent were student pilots. Long-term forecasts project substantial demand for airline pilots, although needs vary by region and over time. Boeing's Pilot and Technician Outlook: 2026–2045 forecasts demand for 674,000 new commercial pilots worldwide between 2026 and 2045. Boeing attributes about two-thirds of the projected demand to replacing pilots leaving the workforce, while about one-third is associated with fleet growth. The report describes the global pilot supply as generally balanced but notes that some regions continue to face recruiting and retention challenges.

Boeing's Pilot and Technician Outlook: 2026–2045 also projects regional demand for new commercial pilots between 2026 and 2045:

Boeing Pilot and Technician Outlook: Forecast demand for new commercial pilots by region (2026–2045)
Region	New commercial pilots needed
North America	122,000
Eurasia	153,000
Middle East	67,000
China	123,000
Northeast Asia	24,000
Latin America	38,000
Africa	22,000
South Asia	48,000
Southeast Asia	66,000
Oceania	11,000

In the United States, the Bureau of Labor Statistics (BLS) projects employment of airline and commercial pilots to increase from about 100,000 in 2024 to 103,900 in 2034, a growth rate of 4 percent. The BLS expects approximately 18,200 openings annually for airline and commercial pilots during this period, primarily because of workers leaving the occupation or retiring.

Competition for qualified pilots affects both airlines and business aviation. In the United States, regional airlines have experienced pilot shortages as larger carriers have recruited from their ranks, prompting some regional carriers to increase salaries and offer hiring and retention incentives. Compensation for airline pilots has also risen substantially; according to the U.S. Bureau of Labor Statistics, the median annual wage for airline pilots, copilots, and flight engineers in the air transportation industry was $293,240 in 2025. Business aviation operators also compete for experienced pilots, especially from airlines offering predictable schedules, compensation, retirement benefits, and job stability. In response, business aviation employers have increased compensation and placed greater emphasis on scheduling, workplace culture, and other retention measures. According to the National Business Aviation Association's 2025 Compensation Survey, pilot base salaries in business aviation increased 28 percent between 2021 and 2025, while total cash compensation increased 31 percent.

==== Automation ====
The number of airline pilots could decrease as automation replaces copilots and eventually pilots as well. In January 2017 Rhett Ross, CEO of Continental Motors said "my concern is that in the next two decades—if not sooner—automated and autonomous flight will have developed sufficiently to put downward pressure on both wages and the number and kind of flying jobs available. So if a kid asks the question now and he or she is 18, 20 years from now will be 2037 and our would-be careerist will be 38—not even mid-career. Who among us thinks aviation and especially for-hire flying will look like it does now?" Christian Dries, owner of Diamond Aircraft Austria said "Behind the curtain, aircraft manufacturers are working on a single-pilot cockpit where the airplane can be controlled from the ground and only in case of malfunction does the pilot of the plane interfere. Basically the flight will be autonomous and I expect this to happen in the next five to six years for freighters."

Regulations have to adapt with air cargo likely at the forefront, but pilotless flights could be limited by consumer behaviour: 54% of 8,000 people surveyed are defiant while 17% are supportive, with acceptation progressively forecast.

AVweb reporter Geoff Rapoport stated, "pilotless aircraft are an appealing prospect for airlines bracing for the need to hire several hundred thousand new pilots in the next decade. Wages and training costs have been rapidly rising at regional U.S. airlines over the last several years as the major airlines have hired pilots from the regionals at unprecedented rates to cover increased air travel demand from economic expansion and a wave of retirements".

Going to pilotless airliners could be done in one bold step or in gradual improvements like by reducing the cockpit crew for long haul missions or allowing single pilot cargo aircraft. The industry has not decided how to proceed yet. Present automated systems are not autonomous and must be monitored; their replacement could require artificial intelligence with machine learning while present certified software is deterministic. As the Airbus A350 would only need minor modifications, Air Caraibes and French Bee parent Groupe Dubreuil see two-pilot crews in long-haul operations, without a third pilot for rotation, happening around 2024–2025.

Single-pilot freighters could start with regional flights. The Air Line Pilots Association believe removing pilots would threaten aviation safety and opposes the April 2018 FAA Reauthorization Act's Section 744 establishing a research and development program to assist single-pilot cargo aircraft by remote and computer piloting.

For French aerospace research center Onera and avionics manufacturer Thales, artificial intelligence (AI) like consumer neural networks learning from large datasets cannot explain their operation and cannot be certified for safe air transport. Progress towards ‘explainable’ AIs can be expected in the next decade, as the Onera expects "leads" for a certifiable AI system, along EASA standards evolution.

=== Africa and Asia ===
In some countries, such as Pakistan, Thailand and several African nations, there is a strong relationship between the military and the principal national airlines, and many airline pilots come from the military; however, that is no longer the case in the United States and Western Europe. While the flight decks of U.S. and European airliners do have ex-military pilots, many pilots are civilians. Military training and flying, while rigorous, is fundamentally different in many ways from civilian piloting.

=== Canada ===
Operating an aircraft in Canada is regulated by the Aeronautics Act of 1985 and the Canadian Aviation Regulations provide rules for Pilot licensing in Canada.

Retirement age is provided by each airline, with some set to age 60, but changes to the Canadian Human Rights Act have restricted the retirement age set by the airlines.

=== United States ===
In the United States in 2020, there were 691,691 active pilot certificates. This was down from a high of over 800,000 active pilots in 1980. Of the active pilot certificate holders, there were 160,860 Private, 103,879 Commercial, 164,193 Airline Transport, and 222,629 Student.

In 1930, the Air Commerce Act established pilot licensing requirements for American civil aviation.

Commercial airline pilots in the United States have a mandatory retirement age of 65, having increased from age 60 in 2007.

== Military ==
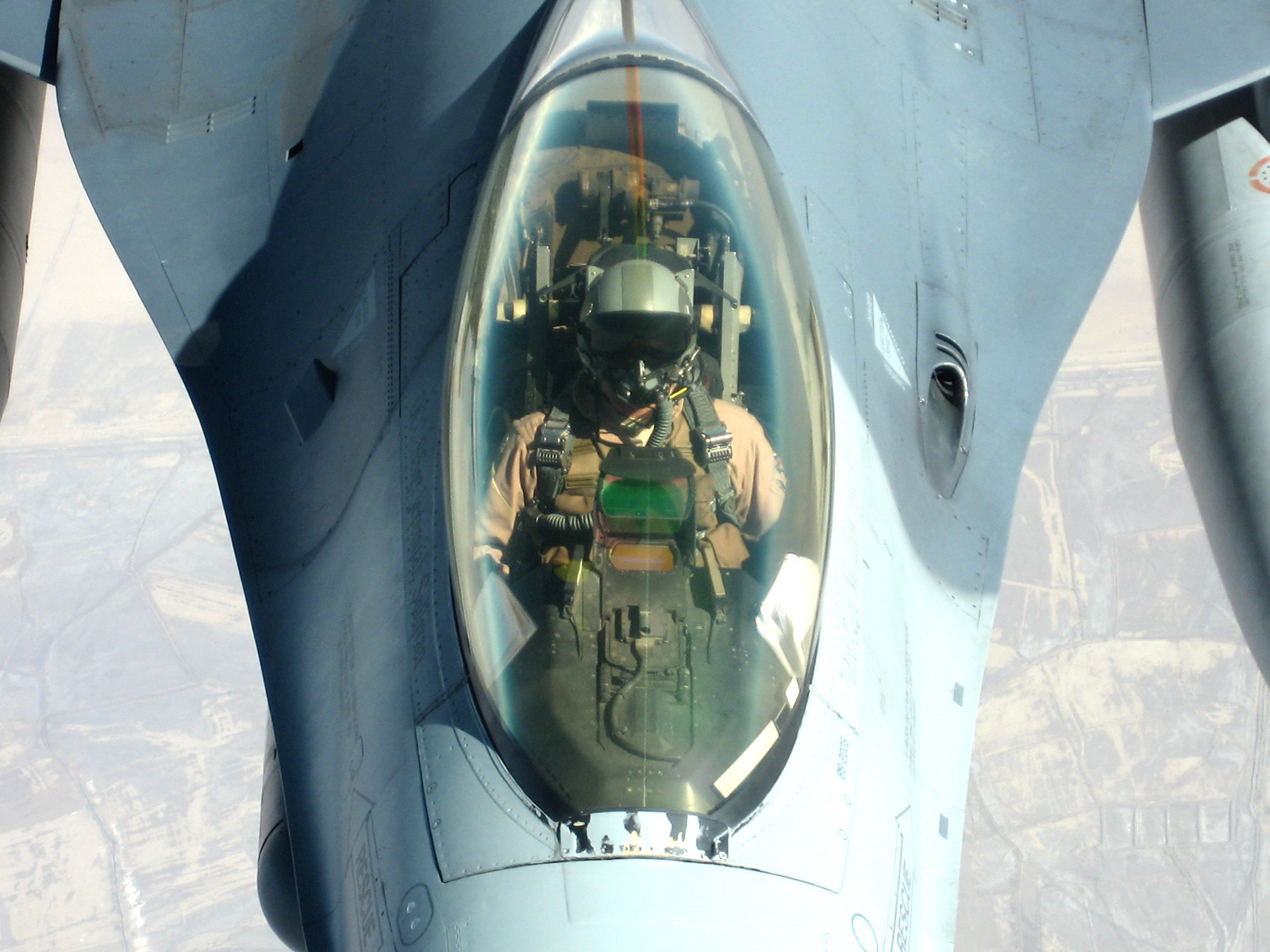
A U.S. Air Force F-16 pilot in flight

Military pilots fly with the armed forces, primarily the air forces, of a government or nation-state. Their tasks involve combat and non-combat operations, including direct hostile engagements and support operations. Military pilots undergo specialized training, often with weapons. Examples of military pilots include fighter pilots, bomber pilots, transport pilots, test pilots, and astronauts.

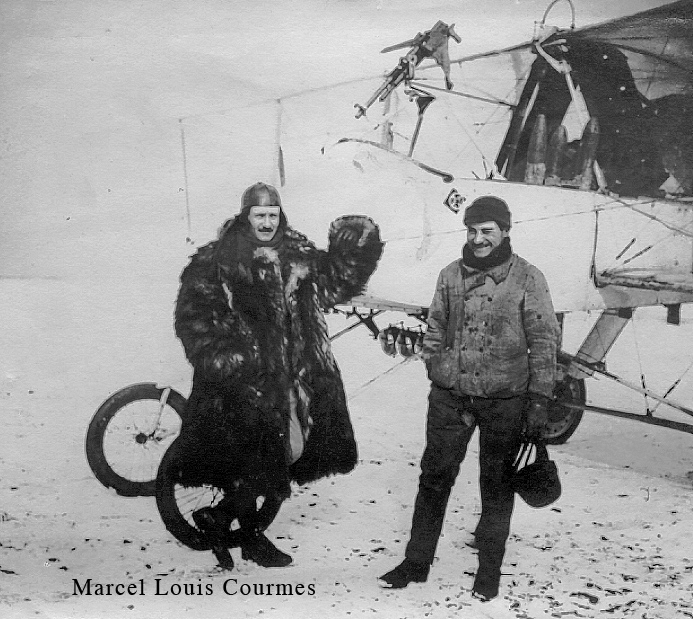
Captain Marcel Courmes, French officer and pilot of the 2nd Bombardment Group GB 2, August 1915

Military pilots are trained with a different syllabus than civilian pilots, which is delivered by military instructors. This is due to the different aircraft, flight goals, flight situations and chains of responsibility. Many military pilots do transfer to civilian-pilot qualification after they leave the military, and typically their military experience provides the basis for a civilian pilot's license.

It was in France that the world's first bombing group was created, on November 23, 1914. The Voisin III were the only aircraft available for this mission. These could only carry very light loads (between 55–160 kg of bombs), the bombs were rudimentary and the aiming systems remained to be developed. Initially, the bombs were simply thrown overboard by the crew, with necessarily very limited accuracy.

Nevertheless, the beginnings of tactical and strategic bombing took place in the first days of the war. Thus, the Royal Naval Air Service (RNAS) carried out bombing missions of the hangars of the airports of Düsseldorf, Cologne and Friedrichhafen during the autumn of 1914. The formation of the Brieftauben Abteilung Ostende ("Ostend Carrier Pigeon Detachment", name of code of the first German bombing units) carried out bombing missions over the English Channel in December 1914.

== Unmanned aerial vehicles ==
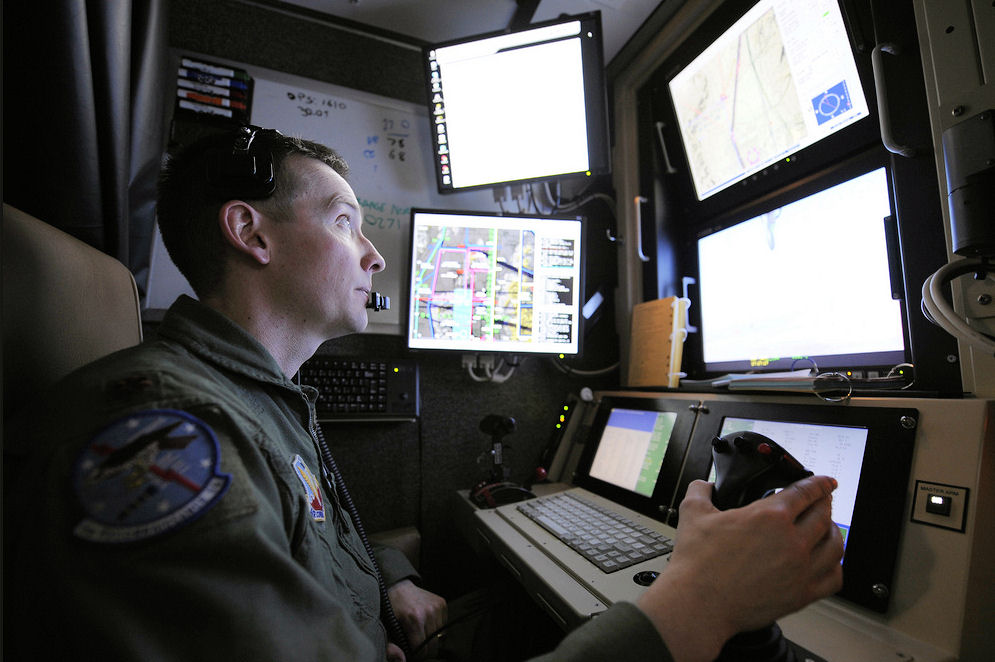
A United States Air Force RPA pilot

Unmanned aerial vehicles (UAVs, also known as "drones") operate without a pilot on board and are classed into two categories: autonomous aircraft that operate without active human control during flight and remotely piloted UAVs which are operated remotely by one or more persons. The person controlling a remotely piloted UAV may be referred to as its pilot or operator. Depending on the sophistication and use of the UAV, pilots/operators of UAVs may require certification or training, but are generally not subject to the licensing/certification requirements of pilots of manned aircraft. Some UAV's can be bought online and are not in military use.

Most jurisdictions have restrictions on the use of UAVs which have greatly limited their use in controlled airspace; UAVs have mostly been limited to military and hobbyist use. In the United States, use of UAVs is very limited in controlled airspace (generally, above 400 ft/122m and away from airports), and the FAA prohibits nearly all commercial use. Once regulations are made to allow expanded use of UAVs in controlled airspace, there is expected to be a large surge of UAVs in use and, consequently, high demand for pilots/operators of these aircraft.

== Space ==
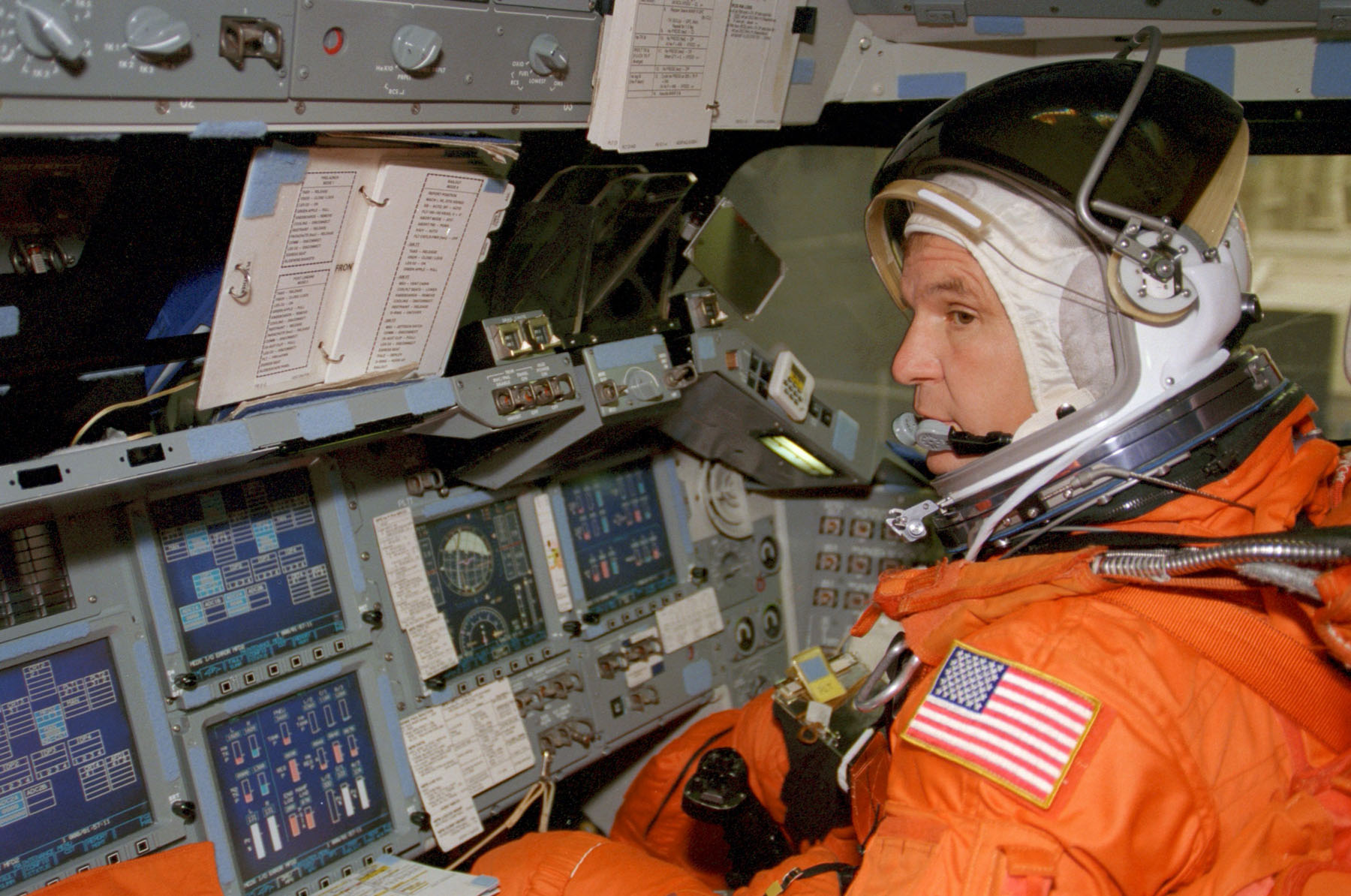
An astronaut going through pilot training exercise

The general concept of an airplane pilot can be applied to human spaceflight, as well. The pilot is the astronaut who directly controls the operation of a spacecraft. This term derives directly from the usage of the word "pilot" in aviation, where it is synonymous with "aviator".

== Pilot certifications ==
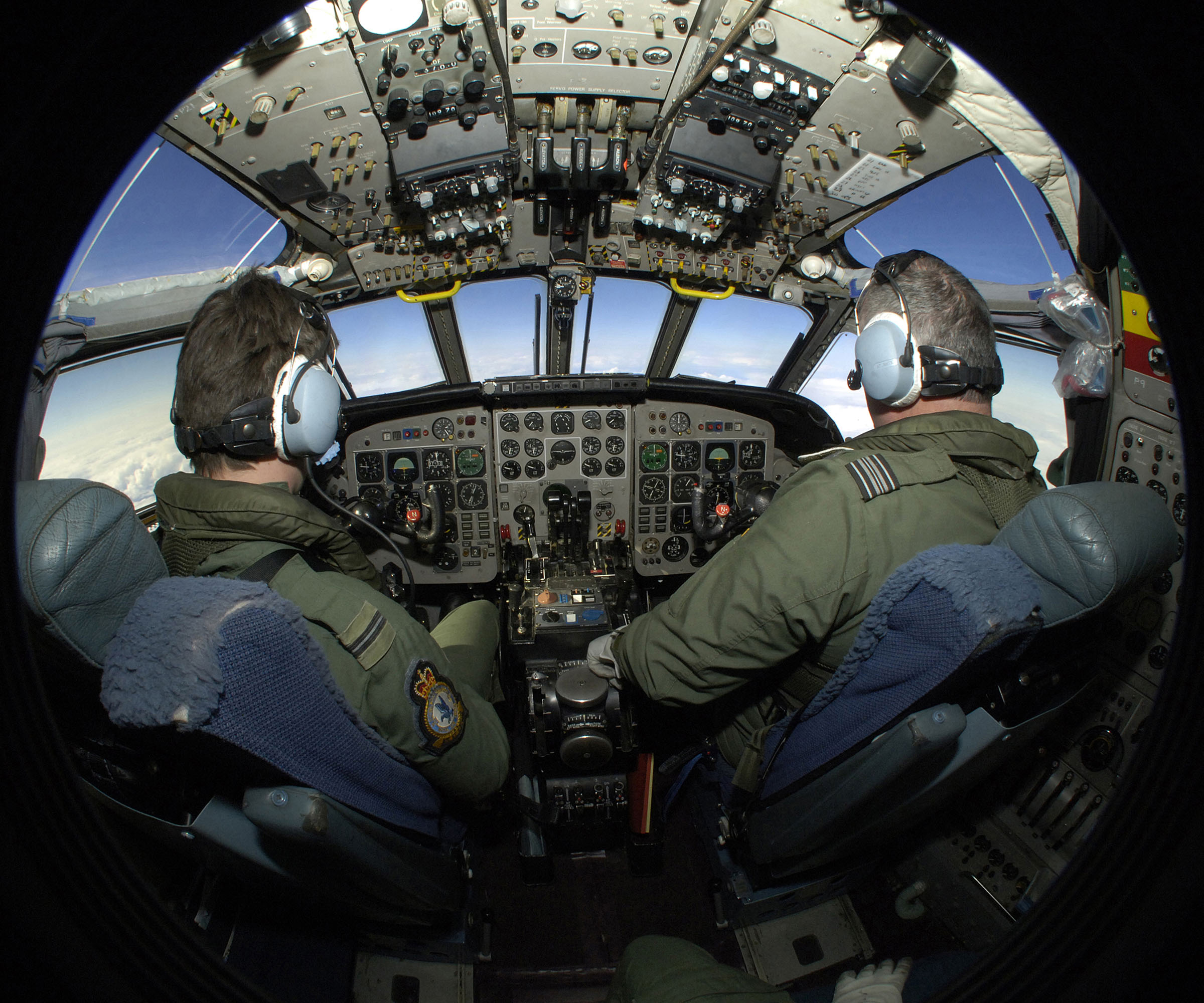
Military aviation training in a Royal Air Force Nimrod aircraft

Pilots are required to go through many hours of flight training and theoretical study, that differ depending on the country. The first step is acquiring the Private Pilot License (PPL), or Private Pilot Certificate. In the United States of America, this includes a minimum of 35 to 40 hours of flight training, the majority of which with a Certified Flight Instructor.

In the United States, an LSA (Light Sport Aircraft) license can be obtained in at least 20 hours of flight time.

Generally, the next step in a pilot's progression is Instrument Rating (IR), or Multi-Engine Rating (MEP) addons. Pilots may also choose to pursue a Commercial Pilot License (CPL) after completing their PPL. This is required if the pilot desires to pursue a professional career as a pilot. To captain an airliner, one must obtain an Airline Transport Pilot License (ATPL). In the United States after 1 August 2013, an ATPL is required even when acting as a first officer. Some countries/carriers require/use a multi-crew cooperation (MCC) certificate.

== Life expectancy ==
There is a popular belief that airline pilots die earlier than the general population. This belief was not supported by 1990s studies of American Airlines and British Airways pilots. A hoax claiming to show an inverse relationship between retirement age and life expectancy was refuted by Boeing. However, a 1992 study of several airline pilot associations' data found evidence of higher mortality.

A 1978 study of military pilots found increased longevity, which was attributed to "generally good socioeconomic background, the positive genetic influence of long-lived parents, the above average intelligence, and the health and fitness orientation of the military aviator".

== See also ==
- Airline pilot uniforms
- Air safety
- IMSAFE (mnemonic for pilot's fitness to fly)
- List of aerospace engineers
- List of aviators
- Pilot fatigue
- Pilot logbook
