= Award pin =

Recognising an achievement

Pilot Proficiency Award pins

An award pin is a small object, usually made from metal or plastic, with a pin on the back, presented as an award of achievement or a mark of appreciation. They are worn on clothes such as jackets, shirts or hats.

== Description ==
Award pins usually have an image or words, or both, depicting the reason for the award.

An award pin series that is offered by the U.S. Government to all eligible civilians is the Pilot Proficiency Award Program. Award pins are commonly given to participants of youth sports as a method to reinforce excellent play and sportsmanship. There are many companies that provide Sports Award Pins.

Award pins can usually be plated on Gold (plain or antique), Silver (plain or antique), Nickel and Black Nickel or Copper (plain or antique).

During the manufacturing process pins can be filled with enamel colors and then covered with a thin coat of epoxy to protect these colors.

== Noteworthy award pins ==
The Astronaut pin is awarded to military and civilian personnel who have completed training and performed a successful spaceflight and is the least-awarded qualification badge of the United States military.

After Apollo 1's fire in 1967, NASA turned to Charles Schulz to use the character Snoopy for its new safety award. The Silver Snoopy award pin was created to reward those who significantly contribute to the safety of spaceflight operations. It is one of the highest awards in NASA and the space industry.

In 2010, the French Minister of Culture Frédéric Mitterrand slightly pinned Marion Cotillard's chest as he decorated her with the award pin of the Chevalier de l’Ordre des Arts et des Lettres.

== See also ==
- Badge
- Lapel pin
