= Ernst-August Roth =

- Born: 19 April 1898; Potsdam, Province of Brandenburg, Kingdom of Prussia, German Empire
- Died: 26 September 1975 (aged 77); Ahrensburg, Schleswig-Holstein, West Germany
- Relatives: ∞ 1922 Bertha Marieluise Plate; 2 children
- Military career
- Allegiance: German Empire; Weimar Republic; Nazi Germany
- Branch: Imperial German Navy; Reichsmarine; Luftwaffe
- Service years: 1916—1928; 1934—1945
- Rank: Generalleutnant
- Unit: II. Seeflieger-Abteilung
- Commands: KG 40; KG 28; Fliegerführer Nord
- Conflicts: World War I World War II: Operation Weserübung; Battle of Britain; Eastern Front; Arctic convoys of World War II
- Awards: Knight's Cross of the Iron Cross
- Other work: Civilian employee of the Reichsmarine (1931 to 1933); Civilian advisor with the RLM (April 1933 to January 1934)

Ernst-August Roth (19 April 1898 – 26 September 1975) was a highly decorated Generalleutnant in the Luftwaffe during World War II. He was also a recipient of the Knight's Cross of the Iron Cross. Acting as the second and last Commanding General of the German Luftwaffe in Norway from 10 October 1944 to 8 May 1945, he was captured by British troops in June 1945 and was held until March 1948.

== Promotions ==
- 3 January 1916 Seekadett
- 12 October 1916 Fähnrich zur See
- 17 March 1918 Leutnant zur See
- 1 April 1922 Oberleutnant zur See
- 31 March 1928 Charakter als Kapitänleutnant
  - retired as honorary Lieutenant Captain on 31 March or 1 April 1928
- 1 January 1934 Kapitänleutnant (Lieutenant Captain)

=== Luftwaffe ===
- 3 January 1934 Hauptmann (Captain)
- 1 January 1935 Major and DLV-Fliegerkommandant
- 16 March 1937 Oberstleutnant (Lieutenant Colonel) with effect and Rank Seniority (RDA) from 1 March 1937 (3)
- 1 June 1939 Oberst (Colonel)
- 1 August 1942 Generalmajor (Major General)
- 1 January 1945 Generalleutnant (Lieutenant General)

== Awards and decorations ==
- Iron Cross (1914), 2nd Class
- Badge for naval pilots on land-based aircraft
- Erinnerungsabzeichen für Marine-Flugzeugführer und -Beobachter
- Honour Cross of the World War 1914/1918 with Swords in 1935
- Pilot's Badge (Wehrmacht)
- Wehrmacht Long Service Award, IV. and II. Class on 2 October 1936
- Repetition Clasp 1939 to the Iron Cross 1914, 2nd Class on 11 October 1939
- Iron Cross (1939), 1st Class on 11 June 1940
- Ehrenpokal der Luftwaffe in 1941
- Front Flying Clasp of the Luftwaffe for Bomber Pilots in Bronze and Silver
  - Bronze on 25 April 1941
  - Silver on 7 October 1943
- Narvik Shield on 12 May 1941
- German Cross in Gold on 24 November 1941 as Oberst in Kampfgeschwader 28
- Knight's Cross of the Iron Cross on 6 November 1943 as Generalmajor and Fliegerführer Nord
