= Pilot/Observer Badge =

Pilot/Observer Badge Flugzeugführer- und Beobachterabzeichen
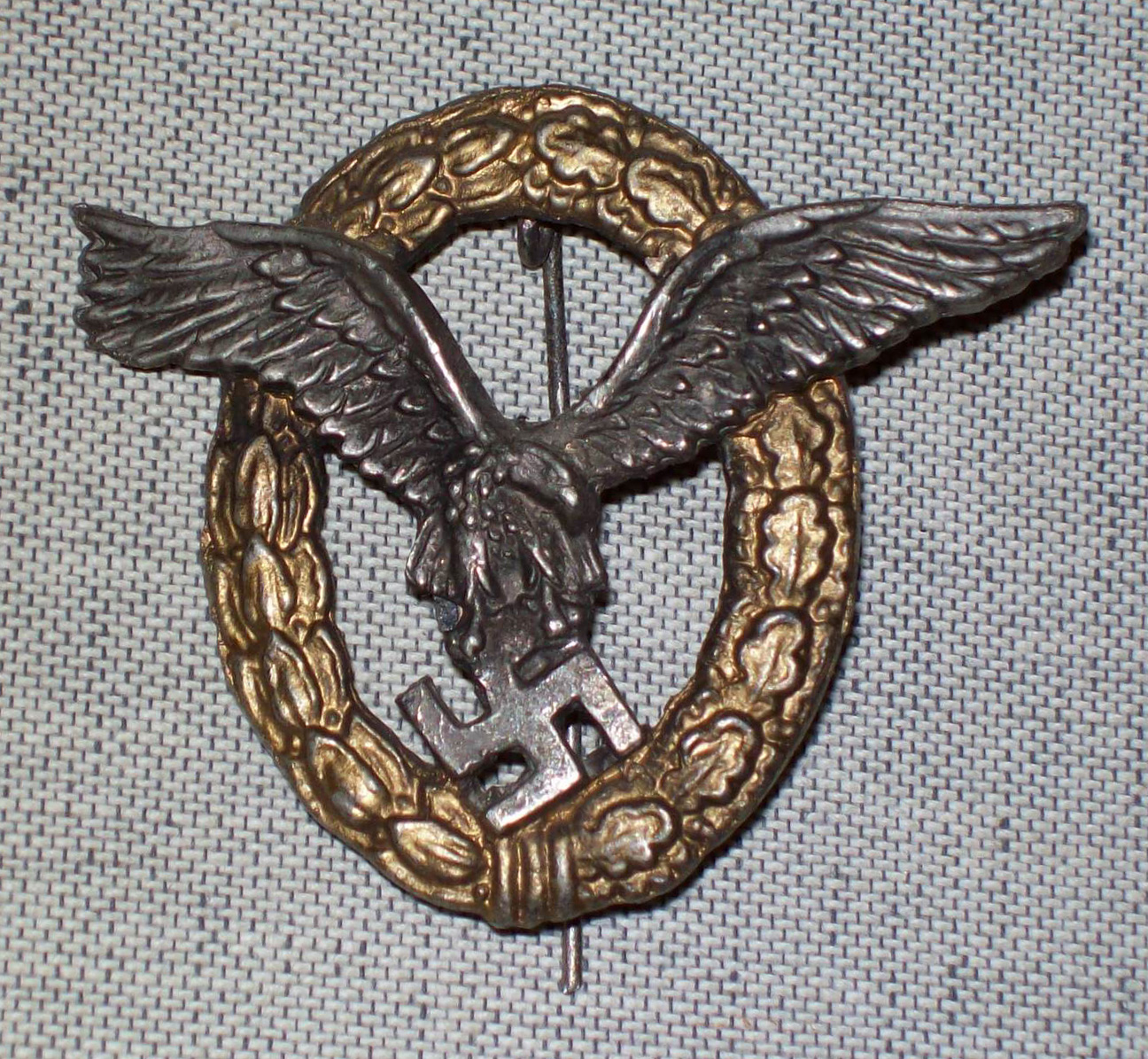
- Pilot/Observer Badge
- Type: Badge
- Awarded for: personnel who had already been awarded the Pilot's Badge and Observer Badge and honorary recipients
- Presented by: Nazi Germany
- Eligibility: Military personnel
- Campaign: World War II
- Status: Obsolete
- Established: 26 March 1936

The Pilot/Observer Badge (German: Flugzeugführer- und Beobachterabzeichen) was a World War II German military decoration awarded to Luftwaffe service personnel who had already been awarded the Pilot's Badge and Observer Badge. It was instituted on 26 March 1936 by the Commander in Chief of the Luftwaffe Hermann Göring. It was worn on the lower part of the left breast pocket of the service tunic, underneath the Iron Cross 1st Class if awarded. It was to replace the older 1933 Aircrew Badge.

The badge was originally manufactured in bronze, and later zinc. The badge can be distinguished from the Pilot's Badge by the gold wreath; the Pilot's Badge had a silver wreath. There was also a cloth version of the badge which used embroidered bullion for the officer's version and cotton for the NCO's version. The presentation case was dark blue, with a blue satin top liner and a blue velvet bottom liner on the inside.

== Badge in Gold with Diamonds ==
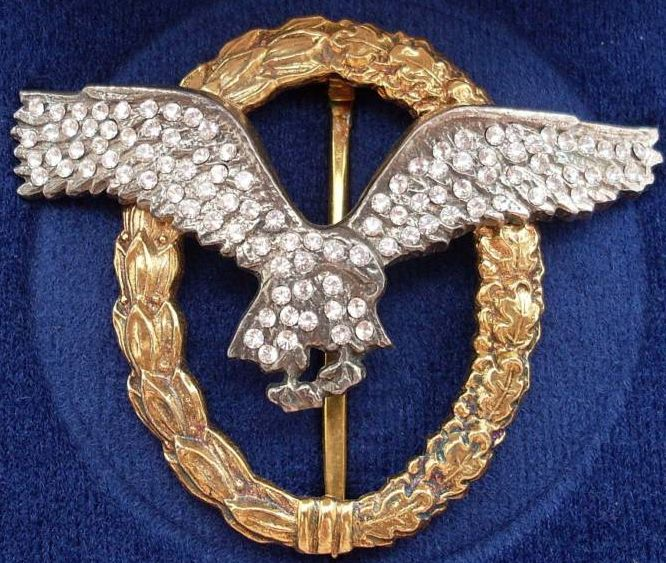
Denazified version

The exclusive variant of the Pilot/Observer Badge in Gold with Diamonds (German: Gemeinsame Flugzeugführer- und Beobachterabzeichen in Gold mit Brillanten). It was bestowed by Göring to honour exceptional achievement and on rare occasions as an honorary award. The first recipients were General Walther Wever, Chief of the Luftwaffe General Staff and General der Flieger Erhard Milch, State Secretary of the Reichsluftfahrtministerium on 11 November 1935.

Another variant of this award was presented to Flug-Kapitänin Hanna Reitsch. This variation was "more like a brooch". A horizontal "shaft" extended from each side of the wreath, which also had diamonds inlaid.

=== Recipients ===
==== Luftwaffe ====
- Reichsmarschall Hermann Göring
- General Walther Wever (Chief-of-General Staff Luftwaffe) - 11 November 1935
- General Erhard Milch (State Secretary of the Reichsluftfahrtministerium) - 11 November 1935
- General der Flieger Hugo Sperrle - 19 November 1937
- Major Werner Mölders - mid August 1940
- Major Helmut Wick
- Hautpmann Werner Baumbach - mid August 1940
- Major Adolf Galland - mid August 1940
- General Wolfram Freiherr von Richthofen - mid August 1940
- Generaloberst Kurt Student - 2 September 1941
- General der Flieger Friedrich Christiansen – fall of 1940
- General der Flieger Günther Korten (Chief of the Luftwaffe General Staff) - 1941 (for the Invasion of Crete)
- General der Flieger Josef Kammhuber
- Generaloberst Alexander Löhr - 1940
- Oberstleutnant Hans-Ulrich Rudel - summer of 1944
- Oberst Bernd von Brauchitsch (Chief adjudant of the Reichsmarschall) - summer 1944
- Hauptmann Erich Hartmann - August 1944
- Generalmajor Martin Harlinghausen - 17 April 1945
- Hauptmann Hans-Joachim Marseille
- Oberst Dietrich Peltz
- Generalfeldmarschall Robert Ritter von Greim
- Generalfeldmarschall Albert Kesselring
- Generaloberst Otto Dessloch
- Generalleutnant Karl Angerstein
- Oberst Walter Oesau - 17 October 1943
- Flug-Kapitänin Hanna Reitsch - March 1941
- Flug-Kapitänin Melitta Schenk Gräfin von Stauffenberg 1943
- Generaloberst Ernst Udet
- Oberst Nicolaus von Below
- Oberst Hajo Herrmann
- Generaloberst Alfred Keller

==== Honorary recipients ====
- Reichsführer-SS Heinrich Himmler - July 1942
- Großadmiral Karl Dönitz (Oberbefehlshaber der Kriegsmarine) - 1943
- SS-Sturmbannführer Otto Skorzeny - fall of 1944
- SS-Oberstgruppenführer and Generaloberst of the Waffen-SS Sepp Dietrich
- Generalfeldmarshall Erwin Rommel
- Generalfeldmarschall Erich von Manstein

==== Foreign recipients ====
- Carl Gustaf Emil Mannerheim (Marshal of Finland) - 1942
- Marschall Ion Antonescu (Prime Minister of Romania)
- Regent Miklós Horthy (Regent of Hungary)
- Italo Balbo (Italian aviator)
- Francisco Franco (Spanish dictator)
- Prince Regent Paul of Yugoslavia - 1939
- Benito Mussolini (Prime Minister of the Kingdom of Italy) - 1937
