= Prussian Military Pilot Badge =

Royal Prussian Military Pilot's Badge Königlich Preußisches Militär-Flugzeugführer-Abzeichen
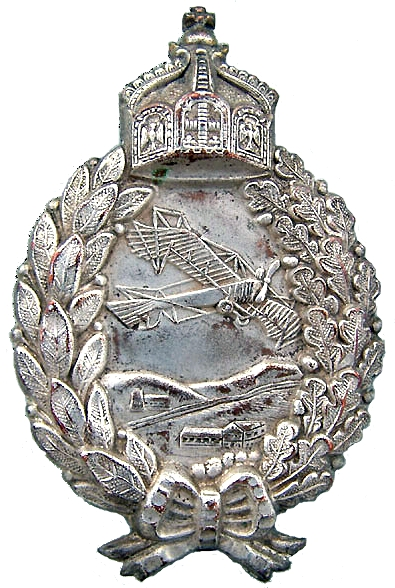
- Awarded for: Completion of Pilot Training
- Date: 1913–1920
- Country: Prussia; German Empire

The Royal Prussian Military Pilot's Badge (German: Königlich Preußisches Militär-Flugzeugführer-Abzeichen) was created by Kaiser Wilhelm II on January 27, 1913. It could be awarded to officers, non-commissioned officers and men who, after passing the two mandatory examinations for pilots and after completing their training at a military pilot station, acquired the certificate of competency as a military pilot.

These badges were made in different versions. The badges were made of silver, silver-plated non-ferrous metal and silver-plated iron. Due to the different manufacture and material, the size varies by 1 to 3 mm. Furthermore, half-sizes were made to clip on or for the medal clasp (size: 50 x 30 mm). Embroidered designs with metal thread are rare.

The oval badge shows a hilly landscape with buildings in the middle, over which an Etrich-Rumpler Taube is flying. It is surrounded by a wreath of oak leaves on the right side and laurel on the left and is topped by the German State Crown. The award was worn as a pin badge on the left side of the chest.

== Literature ==
- André Hüsken: Katalog der Orden, Ehrenzeichen und Auszeichnungen des Kurfürstentums Brandenburg, der Markgrafschaften Brandenburg-Ansbach und Brandenburg-Bayreuth, des Königreiches Preußen, der Republik Preußen unter Berücksichtigung des Deutschen Reiches. Band 3: Ehrenzeichen, Auszeichnungen und Ehrengaben 1888–1935. Hauschild, Bremen 2001, ISBN 3-89757-138-2
