= Airline pilot uniforms =

Airline pilot uniforms were introduced in the early 1930s by Pan American World Airways (Pan Am) at the beginning of the airline's Clipper era. At present, mainstream airline uniforms are somewhat standardized by the industry and widely used by airlines from the Americas, Europe, Asia, Australia and Africa, from small regional operators to large international companies.

== History ==
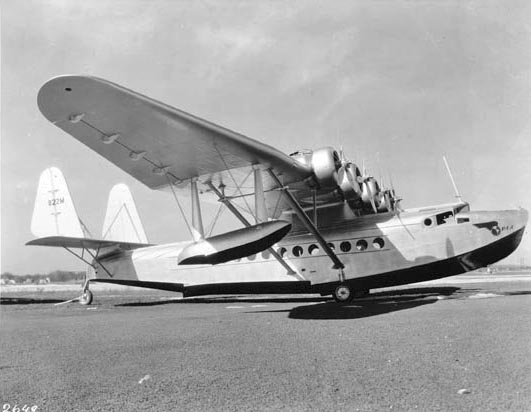
Pan Am Sikorsky S-42 Flying Boat

Before the 1930s, pilots wore clothing derived from military tradition established during World War I. At this time, military issued pilots very practical and comfortable flight crew clothing, which consisted of leather bomber jackets with oversized front pockets to allow easy access to charts, scarves to keep their necks protected from cockpit drafts, khaki trousers, either black shoes or boots, and soft leather helmets with pockets for intercom or radio headsets. Such attire was quickly adopted or, more frequently, transferred to the civil aviation sector by ex-military pilots who, during peace time, worked in air mail and cargo transport, flying light open cockpit aircraft.

Things began to change in 1931, when Pan Am inaugurated its South American routes using Sikorsky S-38 and S-40 flying boats carrying the names American Clipper, Southern Clipper, and Caribbean Clipper. They were the first of the series of 28 Clipper-named flying boats that came to symbolize Pan Am between 1931 and 1946. In 1937, Pan Am began seaplane services to Ireland, Britain and France from the United States. Six large, long-range Boeing 314 flying boats were delivered to Pan Am in early 1939. These enabled the commencement of a regular weekly transatlantic passenger and air mail service between the United States and Britain on June 24, 1939. Because Pan Am operated flying boats, the company decided to step away from the WWI military pilot look and dress its line pilots in an outfit closely resembling naval officer uniforms; the flight crews were just as much sea skippers as air pilots, and seeing a formally attired seafaring professional in the pilot seat allowed nervous passengers to feel more confident about the trip.

Therefore, pilots were issued black trousers, black double-breasted blazers, with sleeve braid loops on the lower sleeves denoting crew member rank, and white officer-style combination caps with either gold or silver insignia depicting either airline name or logo. Pan Am's success in the 1930s, and expansion in the 1950s, led to the establishment of one of the largest and most well-known world-class airlines. Many other operators, wishing to emulate Pan Am's success, adopted the slick look of the Pan Am pilot for their own crews.

== Uniform insignia ==
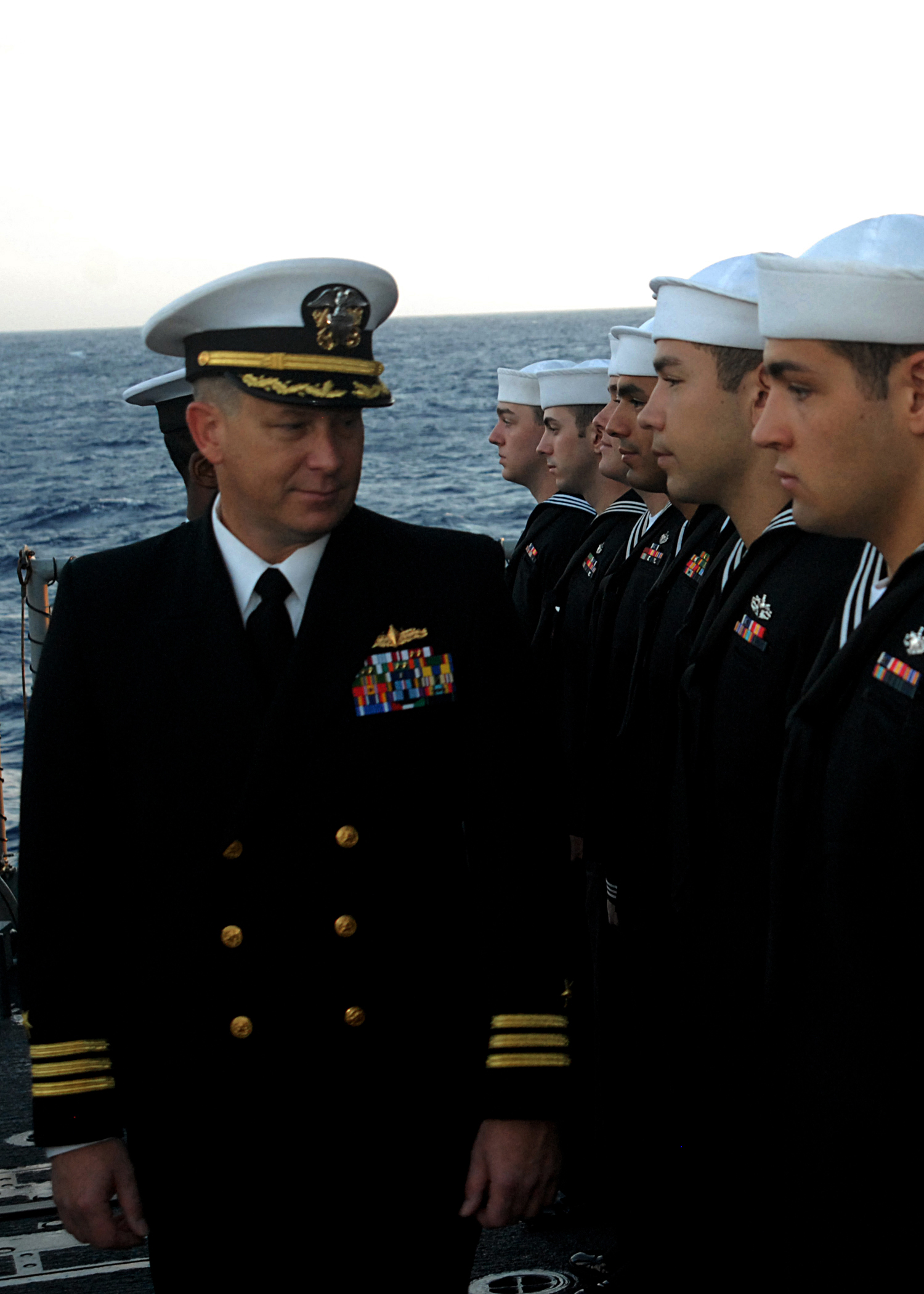
The Service Dress Blue uniform of US Navy officers, an example of the naval style that was copied by early airline pilot uniforms

Following the development of advanced and integrated cockpit systems since the late 1980s, airline pilots are mainly operating their respective aircraft on a dual-pilot basis. Most crews consist of 2 pilots, one of whom is the pilot-in-command, also called the captain, while the second pilot is commonly called the first officer. Cruise pilots, also known as "second officers", may be present on longer flights as relief pilots. These pilots are normally first officers in training and are only allowed to pilot aircraft outside of "critical flight phases" when the airplane is cruising above 20,000 feet.

Systems integration, and subsequent reduction in workload, have largely eliminated the need on passenger aircraft for additional crew members (also known as "ACM"), such as flight engineer, navigator, or radio operator. However, since some older airliners are now used for cargo transportation, such extended crews still exist.

Each crew member's uniform is decorated with insignia which, akin to naval uniforms, represents his or her duties on board the aircraft. The airline captain's insignia corresponds to the naval captain's insignia, such as four stripes on the shoulder epaulets and four stripes on the blazer sleeves. First officer's insignia corresponds to the naval commander uniform, bearing three stripes on shoulder epaulets and blazer sleeves. ACM insignia is similar to naval lieutenant's uniforms, with two stripes. (On some airlines, e.g. Ryanair, less experienced first officers will also wear two stripes.)

Pilots also typically wear a winged badge indicating their qualification to fly and their seniority. The color typically matches the sleeve stripe color, and the badge may be a metal pin or an embroidered patch. They generally follow the pattern of having the corporate logo in the center. For US-based carriers, a captain generally has a star enclosed in a laurel wreath on top, similar to a command pilot in the United States Air Force (USAF). A senior first officer has only a star, similar to a senior pilot in the USAF.

| Uniform item | Captain | First officer Flight engineer Additional crew member | Second officer | Trainee |
|---|---|---|---|---|
| Blazer/epaulets | | | | |
| Blazer/epaulets | 4 stripes | 3 stripes | 2 stripes | 1 stripe |
| Qualification badge | Wings with a star enclosed in a laurel wreath | Wings with a star | Wings | – |

Other versions:

| Captain | First officer Flight engineer Additional crew member | Second officer | Trainee |
|---|---|---|---|
| 4 stripes | 3 stripes | 2 stripes | 1 stripe |

In some airlines, senior captains who hold a certain number of flight hours or years of service in the company, a display a star above the four stripes.

== See also ==
- Aviator badge
- Pilot watch
