= Balloon Observer's Badge =

Balloon Observer's Badge Ballonbeobachterabzeichen
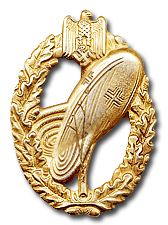
- Balloon Observer's Badge in Gold
- Type: Badge
- Awarded for: service as a balloon observer
- Presented by: Nazi Germany
- Eligibility: Military personnel
- Campaign: World War II
- Status: Obsolete
- Established: 8 July 1944

The Balloon Observer's Badge (German: Ballonbeobachterabzeichen) was a military decoration of Nazi Germany during World War II. It was awarded to German Army personnel who operated gas balloons flying them 300 ft (91 m)-500 ft (152 m) above the ground. The balloons were easy targets for Allied pilots and ground fire. Due to its late introduction, only a very small number of badges were awarded.

The die-struck badge features a laurel wreath of oak leaves and acorns surmounted by the national eagle grasping a swastika. Below this is a representation of an observation balloon. The Balloon Observer's Badge had three grades based on a point system: Bronze (20 points); Silver (45 points) and Gold (75 points).

Points were awarded for particular conditions, such as the difficulty and success of a mission. There is no record of the gold version ever being awarded. Recommendation for the award was rendered by a commanding officer of either the observer unit, artillery unit or army unit.
