= WINGS Pilot Proficiency Program =

Recurring flight training initiative in the United States

The new three pins offered by the FAA for the program

The WINGS Pilot Proficiency Program is a voluntary pilot training and safety initiative supported by the FAA Safety Team (stylized FAASTeam) division of the Federal Aviation Administration in the United States. The program was created by advisory circular AC 61.91 on May 21, 1979 (46 years ago) as the Pilot Proficiency Award Program, and it has been continuously developed to promote air safety by encouraging general aviation pilots to maintain flying proficiency through the use of online learning, in-person seminars, and tailored flight training.

Enrollment in the program is free to all pilots in the United States; successful completion of each "level" grants members a set of metal aviator wings in addition to credit for the flight review normally mandated by 14 C.F.R. § 61.56.

The program features two aspects: knowledge and flight. The knowledge portion presents online courses to maintain or increase an airman's knowledge. The courses are at a quality level found in college, air carrier or military education presentations. The flight portion provides an opportunity to practice and perform selected maneuvers to the standards found in the FAA Flight Test Guide for the certificate level you hold or choose to exercise. (Example: A retired airline pilot with an Airline Transport Pilot certificate may elect to perform at the Private Pilot level for the purposes of satisfying the Wings Program requirements.)

== Program structure ==
=== Proficiency levels ===
- Basic
- Advanced—For those who wish to maintain a higher level of proficiency than required by the Basic level.
- Master—For those who wish to maintain the highest level of proficiency.

== Background and history ==
In the United States, initial pilot certification is structured around highly-specific sets of criteria known as Airman Certification Standards (formerly Practical Test Standards). While professional pilots and military aviators are subjected to frequent and standardized recurrent training, general aviation pilots are only required to complete a generic and unspecified biennial requirement of 1 hour of ground instruction and 1 hour of flight instruction in accordance with 14 C.F.R. § 61.56. In 1977, the FAA's Central Region (overseeing Kansas, Nebraska, Iowa, and Missouri) developed a local program aimed at curbing an increasing trend of aircraft accidents attributed to pilot error. By using recurrent training to focus pilots' attention on common contributing factors, the new "Pilot Proficiency Program" hoped to actively promote air safety.

=== Legacy program ===
Phase 1 pin (discontinued design)

Phase 2 pin (discontinued design)

As laid out in Advisory Circular 61-91H, (obsolete, superseded by AC61-91J) the program formerly offered twenty phases for a twenty-year recurrent training opportunity. Participants were eligible for more wings every year after earning their first set, each added set marking progress.

From the program's inception in 1996 until 2007, each of the first 10 phases of the program awarded a pin and a certificate.

- Phase 1 wings are plain bronze color.
- Phase 2 wings are silver color with a star added.
- Phase 3 wings are gold color with a star and wreath.
- Phase 4 wings are gold tone and have a simulated ruby mounted in the shield.
- Phase 5 wings are gold tone with a rhinestone mounted in the shield.
- Phase 6 wings are gold tone with a simulated sapphire mounted in the shield.
- Phase 7, 8, and 9 wings are gold tone with the appropriate Roman numeral displayed within the wreath.
- Phase 10 wings are bright gold tone with the Roman numeral X and shield located within a ring of 10 stars.

Past phase 10, only a certificate is awarded.

Seaplane pilots who specify “seawings” on the proficiency award application get a distinctive set of seawings.

=== 2007 update ===
The original Wings program was updated in 2007. It was replaced by a new program from the new FAA. This new program attempts to provide better standards for pilots getting flight reviews and training, adding the most common causes of accidents into the curriculum and providing set standards for maneuvers, instead of giving a minimum flight time to complete.

While the FAA does provide pins for completion of a level of the new Wings program under the updated program, it has entered into a partnership with aviation insurer Avemco where is announced that Avemco will continue to sponsor the WINGS Pilot Proficiency Program by supplying all WINGS participants with WINGS lapel pins upon program completion. The FAA does, however, intend to keep track of a pilot's recurrent training and will be able to remind the pilot by e-mail if their training is close to expiring, requiring them to get a new flight review or complete another Wings course via a website link.

On 24 September 2010 the program was further updated to include specific recognition for those sea-rated pilots who complete a phase of WINGS in a seaplane or amphibian plane. The Seaplane Pilots Association agreed to send a lapel pin to these pilots, and some insurance companies have started to offer "significant premium discounts" to members of the Association who complete a phase of WINGS in a seaplane.

Some WINGS credit activities have incorporated helicopter-specific safety material developed by partner organisations. FAASTeam online notices and webinars periodically republish or highlight U.S. Helicopter Safety Team (USHST) monthly safety reports and topical seminars for rotorcraft pilots, allowing those events to count toward WINGS proficiency requirements while disseminating helicopter-focused safety messages to a broader general aviation audience.

== See also ==
- List of aviation awards
