= Seaplane Pilots Association =

Organization

- Founded: 1972
- Type: Not for profit
- Headquarters: Winter Haven, Florida, United States
- Field: Aviation advocacy
- Members: 7,950 (2005)
- Website: www.seaplanes.org

The Seaplane Pilots Association (SPA) is a Winter Haven, Florida-based American non-profit political organization that advocates for seaplane aviation.

The association was founded by David Quam, Robert Murray, Al Lisch and William Hooper in 1972. The founding purpose of the Association was to protect seaplane access to public waters, promote seaplane flying and publish a member Newsletter and Seaplane Base Directory. SPA states that its mission is, "to be the voice of the seaplane community and to represent the interests of seaplane enthusiasts on the federal, state, and local levels. It includes ensuring fairness and equality for seaplanes to share public waterways with all other user groups. Other key elements of our Mission include Safety, Education, and Environmental Stewardship."

With corporate headquarters in Winter Haven, Florida, SPA has established a network of Field Directors in every region of the U.S. and Canada who serve to coordinate the group's efforts and interface with local authorities and infrastructure.

== Publications ==
The primary publication of the Seaplane Pilots Association is WaterFlying Magazine. It is the only nationally-published seaplane magazine in the world.

For active pilots, SPA also publishes the Water Landing Directory, the nation's only resource for waterway regulations. The directory contains waterway information, access regulations, shore side facilities, trip planning, and more.

== Programs ==
In addition to its advocacy and education mission, SPA has two other major programs.

- SPA Foundation, is SPA's 501(c)(3) charitable organization. It provides a platform to earn grant funding, and provides for education and scholarship programs.
- SPA Scholarship, is a program to award flight training scholarships for pilots to attain their commercial seaplane rating. Applicants must be between 17 and 35, have at least a private pilot license, and be an SPA member. Depending on funding, SPA offers up to 12 scholarships a year.

== See also ==
- Aircraft Owners and Pilots Association – Similar organization established for general aviation.
- Experimental Aircraft Association – Similar organization focused on homebuilt aircraft
