= Aircrew Badge (Nazi) =

Aircrew Badge Fliegerschaftsabzeichen
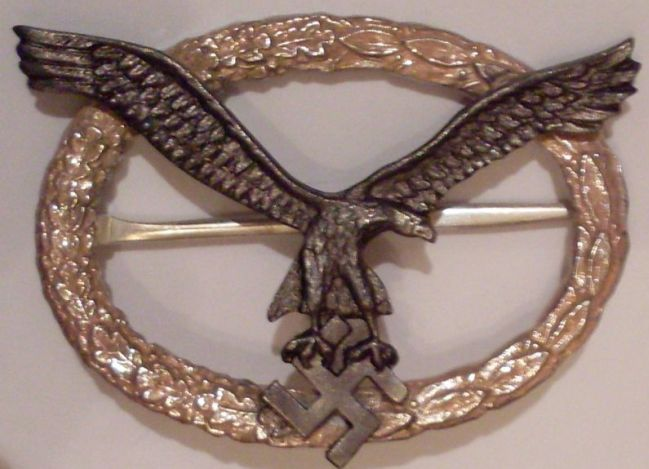
- Type: Badge
- Presented by: Nazi Germany
- Eligibility: Military personnel
- Established: 1933
- First award: 1933
- Final award: prior to March 1936

The Aircrew Badge (German: Fliegerschaftsabzeichen) was a German military decoration awarded to members of the German Air Sports Association (Deutscher Luftsportverband or DLV e. V.), an organisation set up by the Nazi Party in March 1933 to establish a uniform basis for the training of military pilots. The German Air Sports Association was a cover organization for the future German Air Force (Luftwaffe). Its chairman was the future Commander in Chief of the Luftwaffe Hermann Göring and its vice-chairman Ernst Röhm. Since the Treaty of Versailles officially forbade Germany from building fighter planes of any sort, the German Air Sports Association used gliders to train men who were still officially civilians for the future Luftwaffe. It was the first qualification badge recognized by the Luftwaffe.

== Description ==
The badge came into existence in 1933. To be placed on the lower part of the left breast pocket, it was worn by pilots and observers. It had the national eagle clutching a Nazi swastika at the top and a wreath around the outside rim. The left side of the wreath was composed of oak leaves and the right side of laurel leaves. The wreath pattern was reversed in 1935. The badge was made of silver and was grey in appearance.

The Aircrew Badge became the official Pilot/Observer Badge for the Luftwaffe on 19 January 1935. However, it was replaced by a newer Pilot/Observer Badge instituted by Göring in 1936. The original badge was then removed from circulation and retired. For that reason, it is considered a rare badge of the Luftwaffe.
