= Glider Pilot Badge =

Glider Pilot's Badge Segelflugzeugführerabzeichen
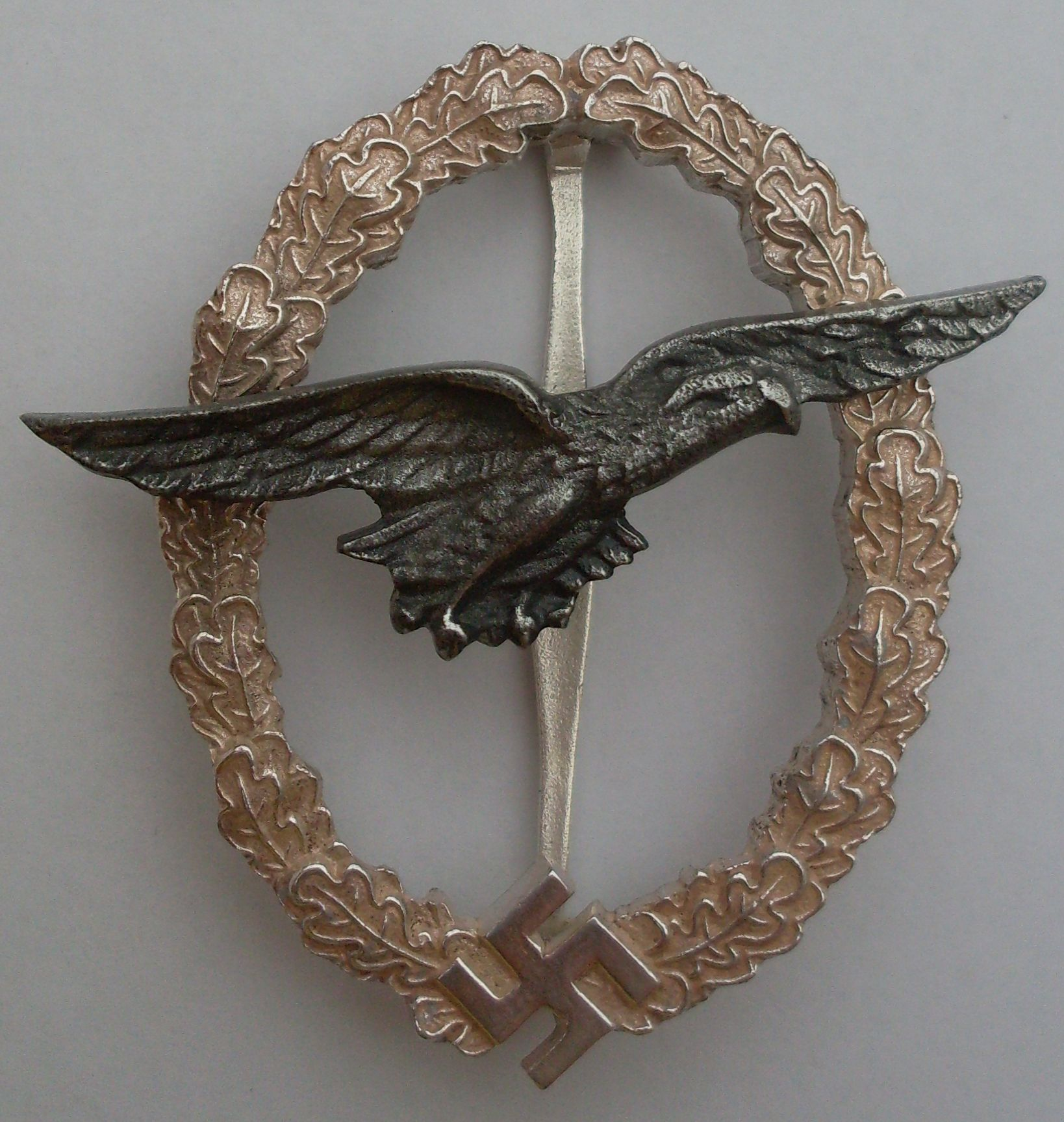
- Type: Badge
- Presented by: Nazi Germany
- Eligibility: Military personnel
- Campaign: World War II
- Established: 1940
- First award: 1942

The Glider Pilot's Badge (German: Segelflugzeugführerabzeichen) was a German military decoration that was awarded during World War II to military pilot's who were members of the German Air Force (Luftwaffe) after they completed their glider training. Honorably discharged personnel who met the requirements could also be awarded the badge. A citation was issued with the awarded badge. It was worn on or right below the left breast tunic pocket.

== Description ==
The badge was approved in 1940 and first issued in 1942. It was made by C. E. Juncker in Berlin. The badge was oval in shape and had a silver oakleaf wreath around the outside. The middle of the wreath had a dark "oxidized" national eagle in flight. A Nazi swastika was at the bottom middle of the outside wreath. Originally made of aluminum, however, in the latter stages of World War II it was made of metal alloy. The badge measured 42mm wide by 55mm high and the wingspan of the eagle's wings in the middle was 53mm. There was also a cloth version of the badge which could be worn by officers and NCOs. The presentation case was dark blue, with a blue satin top liner and a blue velvet bottom liner on the inside.
