= Air Gunner Badge =

Air Gunner's and Flight Engineer's badge Fliegerschützenabzeichen für Bordschützen und Bordmechaniker
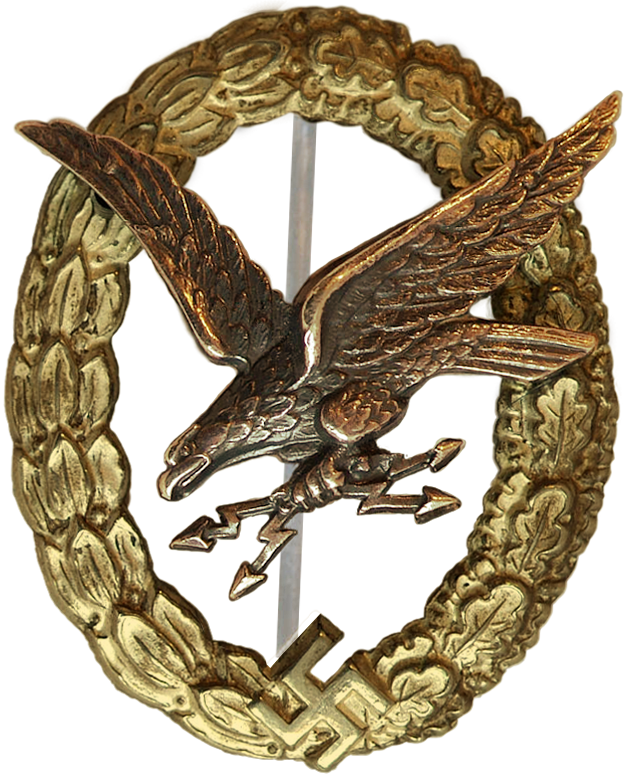
- Type: Badge
- Presented by: Nazi Germany
- Eligibility: Military personnel
- Campaign: World War II
- Established: 1942
- First award: 1942
- Final award: 1945

The Air Gunner's and Flight Engineer's badge (German: Fliegerschützenabzeichen für Bordschützen und Bordmechaniker) was a German military decoration awarded to air gunners, mechanics (flight engineers) or aircrew meteorologists who were members of the German Air Force (Luftwaffe) after they completed two months training or had taken part in at least five operational flights. If one was wounded during an operational flight, the badge could be awarded earlier. For Luftwaffe members who were air gunners and mechanics (flight engineers) this badge replaced an earlier separate badge which had been introduced back in 1935. The qualifications for the two badges were the same for recipients.

== Description ==
The badge came into existence on 22 June 1942. It was to be placed on the lower part of the left breast side of the tunic, below the Iron Cross. The badge was oval in shape and had a silver-plated outside wreath around the rim. The middle of the wreath had a national eagle in flight. The polished eagle was also silver-plated but made of "oxidized old-silver" giving it a different shade of color than the polished wreath. The right side of the wreath was composed of laurel leaves and the left side of oak leaves. A Nazi swastika was at the bottom middle of the outside wreath. The badge was originally made of aluminum, however, in the latter stages of World War II it was made of aluminum, zinc or metal alloy. There was also a cloth version of the badge which could be worn on a flight jacket.

An earlier separate decoration known as the Radio Operator and Air Gunner's badge was introduced previously in 1935. It was awarded after a radio operator, air gunner or mechanic (flight engineer) completed the same criteria which was required for this badge. The difference between this 1942 badge with the prior 1935 badge is that the in-flight national eagle was not clutching in its claws the two crossed arrow-head lightning bolts which represented the radio operator.
