= Radio Operator Badge =

Radio Operator & Air Gunner's Badge Luftwaffen-Fliegerschützen-Bordfunker-und Bordmechanikerabzeichen
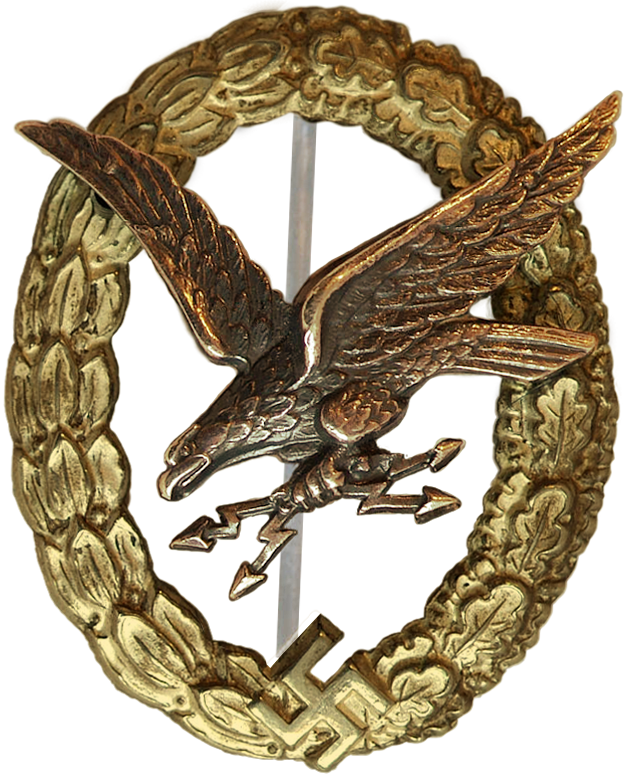
- Type: Badge
- Presented by: Nazi Germany
- Eligibility: Military personnel
- Campaign: World War II
- Established: 1935
- First award: 1935
- Final award: prior to June 1942

The Radio Operator & Air Gunner's Badge (German: Fliegerschützenabzeichen für Bordfunker) is a commonly accepted title for the Luftwaffen-Fliegerschützen-Bordfunker-und Bordmechanikerabzeichen (Combined Air Gunner, Radio Operator and Flight Engineer Badge). It was a German military decoration awarded to radio operators, air gunners, and mechanics (flight engineers) who were members of the German Air Force (Luftwaffe). This is given after they completed two months training or had taken part in at least five operational flights. If wounded during an operational flight, the badge could be awarded and worn earlier. Later in June 1942, a separate badge was introduced for air gunners and flight engineers. That badge had the same qualifications.

== Description ==
The badge came into existence in 1935. It was to be worn on the lower section of the left breast side of the tunic, below the Iron Cross. The badge was oval in shape and had a silver-plated outside wreath around the rim. The middle of the wreath had a national eagle "flying from left to right in a downwards direction"; clutched in its claws were two crossed arrow-head lightning bolts. The polished eagle was also silver-plated, but made of "oxidized old-silver" giving it a different shade of color than the polished wreath. The right side of the wreath was composed of laurel leaves and the left side of oak leaves. A Nazi swastika was at the bottom middle of the outside wreath. The badge was originally made of aluminum. However, it was made only of a simple metal alloy during the latter stages of World War II. There was a cloth version of the badge for Luftwaffe N.C.O.'s. The officer's cloth version was made of "silver bullion".

On 22 June 1942, a separate Air Gunner's and Flight Engineer's badge (German: Fliegerschützenabzeichen für Bordschützen und Bordmechaniker) was introduced. It was awarded after an air gunner, mechanic (flight engineer), or aircrew meteorologist completed the same criteria which was required for this badge.
