= Flyer's Commemorative Badge =

Flyer's Commemorative Badge Flieger-Erinnerungsabzeichen
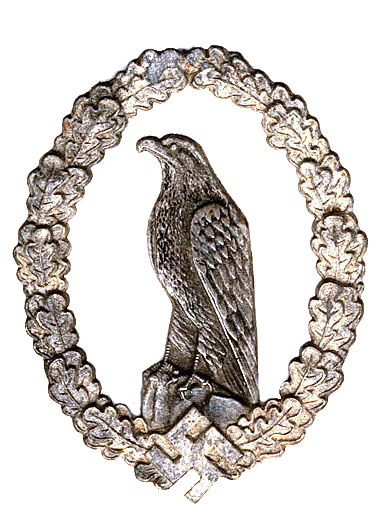
- Type: Badge
- Presented by: Nazi Germany
- Eligibility: Military personnel
- Established: 1936
- First award: 1936
- Final award: prior to September 1939

The Flyer's Commemorative Badge (German: Flieger-Erinnerungsabzeichen) was a German military decoration awarded to active and reserve personnel who had been honorably discharged from flying duties. Luftwaffe (air force) personnel qualified for the badge after having served as flyers for four years during World War I or had been honorably discharged after 15 years of flight duty service. However, one could also qualify for the badge if they became disabled due to a flying accident. If one was killed during the course of his flying duties, the badge was given to their next of kin. The badge is commonly known as the "Retired Aircrew Badge". It was awarded prior to 1 September 1939, the start of World War II in Europe. It is considered one of the most rare flying qualification awards.

== Description ==
The badge came into existence on 26 March 1936. It was to be placed on the lower left breast side of the tunic. It was oval in shape with an outside wreath of oak leaves around each side of the rim in polished silver and a Nazi swastika at the base. At the center of the badge was an eagle "perched" atop a boulder with its wings folded down. This part of the badge was oxidized silver, which gave it a grey appearance in color. The badge measured 54mm by 42mm, being originally produced in nickel silver. Then in 1937, it was produced in aluminum. There are two variations, with one produced with the area around the eagle's legs being solid and another where that same area is cut-out. It was struck in one piece and made by C. E. Juncker. A cloth version was also produced and could be worn on civilian clothes.
