= Cuff title =

Military insignia

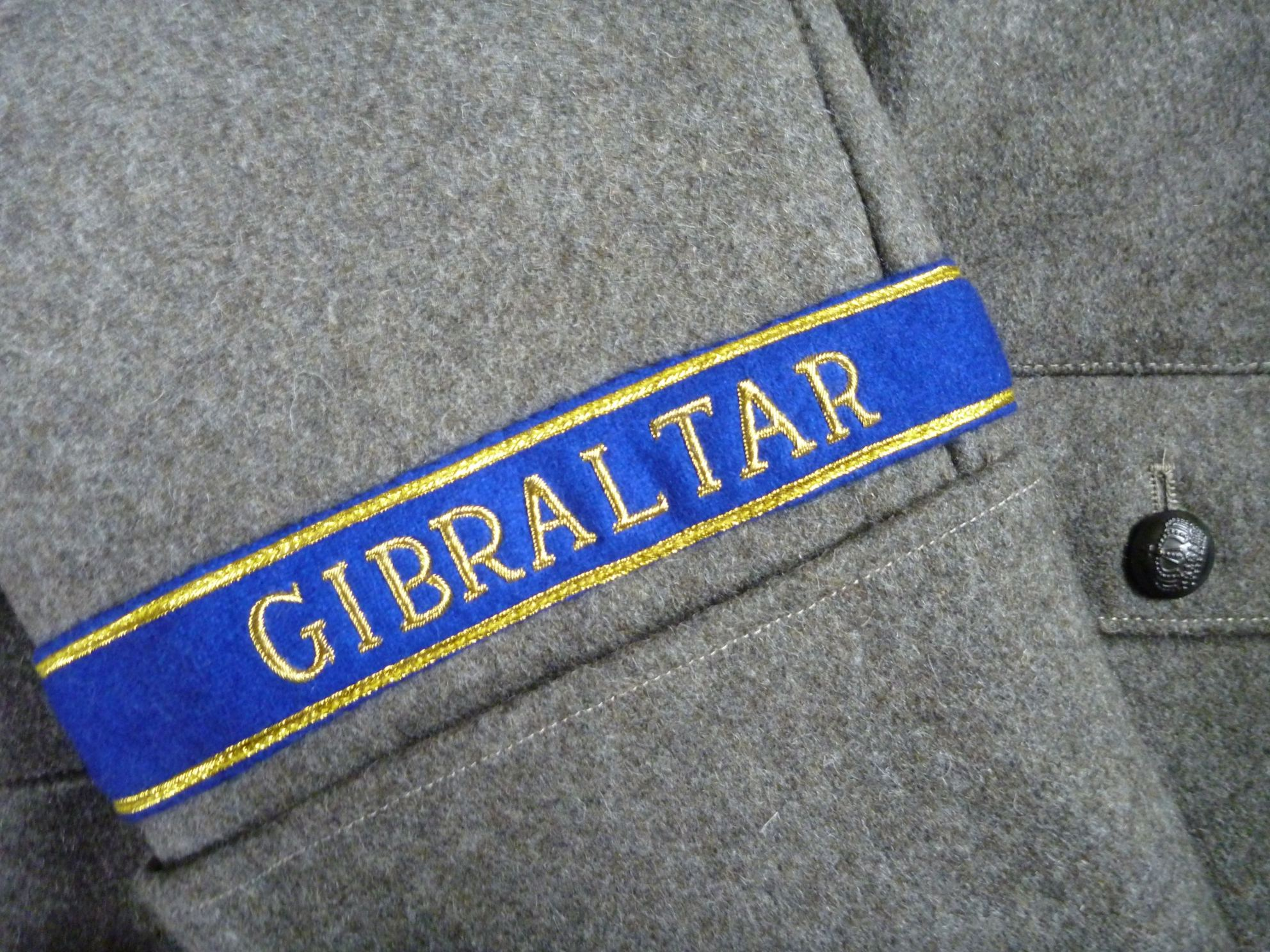
A Imperial German Army "Gibraltar" cuff title. The title was initially awarded by George III to Hanoverian Army troops which fought in the Great Siege of Gibraltar; Wilhelm II renewed the cuff title in 1901.

The cuff title (German: Ärmelstreifen) is a form of commemorative or affiliation insignia placed on the sleeve, near the cuff, of German military and paramilitary uniforms. The tradition can be traced back to the foundation of the "Gibraltar" cuff title, which was authorised in 1783 by George III for Hanoverian Army troops which fought in the Great Siege of Gibraltar during the American Revolutionary War. Cuff titles are often associated with the Second World War and units of the Waffen SS but were widely used by all branches of the German military, including paramilitary and civilian organizations.

== Description ==
Image of the Latin script "Großdeutschland" cuff title introduced in 1944. This was a uniform insignia of the Panzergrenadier Division "Großdeutschland", an elite combat unit of the army of Nazi Germany that fought on the Eastern Front in World War II.

The base portion of a cuff title is made of either wool, cotton, rayon or a cotton/rayon mix. It is approximately 4 cm (1.6 inches) wide and bears a name or symbol that identifies the wearer belonging to a particular unit or has served in a specific campaign. Machine woven cuff titles became more common as the second world war progressed and newer titles were introduced. The colors of the fabric as well as the lettering varied. The cuff titles of the Waffen-SS, the combat branch of the paramilitary SS organisation of Nazi Germany, reflected the colours of the SS (black and silver) and were generally black in colour with grey or white lettering.

Lettering could be in Latin, Gothic or Sütterlin style script, as shown on the Grossdeutschland cuff title. Block letters were also used.

== Types ==
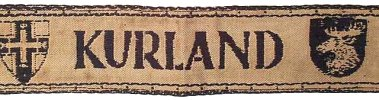
The "Courland" campaign cuff title (Ärmelband Kurland in German) was a military decoration of Nazi Germany awarded to soldiers of Army Group Courland who fought in the Courland Pocket during World War II.

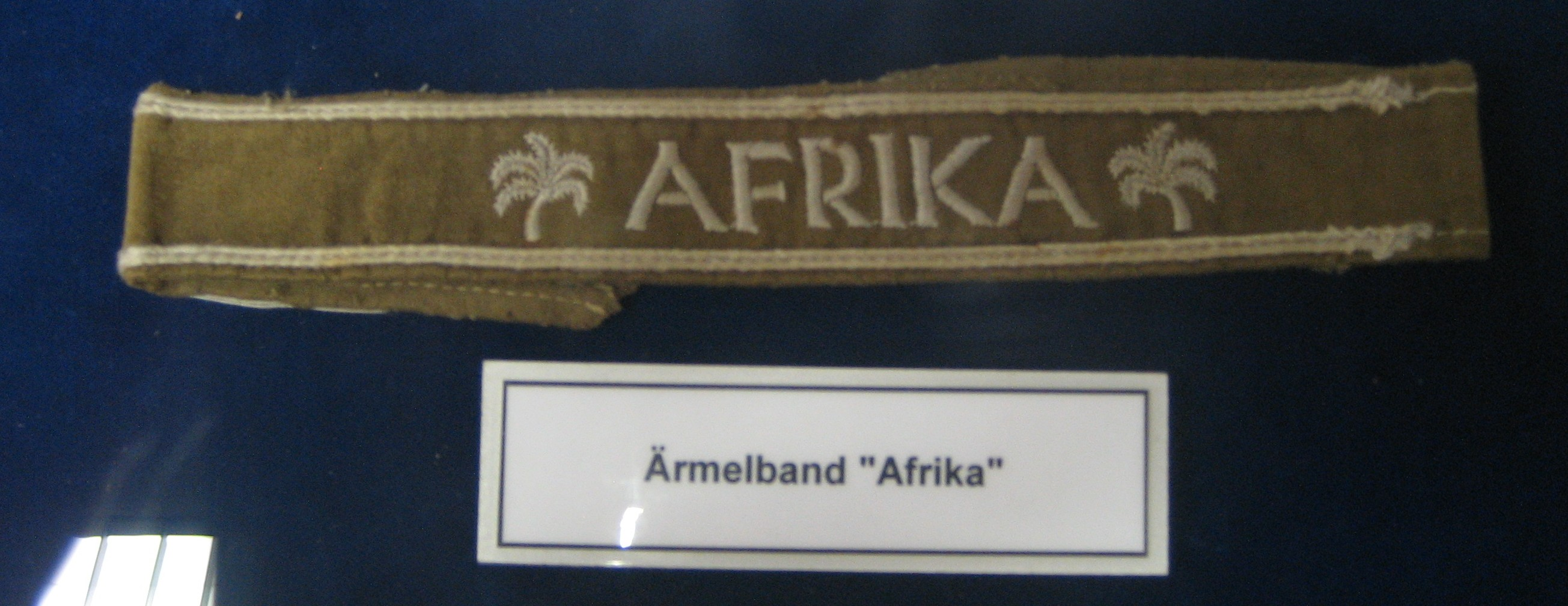
The "Afrika" campaign cuff band (Ärmelband Afrika) was awarded to soldiers who took part in Nazi Germany's North African campaign of 1941–43.

- Unit Cuff Titles – These generally referred to the name of a division, although some regiments also had distinctive titles.
- The Allgemeine or General SS, the paramilitary corps of the German Nazis, manufactured the largest amount in variations of cuff bands from Standarten to Oberabschnitte - see Allgemeine-SS regional commands - Ref: Ian Blanthorn
- Branch of Service Cuff Titles – These identified those who served in a specific branch of service like the military police and war correspondents. The cuff title of the Feldgendarmerie (Military Police) wore a distinctive cuff title, often in conjunction with a unit cuff title, if entitled.

Both were named Ärmelstreifen. To differentiate it, there was another cuff title, named Ärmelband, which was used for

- Campaign Cuff Titles – a total of four were authorised during the Second World War to reward participation in the campaigns in Crete, Africa, Metz and Courland.

There are several patterns of cuff titles known to have been used; some units had several unique patterns. Among the more interesting designs were:

- The British Free Corps had a cuff title in block Gothic script with the name of the unit in English.
- The "Afrikakorps" cuff title was worn informally as a campaign title until replaced with an "Afrika" cuff title bearing that name as well as depictions of palm trees.
- The 3rd SS Division Totenkopf had a version of their cuff title that was only a skull and crossbones design.
- The 1st SS Division Leibstandarte SS Adolf Hitler had "Adolf Hitler" written on their cuff title in the German Sütterlin script. Contrary to a common belief, the design did not bear any resemblance to Adolf Hitler's signature.

== Method of wear ==
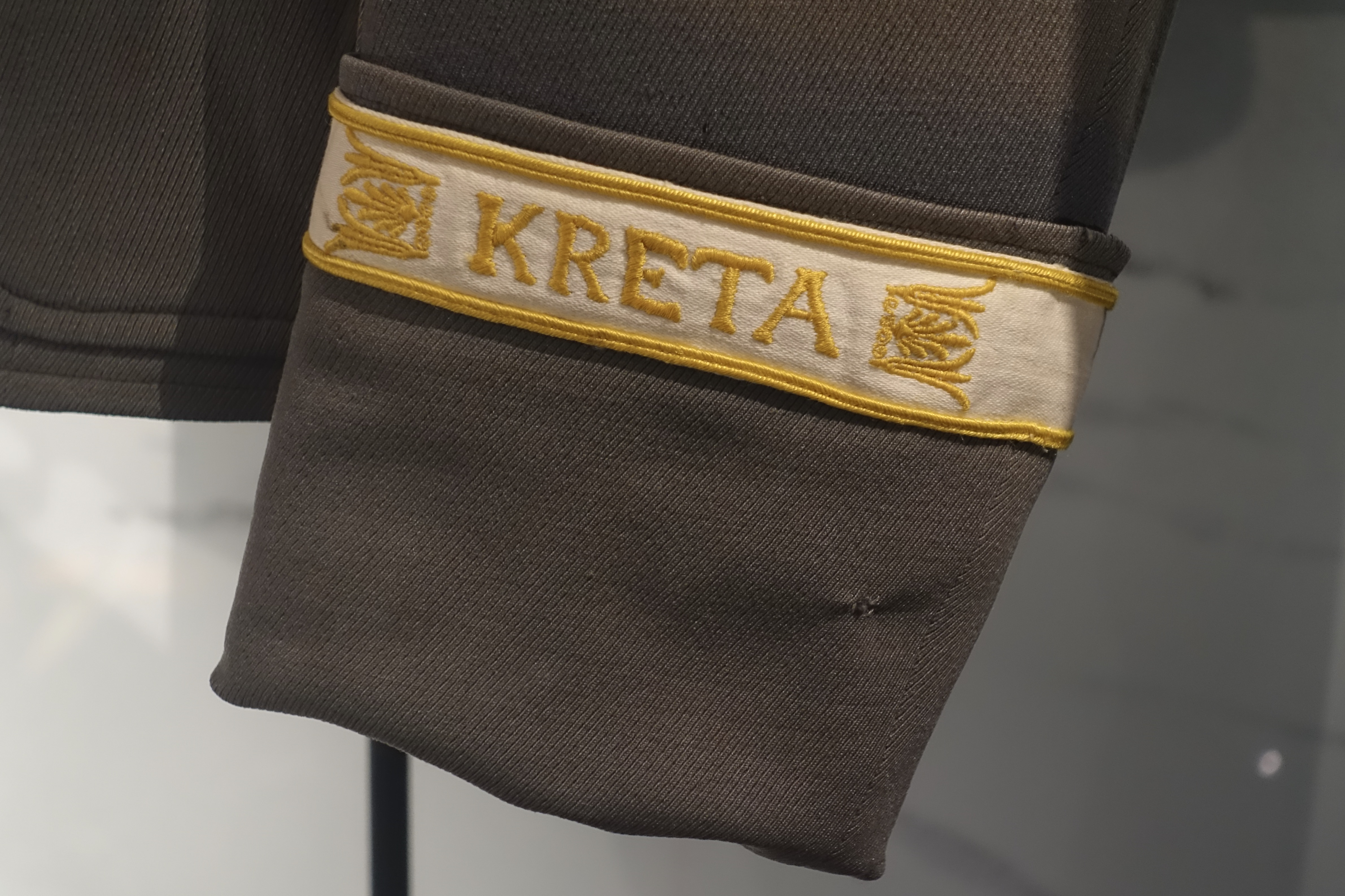
Position of the cuff title. The Crete Cuff Title (Ärmelband Kreta) was a World War II German military decoration awarded to Wehrmacht servicemen who took part in the battle of Crete 1941.

As worn on Second World War uniforms, the bottom edge of German cuff titles were generally placed at the top of the split seam of a jacket cuff. This is how the measurement of 14.5 cm to 15 cm (5.7 to 5.9 inches) came about, because the split seam of the sleeve of a German enlisted man's field blouse is approximately 14.5 cm. The Germans had no defined measurement in their regulations as to how high the cuff title went, just that it was to be placed alongside the cuff's split seam. Wartime photographic evidence exists of jackets with the cuff title placed lower than 14.5 cm to 15 cm from the cuff edge. This is usually due to a reduced sleeve length. On jackets with a French cuff (the cuff turned back), the cuff title was placed above the cuff if it was an Army (Heer), Air force (Luftwaffe), or Navy (Kriegsmarine) uniform, and placed just below the cuff edge on the cuff itself on SS jackets (usually between the edge of the cuff and the seam of the cuff's edge, approximately 1 mm to 1.5 mm).

The San -Abt cuff titles were worn on the black tunics with Roman / Arabic numerals denoting the unique Allgemeine SS Abschnitt. These cuff titles are from the collection of military historian Ian F Blanthorn.

In the Bundeswehr the cuff title are worn at the cuff on both sides.

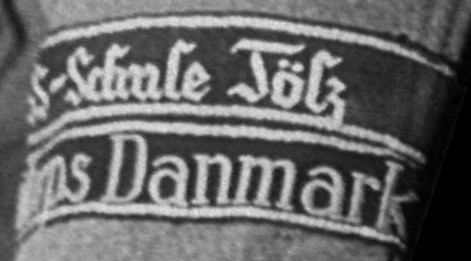
Wearing two cuff titles; SS-Schule Tölz (SS-Junkerschule Bad Tölz) and Frikorps Danmark

In the Army, Air force or Navy the unit cuff title was, in tradition with the regranted GIBRALTAR cuff title, worn on the right arm. In the SS the cuff title was worn on the left arm. All campaign cuff titles were worn on the left arm. For example; someone who was in the army and fought in North Africa and later transferred to Grossdeutschland had an "Afrika" campaign cuff title on their left arm and their Grossdeutschland cuff title on their right arm (General Manteuffel's leather coat was an anomaly to this rule). An SS soldier who fought in Crete as a paratrooper and later joined 2nd SS Division Das Reich would have both of his cuff titles on the left arm. In this case one would usually see the unit cuff title placed below the campaign cuff title because the chances are that the individual received his jacket with his unit cuff title beforehand and then had his campaign cuff title affixed after the fact, but this was not always the case.

More than one title could be worn if the soldier was entitled. General Manteuffel wore the "Afrika" campaign cuff title above his Grossdeutschland cuff title during the period he commanded that division. Unit cuff titles were not granted as a mark of prior service in the same manner that divisional patches were and continues to be worn on the right sleeve of US Army uniforms. However, members who were entitled to wear a unit cuff title, who were also military policemen, combat correspondents, or members of the Führerhauptquartier (Hitler's headquarters), could wear both their unit's cuff title and the cuff title of their specialty service. An example of this would be a military policeman in the 17th SS Division "Götz von Berlichingen", who would or could wear both this SS-Feldgendarmerie (SS Military Police) cuff title and his Götz von Berlichingen cuff title. In this specific case, they would both be worn on the left arm. Soldiers sent to schools also wore the school's cuff over that of the unit, if any.

== Status ==
Cuff titles were considered a special honour. The book The History of the Panzerkorps Grossdeutschland by Helmuth Spaeter describes an instance in which the motorcycle company of the Infantry Regiment "Grossdeutschland" was held to account for losing a position; they were forbidden from wearing their cuff titles until they had earned the privilege back by success in a later battle.

When Waffen SS divisions failed to perform satisfactorily near Vienna in April 1945, Adolf Hitler ordered the units involved to remove their cuff titles as a punishment. SS-Oberstgruppenführer Sepp Dietrich was enraged, and reportedly sent his own back to Berlin in a night vase (chamber pot).

Soldiers in training were usually presented the cuff title only on completion of that training, and the award of the title was seen as a rite of passage. This rite is described in the book The Forgotten Soldier.

== Post World War II ==
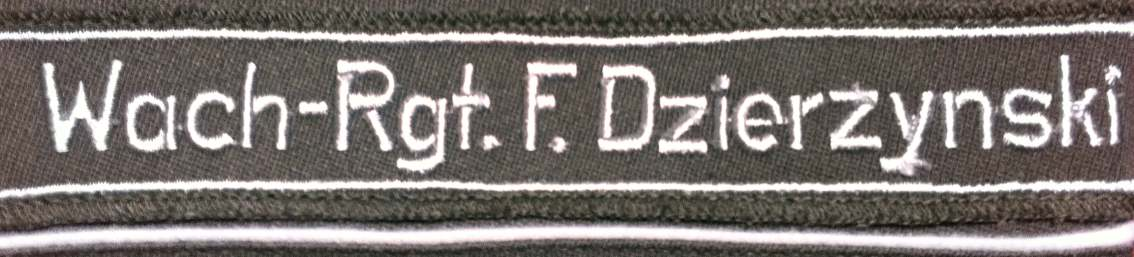
Cuff title of the DDR Wachregiment "Feliks E. Dzierzynski".

The East German Nationale Volksarmee continued the tradition of cuff titles, most notably worn by Border Guards and Guard Regiments named after famous German communists and Personalities of the Eastern Bloc.

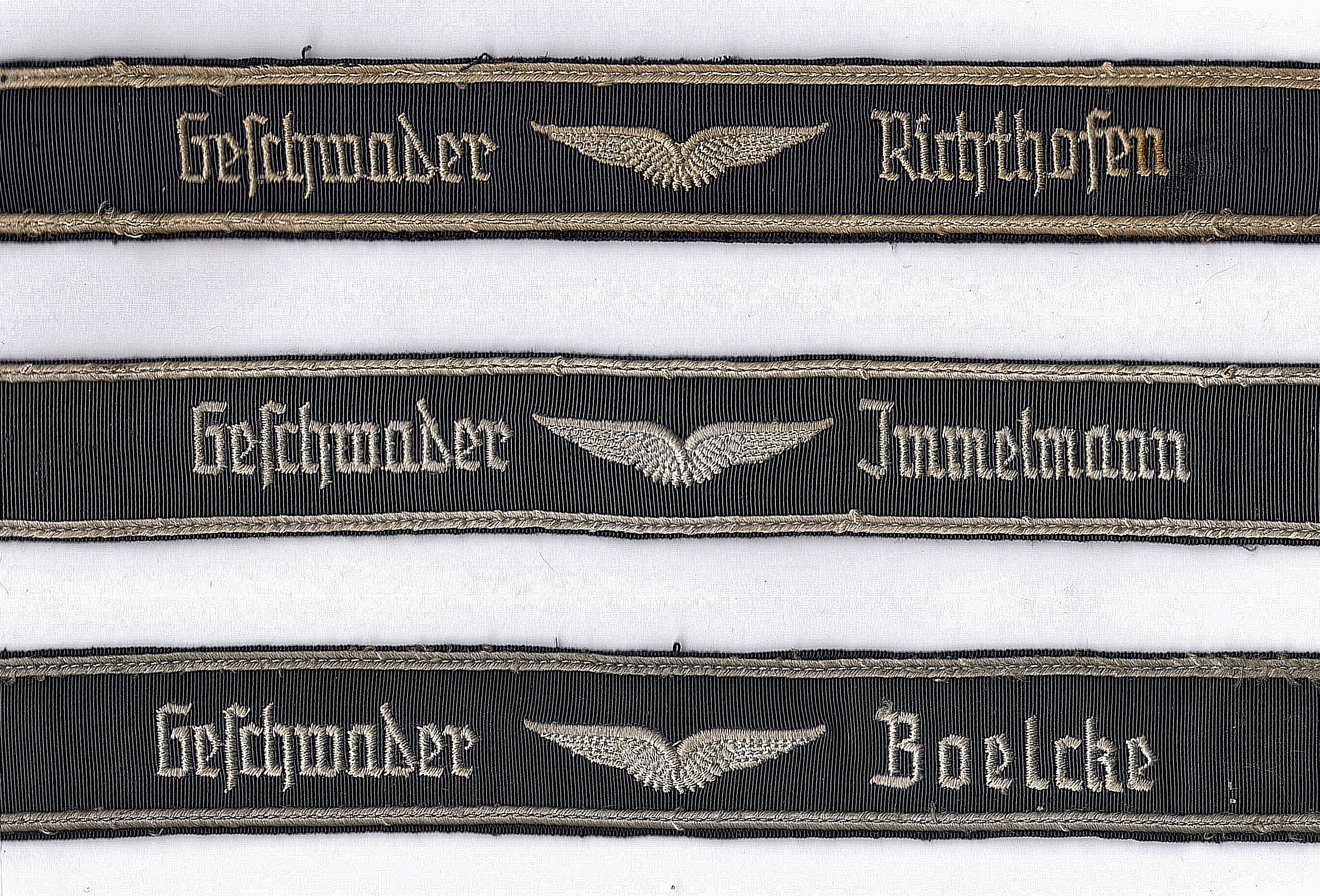
Cuff titles of the Luftwaffe

The West German Luftwaffe (Federal German Air Force) regranted the tradition of awarding cuff titles to its Traditionsverbände such as: "Jagdgeschwader Immelmann", "Jagdgeschwader Steinhoff", "Jagdgeschwader Richthofen" and "Jagdgeschwader Boelke", which were named after famous fighter pilots of the First and Second World Wars. The cuff title for "Jagdgeschwader Mölders" was later withdrawn.

The German Army continues to wear some distinctive cuff titles today. The first, used by the German Army Aviation Corps is a stylized silver grey "wing" on a black band with silver piping on the top and bottom edges. The second for its Armoured Training Battalion (and School) which is a silver grey embroidered "Panzerlehrbrigade 9" in Gothic script. Also the schools "Offizierschule des Heeres" and "Unteroffizierschule des Heeres" have granted cuff title.

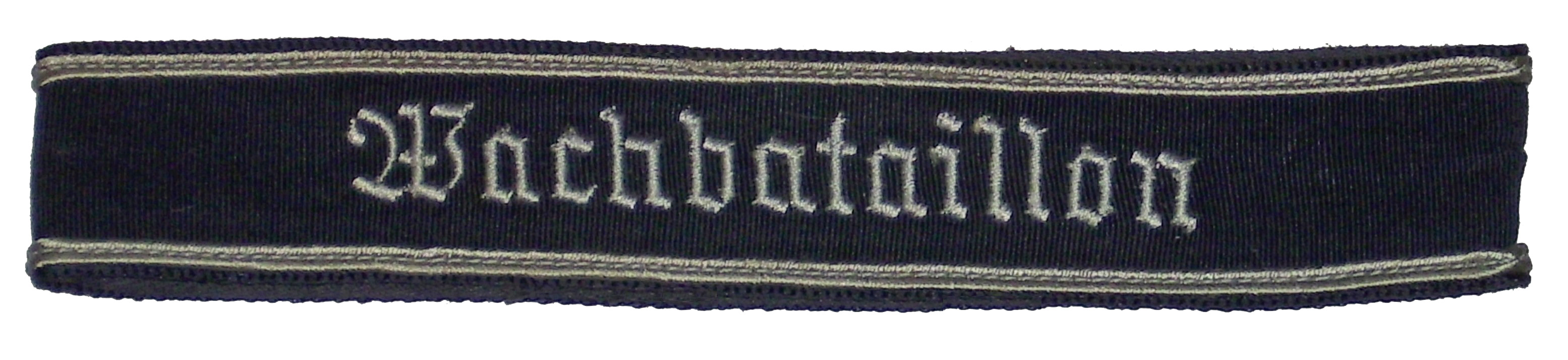
Cuff title of the Wachbataillon.

The third for its Wachbataillon which is a silver grey embroidered "Wachbataillon" in Gothic script on a black band with silver piping on the top and bottom edges.

== Sources ==
- Klietmann, Kurt-Gerhard (1981). Auszeichnungen des Deutschen Reiches, 1936–1945 (In German). Motorbuch, Stuttgart. ISBN 3-87943-689-4.
- Littlejohn, David; Dodkins, Colonel C. M. (1968). Orders, Decorations, Medals and Badges of the Third Reich. R. James Bender Publishing, California. ISBN 978-0854200801.
- Ian Blanthorn Military Historian.
- Williamson, Gordon (2002). World War II German Battle Insignia. Osprey Publishing. ISBN 1841763527.
