= Infantry Regiment Großdeutschland =

Elite German Army unit during World War II

- Infanterie-Regiment Großdeutschland
- Divisional insignia of Infantry Regiment Großdeutschland
- Active: 1921–45
- Country: Weimar Republic; Nazi Germany
- Branch: Army
- Type: Regiment
- Role: Mechanized Infantry
- Part of: Panzergrenadier Division Großdeutschland
- Garrison/HQ: Berlin
- Nickname: Die Feuerwehr (The Fire Brigade)
- Engagements: World War II: Battle of France; Eastern Front; Operation Barbarossa; Battle of Kursk

Commanders
- Notable commanders: Oberst Karl Lorenz

The Infantry Regiment Großdeutschland (German: Infanterie-Regiment "Großdeutschland"; lit. 'Infantry Regiment "Greater Germany"') was an elite German Army ceremonial and combat unit which saw action during World War II. Originally formed in 1921 it was known as the Wachregiment Berlin. Renamed Infanterie-Regiment Großdeutschland in 1939, the regiment served in the campaigns in France and the Low Countries. It then served exclusively on the Eastern Front until the end of the war. It was destroyed near Pillau in May 1945.

Großdeutschland is sometimes mistakenly perceived to be part of the Waffen-SS, whereas it was actually a unit of the regular German Army (Heer). In 1942 it was expanded into the Großdeutschland Division, the best-equipped division in the Wehrmacht, which received equipment before all other units, including some Waffen-SS units; however it remained a regiment within the division and was renamed to Grenadier-Regiment Großdeutschland. It received its final name, Panzergrenadier-Regiment Großdeutschland, in 1943.

== Creation and early history - Wachregiment Berlin ==
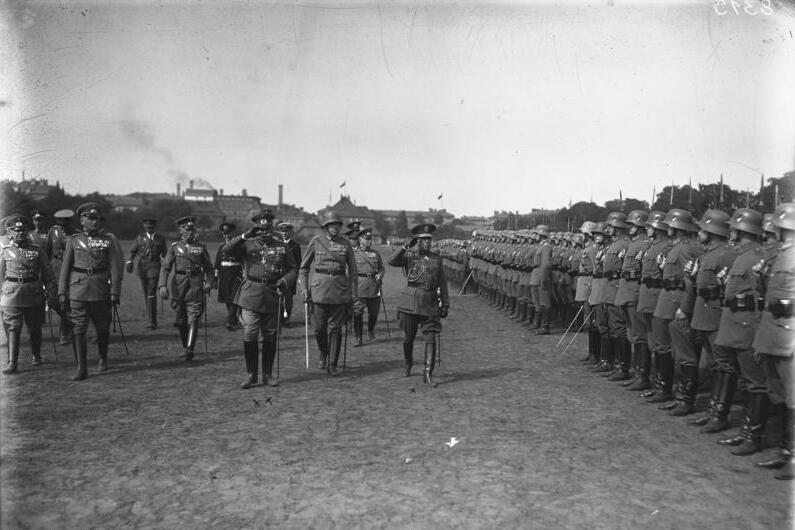
The Kommando der Wachtruppe in 1929

After the Treaty of Versailles, Germany's ground forces (the Reichsheer), were limited to just 100,000 men. The Weimar Republic was far from secure. Veterans were forming private groups with their own political agendas (see Freikorps). Communist and Fascist groups battled in the streets, and the threat of political overthrow was to be taken seriously.

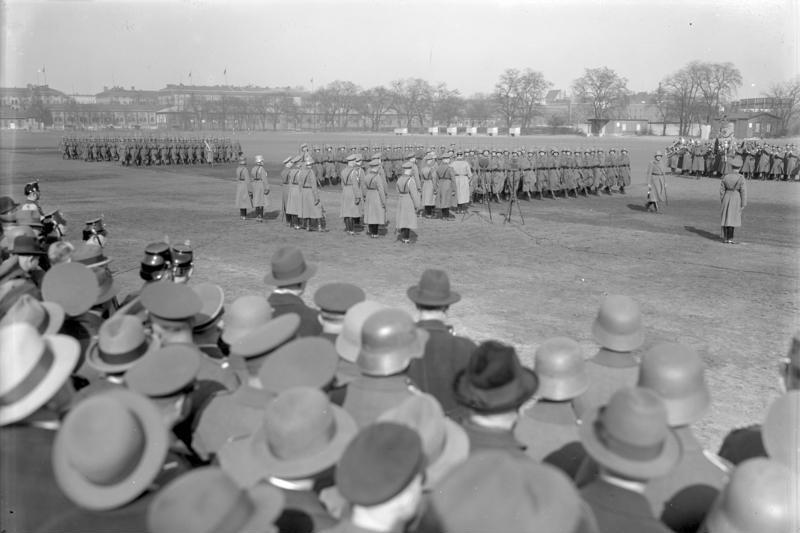
Bundesarchiv Bild 102-13187, Berlin, Parade der Wachtruppen 1932

To offset the threat of revolution, the Wachregiment Berlin was founded in early 1921. Besides defending the fledgling republic, the Wachregiment was used for ceremonial and representative duties such as parades and guard duties in the capital. The Wachregiment was short-lived, and was disbanded in June 1921. However, the unit was soon reformed as Kommando der Wachtruppe (lit. Guard Troop Command), a unit with the same duties as the Wachregiment.

The Wachtruppe comprised seven companies, each drawn from one of the seven divisions permitted Germany by the treaty. Each company served for three months before returning to their parent division. In this way, the Wachtruppe represented the whole Reichsheer. The only permanent unit was the command band, which served as the official ceremonial military band of Berlin.

The Kommando was based at Moabit Barracks, and every Monday, Wednesday, Friday and Saturday, performed a changing of the guard ceremony for the public. This ceremony was quite modest, but on Sunday, Tuesday and Thursdays the entire Wachtruppe, accompanied by the regimental band, marched from the barracks through the Brandenburg Gate and to the War Memorial at the Neue Wache, similar to the changing of the Queen's Guard at Buckingham Palace.

The Wachtruppe was left in place by the NSDAP leadership after Adolf Hitler's appointment as Chancellor in 1933. In 1934, the unit was renamed Wachtruppe Berlin and in 1936 the addition of a headquarters and administration company raised the unit size to a full battalion with 8 companies, the battalion HQ, and service support elements.

In June 1937, the unit was again renamed, this time to Wach Regiment Berlin. The recruitment system was reworked, with postings no longer on divisional lines, but instead individual soldiers were posted to the unit for 6-month tours of duty. A supply company was also added to the Regiment's order of battle.

In World War I, Germany had been more of a political concept than a nation, and most divisions were still named for their region (e.g. Saxon, Prussian, Bavarian, Baden etc.). Under the NSDAP, the country had been finally united as a true Deutschland, but this was only a part of the Party's plans for a Greater Germany, encompassing all Germanic peoples under one banner, and with its capital in Berlin, to be renamed Germania it was to become a Großdeutschland.

The Wach Regiment Berlin provided escorts and guards of honour for state visits, conferences and the Olympic Games.

Despite the fact that Hitler's personal security was in the hands of the SS Leibstandarte, on the outbreak of World War II a small detachment was drawn from the Wach Regiment to become Hitler's official state bodyguard. This unit was called the Führer Begleit ("Führer Escort") battalion, and was to eventually be expanded to divisional size (see Führer-Begleit Division).

== Infanterie-Regiment Großdeutschland - France and The Low Countries ==
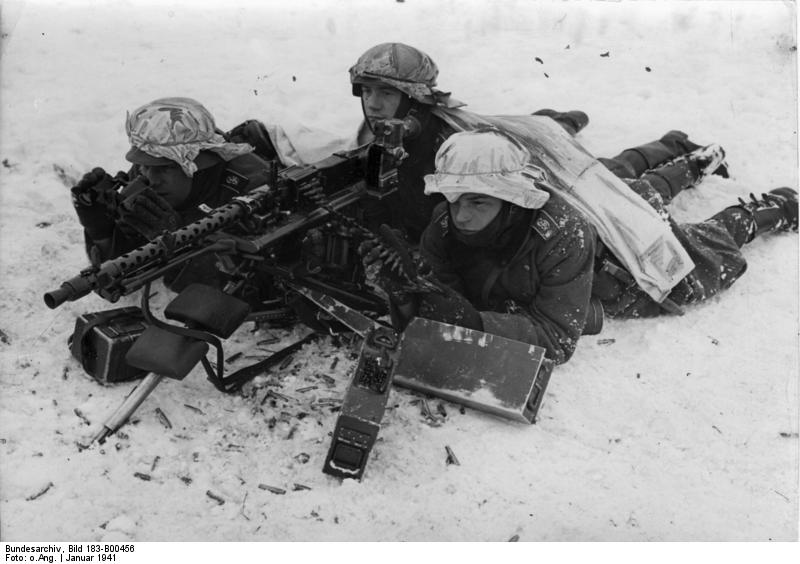
Soldiers of the Großdeutschland regiment man a heavy MG 34 on a stationary tripod mount

In the months leading up to World War II, while the rest of the Wehrmacht Heer marched into The Saarland, Austria and Czechoslovakia, the men of Wach Regiment Berlin marched up and down Unter den Linden Strasse every Sunday. However they were not to stay out of the front lines for long.

In the first week of 1939, Hitler ordered that the Wach Regiment be renamed Infanterie-Regiment Großdeutschland. The unit was now a permanent cadre, and unlike other regiments of the German Army (which were raised from a particular region), future recruits of the Großdeutschland were to be recruited across nationwide lines, with officers also drawn nationally. The unit was officially activated on 14 June 1939, and the occasion was marked by a parade through the streets of the capital.

The regiment was being reorganized in September 1939, and did not take part in Fall Weiss (the invasion of Poland), a fact that dented the pride of the regiment which bore the name of the nation on their sleeves. However, in May 1940, the regiment was attached to Generalfeldmarschall Ewald von Kleist's Panzergruppe Kleist and saw combat from the beginning of Fall Gelb, the invasion of the West, on 10 May 1940.

On the first day of the invasion, the majority of the Großdeutschland regiment was attached to the 10th Panzer Division and engaged in fighting in Luxembourg in an attempt to outflank southern Belgian fortifications. Meanwhile, III. Battalion was involved in an airborne attack further north in Belgium. The regiment was then involved in the crossing of the Meuse river. Near the town of Stonne, the regiment was involved in heavy fighting with French armoured forces, and acquitted itself well.

The regiment then marched north, being involved in holding the Dunkirk pocket, before being transferred south to join the attack across the Seine.

During the rout of the French Army, in June 1940, the regiment massacred African soldiers and their White officers it had taken prisoner near the Bois d'Eraine. Ten more Black Frenchmen were murdered near Lyon.

The French surrender found the regiment in Lyon. After a stopover in Paris to take part in the German victory parade, the regiment was then sent north to Celsace in preparation for Operation Sea Lion, the projected invasion of Britain. After Sea Lion was called off, the regiment was moved to the south of France in preparation for Operation Felix, the planned invasion of Gibraltar.

== Yugoslavia - Barbarossa ==
After the cancellation of Felix, the Großdeutschland was moved east to Romania to take part in the Yugoslav campaign then in progress. The regiment's operations in this campaign were mostly pursuing the broken Yugoslav forces. I. Battalion was involved in the occupation of Belgrade, before the regiment was moved back north into Poland in preparation for Operation Barbarossa.

On 22 April 1941, soldiers of the Infantry Regiment Grossdeutschland committed a war crime in the town cemetery of Pančevo when 35 men and one woman were executed as a reprisal for the deaths of four German soldiers. Propaganda photos and film of the executions were used decades after the event to help chronicle the Wehrmacht's complicity in German atrocities during the war.

For the invasion of the Soviet Union, the regiment was attached to Generalfeldmarschall Fedor von Bock's Heeresgruppe Mitte. After crossing the border on 27 June 1941, the regiment was involved in the battles around Minsk and the creation of the Minsk pocket. Großdeutschland then crossed the Dnieper and advanced on Yelnya, where it was involved in heavy fighting and suffered heavy losses. After the reduction of the Yelnya salient, the regiment advanced again and took part in the Battle of Kiev. The end of the year saw Großdeutschland providing support to three Infantry divisions engaged holding the Oka River line near Orel.

The Soviet winter offensive cost the regiment dearly, and in early February the skeletal II. Battalion was dissolved and the survivors used to bolster the other battalions. Later in the month, the two Grenadier Battalions were reformed into a single under strength battalion. After over 9 months of heavy fighting, Großdeutschland was pulled out of the line and reinforced. The disbanded battalions were reinstated and the regiment was allowed a few weeks rest.

== Infantry Regiment Großdeutschland 11 April 1942 ==
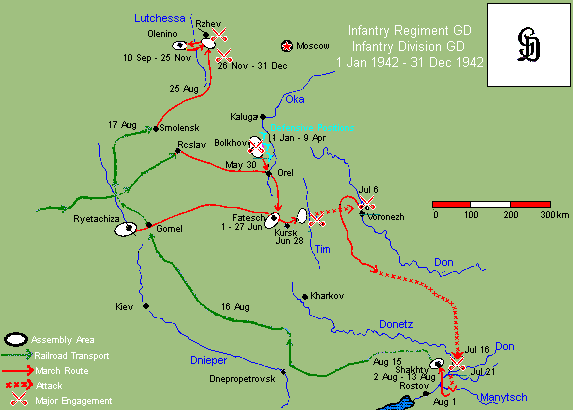
Map of Infantry Regiment Großdeutschland movements in 1942

On 1 Apr 1942, while resting and refitting near Orel, the regiment reorganized and expanded to become Infanterie-Division Großdeutschland (mot). The existing regiment was renamed Infanterie-Regiment Großdeutschland 1, and was joined in the division by Infanterie-Regiment Großdeutschland 2, which had been formed in Berlin. Supporting units in the form of a Panzer battalion, an assault gun battalion and increased flak, artillery and engineers were added with the upgrade to divisional status.

After the reorganization, the Großdeutschland Division was assigned to XLVIII.Panzerkorps during the opening phases of Fall Blau, the assault on Stalingrad. The division took part in the successful attacks to cross the upper Don river and to capture Voronezh. In August, the division was pulled back to the north bank of the Donets and held as a mobile reserve and counterattack force.

== Grenadier Regiment Großdeutschland 1 October 1942 ==
On 1 Oct 1942, the regiment was renamed "Grenadier Regiment Großdeutschland". Their counterparts became Füsilier Regiment GD. After the Soviet Operation Uranus, the regiment was involved in heavy winter fighting with the rest of the division near Rzhev.

=== Kharkov ===
In January–February 1943, Großdeutschland and XLVIII Panzerkorps, along with the II SS Panzer Corps took part in the Third Battle of Kharkov. The division fought alongside the 1.SS Division Leibstandarte SS Adolf Hitler, 2.SS Division Das Reich and 3.SS Division Totenkopf during these battles. After the fall of Kharkov, the Großdeutschland was pulled back and refitted. This included equipping the division with a company of Tiger I tanks.

The 1st Battalion of Grenadier Regiment GD was re-equipped at this time with a handful of Sd Kfz 251 vehicles, mainly command vehicles but also some troop carriers (SPW), and by the fighting at Kharkov, the battalion under Major Otto-Ernst Remer was fully mechanized in 83 Sd.Kfz 251s. The Füsilier Regiment did not receive SPWs until the spring of 1944.

== Panzergrenadier Regiment Großdeutschland ==
In June 1943, with the addition of armoured personnel carriers and a company of Tiger tanks, the division was redesignated Panzergrenadier-Division Großdeutschland, and Großdeutschland 1 was renamed "Panzergrenadier Regiment "Großdeutschland". Their counterpart in the division was named "Panzerfüsilier Regiment Großdeutschland".

=== Kursk ===
The newly re-equipped division was attached to the 4.Panzer-Armee of Generaloberst Hermann Hoth, in preparation to Operation Citadel, which aimed to sever the Kursk salient. During the buildup period, a battalion of new Panther Ausf. D tanks came under the operational control of Großdeutschland. After the launch of Citadel, the division was engaged in the fight to penetrate the southern flank of the salient. The new Panthers did not perform well, suffering from engine fires and many breaking down before reaching the battle. The division was pulled back to the village of Tomarovka on 18 July 1943.

=== Defensive battles ===
After the battle of Kursk, the division was transferred back to Heeresgruppe Mitte, and resumed its role as mobile reserve. GD fought around Karachev before being transferred back to XLVIII Panzerkorps in late August. For the rest of 1943, Großdeutschland was engaged in the fighting withdrawal from the eastern Ukraine, taking part in battles around Kharkov, Belgorod, and finally on the Dnieper, ending the year near Michurin-Rog, east of Kryvyi Rih.

== 1944 ==
Großdeutschland continued fighting in the area of Krivoi-Rog early in January 1944 until it was transferred west for rest and refit. During this period, 1./Panzer Regiment 26 (Panther) joined the Panzer Regiment GD, and GD's I. Battalion moved to France to refit and train with the new tanks; they did not rejoin the division until after the Normandy invasion. The Panzergrenadier Regiment GD was a 4-battalion organization in 1944, though by June it was reduced to three.

The division, less the Panzer Regiment, was involved in heavy fighting from the Dniester to Northern Bessarabia. In early May 1944, the division, as a part of LVII.Panzerkorps took part in the Battle of Târgul Frumos, near Iaşi in Romania.

The division was next involved in the fighting around Podul. After a brief rest in early July, the division was transferred to northern Romania and then to East Prussia. Over the next months, Großdeutschland was involved in heavy fighting in both East Prussia and the Baltic States. The division was later forced to withdraw into Germany, where it was nearly destroyed during the battles in the Memel bridgehead.

== 1945 ==
By March 1945, the Division Großdeutschland had been reduced to around 4,000 men. These escaped by ferry from the collapsing Memel bridgehead and landed at Pillau. By 25 April 1945, the division ceased to exist, having been destroyed in the battles around Pillau. A few hundred of the surviving personnel made their way to Schleswig-Holstein and surrendered to British forces. The remainder surrendered to the Soviet army.

== Großdeutschland Insignia ==
Image of the dark green Gothic Script cuff title introduced in 1939. From the GD for CM website, courtesy the webmaster.

Image of the Latin Script cuff title introduced in 1944. From the GD for CM website, courtesy the webmaster.

Großdeutschland insignia consisted of intertwined GD displayed on the shoulder straps; a cuff title, of the type granted to Waffen-SS units, was also distributed. The original version (silver on green) was of the same colour as the LANDZOLL (Customs Service) cuff title. In 1940, a new cuff band (silver on black), similar to the SS, was introduced. The cuff titles may be one reason that the Großdeutschland is often mistakenly identified as a Waffen-SS formation. To distinguish between the two, the Großdeutschland was ordered to wear their cuff title on the right sleeve, while the SS wore theirs on the left.

The cuff band was not awarded until after a soldier had completed his trade training and was accepted into the division. As with all items of German military dress, older patterns were permitted to be "worn out" once newer patterns were available, and the older green cuff titles could still be seen worn in Russia by veterans of the original GD Regiment.

After expansion to a division, the regiment wore a white numeral "1" on the shoulder strap, later replaced with the wearing of white loops across the straps, to distinguish from the second GD regiment who wore red loops. Even after redesignation as a Panzergrendier regiment, the white waffenfarbe (branch colour) was retained.

== Commanders ==
Infantry Regiment Grossdeutschland (12 June 1939- April 1942)
Oberstleutnant (later Oberst) Wilhelm-Hunert von Stockhausen
12 June 1939 - 10 August 1941
Oberst Gerhard Graf von Schwerin (Temporary Command)
early May 1940
Oberst Walter Hörnlein
10 August 1941 - 1 April 1942
Infantry Regiment GD 1 (1 Apr 1942 - 1 Oct 1942)

Grenadier Regiment GD (1 Oct 1942 - June 1943)
Panzergrenadier Regiment GD (June 1943 - 8 May 1945)

Oberst Köhler
1 Apr 1942 - 1 Dec 1942 (Killed in Action)
Oberst Karl Lorenz
1 Dec 1942 - 14 Dec 1942
Oberst Kurt Moehring
14 Dec 1942 - 14 Jan 1943
Oberst Karl Lorenz
14 Jan 1943 - 1 August 1944
Major Hugo Schimmel
1 August 1944 - August 1944
Major Harald Kriegk (?)
October 1944
Major Wolfgang Heesemann
November 1944 - Feb 1945 (Killed in Action)
Major Friedrich-Karl Krützmann
Feb 1945 - War's End

== Bibliography ==
- de Lannoy, François and Jean-Claude Perrigault La division Grossdeutschland ("The Grossdeutschland Division from Regiment to Panzerkorps 1939–1945") French edition, Editions Heimdal
- Lee, Cyrus A. Soldat: The World War Two German Army Combat Uniform Collector's Guide (Volume V: Uniforms and Insignia of Panzerkorps Grossdeutschland 1939–1945) (Pictorial Histories Publishing Company, Missoula, Montana, 1993) ISBN 0-929521-76-5
- McGuirl, Thomas & Remy Spezzano (1997). God, Honor, Fatherland: A photo history of Panzergrenadier Division "Grossdeutschland" on the Eastern Front. 1942–1944. Southbury (Connecticut, USA). ISBN 0-9657584-0-0.
- Sharpe, Michael and Brian L. Davis GROSSDEUTSCHLAND: Guderian's Eastern Front Elite, Compendium Publishing Ltd, 2001 ISBN 0-7110-2854-0.
