= The Forgotten Soldier =

Book by Guy Sajer

The Forgotten Soldier (1965), originally published in French as Le soldat oublié, is an account by Guy Sajer (pseudonym of Guy Mouminoux) of his experiences as a German army soldier on the Eastern Front during World War II whilst serving with the elite Großdeutschland Division. With reference to the author's ambiguous relationship to war, the book has been called "the account of a disastrous love affair with war and with the army that, of all modern armies, most loved war", being written with the "admiration of a semi-outsider". The English edition was translated by Lily Emmet.

== Plot ==
Born to a French father and a German mother in Alsace, in July 1942 a teenaged Guy Sajer enlists in the German military at Chemnitz and is assigned to a transport unit responsible for supplying Wehrmacht forces advancing into the Soviet Union during Operation Barbarossa. Sajer is later sent to serve on the frontline as an infantryman, and after experiencing combat on the Eastern Front volunteers for the panzergrenadier unit of the elite Großdeutschland Division. Sajer is first sent to fight in the Ukrainian Soviet Socialist Republic, and later fought against Red Army counter offensives around Kursk and Kharkov. Sajer's unit is ultimately forced to retreat west back towards Nazi Germany, eventually being transferred to East Prussia, and after escaping by sea in the aftermath of the Battle of Memel he finally surrenders to Allied powers advancing into Hannover in the spring of 1945.

== Personal narrative ==
Sajer wrote that The Forgotten Soldier was intended as a personal narrative, stressing the non-technical and anecdotal nature of his book. In a 1997 letter to US Army historian Douglas Nash, he stated that, "Apart from the emotions I brought out, I confess my numerous mistakes. That is why I would like that this book may not be used under [any] circumstances as a strategic or chronological reference."

After reading Sajer's latest letter, one of his staunchest critics—Großdeutschland Veteran's Association leader Helmuth Spaeter—recanted his original suspicions of Sajer, noting "I have underestimated Herr Sajer and my respect for him has greatly increased. I am myself more of a writer who deals with facts and specifics, much less like one who writes in a literary way. For this reason, I was very skeptical towards the content of his book."

The British writer Alan Clark, author of Barbarossa: The Russian-German Conflict 1941–45, refers to Sajer's book in his Diaries as a book "to which AC [Alan Clark] often turned". The book was considered by the U.S. Army Command and General Staff College to be an accurate roman à clef and has remained on its recommended reading list for World War II, along with other historical novels. It is also on the recommended reading list of the Commandant of the United States Marines Corps.

== Reviews and critical commentary ==
The book was reviewed in The New York Times by J. Glenn Gray in 1971. He reports the "book is painful to get through. But it is also difficult to put down and is worth the cost in horror that reading it entails." Other reviews from 1971 include The New Yorker, Time magazine, and The New Republic by James Walt. Walt says the book is not anti-war but an accounting of those soldiers caught up in events bigger than themselves.

Other more recent English reviewers include James Varner in Military Review in 2009. Jason S. Ridler in "War in the Precious Graveyard: Death through the Eyes of Guy Sajer", from the journal War, Literature, and the Arts suggests that Sajer idealized death in battle, and Sajer's reactions to corpses in the book reveals survivor guilt.

== Criticism ==
The accuracy and authenticity of the book have been disputed by some historians all of which later retracted their doubts except for Edwin Kennedy (himself not an historian but an army instructor that wrote two articles on the book and nothing else). Some of the details Sajer mentions appear to be incorrect, while other are impossible to verify due to the lack of surviving witnesses and documents.

The most frequently cited inaccuracy is Sajer's statement that, after being awarded the coveted Grossdeutschland Division cuff title, he and a friend were ordered to sew it on their left sleeves, when it is well established that this specific unit always wore their cuff titles on the right sleeve. Edwin Kennedy wrote that this error was "unimaginable" for a former member of such an elite German unit. However, this is a common error in many veterans who often do not recall where they had patches just that they had them. Given that Sajer was recalling events from memory 20 years after the fact he often discusses campaign locations in vague terms and never with specific dates, which makes validation harder.

Another criticism, he asserts that during the summer of 1942 he was briefly assigned to a Luftwaffe training unit in Chemnitz commanded by famed Stuka ace Hans-Ulrich Rudel, but according to Rudel himself, his training unit was actually in Graz, Austria, during the whole of 1942. However, Rudel was indeed in Chemnitz briefly in 1942 but to get married. It is possible that anyone being assigned with Stukas would have heard hearsay that Rudel would train them given his "rockstar" status.

Also, Sajer mentions seeing "the formidable Focke-Wulf [...] 195s, which could soar up quickly," taking off from an airfield outside Berlin, when no such aircraft ever existed (a Focke-Wulf projekt 195, a heavy transport, was in the pipeline, but never got off the drawing board). Given the number of large planes and prototypes in production and plentiful German propaganda to their own forces this error in hearsay was not unlikely.

Finally, the names of most of Sajer's companions and leaders do not appear on official rolls in the Bundesarchiv, nor are they known to the Grossdeutschland Veterans Association, whose leader, Helmuth Spaeter, was one of the first to question whether Sajer actually served in the Grossdeutschland Division as he claimed. Regardless as above Spaeter withdrew his criticism and went so far as to write to Kennedy on that regard.

However, some authors and other Großdeutschland veterans have testified to the book's historical plausibility, even if they cannot speak to the specific events in the book. Lieutenant Hans Joachim Schafmeister-Berckholtz, who served in the Grossdeutschland Division during the same period as Sajer, confirmed in a letter that he had read the book and considered it an accurate overall account of the Division's battles in the East, while also noting that he remembered a Landser named Sajer in his (5th) Panzergrenadier company, the same company number Sajer mentions being assigned to (though there was more than one "5th Company" in the Division).

Sajer himself struck back against the critics, claiming that The Forgotten Soldier was intended as his own personal recollections of an intensely chaotic period in German military history, and not an attempt at a serious historical study of World War II:

You ask me questions of chronology, situations, dates, and unimportant details. Historians and archivists have harassed me for a long time with their rude questions. All of this is unimportant. Other authors and high-ranking officers could respond to your questions better than I. I never had the intention to write a historical reference book; rather, I wrote about my innermost emotional experiences as they relate to the events that happened to me in the context of the Second World War.

== Film rights ==
Dutch film director Paul Verhoeven has discussed with Sajer the possibility of turning The Forgotten Soldier into a film.

== Bibliography ==
- Le soldat oublié by Guy Sajer (1965), ISBN 2-221-03739-1
