= Guy Sajer =

French military writer and cartoonist (1927–2022)

- Born: 13 January 1927; Paris, France
- Died: 11 January 2022 (aged 94)
- Other names: Guy Mouminoux, Dimitri Lahache
- Occupations: writer, comic book artist
- Notable work: The Forgotten Soldier

Guy Mouminoux (13 January 1927 – 11 January 2022), known by the pseudonym Guy Sajer, was a French writer and cartoonist who is best known as the author of the Second World War novel Le Soldat Oublié (1965, translated as The Forgotten Soldier), based on his experience serving in the Wehrmacht on the Eastern Front from 1942 to 1945, in the elite Großdeutschland Division. After the war, Mouminoux had a long career as a cartoonist, writing and illustrating under his real name, and also under the pen names Dimitri, and Dimitri Lahache.

== Early life ==
Guy Mouminoux was born in Paris on 13 January 1927, the son of a French father and an Alsatian German mother whose maiden name was Sajer. He was raised in Alsace, which was effectively annexed by Germany in 1940 following the Fall of France. According to his autobiographical novel The Forgotten Soldier, Sajer joined the Wehrmacht in 1942, aged 16. "My parents were country people, born hundreds of miles apart, a distance filled with difficulties. There were two flags for me to honour. I entered the service, dreamed and hoped. I also knew cold and fear in places never seen by Lili Marlene".

== World War II ==
Mouminoux wrote about his experience on the Eastern Front during World War II in his book Le Soldat Oublié (The Forgotten Soldier), published in 1965, more than 20 years after the events it describes, under the pseudonym Guy Sajer. The author states that he was an inhabitant of Alsace drafted into the German Wehrmacht at age 16, in 1942, (Mouminoux was in actuality 15 at this time) and that he fought in the elite Großdeutschland Division during World War II, taking his mother's name so as to blend in better with his German comrades.

The accuracy and authenticity of the book have been disputed by some historians, who argue that the book is not a completely factual account, but rather a romanticised novel - a roman à clef. Some of the details in the book, such as the precise location of the division's insignia, are incorrect, while others are impossible to verify due to the lack of surviving witnesses or official documents, most of which were destroyed during or after the war.

In a later interview, the author recalled: "It's a story... of a man forced to do things he did not want to do. When Alsace, where I lived, was annexed by Germany, I was 13 years old. From a youth camp in Strasbourg, I moved to a youth camp in Kehl, Germany. We dreamed of being real soldiers... I found myself in the Wehrmacht, the German army. What would you have me do? As a deserter, I would have been shot...We trailed in the mud, we did not sleep and we were afraid, it was terror. But I do not regret anything, I'm glad I knew it, even if it was very hard".

== Career as comic artist ==
After the war, Mouminoux worked extensively in comics published for the Franco-Belgian market under his real name, and also a variety of pseudonyms: "Lahache", "Dimitri Lahache" and just "Dimitri". Mouminoux's comics often include the theme of war and plenty of black humor.

He made his debut as a comic artist in 1946, working extensively in the 1950s and 1960s for the French magazine Cœurs Vaillants and its two spin-offs from Catholic publisher Fleurus, creating comics of a mostly historical nature, inspired by his predecessor Jijé.

For Fleurus, he co-illustrated two educational books together with younger colleague and future French comic great Jean Giraud, who was also employed at the publisher as comic artist in the period 1956–1958.

After a couple of early editorial illustrations, Mouminoux followed his colleague into the employ of publisher Dargaud in the 1960s, where he created several humorous comics for its magazine Pilote aside from providing additional illustrations for the editorials. He also befriended his earlier role model Jijé, and became assistant on the adventure Jean Valhardi series.

The publication of The Forgotten Soldier in 1965 brought Mouminoux success as a writer, but also cost him his job as a comic artist. "It allowed me to live for years. [But] If I chose to publish my novel under a pseudonym [it] was precisely not to mix everything... Now everyone knows it's me, but at the time, I was furious. I got fired from Pilote because of that."

In May 2000, Glénat Manga published Mouminoux's comic book account of the Battle of Kursk, again drawing on his personal experiences in WW2, titled Kursk: Tourmente d'Acier, under his pen name Dimitri.

== Later life and death ==
He died on 11 January 2022, at the age of 94.

== Bibliography ==
=== Biography ===
- Le soldat oublié by Guy Sajer (1965) ISBN 2-221-03739-1

=== Comic albums ===
- Kursk : tourmente d'acier by Dimitri (2000) ISBN 2-7234-3264-5
