= Panzergrenadier Division Großdeutschland =

German army unit during World War II

Panzergrenadier Division "Großdeutschland" Division "Großdeutschland"
- Panzergrenadier-Division "Großdeutschland" "Großdeutschland"-Division
- Insignia of the Großdeutschland Division
- Active: 19 May 1942 – 9 May 1945
- Country: Germany
- Branch: German Army
- Type: Panzergrenadier
- Size: Division
- Part of: Infantry Regiment; Infantry Division; Panzer Grenadier Division; Panzer Corps
- Garrison/HQ: Grafenwöhr Training Area, near Grafenwöhr, Bavaria, Germany Military training area near Zielenzig, Brandenburg, Germany
- Nicknames: Die Feuerwehr ("The Fire Brigade")
- Mottos: Gott, Ehre, Vaterland ("God, Honor, Fatherland")
- Engagements: World War II; French Campaign; Invasion of Yugoslavia; Operation Barbarossa; Battle of Białystok–Minsk; Operation Typhoon; Case Blue; Battle of Rzhev; Third Battle of Kharkov; Battle of Kursk; First Jassy–Kishinev Offensive; First Battle of Târgu Frumos; Vistula–Oder Offensive; East Pomeranian Offensive; Battle of Memel

Commanders
- Notable commanders: Wilhelm-Hunold von Stockhausen; Gerhard Graf von Schwerin; Walter Hörnlein; Hermann Balck; Hasso von Manteuffel; Karl Lorenz; Dietrich von Saucken; Georg Jauer

Insignia
- Cuff title: (Gothic script cuff title, 1939–1940; Sütterlin script from October 1940); (Latin Script cuff title; 1944–1945)

The Panzergrenadier Division "Großdeutschland", (Note: Großdeutschland means "Greater Germany", in this context it means "Greater Germanic Reich") also commonly referred to simply as Großdeutschland (Note: The formation went through various stages of expansion, reorganization and name changes, but the word "Großdeutschland" stayed in use through all the changes) or Großdeutschland Division, was an elite combat unit of the German Army (Heer) that fought on the Eastern Front in World War II.

Formed in 1921, it was known as the Wachregiment Berlin and served as a ceremonial guard unit until it was in mid-1939 re-equipped for combat, becoming a regiment of the combined Wehrmacht German armed forces. The regiment would later be expanded and renamed Infanterie-Division Großdeutschland in 1942, and after significant reorganization was renamed Panzergrenadier-Division Großdeutschland in May 1943. In November 1944, while the division retained its status as a Panzergrenadier division, some of its subordinate units were expanded to divisional status, and the whole group of divisions were reorganized as Panzerkorps Großdeutschland.

== 1939–March 1942 ==
The Infantry Regiment Großdeutschland was activated on 14 June 1939 (Note: Tewes, citing the Heeresverordnungsblatt (army gazette), dates the conferral of the name Großdeutschland on the Wachregiment Berlin to 1 July 1939.) and was still in training when World War II in Europe began with the German invasion of Poland on 1 September. The regiment first saw action in the May-June 1940 Battle of France, and took part in the invasion of Yugoslavia in April 1941. It was attached to Panzer Group 2 in the opening phases of Operation Barbarossa – the invasion of the Soviet Union – and was nearly destroyed in the Battle of Moscow in late 1941. On the last day of February 1942, the remnants of the regiment absorbed two battalions of reinforcements that arrived from Neuruppin and the regiment was reconstituted. It later moved to Orel (now Oryol), and on 1 April 1942 the former Infantry Regiment Großdeutschland was reinforced and expanded into the Infanterie-Division Großdeutschland (mot.) (motorized Infantry Division Grossdeutschland) using newly arrived troops from Germany.

== April 1942-May 1943 ==
The division was assigned to XXXXVIII Panzer Corps during the opening phases of Fall Blau (Case Blue), the Wehrmacht's 1942 strategic summer offensive in southern Russia. It attacked on 28 June and on 6 July formed a bridgehead east of the Don at Voronezh, before advancing towards the lower Don. In early August the division was withdrawn and sent as a reserve to the 9th Army in the central sector of the front; on 10 September it counter-attacked near Rzhev and suffered very heavy losses, its tank battalion losing 80 percent of its vehicles. During the combined Soviet winter offensives Operation Uranus and Operation Mars in late November through mid-December, the division fought near Rzhev, where it was rendered combat ineffective. Called upon to deal with one crisis after another, the division came to be known as die Feuerwehr (the Fire Brigade). By 18 November 1942, the division only had seven Panzer II light tanks, one Panzer III and nineteen Panzer IV medium tanks, and three Sd.Kfz. 265 Panzerbefehlswagen command tanks operational.

In January–February 1943, Großdeutschland and XXXXVIII Panzer Corps, along with the II SS Panzer Corps took part in the Third Battle of Kharkov. The division had 5 Panzer IIs, 20 Panzer IIIs, 85 Panzer IVs, 9 Tiger I heavy tanks, 2 Panzerbefehlswagens, and 26 Flammpanzer III flamethrower tank variants of the Panzer III available at that time. The division fought alongside the 1. SS Division Leibstandarte SS Adolf Hitler, 2. SS Division Das Reich and 3. SS Division Totenkopf during these battles. The division's losses as total write-offs at that time amounted to one Panzer III, twelve Panzer IVs, and one Tiger I. After the capture of Kharkov, the Großdeutschland was again pulled back and refitted.

On 19 May 1943, with the addition of armoured personnel carriers and more Tiger Is the division was redesignated Panzergrenadier Division Großdeutschland (Armored Grenadier Division Grossdeutschland), though, in reality, it now had more armored vehicles than most full-strength panzer divisions. (Note: Tewes dates the renaming to June 1943, with the new designation officially effective from 23 June 1943.) On 1 June 1944 the division numbered 21,823 men, with a theoretical establishment of 232 tanks.

== June 1943–1945 ==
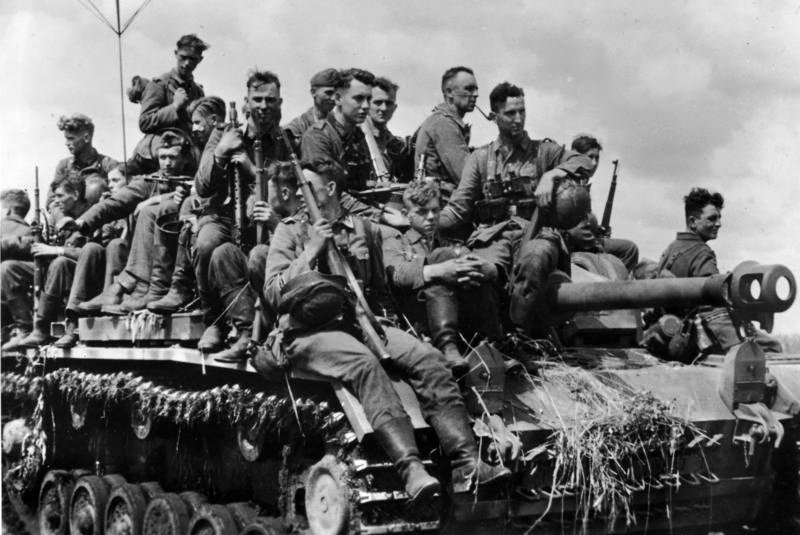
Großdeutschland Division soldiers, Kursk, July 1943

In the summer of 1943 the newly re-equipped division was subordinated to the XXXXVIII Panzer Corps, part of Fourth Panzer Army, and began preparing to take part in the Battle of Kursk. During the buildup period, a regiment of two battalions was equipped with the new Panther tanks, which were plagued by technical problems, suffering from engine fires and mechanical breakdowns before reaching the battlefield. The division also had 4 Panzer IIs, 23 Panzer IIIs, 68 Panzer IVs, 15 Tiger Is, 8 command tanks, and 14 Flammpanzer IIIs available. The battle began on 5 July; by 7 July, the division had only 80 of its 300 tanks still fit for combat. After the Kursk offensive was canceled, the division was transferred back to Army Group Center and resumed its role as a mobile reserve. The Tiger I tank company was expanded to a battalion, becoming the III. Battalion of the Panzer Regiment. Großdeutschland saw heavy fighting around Karachev before being transferred back to XLVIII Panzer Corps in late August. For the rest of 1943, Großdeutschland retreated across Ukraine, and in 1944 into Romania, where it took part in the First Battle of Târgu Frumos. By 31 May 1944, the division had 14 Panzer IV, 90 Panther and 40 Tiger I tanks.

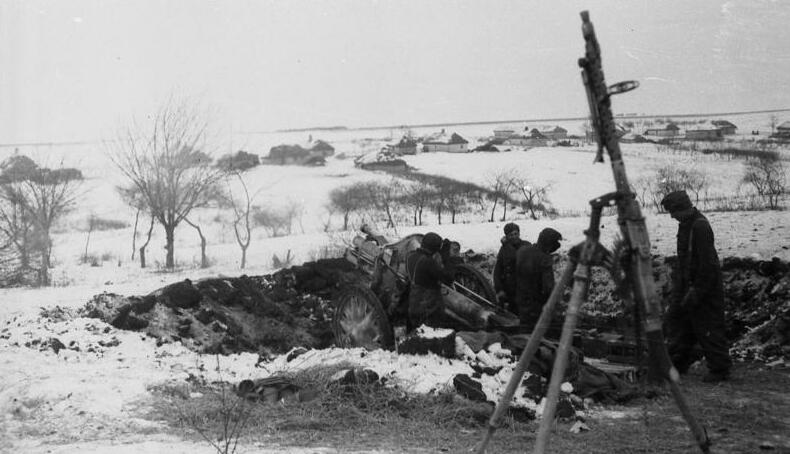
Artillery of Großdeutschland Division, Central Soviet Union, Winter 1943

In early August, the division was transferred to East Prussia from Army Group South Ukraine. Over the next months, Großdeutschland was involved in heavy fighting in both East Prussia – including a counter-attack on Wilkowischken – and the Baltic States, suffering high casualties in both men and materiel. The division was nearly destroyed during the battles in the Memel bridgehead.

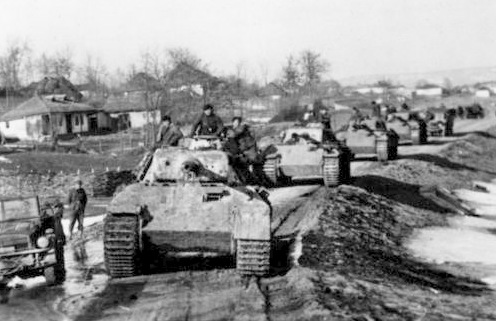
Panther tanks of the division in Romania, 1944

In November 1944, the division and several attached units were redesignated as Panzerkorps Großdeutschland. By March 1945, the Panzer Grenadier Division Großdeutschland had been reduced to around 4,000 men after the Battle of Memel. It had only one Sturmgeschütz III self-propelled gun, one Panzer IV, five Panthers, and six Tiger Is by 15 March 1945. By 25 April, the division was engaged in heavy fighting in the battles around Pillau. Eight hundred men of the division were evacuated on ferries via the Baltic Sea and surrendered to British forces in Schleswig-Holstein on 9 May. The rest were either killed or captured during the fighting in Pillau or surrendered to Soviet forces on 9 May on the Vistula spit. According to Tewes, the division was destroyed in the defensive fighting in East Prussia by the end of April, and only about 1,000 survivors escaped across the Vistula Spit, being evacuated to Bornholm and Fehmarn, where they saw the end of the war.

== War crimes ==
During the Battle of France, soldiers of the division perpetrated summary executions of hundreds of Black prisoners of war in French service. These executions were racially motivated, as German troops had been conditioned by Nazi propaganda to see Black people as subhuman. In several instances, Black prisoners of war were separated from White ones and murdered by soldiers of the division, including on 10 June 1940, where 150 Black prisoners were massacred in Erquinvillers. Another mass killing committed by the division, together with soldiers of the SS Division Totenkopf, was the Chasselay massacre; on 19-20 June hundreds of Black prisoners of war were murdered in Chasselay, Rhône.

=== Reprisals ===
The book German Army and Genocide mentions the following incident, from the invasion of Yugoslavia:

When one German soldier was shot and one seriously wounded in Pancevo, Wehrmacht soldiers and the Waffen SS rounded up about 100 civilians at random...the town commander, Lt. Col. Fritz Bandelow conducted the Courts Martial...The presiding judge, SS-Sturmbannführer Rudolf Hoffmann sentenced 36 of those arrested to death. On April 21, 1941, four of the civilians were the first to be shot...On the following day, eighteen victims were hanged in a cemetery and fourteen more were shot at the cemetery wall by an execution squad of the Wehrmacht's Großdeutschland regiment.

—

According to the Hamburg Institute for Social Research's study of Wehrmacht crimes, the soldier who was killed belonged to a supply company of the SS Division Das Reich, and the shots were probably fired by partisans; the town commander, Bandelow, was an officer of the Großdeutschland regiment. Those sentenced to death included a 15-year-old boy, and according to an eyewitness the defendants were given no opportunity to defend themselves.

Part of the photographic presentation for the book includes a photo in which the Großdeutschland cuff title on an officer is clearly visible. Großdeutschland's complicity in many subsequent war crimes in Russia and Ukraine was a subject of the book by Omer Bartov The Eastern Front, 1941–45, German Troops, and the Barbarization of Warfare (1986, ISBN 0-312-22486-9).

Under existing international law at the time, reprisals were permitted, though the Allied nations and Nazi Germany had differing interpretations of the law. In postwar war crimes trials, reprisal killings were deemed to be illegal, a conclusion enshrined in international law by the United Nations.

=== Scorched earth, 1943 ===
During the retreat from Ukraine in the autumn of 1943, the division took part in scorched earth measures. According to a report by the division's evacuation detachment (Räumungskommando), between 6 and 28 September 1943 it blew up 1,260 agricultural machines and 165 grain and oil mills, drove off 9,268 head of livestock, removed 1,393 tonnes of grain, and deported 13,627 civilians.

== Insignia ==
To mark its elite status, the unit was permitted to wear special insignia. The best known was a cuff title bearing the word Großdeutschland, worn on the right cuff. The first versions, introduced on 15 September 1939 and in May 1940, had Gothic lettering; a version in German script (Sütterlin) replaced them on 7 October 1940, and a Latin-script version followed later. An interlaced "GD" monogram, introduced by an order dated 20 July 1939, was worn on the shoulder straps, and longer collar patches were also authorised. All of the division's vehicles carried a white steel helmet, shown in profile facing left, as the formation sign.

== Organization ==
Structure of the division:

- Headquarters
- Großdeutschland Reconnaissance Battalion
- Großdeutschland Panzer Regiment
- Großdeutschland Grenadier Regiment
- Großdeutschland Fusilier Regiment
- Großdeutschland Engineer Battalion
- Großdeutschland Artillery Regiment
- Großdeutschland Tank Destroyer Battalion
- Großdeutschland Army Anti-Aircraft Battalion
- Großdeutschland Assault Gun Battalion
- Großdeutschland Signal Battalion
- Großdeutschland Divisional Supply Group

== Commanders ==
Infantry Regiment Großdeutschland

- Oberstleutnant Wilhelm-Hunold von Stockhausen, July 1939 – February 1940
- Oberstleutnant Gerhard Graf von Schwerin, February 1940 – March 1940 (Note: Tewes gives Schwerin's tenure as February to May 1940, and Stockhausen's second tenure as beginning in May 1940.)
- Oberst Wilhelm-Hunold von Stockhausen, March 1940 – August 1941
- Oberst Walter Hörnlein, August 1941 – April 1942

Infantry/Panzergrenadier Division Großdeutschland

- Generalmajor Walter Hörnlein - 1 April 1942 – 3 April 1943
- Generalleutnant Hermann Balck - 3 April - 30 June 1943
- Generalleutnant Walter Hörnlein - 30 June 1943 - 1 February 1944
- Generalleutnant Hasso von Manteuffel - 1 February 1944 – August 1944
- Generalmajor Karl Lorenz - 1 September 1944 - 7 May 1945

== See also ==
- The Forgotten Soldier (1965), by Guy Sajer
