= Africa Cuff Title =

German World War II campaign award

Africa cuff title Ärmelband Afrika
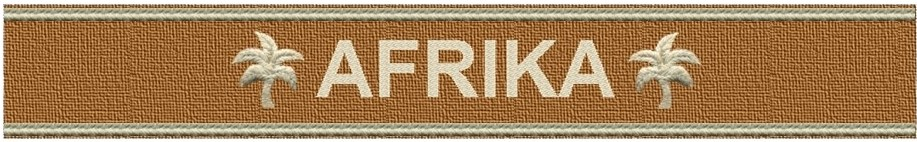
- The Africa cuff title
- Type: Campaign cuff title
- Awarded for: Participation in the North African campaign, 1941-43
- Description: Band worn above left cuff of uniform
- Presented by: Nazi Germany
- Eligibility: Wehrmacht personnel of all three services
- Campaign: World War II
- Established: 15 January 1943

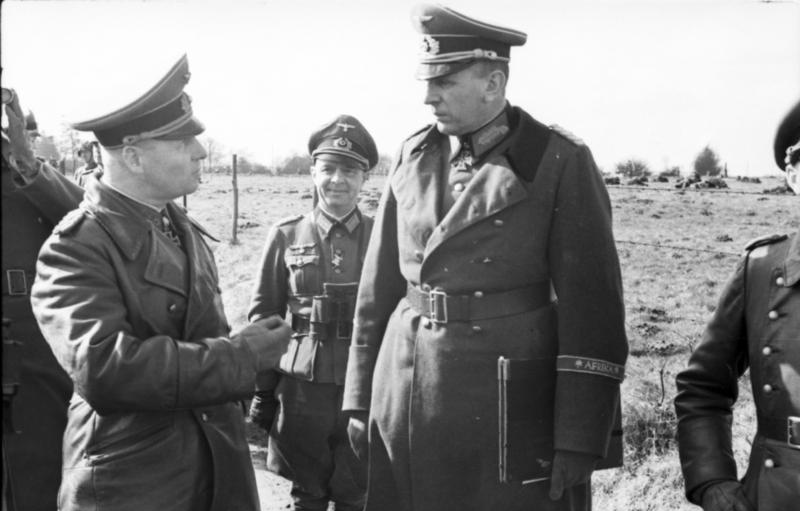
March 1944: Field-Marshal Rommel with General Erwin Menny, who wears the Africa Cuff Title

The Africa Cuff Title, or Africa Cuff Band, (German: Ärmelband Afrika) was a World War II German military decoration awarded to members of the Wehrmacht who took part in the North African campaign of 1941–43.

== Background ==
In February 1941, the German Africa Corps (DAK) was formed to support Italian forces in the North African campaign against British and Commonwealth forces. Under Erwin Rommel the DAK, supported by Luftwaffe and Naval units, occupied large parts of Libya and Egypt until finally defeated at El Alamein in October 1942. Forced to retreat, and faced with allied landings in Morocco and Algeria, DAK forces either evacuated North Africa or surrendered, with the last German units in Africa capitulating on 13 May 1943.

In July 1941, a dark-green cuff title with a white and khaki border inscribed AFRIKAKORPS was authorised, to be worn on the right cuff by members of the DAK who had served a minimum of two months in Africa. This was a corps designation badge, not a campaign award, and personnel who permanently transferred out of the North African theatre no longer had the right to wear it. The Luftwaffe later introduced a cuff title of a different design for airmen based in North Africa. As with the Army, this was not intended for wear by those no longer posted to North Africa. There was also a Navy version, that may have been a privately made unofficial item.

== Eligibility ==
On 15 January 1943, the Africa cuff title was instituted by Adolf Hitler as a formal campaign decoration.

The final terms of this award required at least six months service in the North African theatre of operations, or any lesser period if the recipient was decorated for bravery, was wounded or if killed – in which case a posthumous award was made. Those who contracted a debilitating illness which required evacuation required three months active service prior to illness. After 6 May 1943, the qualifying period of service was reduced from six to four months.

The deadline for applications for the cuff title was 31 October 1944.

== Design and wear ==
The cuff title is a 32mm wide mid-brown camel hair band, bearing the word AFRIKA flanked on both sides by an image of a palm tree and edged top and bottom with a 3mm strip, all embroidered in silver-grey braid or cotton. The design was the same for all three armed services.

The band was worn on the lower left sleeve of the uniform, including on greatcoats. Where two or more campaign cuff titles were awarded, the earliest qualified for was correctly worn above later awards, although this regulation was not always followed.

Nazi era decorations were banned after the war. The Africa Cuff Title was among those re-authorised for wear by the Federal Republic of Germany in 1957. While many awards were re-designed to remove the swastika, the original cuff title could be worn unaltered as it did not bear this symbol. Members of the Bundeswehr who were qualifying veterans wore the award on their ribbon bar, represented by a small replica of the cuff design on a silver-edged mid-brown ribbon.

== See also ==
- Orders, decorations, and medals of Nazi Germany
- Crete Cuff Title
- Metz 1944 Cuff Title
- Courland Cuff Title
