= Crete Cuff Title =

German World War II campaign award

Crete cuff title Ärmelband Kreta
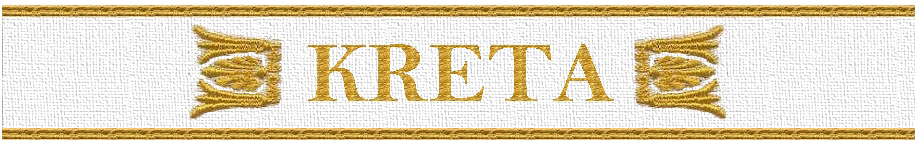
- The Crete cuff title
- Type: Campaign cuff title
- Awarded for: Participation in the battle of Crete
- Description: Band worn above left cuff of uniform
- Presented by: Nazi Germany
- Eligibility: Military personnel of all three services
- Campaign: World War II
- Established: 1942

Highlights
- Total: Ca. 28,000 recipients
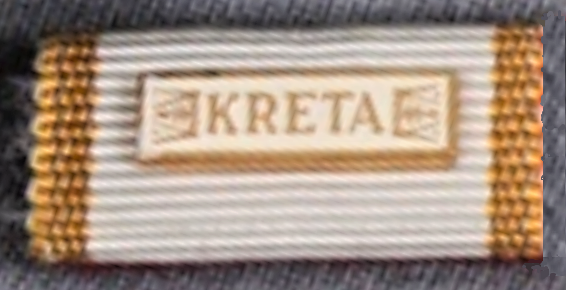
- Post-war ribbon bar

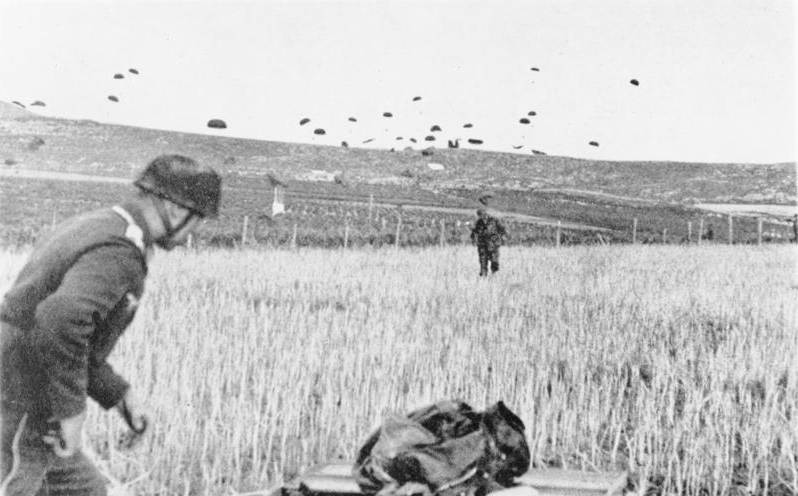
German paratroopers landing on Crete, May 1941

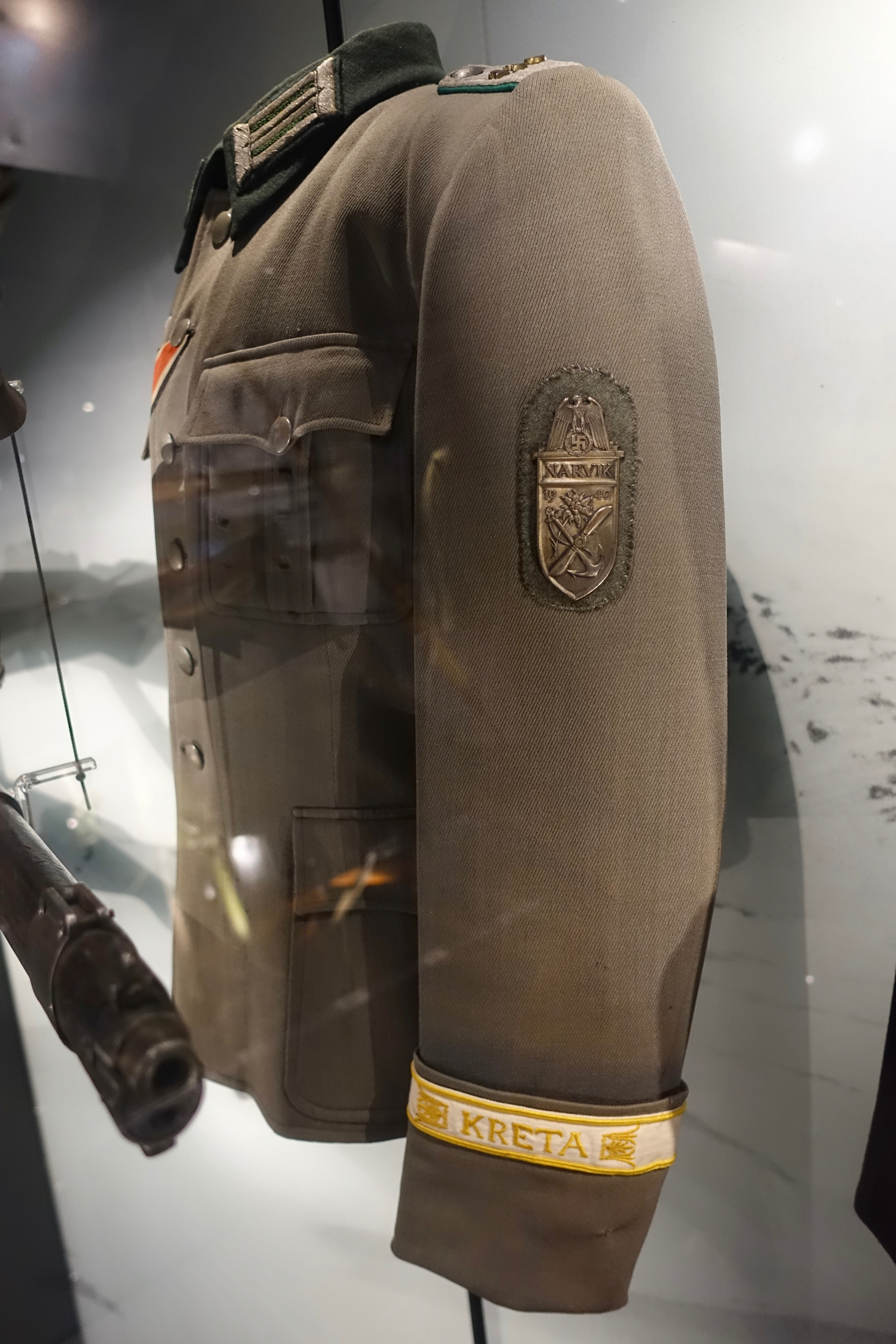
Officer's tunic, showing Narvik Shield and Crete cuff title

The Crete Cuff Title, or Crete Cuff Band, (German: Ärmelband Kreta) was a World War II German military decoration awarded to Wehrmacht servicemen who took part in the battle of Crete between 20 and 27 May 1941.

While a number of German units had worn cuff titles as part of their regimental or corps insignia, this was the first World War II operation where a cuff title was awarded as a campaign award.

== Eligibility ==
As part of Germany's Balkan campaign, the Wehrmacht invaded the island of Crete on 20 May 1941. About 22,000 paratroopers and mountain troops took part, delivered by transport aircraft, gliders and naval vessels and supported by bomber and fighter aircraft. After two weeks of fierce fighting, the defending Greek and British Commonwealth troops had either surrendered or been evacuated.

The cuff title was instituted separately by each of Germany's armed services:

- Navy: 14 August 1942;
- Luftwaffe: 29 September 1942;
- Army: 16 October 1942.

While the conditions of eligibility differed between the three services, the broad qualifying criteria were that, between 20 – 27 May 1941, a member of the German armed forces would have to:

- land on Crete, either by ship, parachute or glider; or
- take part in air operations over Crete, including transporting troops; or
- be on active service at sea in the Crete theatre of operations.

The cuff title was distributed for wear from mid-1943. The deadline for applications was 31 October 1944.

== Design and wear ==
The cuff title is 32mm wide and consists of a yellow-edged white cloth band, embroidered in yellow silk or cotton thread with the word KRETA flanked on both sides by a spray of acanthus leaves. The design was the same for all three armed services.

The band was worn on the lower left sleeve of the uniform, including on greatcoats. Where two or more campaign cuff titles were awarded, the earliest qualified for was correctly worn above later awards, although this regulation was not always followed.

Nazi era decorations were banned after the war. The Crete Cuff Title was among those re-authorised for wear by the Federal Republic of Germany in 1957. While many awards were re-designed to remove the swastika, the original cuff title could be worn unaltered as it did not bear this symbol. Members of the Bundeswehr who were qualifying veterans wore the award on their ribbon bar, represented by a small replica of the cuff design on a yellow-edged white ribbon.

== See also ==
- Orders, decorations, and medals of Nazi Germany
- Africa Cuff Title
- Metz 1944 Cuff Title
- Courland Cuff Title

== Sources ==
- Angolia, John (1987). For Führer and Fatherland: Military Awards of the Third Reich. R. James Bender Publishing. ISBN 0912138149.
- Littlejohn, David; Dodkins, Colonel C. M. (1968). Orders, Decorations, Medals and Badges of the Third Reich. R. James Bender Publishing, California. ISBN 978-0854200801.
- Shores, Christopher; Cull, Brian; Malizia, Nicola (1987). Air War for Yugoslavia, Greece and Crete 1940–41. Grub Street, London. ISBN 0-948817-07-0.
- Williamson, Gordon (2002). World War II German Battle Insignia. Osprey Publishing. ISBN 1841763527.
- German Federal law (1957). Bundesministerium der Justiz: Gesetz über Titel, Orden und Ehrenzeichen, 26.7.1957. Bundesgesetzblatt Teil III, Gliederungsnummer 1132-1.
- German Federal regulation (1996). Dienstvorschriften Nr. 14/97. Bezug: Anzugordnung für die Soldaten der Bundeswehr. ZDv 37/10.
