= Metz 1944 Cuff Title =

German World War II campaign award

Metz 1944 cuff title Ärmelband Metz 1944
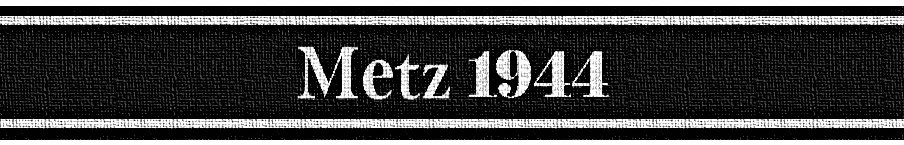
- The Metz 1944 cuff title
- Type: Campaign cuff title
- Awarded for: Participation in the battle of Metz
- Description: Band worn above left cuff of uniform
- Presented by: Nazi Germany
- Eligibility: Wehrmacht personnel
- Campaigns: Lorraine Campaign, World War II
- Established: 28 December 1944

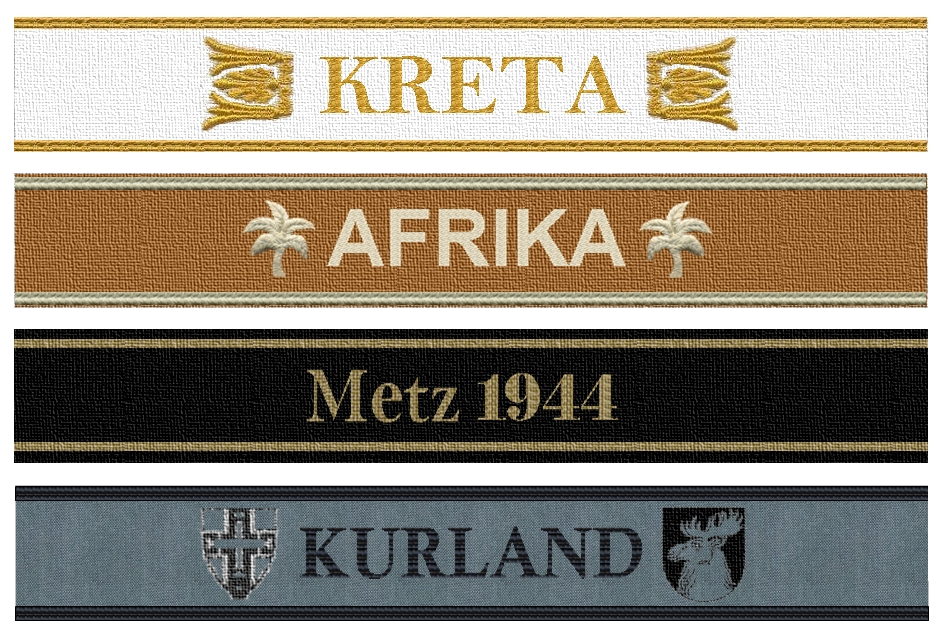
Sleeve bands of the Wehrmacht

The Metz 1944 Cuff Title, or Metz 1944 Cuff Band, (German: Ärmelband Metz 1944) was a World War II German military decoration instituted to reward members of the Wehrmacht who took part in the 1944 battle of Metz.

== Eligibility ==
After the allied breakout from Normandy, the U.S. Third Army's advance towards Germany met with heavy resistance at Metz from a hastily assembled Battle Group Siegroth, consisting of miscellaneous Waffen-SS and Army units, with staff and students from the Metz officer cadet school. This resistance helped delay the allied advance towards Germany.

The cuff title was established on 28 December 1944 by Adolf Hitler. Eligibility was open to all members of Battle Group Siegroth, including soldiers and officials, who had taken part in the fighting at Metz from 27 August to 25 September 1944 for at least seven days, or a lesser time if wounded. Although the fighting around Metz continued until December 1944, service after 25 September did not qualify. This later fighting was after the involvement of Battle Group Siegroth, which had borne the brunt of the initial fighting that successfully repulsed the US Army.

The cuff title was also intended as a tradition badge (Traditionsabzeichen) to be worn by all future staff and officer cadets of the Metz Cadet School, (Fahnenjunkerschule VI), all the time they were serving there. The school closed before this was implemented.

== Design and wear ==
The cuff title was a 32mm wide black fabric band, silver-edged, with the embroidered inscription Metz 1944 in silver braid, similar in style to Waffen-SS divisional and regimental cuff titles.

It was worn on the lower left sleeve of the uniform, including by members of Nazi party organisations. Where two or more campaign cuff titles were awarded, the earliest qualified for was correctly worn above later awards, although this regulation was not always followed.

There is evidence that a number were presented prior to the end of the war, although they were not widely distributed.

Nazi era decorations were banned after the war. The Metz Cuff Title was among those re-authorised for wear by the Federal Republic of Germany in 1957. While many awards were re-designed to remove the swastika, the original cuff title could be worn unaltered as it did not bear this symbol. Members of the Bundeswehr who were qualifying veterans wore the award on their ribbon bar, represented by a small replica of the cuff design on a black ribbon with a silver stripe close to each edge.

== See also ==
- Orders, decorations, and medals of Nazi Germany
- Crete Cuff Title
- Africa Cuff Title
- Courland Cuff Title

== Sources ==
- Scapini, Antonio (2015). The Metz 1944 Cufftitle (in: International Militaria Collector, Volume 5, Number 4). B&D Publishing LLC.
- Angolia, John (1987). For Führer and Fatherland: Military Awards of the Third Reich. R. James Bender Publishing. ISBN 0912138149.
- Klietmann, Kurt-Gerhard (1981). Auszeichnungen des Deutschen Reiches, 1936–1945 (In German). Motorbuch, Stuttgart. ISBN 3-87943-689-4.
- Littlejohn, David; Dodkins, Colonel C. M. (1968). Orders, Decorations, Medals and Badges of the Third Reich. R. James Bender Publishing, California. ISBN 978-0854200801.
- Williamson, Gordon (2002). World War II German Battle Insignia. Osprey Publishing. ISBN 1841763527.
- German Federal law (1957). Bundesministerium der Justiz: Gesetz über Titel, Orden und Ehrenzeichen, 26.7.1957. Bundesgesetzblatt Teil III, Gliederungsnummer 1132-1.
- German Federal regulation (1996). Dienstvorschriften Nr. 14/97. Bezug: Anzugordnung für die Soldaten der Bundeswehr. ZDv 37/10.
- Website: Wehrmacht-awards.com: Metz 1944
