= Karl Lorenz =

Nazi Germany general (1904–1964)

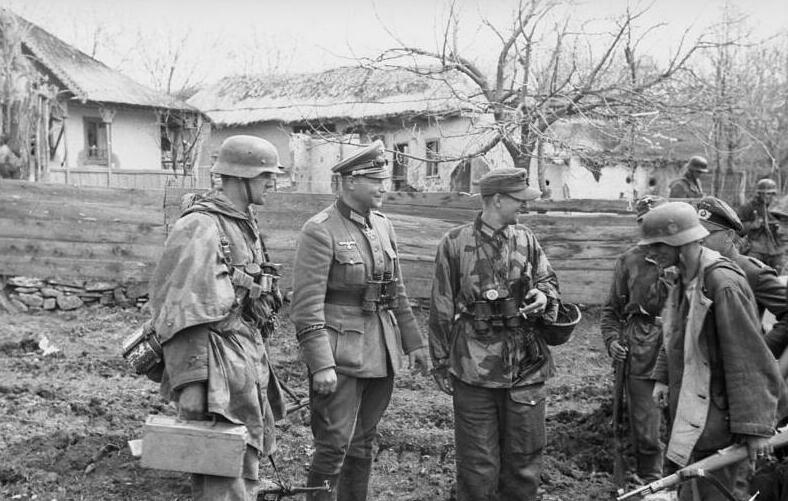
- Karl Lorenz (second from left) wearing an officer cap and an Oberst's uniform (Panzergrenadier-Division Grossdeutschland, South of Ukraine, January 1944).
- Born: 24 January 1904; Hanau
- Died: 3 October 1964 (aged 60); Bad Godesberg
- Military career
- Allegiance: Weimar Republic; Nazi Germany
- Branch: Army
- Rank: Generalmajor
- Commands: Panzer-Grenadier-Division Großdeutschland
- Conflicts: World War II
- Awards: Knight's Cross of the Iron Cross with Oak Leaves

Karl Lorenz (24 January 1904 – 3 October 1964) was a German general during World War II who commanded the Panzer Division Grossdeutschland. He was a recipient of the Knight's Cross of the Iron Cross with Oak Leaves of Nazi Germany.

== Awards and decorations ==
- Iron Cross (1939) 2nd Class (23 September 1939) & 1st Class (24 June 1940)
- German Cross in Gold on 2 January 1942 as Major in Pionier-Battalion 290
- Knight's Cross of the Iron Cross with Oak Leaves
  - Knight's Cross on 17 December 1942 as Major and commander of Pionier-Battalion "Großdeutschland"
  - Oak Leaves on 12 February 1944 as Oberst and commander of Grenadier-Regiment "Großdeutschland"

Military offices
Preceded by Generalleutnant Hasso von Manteuffel	Commander of the Panzer-Grenadier-Division Großdeutschland; 1 September 1944 - April 1945	Succeeded by None
