= Courland Cuff Title =

German World War II campaign award

Courland cuff title Ärmelband Kurland
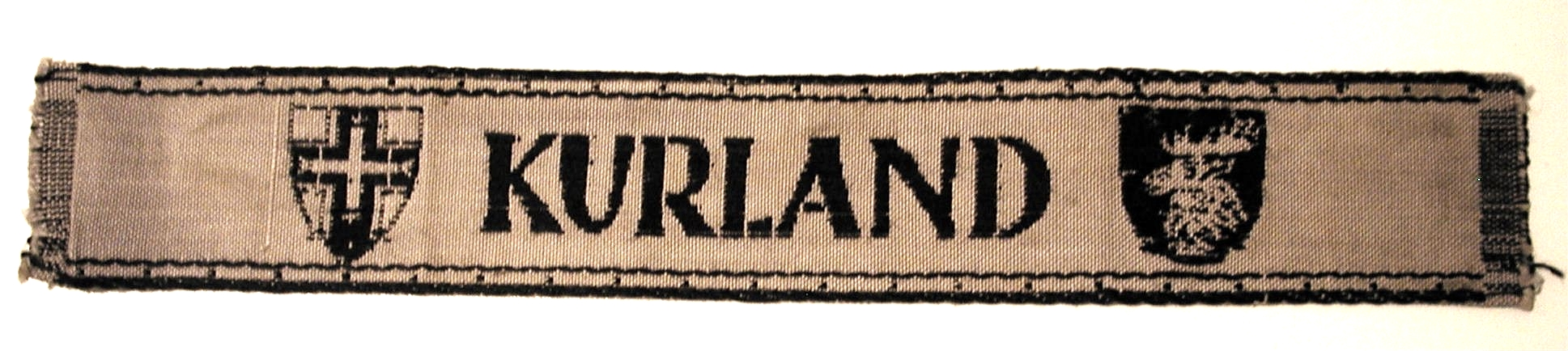
- The Courland cuff title
- Type: Campaign cuff title
- Awarded for: Service in the Courland Pocket
- Description: Band worn above left cuff of uniform
- Presented by: Nazi Germany
- Eligibility: Military personnel
- Campaigns: Eastern Front, World War II
- Established: 12 March 1945
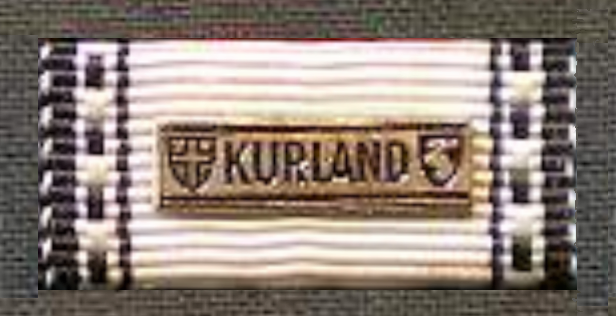
- Post-war ribbon bar

The Courland Cuff Title, or Courland Cuff Band, (German: Ärmelband Kurland) was a World War II German military decoration awarded to Wehrmacht servicemen of Army Group Courland who served in the Courland Pocket.

== Creation and eligibility ==
During the German retreat on the Eastern Front Wehrmacht forces were cut off on the Courland Peninsula in Latvia from July 1944. Renamed Army Group Courland on 25 January 1945, it held out until the end of the war in May 1945.

The cuff title was approved on 12 March 1945 by Adolf Hitler, on the recommendation of the commander of the Army Group Courland. It was the last German award to be instituted in World War II. Distribution began in late April 1945.

To qualify, a member of Army Group Courland would have to, between 1 September 1944 and 8 May 1945:

- participate in at least three combat actions; or
- serve a minimum of three months in the pocket;
- if wounded, the cuff title could be awarded without fulfilling these criteria.

Those qualifying included personnel serving with rear services, including Organisation Todt, provided they served in the pocket for at least three months.

== Design and wear ==
The regulation design of the cuff title was a 40mm wide silver-grey fabric band with a decorative black border, embroidered in black cotton thread with the word KURLAND between two shields. The left-hand shield bore a cross ending in fleurs de lys – the arms of the Grand Master of the Teutonic Knights – while the shield to the right showed the moose head coat of arms of Mitau, the Courland capital. Due to difficulties in transporting supplies to the Courland Pocket, the award was manufactured locally, initially on hand looms and later by machine. This led to variations in the detail of the design. Printed versions also exist.

The band was worn on the lower left sleeve of the uniform jacket. Where two or more campaign cuff titles were awarded, the earliest qualified for was correctly worn above later awards, although this regulation was not always followed.

Nazi era decorations were banned after the war. The Courland Cuff Title was among those re-authorised for wear by the Federal Republic of Germany in 1957. While many awards were re-designed to remove the swastika, the original cuff title could be worn unaltered as it did not bear this symbol. Members of the Bundeswehr who were qualifying veterans wore the award on their ribbon bar, represented by a small replica of the cuff design on a white ribbon with decorative black edges, similar to the original cuff design.

== See also ==
- Orders, decorations, and medals of Nazi Germany
- Crete Cuff Title
- Africa Cuff Title
- Metz 1944 Cuff Title
