= Campaign shields (Wehrmacht) =

German World War II campaign award

Campaign shields (German: Ärmelschild, lit. 'Sleeve shield'), also known as campaign arm shields, were badges of differing design awarded to members of the German Wehrmacht for participation in specific battles or campaigns during World War II. Each shield was worn on the left upper arm of the uniform jacket. If a recipient received more than one shield, the earlier was worn above any later awards.

== Official awards ==
Image	Name (German)	Institution date	Awarded for	Number of awards	Service branch
	Narvik Shield (Narvikschild)	19 August 1940	Landing in Narvik or participation in military actions of the Narvik battle group between 9 April and 9 June 1940	8,527	Army, Air Force, Navy
	Cholm Shield (Cholmschild)	1 July 1942	Defence of the Kholm Pocket between 21 January and 5 May 1942	ca. 5,500	Army, Air Force
	Crimea Shield (Krimschild)	25 July 1942	The Crimean campaign, 21 September 1941 to 4 July 1942, including the Siege of Sevastopol	ca. 250,000	Army, Air Force, Navy
	Demyansk Shield (Demjanskschild)	25 April 1943	Defence of the Demyansk Pocket, February to May 1942	ca. 96,000	Army, Air Force, Waffen-SS
	Kuban Shield (Kubanschild)	20 September 1943	The military actions around the Kuban bridgehead from 1 February to 9 October 1943	ca. 145,000	Army, Air Force, Navy
	Warsaw Shield (Warschauschild)	10 December 1944	Suppression of the Warsaw Uprising between 1 August to 2 October 1944. While award criteria and design were approved, none were produced by the end of the war.	None	Army, Air Force, Waffen-SS
	Lapland Shield (Lapplandschild)	Between February and May 1945	Service in North Finland with the 20th Mountain Army, September 1944 to May 1945.	Unknown	Army, Air Force, Navy

=== Post-war versions ===
After an initial ban, the Federal Republic of Germany re-authorised the wearing of many World War II military decorations in 1957. This included all official campaign shields except for the Warsaw and Lapland Shields. Re-designed to remove the swastika emblem, members of the Bundeswehr could wear the shields on their ribbon bar, represented by a small replica of the award on a field grey ribbon.

== Unofficial or discontinued prior to award ==
Several shields were either unofficial or had approval withdrawn during the design phase, and were therefore never manufactured and awarded:

Image	Name (German)	Institution date	Awarded for	Number of awards	Service branch
	Stalingrad Shield (Stalingradschild)	Not proceeded with	Battle of Stalingrad, 1942–43	None	Army, Air Force
	Balkans Shield (Balkanschild)	Not proceeded with	Battles in the Balkans 1944–1945	None	Army, Air Force, Navy, Waffen-SS
	Budapest Shield (Budapestschild)	Not proceeded with	Siege of Budapest, December 1944 to February 1945	None	Army, Air Force, Waffen-SS
Picture on de.wikipedia	Dunkirk Shield (Dünkirchenschild)	Unofficial locally produced award	Siege of Dunkirk (1944–45). This shield was worn on the left side of the forage cap	ca. 12,000 to 15,000	Army, Air Force, Navy
	Lorient Shield (Lorientschild)	Unofficial locally produced award	Siege of Lorient, 1944–45	ca. 10,000 to 12,000	Army, Air Force, Navy
	Memel and Neman Front Shield (Memel- und Njemenfrontschild)	Not proceeded with	Battle in the area of the city of Memel and the river Neman, 1944–45	None	Army, Air Force, Navy

== Sources ==
- Ailsby, Christopher (1987). Combat Medals of the Third Reich. Harper Collins. ISBN 978-0850598223.
- Angolia, John (1987). For Führer and Fatherland: Military Awards of the Third Reich. R. James Bender Publishing. ISBN 0912138149.
- Littlejohn, David; Dodkins, Colonel C. M. (1968). Orders, Decorations, Medals and Badges of the Third Reich. R. James Bender Publishing, California. ISBN 978-0854200801.
- Williamson, Gordon (2002). World War II German Battle Insignia. Osprey Publishing. ISBN 1841763527.
