= 281st Division =

281st Division may refer to:

- 281st Security Division, Wehrmacht, Germany
- 281st Rifle Division, Soviet Union

== See also ==
- List of military divisions by number
