= Cholm Shield =

WW2 German military decoration

Cholm Shield Cholmschild
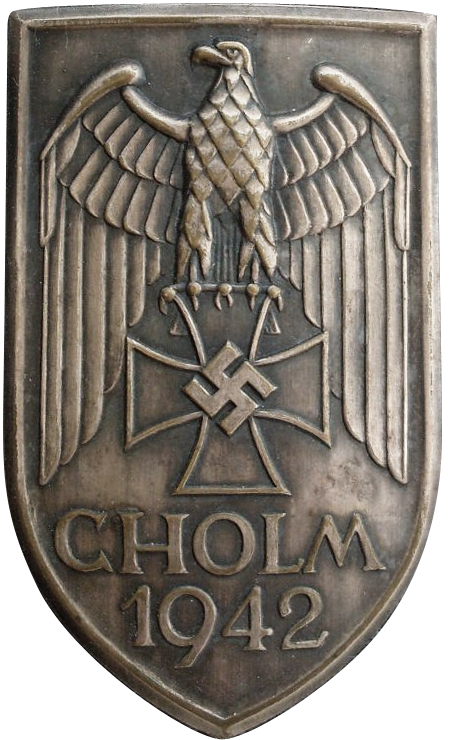
- Cholm Shield
- Type: Badge
- Awarded for: Defence of the Cholm Pocket
- Description: Commemorative shield worn on the upper left sleeve of uniform
- Presented by: Nazi Germany
- Eligibility: Wehrmacht personnel
- Campaign: World War II
- Status: Obsolete
- Established: 1 July 1942
- Final award: 1 April 1943

Highlights
- Total recipients: Approximately 5,500

The Cholm Shield (German: Cholmschild) was a World War II German military decoration awarded to those who fought in the Cholm Pocket on the Eastern Front between 21 January and 5 May 1942. It was instituted on 1 July 1942 and is the rarest of the German combat shields, with approximately 5,500 recipients. Awards ceased to be bestowed on 1 April 1943.

== Background and design ==
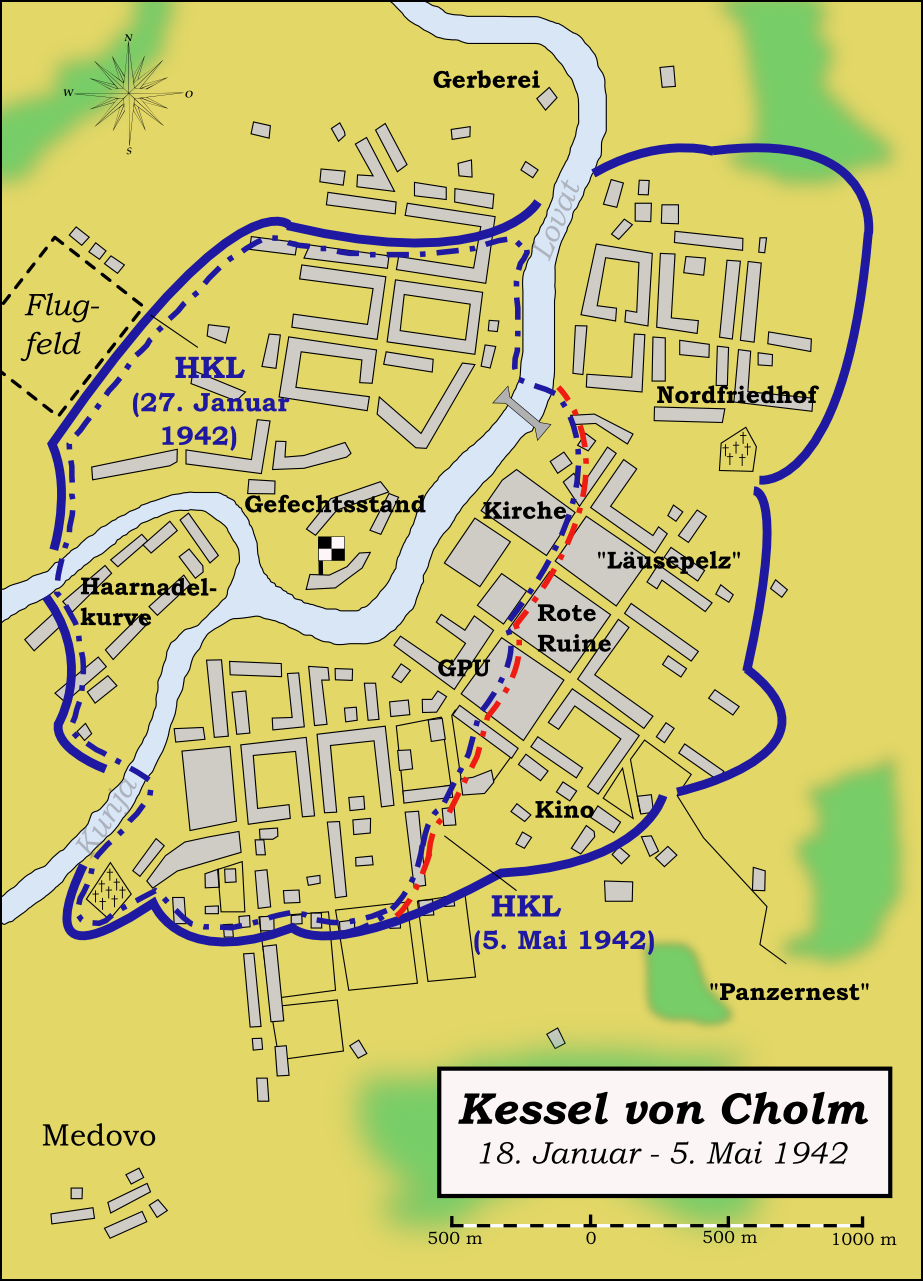
Map of the Cholm pocket showing the encircled German troops.

In January 1942, the Soviet Red Army began a series of counteroffensives against the German Army. In the course of these operations, the German occupied town of Cholm (or Kholm) was attacked on 18 January 1942. By the 21 January the town was surrounded and cut off, creating the Cholm Pocket. Led by Generalmajor Theodor Scherer, a mixed group of Wehrmacht Heer, Luftwaffe Fallschirmjager, Waffen-SS panzergrenadiers and Ordnungspolizei personnel were supplied by air until relieved on 5 May 1942.

After the relief of Cholm, a commemorative shield was suggested by General Scherer to Adolf Hitler, who agreed to the award. A design by Polizei-Rottwachtmeister Schlimmer, a veteran of the pocket, was then approved by Hitler, with some minor changes made by Professor Richard Klein.

The award features a shield, 38mm wide and 65mm high, with a large "open-winged" Wehrmacht-style eagle grasping an Iron Cross with a swastika at its centre. Below this is written CHOLM in capitals, and then the date 1942. The shields were hollow stamped metal washed in silver. A backing plate was attached with a number of prongs, and affixed to a piece of coloured cloth that matched the colour of the uniform of the recipient's arm of service.

After an initial ban, the Federal Republic of Germany re-authorised the wear of many World War II military decorations in 1957. These included the Cholm Shield, re-designed by removing the swastika emblem from the centre of the Iron Cross. Members of the Bundeswehr could wear the shield on the ribbon bar, represented by a small replica of the award on a field grey ribbon.

== Criteria for award ==
To receive the shield, military personnel had, between 21 January and 5 May 1942, to have:

- served honourably within the Cholm Pocket; or
- flown and landed at the airfield within the pocket for resupply operations. Merely dropping supplies from the air did not qualify.

The Cholm Shield was worn on the left upper sleeve of the uniform of soldiers and airmen. Those with two campaign shields would wear them one above the other, separated by half a cm. Holders of three shields wore the earliest received uppermost, with the remaining two worn beside each other below. For civilian clothes, a smaller shield roughly 16mm across with a needle fitting could be worn on the left lapel.

== See also ==
- Campaign shields (Wehrmacht)
- Crimea Shield
- Demyansk Shield
- Kuban Shield
- Lapland Shield
- Narvik Shield
- Warsaw Shield
