= Friedrich Hochbaum =

- Born: 7 August 1894; Magdeburg, Province of Saxony, German Empire
- Died: 28 January 1955 (aged 60); Voikovo prison camp, Ivanovo, Russian SFSR, Soviet Union
- Military career
- Allegiance: German Empire; Weimar Republic; Nazi Germany
- Branch: German Army
- Service years: 1913–1945
- Rank: General der Infanterie
- Commands: 34th Infantry Division; XVIII Army Corps
- Conflicts: World War I; World War II; Battle of France; Operation Barbarossa; Battle of Białystok–Minsk; Battle of Smolensk (1941); Battle of Moscow; Battle of Kursk; Dnieper–Carpathian Offensive; Cherkassy Pocket; Uman–Botoşani Offensive; East Pomeranian Offensive
- Awards: Knight's Cross of the Iron Cross with Oak Leaves

Friedrich Hochbaum (7 August 1894 – 28 January 1955) was a German general during World War II. He was a recipient of the Knight's Cross of the Iron Cross with Oak Leaves of Nazi Germany. Hochbaum surrendered to Soviet troops in May 1945 and died in captivity in January 1955.

== Awards and decorations ==
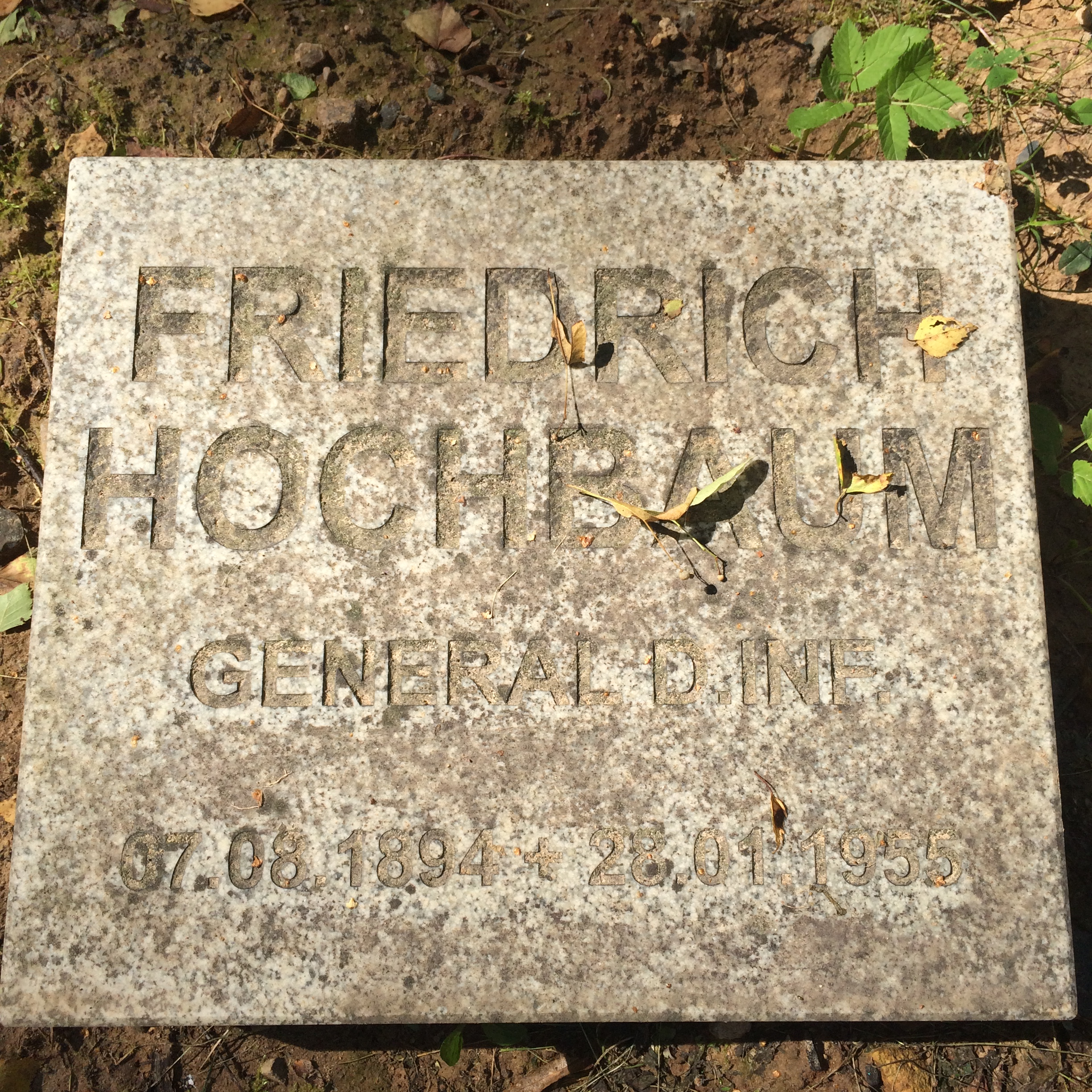
Tombstone of Friedrich Hochbaum at German War Cemetery Cherntsy

- Iron Cross (1914) 2nd Class (10 October 1914) & 1st Class (5 August 1916)
- Clasp to the Iron Cross (1939) 2nd Class (3 July 1941) & 1st Class (21 August 1941)
- German Cross in Gold on 25 April 1942 as Oberst in Infanterie-Regiment 253
- Knight's Cross of the Iron Cross with Oak Leaves
  - Knight's Cross on 22 August 1943 as Generalleutnant and commander of 34. Infanterie-Division
  - Oak Leaves on 4 June 1944 as Generalleutnant and commander of 34. Infanterie-Division

Military offices
Preceded by Generalleutnant Theodor Scherer	Commander of 34. Infanterie-Division; 2 November 1942 – 31 May 1944	Succeeded by Generalleutnant Theobald Lieb
Preceded by General der Gebirgstruppe Karl Eglseer	Commander of XVIII. Gebirgs-Armeekorps; 24 June 1944 – 9 May 1945	Succeeded by none
