= Crimea Shield =

WW2 German military decoration

Crimea Shield Krimschild
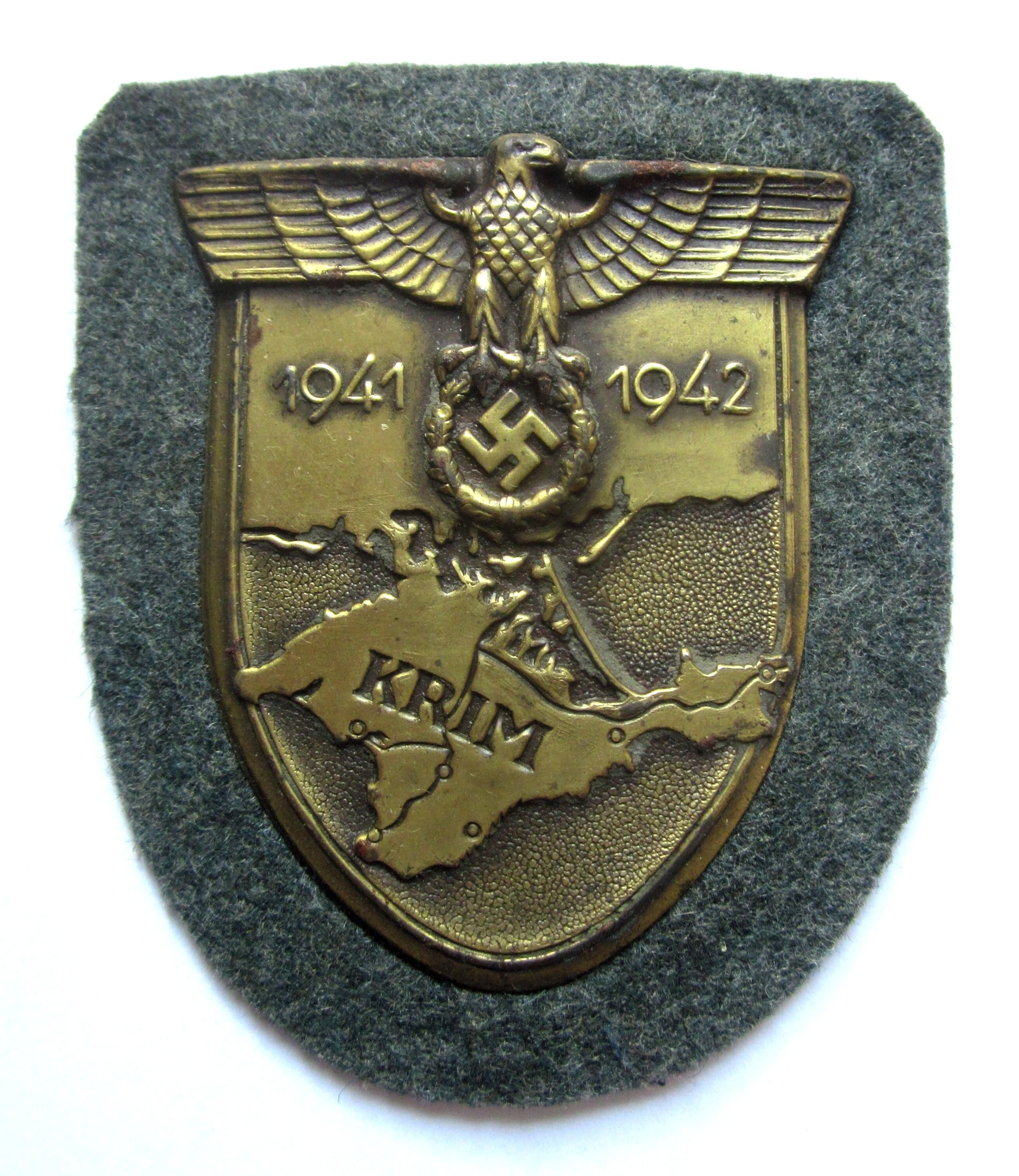
- Shield with field grey backing for award to the Army
- Type: Badge
- Awarded for: Active service during the Crimea campaign
- Presented by: Nazi Germany
- Eligibility: Military personnel
- Campaign: World War II
- Status: Obsolete
- Established: 25 July 1942
- Final award: October 1943

Highlights
- Total: Approximately 250,000
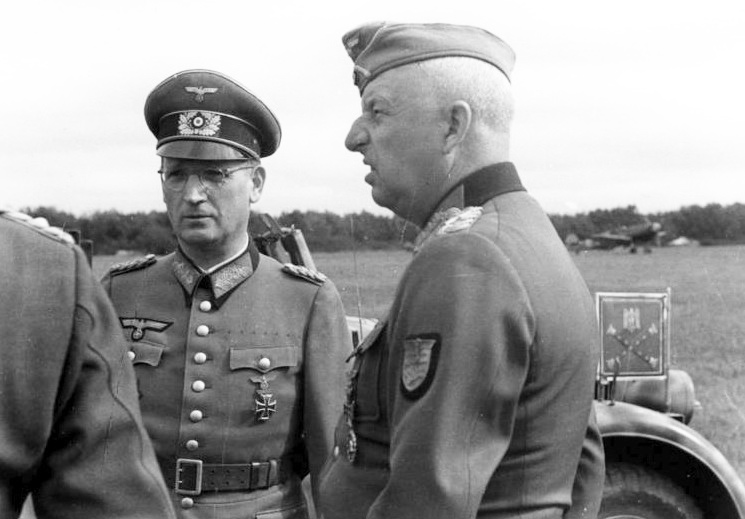
- Field Marshal Erich von Manstein (right) wearing the Crimea Shield on his tunic

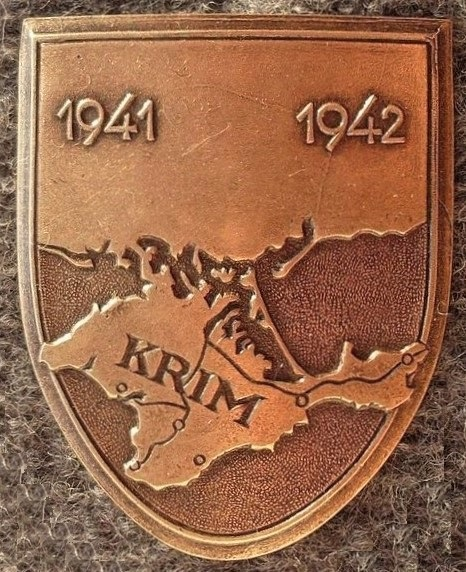
Post-war 'de-nazified' issue

The Crimea Shield (German: Krimschild) was a World War II German military decoration. It was awarded to military personnel under the command of Field Marshal von Manstein, including supporting naval and air force units, who fought against Soviet Red Army forces between 21 September 1941 and 4 July 1942 and who captured the Crimea region (Krim in German). It was instituted on 25 July 1942. It was the most widely distributed of the various German campaign shields, with approximately 250,000 awarded.

== Design ==
The Wehrmacht's Army Group South advanced through the Crimean peninsula between the Autumn of 1941 and Summer of 1942. To commemorate the hostilities that ended with the German capture of Sevastopol on 4 July 1942, the Crimea Shield was created for all members of the armed forces under area commander Field Marshal Erich von Manstein.

The shield is of stamped sheet metal with a bronze finish. It is headed by the German eagle clutching a laurel wreath surrounding a swastika, flanked by the dates 1941 and 1942. This sits on a backdrop of the Crimean peninsula, bearing the word KRIM. It was issued mounted on a cloth backing that matched the uniform of the appropriate armed service: army, navy or air force, and sewn onto the left upper sleeve of the tunic and greatcoat. Where the recipient received more than one campaign shield, the earlier was worn above any later awards.

After an initial ban, the Federal Republic of Germany re-authorised the wear of many World War II military decorations in 1957. These included the Crimea Shield, re-designed by removing the eagle and swastika emblem. Members of the Bundeswehr could wear the shield on the ribbon bar, represented by a small replica of the award on a field grey ribbon.

== Criteria for award ==
The Crimea Shield could be awarded to all members of the Wehrmacht and to Luftwaffe and other units affiliated to the campaign between 21 September 1941 and 4 July 1942. The following conditions needed to have been met for the award:

- served in the area for at least 90 days; or
- been wounded while serving in the area; or
- been engaged in at least one major operation against the enemy.

Romanian troops serving in the Crimea were also eligible.

== Gold version ==
A special pure-gold version of the Crimea Shield was also produced. It was first bestowed upon Marshal Ion Antonescu, the military dictator of Romania, at the end of the Siege of Sevastopol (3 July 1942). It was awarded to him in Bucharest by Erich von Manstein, on Adolf Hitler's behalf. The second and last Golden Krimschild was awarded to von Manstein himself, on 24 November 1942.

== See also ==
- Campaign shields (Wehrmacht)
- Cholm Shield
- Demyansk Shield
- Kuban Shield
- Lapland Shield
- Narvik Shield
- Warsaw Shield
