= Warsaw Shield =

Warsaw Shield Warschauschild
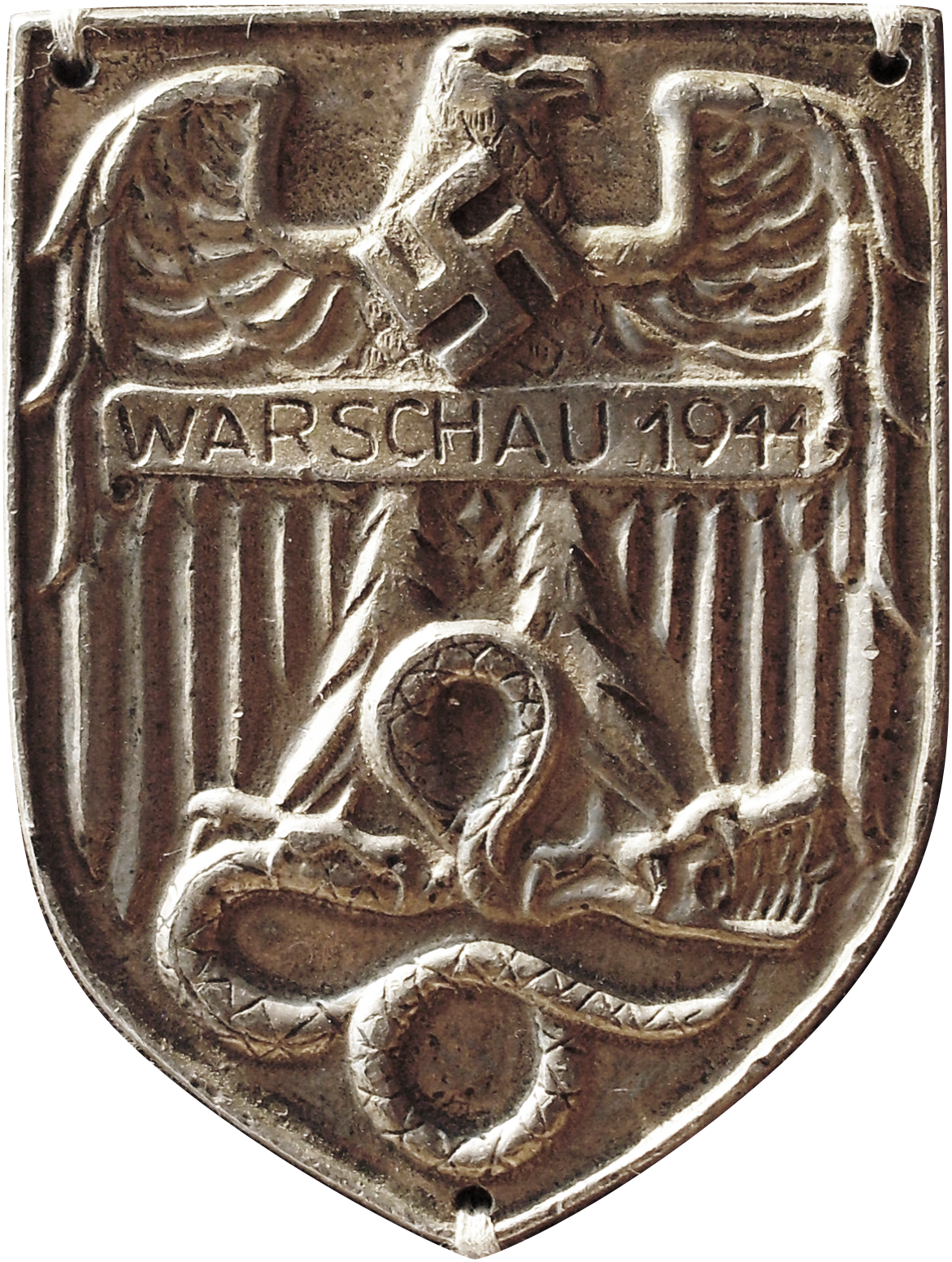
- Post-war reproduction showing approved design
- Type: Badge
- Awarded for: Active service during Warsaw Uprising
- Description: Bronze shield for wear on left upper arm of uniform
- Presented by: Nazi Germany
- Eligibility: Wehrmacht and Waffen-SS personnel
- Campaign: World War II
- Status: Approved, but never manufactured
- Established: 10 December 1944

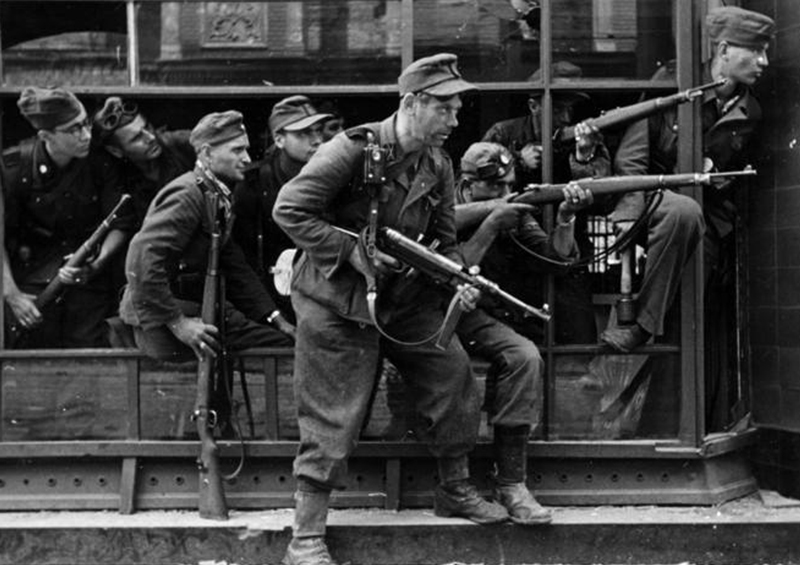
Members of SS-Sonderregiment Dirlewanger during the uprising

The Warsaw Shield, (German: Warschauschild), or Warsaw Arm Shield (German: Ärmelschild Warschau), was a planned World War II German military decoration intended for award to Wehrmacht and Waffen-SS servicemen who took part in the suppression of the 1944 Warsaw Uprising. Although authorised, with the conditions of award and the design approved and announced, production had not begun prior to the end of the war and the award was never issued.

It was one of a number of campaign shields authorised by the German authorities during the war.

== Criteria for award ==
The Warsaw Uprising lasted 63 days from 1 August 1944. The Polish resistance attempted to liberate Warsaw as German forces withdrew. However, the approaching Red Army temporarily halted outside the city, enabling the Germans to regroup and defeat the uprising. During the fighting German forces committed numerous atrocities, and then razed the city in reprisal.

The Warsaw Shield was instituted on 10 December 1944 by Adolf Hitler, with full award regulations published in the Reich Law Gazette. It was to be "awarded as a battle badge to members of the armed forces and non-military personnel who, between 1 August and 2 October 1944 were honourably engaged in the fighting in Warsaw". The award was to be made by SS-Obergruppenfuhrer Erich von dem Bach-Zelewski, who had overall commanded during the operation.

Service between 1 August and 2 October 1944 qualified for the shield provided that the recipient had:

- spent at least seven days in combat; or
- served at least 28 days in the combat area in a non-combat capacity; or
- flown at least 20 Luftwaffe missions over the combat zone.

There was no minimum period if the recipient had been wounded in action or decorated for gallantry.

Foreign volunteers serving alongside German forces qualified on the same basis.

== Design ==
The award was to be a 50 × 62 mm bronze-coloured shield showing a large Wehrmacht-style eagle with folded wings grasping a writhing snake. A mobile swastika is superimposed on the eagle's neck with, immediately below, a narrow banner with the legend WARSCHAU 1944. It was designed by Benno von Arent, his still-existing original artwork confirming the design.

The shield was to be worn on the left upper arm of the uniform. Dies were prepared, but were destroyed in an air-raid and no shields were actually produced before the end of the war. However, some sample matrices for the shield survived and have been used as the basis for the post-war manufacture of unofficial examples.

== Post war ==
Wearing Nazi era decorations was banned after Germany's defeat in 1945, and the Warsaw Shield was not among those World War II military decorations authorised for wear by the Federal Republic of Germany in 1957. This means that examples produced since the war have no official standing, and public wear of the shield in its original form with the swastika would not be allowed under German law.

== See also ==
- Warsaw Uprising
- Orders, decorations, and medals of Nazi Germany
- Campaign shields (Wehrmacht)
- Crimea Shield
- Cholm Shield
- Demyansk Shield
- Kuban Shield
- Lapland Shield
- Narvik Shield
