= Narvik Shield =

Narvik Shield Narvikschild
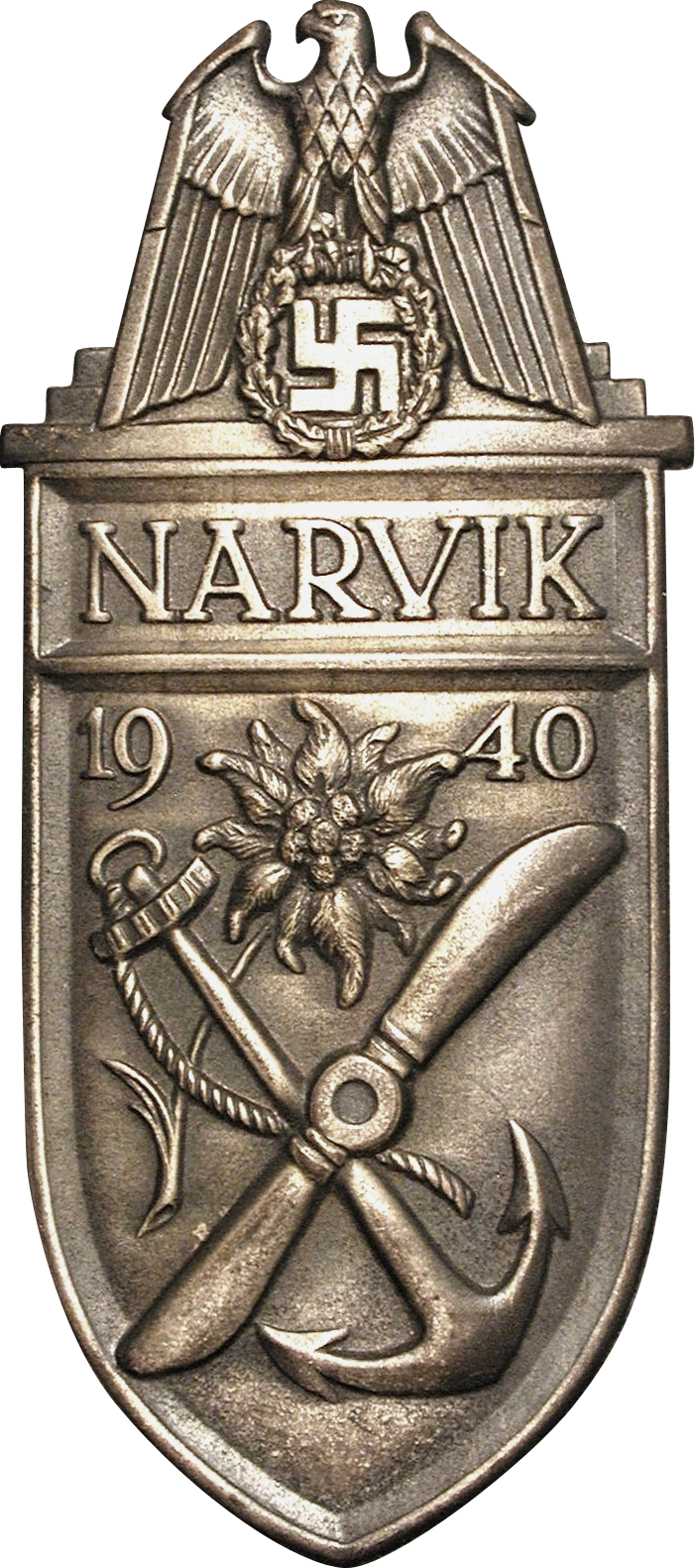
- Narvik Shield in silver
- Type: Badge
- Awarded for: Taking part in the Battles of Narvik
- Presented by: Nazi Germany
- Eligibility: Military personnel
- Campaign: World War II
- Status: Obsolete
- Established: 19 August 1940
- First award: Eduard Dietl 21 March 1941
- Final award: 15 June 1943

Highlights
- Total: 8,577
- Total awarded posthumously: 680
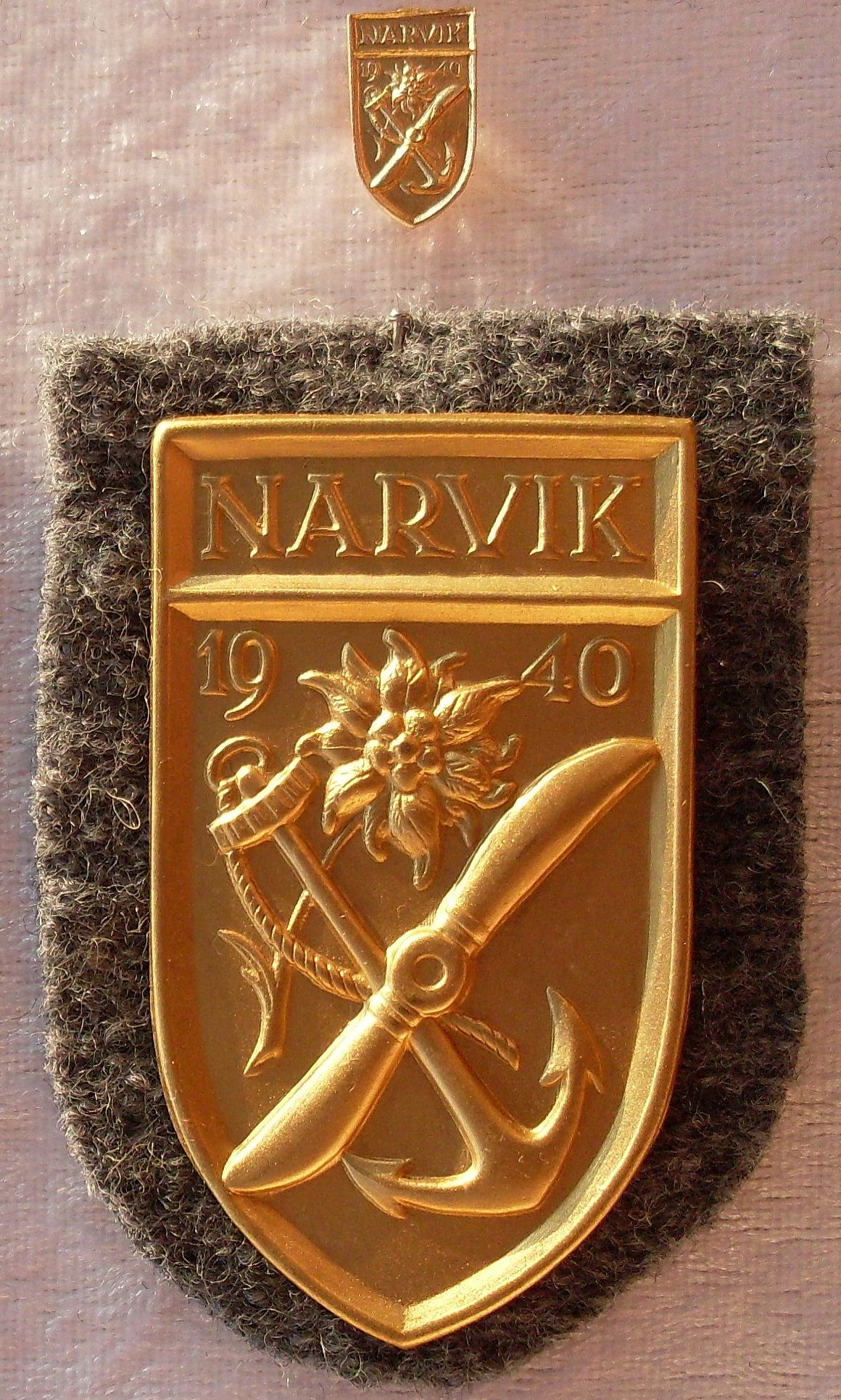
- 1957 version in gilt

The Narvik Shield (German: Narvikschild) was a World War II German military decoration awarded to all German forces that took part in the battles of Narvik between 9 April and 8 June 1940. It was instituted on 19 August 1940 by Adolf Hitler. The Oberkommando der Wehrmacht (OKW) published the order the same day. It was bestowed by General Eduard Dietl, the commander of Army Group Narvik.

The award was the first of a series of arm shield campaign awards. A total of 8,577 personnel received the award. Specifically: 2,755 to the army, 3,661 to the Kriegsmarine, and 2,161 to the Luftwaffe.

== Design ==
Designed by Professor Dr. Richard Klein of Munich, the shield is narrow with a pointed base and, at its apex, has an eagle with down-swept wings clutching a laurel wreath that surrounds a swastika. Below this in capital letters is written NARVIK. The body of the shield features an edelweiss (representing the army mountain troops), an anchor (representing the Kriegsmarine), and propeller (for the Luftwaffe). The anchor and propeller are crossed, with the edelweiss placed at the top of the X. The numbers 19 and 40 appear at the top corners of the main body of the shield.

The shield was hollow backed and stamped from sheet metal which was usually zinc. The shield was awarded in two versions: silver-gray for the army and Luftwaffe, and a gilded (golden coloured) version for Kriegsmarine. It was mounted on a cloth backing corresponding to the colour of the uniform, and worn on the upper left arm of the uniform.

=== 1957 version ===
In 1957, the Narvik Shield, along with many other German World War II military decorations, was reauthorized for wear by qualifying veterans. This included members of the Bundeswehr, who could wear the shield on the ribbon bar, represented by a small replica of the award on a field grey ribbon. The new version was re-designed to remove the Nazi eagle and swastika symbol from the top of the shield.

== See also ==
- Campaign shields (Wehrmacht)
- Cholm Shield
- Crimea Shield
- Demyansk Shield
- Kuban Shield
- Lapland Shield
- Warsaw Shield
