= Kuban Shield =

WW2 German military decoration

Kuban Shield Ärmelschild Kuban
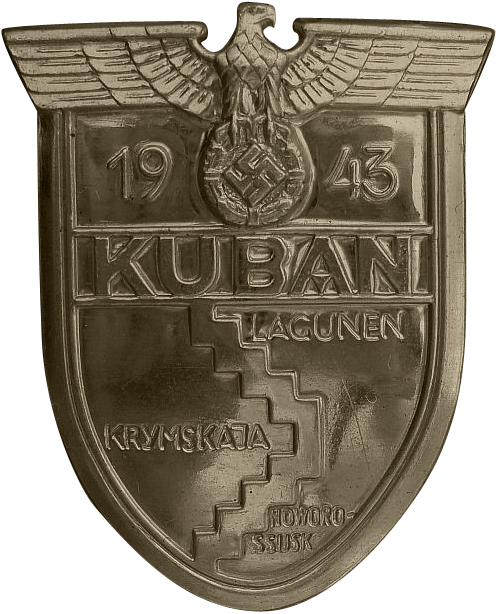
- Kuban Shield
- Type: Badge
- Awarded for: Fighting at the Kuban bridgehead, February to October 1943
- Presented by: Nazi Germany
- Eligibility: Wehrmacht personnel
- Campaign: World War II
- Status: Obsolete
- Established: 21 September 1943

Highlights
- Total recipients: c. 50,000

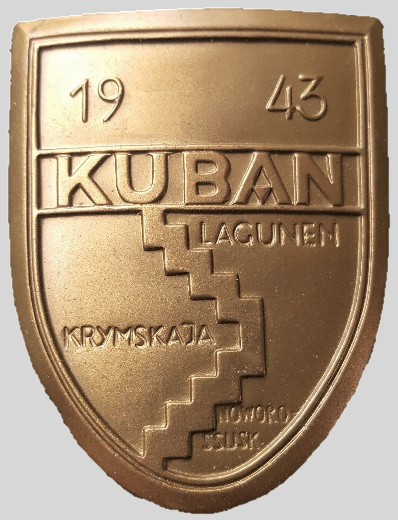
Post-war 'de-nazified' version

The Kuban Shield (German: Ärmelschild Kuban) was a World War II military decoration of Nazi Germany. It was awarded to Wehrmacht forces who fought at the Kuban bridgehead in the Soviet Union from February 1943 until it was abandoned in October 1943. The award was instituted on 21 September 1943.

== Design ==
The shield was struck in sheet metal or zinc and treated with a bronzed wash. Similar in design to the Crimea Shield, it features a German eagle with outstretched wings clutching a laurel wreath containing a swastika. On each side the wreath are the numbers 19 and 43. Directly below the eagle is written KUBAN in block capitals. Below this is a stylized map of the Kuban region, with a line representing the defensive line that the men fought to preserve with three locations on the bridgehead marked - KRYMSKAJA, LAGUNEN ('the lagoon'), and NOWOROSSIJSK. The shield measures 52 mm (2.0 in) wide and 62 mm (2.4 in) in height.

A back plate, which held in place a piece of cloth matching the recipients’ branch of service, was applied to the shield:

- Green for Heer (army)
- Blue for Luftwaffe (air force)
- Black for Panzer (armoured) units

The shield was worn on the upper left sleeve of the tunic. Where the recipient received more than one campaign shield, the earlier was worn above any later awards.

After an initial ban, the Federal Republic of Germany re-authorised the wear of many World War II military decorations in 1957. These included the Kuban Shield, re-designed by removing the eagle and swastika emblem. Members of the Bundeswehr could wear the shield on the ribbon bar, represented by a small replica of the award on a field grey ribbon.

== Criteria for award ==
The shield was awarded for service at the Kuban Bridgehead between 1 February 1943 and 9 October 1943, when the bridgehead was finally evacuated. To qualify, Army personnel had to have:

- served at the bridgehead for 60 days, or
- been wounded while defending the bridgehead, or
- been engaged in a single major operation at the bridgehead.

Qualification by members of the German Navy and Air Force was determined by a points system, with points gained for different operations against, and contact with, the enemy.

Approximately 50,000 service personnel qualified for the shield, with up to five examples issued to each recipient, enabling them to be permanently attached to each tunic and greatcoat.

== See also ==
- Campaign shields (Wehrmacht)
- Cholm Shield
- Crimea Shield
- Demyansk Shield
- Lapland Shield
- Narvik Shield
- Warsaw Shield
