= Lapland Shield =

WW2 German military decoration

Lapland Shield Lapplandschild
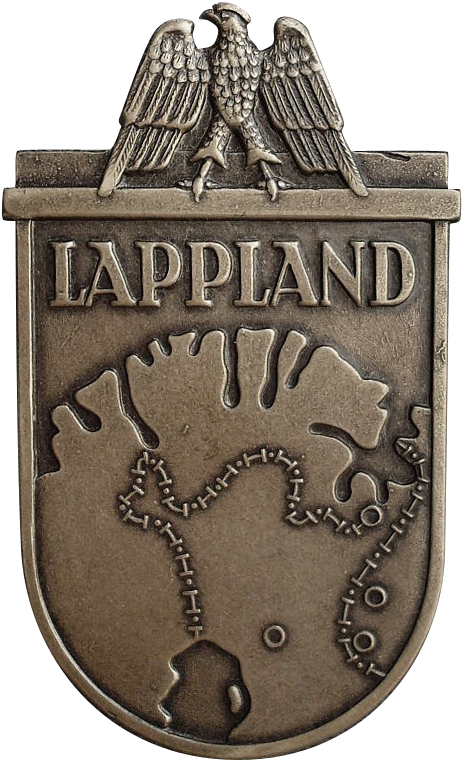
- Post-war produced example of the shield
- Type: Badge
- Awarded for: Actions against the Finnish and Soviet forces in Lapland, Finland
- Description: Commemorative shield worn on upper left sleeve of uniform
- Presented by: Nazi Germany
- Eligibility: Military personnel
- Campaigns: Lapland War (part of World War II)
- Status: Obsolete
- Established: February 1945

The Lapland Shield (German: Lapplandschild) was a World War II German military decoration awarded to military personnel of General Franz Böhme’s 20th Mountain Army which fought a two-front campaign against the advancing Finnish Defence Forces and the Soviet Red Army in the Lapland War, Finland between September 1944 and April 1945. It was awarded to men who had "honorably served" for six months in the region or had been wounded during operations there. It was authorized in February 1945 and was the last officially instituted German campaign shield of the war.

With the shield having been approved and designed shortly before the war's end, early recipients had the award noted in their military pay book in March 1945. However, presentation of the shield only began in July 1945, after Germany's surrender, with some awards recorded in pay books as late as August 1945.

== Design ==
A basic shield with flat top and rounded base, it incorporates an eagle at the top but without a swastika. Directly below this, is "LAPPLAND" in capital letters, with a map of the region beneath. The shield has four circles marked to represent the locations of Rovaniemi, Petsamo, Kuolajärvi (former Salla(nsuu)) and Alakurtti.

At the end of the war, while the disarmed German forces in Lapland were awaiting repatriation, they remained under the command of their own officers and had a functioning military bureaucracy. Although authorized earlier, it was only in this immediate post-war period that the Lapland Shield was manufactured and distributed. Locally produced, the awards were crudely made with variations in style and metal, with most made of aluminum or zinc. This post-war manufacture may explain the absence of the swastika symbol from the final design. It was the only shield without a back-plate or uniform cloth.

The Lapland Shield was not among those Nazi era military decorations authorized for official wear by the Federal Republic of Germany in 1957.

== See also ==
- Campaign shields (Wehrmacht)
- Cholm Shield
- Crimea Shield
- Demyansk Shield
- Kuban Shield
- Narvik Shield
- Warsaw Shield
