= 34th Infantry Division (Wehrmacht) =

- 34. Infanterie-Division
- Active: 1936-1945
- Country: Nazi Germany
- Branch: German Army
- Size: Division
- Garrison/HQ: Heidelberg
- Engagements: Saar Offensive; Battle of France; Operation Barbarossa; Second Battle of the Alps

Commanders
- Notable commanders: Erich Lüdke, Theodor Scherer

The 34th Infantry Division, (German: 34. Infanterie-Division), was a German military unit that fought in the Battle of France and on the Eastern Front during World War II. The division was first formed following the expansion of the army under Adolf Hitler's leadership, but finally disbanded following their surrender to the Americans in Italy.

== History ==
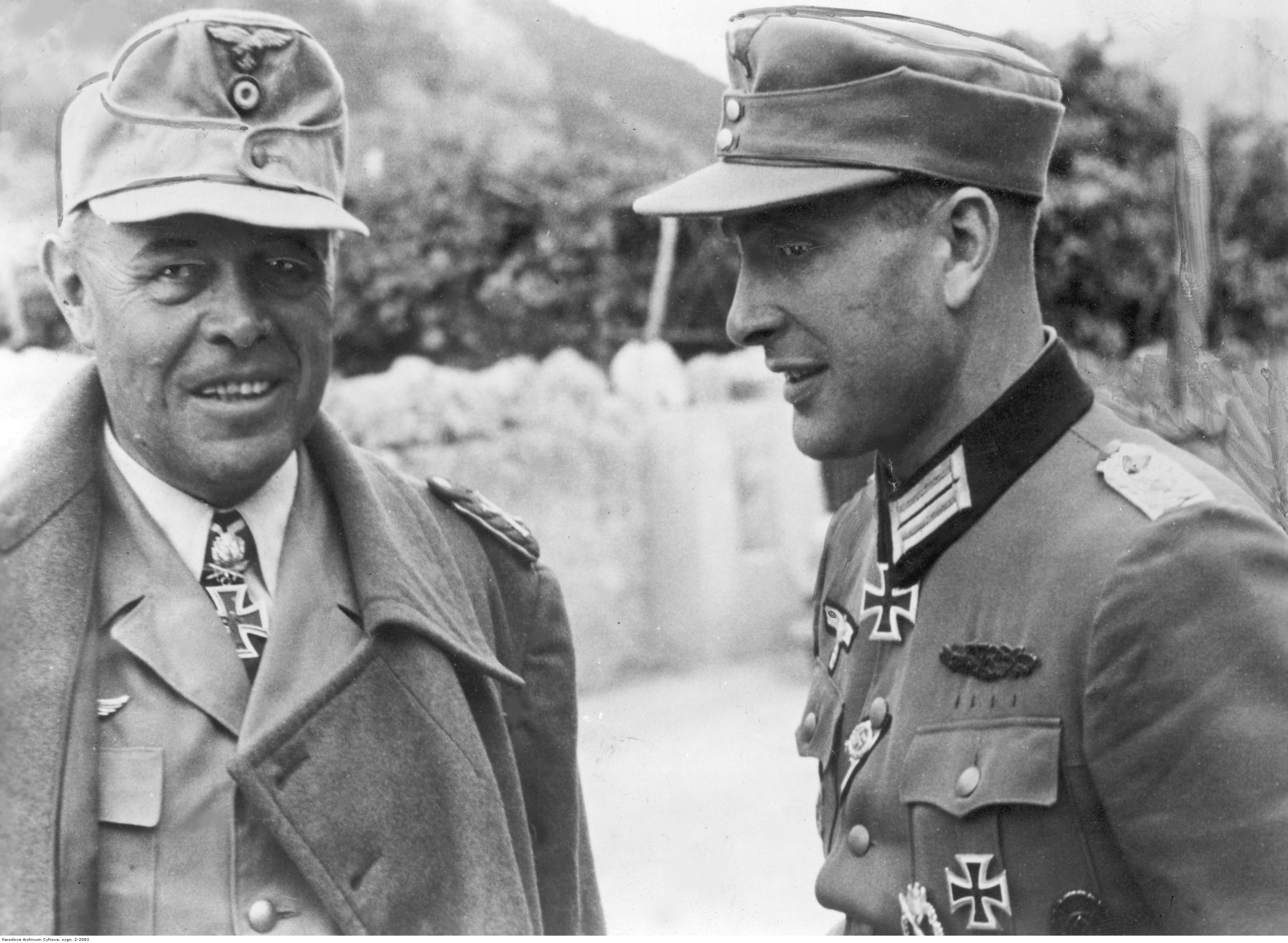
Marshal Albert Kesselring (left) and the commander of the 253rd Infantry Regiment and future divisional commander, Colonel Ferdinand Hippel, on the Italian Front, September 1944.

The 34th Infantry Division was formed between 1935 and 36 during the rapid expansion of the army following the withdrawal from the Treaty of Versailles. The division was set up within Wehrkreis XII and based in Heidelberg. When recruiting originally, the division was mostly made up of men from the area of the Rhineland and Hesse. After mobilisation just before the Invasion of Poland, the division was based in Trier and on both sides of Saarlautern. While being based in the area, the division was assigned to defence group of the Westwall.

On September 19 the 105th Infantry Regiment and 2nd Battalion of the 34th Artillery Regiment were moved to form the new 72nd Infantry Division, with the 105th being replaced by the new formed 253rd infantry regiment. The second artillery battalion was replaced by light artillery group of the 749th artillery regiment. After small skirmishes with the French during the Saar Offensive, they were in the region of Eifel. Following the start of the Western Campaign on 10 May 1940, the division moved through Luxembourg City to the area between Longwy and Dudelingen where they were assigned to flank protection for the northern Maginot Line.

During the second phase of the invasion, the division made its way to Aisne where they forced the French across the river back to Reims and the Marne. The division finally made it to the Loire and finally ended up in Allier after the ceasefire. Following the ceasefire the division was moved to the demarcation line on security duties, and by July was part of the occupation force based in Boulogne where they were tasked with coastal defence duties. In December the third battalions of all regiments were relinquished and replaced by fresh troops. In May 1941 the division was transported by rail to Poland and delivered to Brest-Litovsk in preparation for the Russian Campaign.

On 22 June 1941, Operation Barbarossa was launched and the division easily broke through the defensive line around the town and pushed to Beresina and finally the Dnieper south of Mogilev. From this point, the division crossed the river and by the beginning of September was in Bryansk. The division was engaged in almost continuous fighting in Russia over the next three years. After heavy losses in the vicinity of the Cherkassy Pocket at the Hnyly Tikych river south of Zhashkiv and during battles around Uman, the division had to be replenished in May 1944 by the Schatten Division Neuhammer.

In July 1944 the division was transferred to Armeeabteilung Zangen in Italy, around Genoa.

The division fought in the Second Battle of the Alps and capitulated in April 1945.

== Order of Battle ==
The structure of the division was as follows;

- Divisional Staff
- 24th Signal Battalion
- 34th Reconnaissance Battalion
- 80th Infantry Regiment
- 105th Infantry Regiment (replaced by 253rd Infantry Regiment after mobilisation in 1939)
- 107th Infantry Regiment
- 34th Field Replacement Battalion
- 34th Artillery Regiment (originally 3 battalions, later 4)
- 34th Anti-Tank Battalion (Panzerjäger)
- 34th Engineer Battalion
- 34th Divisional Supply and Support Column

== Commanding officers ==
- Generalleutnant Erich Lüdke, 1 April 1936 – 1 October 1937
- Generalmajor Max von Viebahn, 1 October 1937 – 1 March 1938
- Generalleutnant Friedrich Bremer, 1 March 1938 – 1 April 1939
- General der Artillerie Hans Behlendorff, 19 July 1939 – 10 May 1940
- Generalleutnant Werner Sanne, 11 May 1940 – 1 November 1940
- General der Artillerie Hans Behlendorff, 1 November 1940 – 18 October 1941
- Generalleutnant Friedrich Fürst, 18 October 1941 – 5 September 1942
- Generalleutnant Theodor Scherer, 5 September 1942 – 2 November 1942
- General der Infanterie Friedrich Hochbaum, 2 November 1942 – 31 May 1944
- Generalleutnant Theobald Lieb, 31 May 1944 – 1945
- Oberst Ferdinand Hippel, 1945

== War crimes ==
Elements of the division have been implicated in the Grugliasco massacre, Piedmont, alongside the 5th Mountain Division, where, on 30 April 1945, 67 civilians were executed.

On 7 December 1944 a patrol of the division, led by a local spy, broke into the "Vittoria" hotel in the village of Grimaldi, municipality of Ventimiglia, and captured three families who had found shelter there. The twelve prisoners were then taken out of the hotel and shot there.
