= 281st Security Division =

281st Infantry Division
- Active: March 1941 – May 1945
- Country: Nazi Germany
- Branch: Army (Wehrmacht)
- Type: Infantry
- Role: Rear-security division
- Size: Division
- Engagements: Eastern Front; Bandenbekämpfung

Commanders
- Notable commanders: Theodor Scherer

281st Security Division (281. Sicherungs-Division) was a rear-security division in the Wehrmacht of Nazi Germany. Established in 1941, the unit was deployed in German-occupied areas of the Soviet Union, in the Army Group North Rear Area. The unit was converted to an infantry division in 1945, while stationed in Courland.

== Operational history ==
Formed in March 1941, the 281st Security Division served in Army Group North Rear Area, in Northern Russia. The division extensively participated in war crimes; the divisional personnel had to be reminded by their commanders on 5 August 1941 to not comment on their various mass shootings in their writings or in conversations with civilians.

In early 1942, commanded by General Theodor Scherer, elements of the division were encircled by the Soviet forces at Kholm in what became known as the Kholm Pocket. The pocket was relieved after four months. For the next two years, it was stationed in the northern sector and engaged in rear-area security and anti-partisan operations, although elements of the division saw action at the front line. One of the major anti-partisan operations it engaged in was Operation Frühjahrsbestellung in April 1943. It was destroyed in mid-1944.

It was reconstituted in Courland in January 1945 as the 281st Infantry Division. It retreated to the Oder River, where in May it surrendered with the rest of the 3rd Panzer Army.

== Commanders ==
- Generalleutnant Friedrich Bayer: March - October 1941
- Generalmajor Theodor Scherer: October 1941 - June 1942
- Generalmajor Wilhelm-Hunold von Stockhausen: June - December 1942
- Generalmajor Bruno Scultetus: December 1942 - May 1943
- Generalleutnant Wilhelm-Hunold von Stockhausen: May 1943 - July 1944
- Generalmajor Bruno Ortner: July 1944
- Generalmajor Alois Windisch: July - September 1944
- Generalmajor Bruno Ortner: September 1944 - April 1945
- Oberst Schmidt: April - May 1945
