= Theodor Scherer =

German general

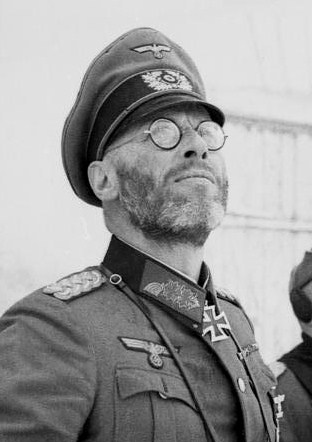
- Born: 17 September 1889; Höchstädt an der Donau, Bavaria, German Empire
- Died: 17 May 1951 (aged 61); Ludwigsburg, Baden-Württemberg, West Germany
- Military career
- Allegiance: German Empire; Nazi Germany
- Branch: Imperial German Army; German Army
- Service years: 1908–1920; 1935–1945
- Rank: Generalleutnant
- Commands: 281st Security Division
- Conflicts: World War I World War II
- Awards: Knight's Cross of the Iron Cross with Oak Leaves

Theodor Scherer (17 September 1889 – 17 May 1951) was a German lieutenant general and divisional commander in the Wehrmacht during World War II.

== Biography ==
=== Early life and career ===
Scherer was born at Höchstädt an der Donau on 17 September 1889. In July 1908, he enlisted as cadet officer in the Bavarian Army which served as part of the Imperial German Army. He was commissioned as lieutenant in the 12th Bavarian Infantry Regiment in 1910. He fought in World War I, and was captured by the British in July 1916 during the Battle of the Somme. Upon returning to his home country after the war, he was not retained in Germany's post-war military, the Reichswehr. In 1920, Scherer became a police officer in Bavaria. In 1935, he rejoined the German Army, and was appointed Lieutenant-Colonel.

By the start of World War II, Scherer had risen to Colonel and operated as a regimental commander at the Western Front. He led an infantry assault during the Wehrmacht's crossing of the Marne in June 1940. In March 1941, he was entrusted with the security of Adolf Hitler's headquarters.

=== Eastern Front in World War II ===
As Soviet partisans increasingly became an issue at the Eastern Front, Scherer was placed in command of 281st Security Division in October 1941, and tasked with destroying local partisan forces. At the time, the 281st Security Division was stationed in Kholm in the occupied Soviet Union. The security divisions were not frontline combat formations, but were posted to the rear area and engaged in eliminating any form of resistance, real or imagined, including partisans, communists, Red Army stragglers, Jews and Roma. Based on the 281st Security Division's records, journalist Johann Althaus characterized it as a typical unit of the war of annihilation, more experienced in killing civilians and eliminating badly armed opponents than fighting battles. In January 1942, the division, along with other Wehrmacht and police units, was attacked by partisans at Kholm. Scherer had not yet arrived at the town by the start of the attack, and thus took control of the Security Division elements and other troops in the area to relieve Kholm. Even after the Germans had secured the town itself, they remained encircled by the Red Army in what was called the "Kholm Pocket". For the duration of the pocket, Scherer became the chief commander of the encircled force, initially about 3,500 strong. Historian Robert Forczyk characterized him as a "soldier's soldier" who was able to motivate his troops even under "extreme conditions".

His force was gradually reinforced by other Wehrmacht units which were in retreat in the face of a Soviet offensive. "Kampfgruppe Scherer" thus grew to about 6,000 men. He repeatedly attempted to coordinate with other German forces to facilitate a breakthrough to relief his troops, while countering Soviet assaults and organizing the evacuation of wounded soldiers. Scherer also hoped for aerial support, requesting assistance by paratroopers on 19 February 1942 as his force was close to being overwhelmed. However, the Wehrmacht could only spare a token force; despite this, the Soviets eventually reduced their attacks. On 20 February 1942, Scherer was decorated with the Knight's Cross of the Iron Cross. Althaus argued that the medal was probably supposed to lessen Scherer's anger about the lack of support for his force. Scherer's force was finally relieved on 5 May 1942. About 5,500 survivors of the pocket were also decorated with the newly created Cholm Shield; it has been alleged that Scherer himself designed the medal, although this is unconfirmed.

Scherer was subsequently appointed commander of the 34th and then the 83rd Infantry Division, as well as promoted to major general. At the time of him assuming command of the 83rd Infantry Division in November 1942, the unit had been mostly encircled during the Battle of Velikiye Luki. Scherer was located outside this pocket and attempted to save his unit, but the 83rd Infantry Division was mostly destroyed in January 1943. In April 1944, Scherer was made Inspector of Coastal Defences for the Eastern Front, a position he held until the end of the war. By this point, he had risen to Generalleutnant. He was killed in a car accident at Ludwigsburg on 17 May 1951.

== Awards and decorations ==
- Iron Cross (1914) 2nd Class (26 August 1914) & 1st Class (17 January 1920)
- Clasp to the Iron Cross (1939) 2nd Class & 1st Class (20 June 1940)
- Knight's Cross of the Iron Cross with Oak Leaves
  - Knight's Cross on 20 February 1942 as Generalmajor and commander of the 281st Security Division
  - Oak Leaves on 5 May 1942 as Generalmajor and commander of the 281st Security Division
- Cholm Shield on 31 October 1942

Military offices
Preceded by Generalleutnant Friedrich Fürst	Commander of 34. Infanterie-Division; 5 September 1942 – 2 November 1942	Succeeded by General der Infanterie Friedrich Hochbaum
Preceded by Generalmajor Adolf Sinzinger	Commander of 83. Infanterie-Division; 2 November 1942 – 1 March 1944	Succeeded by Generalmajor Wilhelm Heun
