= Demyansk Shield =

WW2 German military decoration

Demyansk Shield Demjanskschild
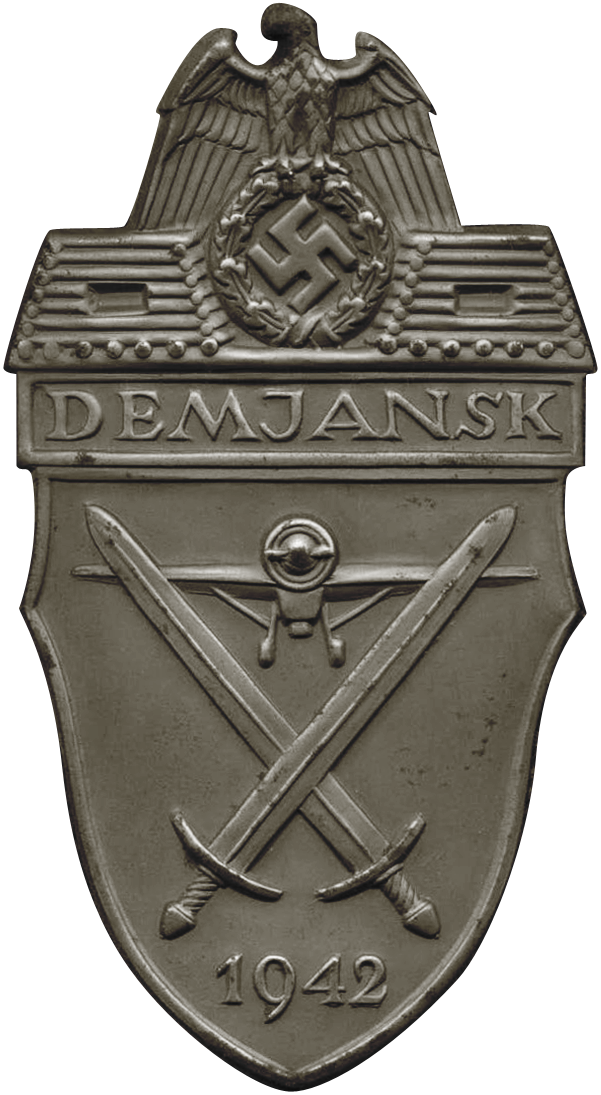
- Demyansk Shield
- Type: Badge
- Awarded for: Defence of the Demyansk Pocket
- Presented by: Nazi Germany
- Eligibility: Wehrmacht personnel
- Campaign: World War II
- Status: Obsolete
- Established: 25 April 1943
- Final award: 1 July 1944

Highlights
- Total: Approximately 100,000

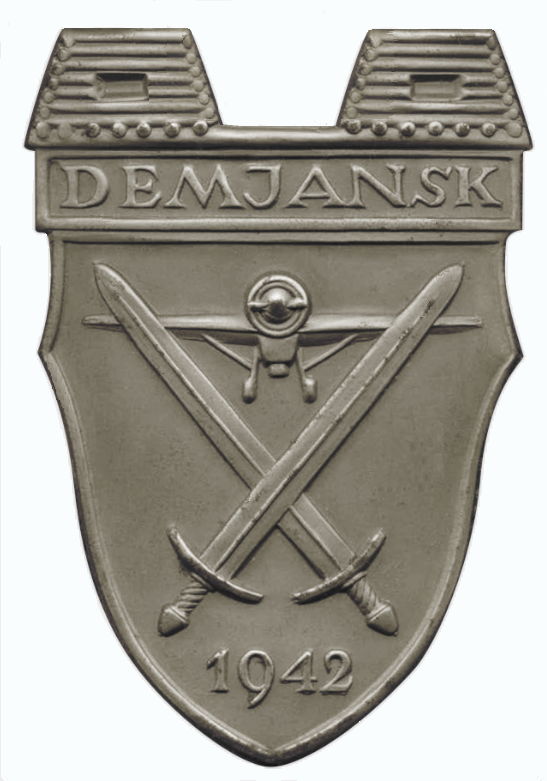
Post-war 'de-nazified' version

Demyansk Shield (German: Ärmelschild Demjansk) was a World War II German military decoration awarded to Wehrmacht personnel who fought in the Demyansk pocket on the Eastern Front in the early months of 1942. The pocket of German troops had been encircled and cut off by the Red Army around Demyansk (Demjansk), south of Leningrad, and was successfully defended with the aid of an airbridge. The shield was instituted on 25 April 1943 by Adolf Hitler and was not bestowed after 1 July 1944.

== Design ==
The shield was die-struck and produced in silver-washed zinc and later in plain zinc. It features at its apex an eagle with swooped down wings clutching a laurel wreath that surrounds a swastika. This is flanked by two log pillboxes with gun ports, with "DEMJANSK" in capitals below. The central portion of the shield features a head-on single engine aircraft behind two crossed swords and, at the base, the year "1942". Two minor variations of the aircraft's propeller exist with either a curved or straight propeller. The shield measures 51mm wide and 92mm in height.

It was affixed to the upper left sleeve of the uniform via a cloth that matched the colour of the uniform of the recipient:

- Light green-grey (field-grey) for Heer (army)
- Blue for Luftwaffe (air force)
- Black for Panzer (armoured) units
- Field-grey for Waffen-SS

Where the recipient received more than one campaign shield, the earlier was worn above any later awards.

After an initial ban, the Federal Republic of Germany re-authorised the wear of many World War II military decorations in 1957. These included the Demyansk Shield, re-designed by removing the eagle and swastika emblem at the top of the badge. Members of the Bundeswehr could wear the shield on the ribbon bar, represented by a small replica of the award on a field grey ribbon.

== Criteria for award ==
The qualifying period was 8 February to 21 April 1942. The requirement for ground units was honourable service in the besieged area for 60 days, or a shorter period if wounded. Luftwaffe personnel required 50 combat or re-supply missions over the besieged area.

Approximately 100,000 service personnel qualified for the shield, with up to five examples issued to each recipient, enabling them to be permanently attached to each tunic and greatcoat.

== See also ==
- Campaign shields (Wehrmacht)
- Cholm Shield
- Crimea Shield
- Kuban Shield
- Lapland Shield
- Narvik Shield
- Warsaw Shield
