= Kholm Pocket =

1942 battle of WW2 on Eastern Front

Coordinates: 57°09′N 31°11′E

- Part of the Eastern Front of World War II
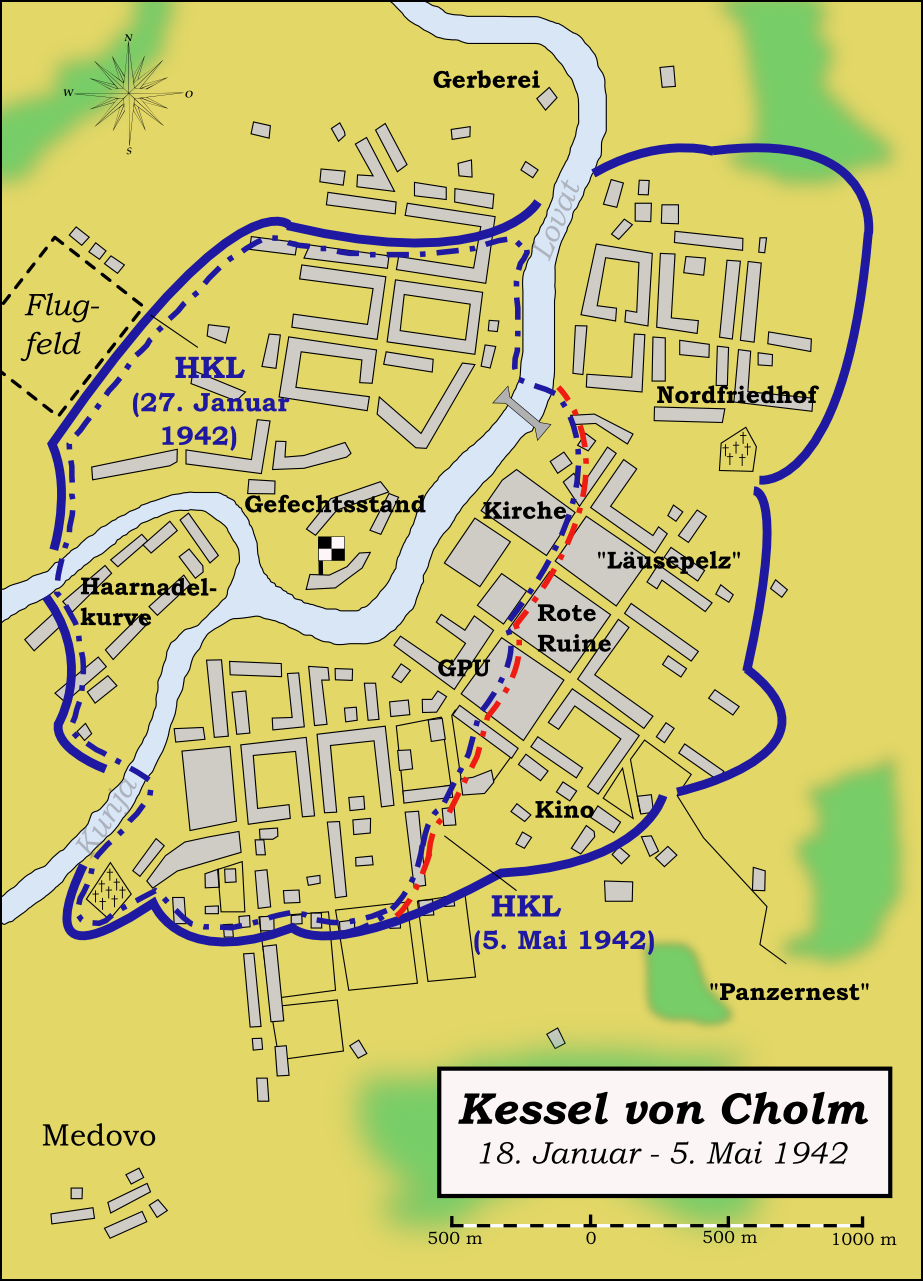
Date	23 January – 5 May 1942
Location	Kholm, Russia
Result	German defensive victory

Belligerents
Germany	Soviet Union

Commanders and leaders
Theodor Scherer	Nikolai Vatutin

Strength
5,500; 10 anti-tank guns 18 mortars	33rd rifle division 391st rifle division 20 tanks

Casualties and losses
1,500 killed 2,000 wounded	20,000 casualties

The Kholm Pocket (German: Kessel von Cholm; Russian: Холмский котёл) was the name given for the encirclement of German troops by the Red Army around Kholm, south of Leningrad, in World War II's the Eastern Front, from 23 January 1942 to 5 May 1942. The pocket was created by the Soviet Toropets–Kholm offensive.

A much larger pocket was meanwhile surrounded in Demyansk, about 100 km (62 mi) to the northeast. Both were the results of the German retreat following the defeat during the Battle of Moscow.

The air supply of Kholm and Demyansk was successful but led to an overconfidence in the German High Command on the Luftwaffe's ability to supply encircled forces by air, which would lead to disastrous consequences at the Battle of Stalingrad in late 1942 and early 1943.

== Overview ==
At the Kholm pocket, 5,500 German soldiers held out for 105 days. The pocket was supplied by air but since it was too small for planes to land, supplies had to be dropped in and recovered by the German defenders. Among the airdropped supplies were 35 of the first 50 prototype MKb 42(H) rifles.

Most of the German units in the pocket were part of the following:

- 218th Infantry Division
- Reserve-Polizei-Bataillon 65
- Infanterie-Regiment 553 (of the 329th Infantry Division)
- Parts of the 123rd Infantry Division
- Jagdkommando 8
- III. Bataillon of the Luftwaffenfeldregiment 1

German forces made attempts to relieve the pocket in January, March and May 1942. The first two failed, but the third was successful; the German forces in the pocket had been reduced to 1,200.

In July 1942, the Cholm Shield was awarded to the German defenders of the pocket upon the suggestion of Generalmajor Theodor Scherer, similar to the Demyansk Shield.

Scherer was personally awarded the Knight's Cross of the Iron Cross with Oak Leaves by Adolf Hitler for the command of the defence of Kholm.

Kholm would be occupied by the Red Army on 21 February 1944.

== War crimes ==
Members of the Reserve-Polizei-Bataillon 65, a police unit from Gelsenkirchen, were questioned after the war by the state prosecutor in Dortmund for their involvement in ethnic cleansing in Eastern Europe. The unit was found to have taken part in a minimum of 5,000 executions and many deportations to concentration camps. Among them was also the hanging of a young girl in Kholm during the siege.

== Gallery ==
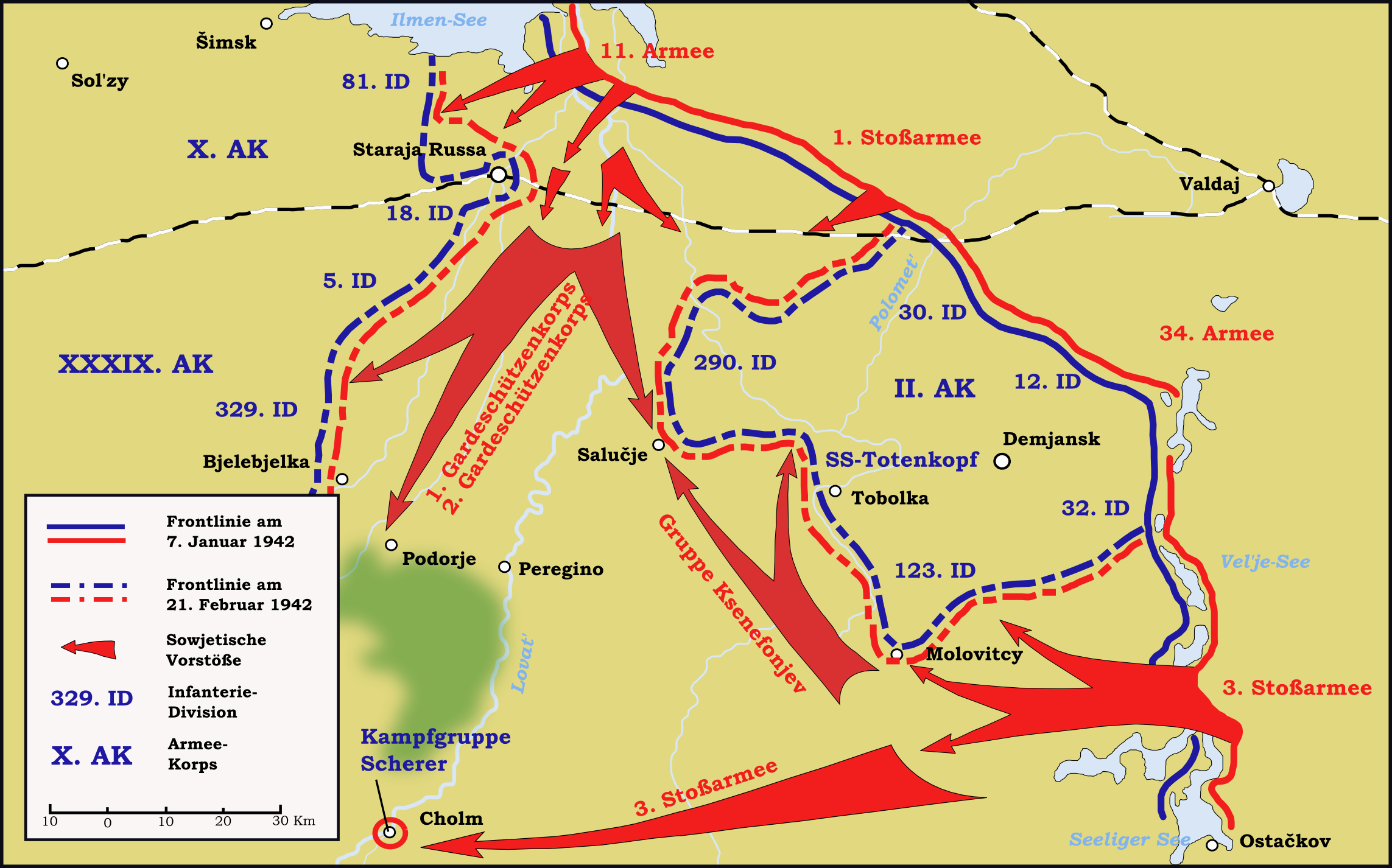
Offensive of the Red Army south of Lake Ilmen
7 January–21 February 1942

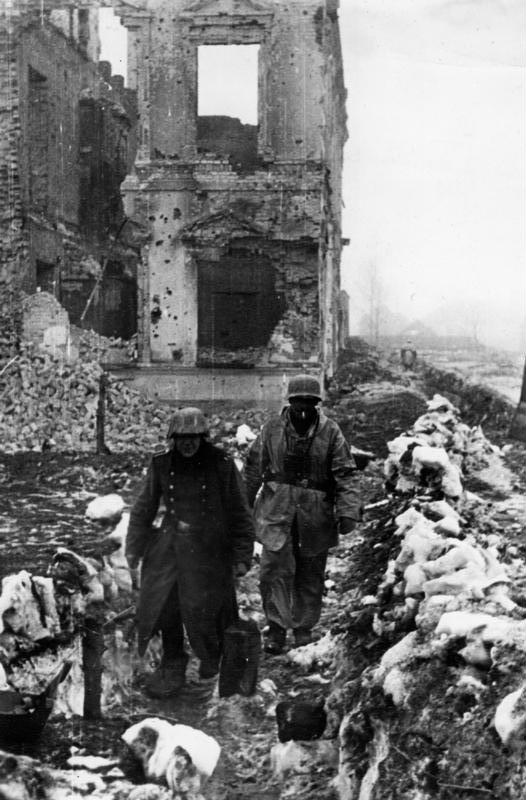
Soldiers in the Kholm Pocket, 1942

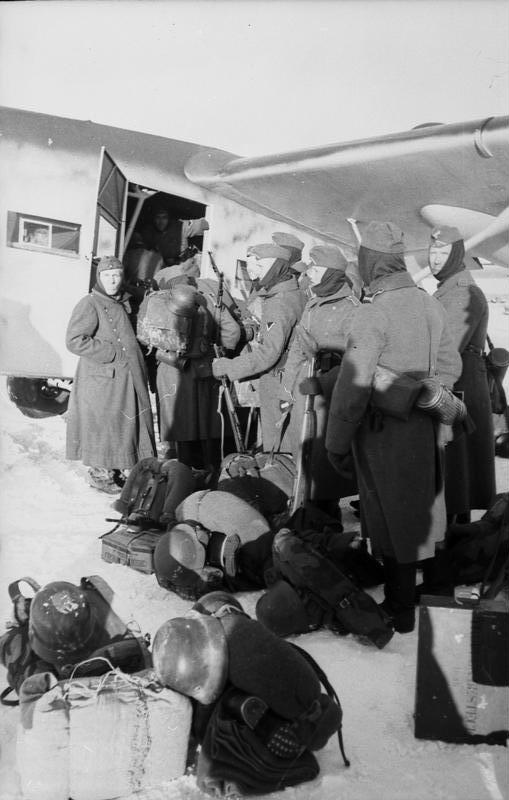
Soldiers preparing to board a Gotha Go 242 glider, Kholm

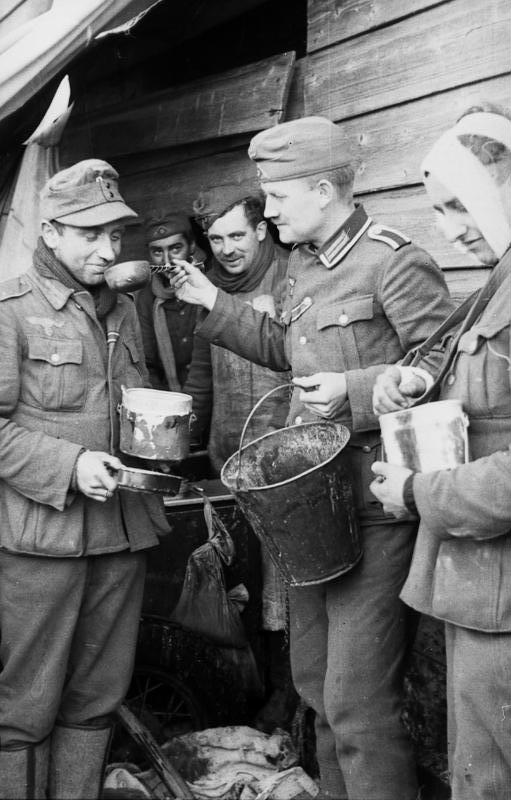
Sergeant gives soldier food, right: wounded with head and arm injuries, the end of January - beginning of May 1942

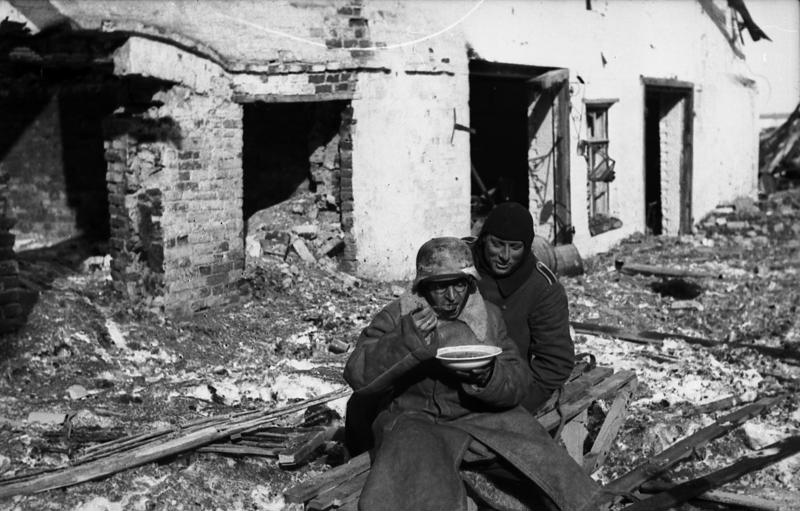
Soldier sitting for dinner in front of a ruined house

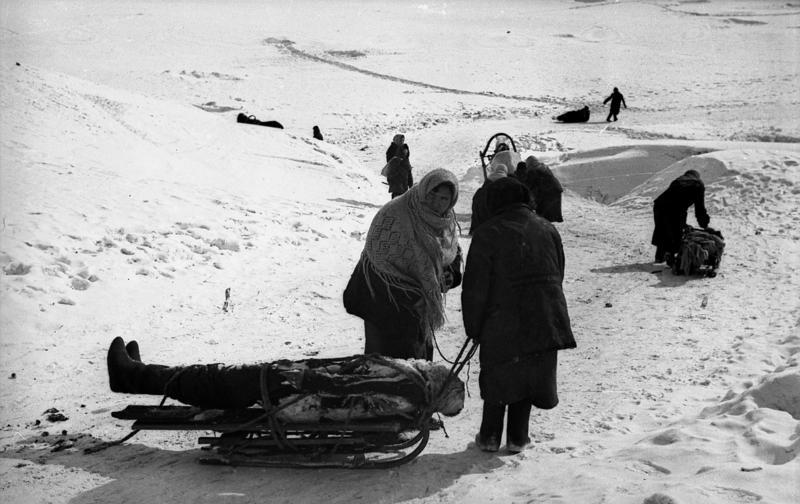
Russian women transport the dead by sledge during the occupation of Kholm. End January - Beginning May 1942.
